= List of active Finnish Navy ships =

Naval ensign of Finnish Navy

This is a list of ships currently being operated by the Finnish Navy or entering service in the near future, as of September 2018. In the case of a conflict, eight offshore patrol vessels, seven hovercraft and 81 coastal patrol boats from the Finnish Border Guard can be armed and transferred to the Navy.

== Active fleet ==
=== Navy combat fleet ===
| Class | In service | Picture | Type | Unit | Origin | Builder | Ship | No. | Comm. | Displacement | Notes |
Missile boats (8)
| Hamina class | 4 | | Missile boat | 7th Surface Warfare Squadron, Upinniemi | Finland | Aker Finnyards | Hamina | 80 | Aug 1998 | 250 t (250 long tons) | MLU 2018-2023. |
| Hamina class | 4 | | Missile boat | 7th Surface Warfare Squadron, Upinniemi | Finland | Aker Finnyards | Tornio | 81 | Feb 2001 | 250 t (250 long tons) | MLU 2018-2023. |
| Hamina class | 4 | | Missile boat | 7th Surface Warfare Squadron, Upinniemi | Finland | Aker Finnyards | Hanko | 82 | Dec 2003 | 250 t (250 long tons) | MLU 2018-2023. |
| Hamina class | 4 | | Missile boat | 7th Surface Warfare Squadron, Upinniemi | Finland | Aker Finnyards | Pori | 83 | Feb 2005 | 250 t (250 long tons) | MLU 2018-2023. |
| Rauma class | 4 | | Missile boat | 6th Surface Warfare Squadron, Pansio | Finland | Hollming Oy | Rauma | 70 | Oct 1990 | 240 t (240 long tons) | |
| Rauma class | 4 | | Missile boat | 6th Surface Warfare Squadron, Pansio | Finland | Hollming Oy | Raahe | 71 | Aug 1991 | 240 t (240 long tons) | |
| Rauma class | 4 | | Missile boat | 6th Surface Warfare Squadron, Pansio | Finland | Finnyards | Porvoo | 72 | Apr 1992 | 240 t (240 long tons) | |
| Rauma class | 4 | | Missile boat | 6th Surface Warfare Squadron, Pansio | Finland | Finnyards | Naantali | 73 | Jun 1992 | 240 t (240 long tons) | |
Minelayers (5)
| Hämeenmaa class | 2 | | Minelayer | 7th Surface Warfare Squadron, Upinniemi | Finland | Finnyards | Hämeenmaa | 02 | Apr 1992 | 1,450 t (1,430 long tons) | MLU in 2006-2008. |
| Hämeenmaa class | 2 | | Minelayer | 6th Surface Warfare Squadron, Pansio | Finland | Finnyards | Uusimaa | 05 | Dec 1992 | 1,450 t (1,430 long tons) | MLU in 2006-2008. |
| Pansio class | 3 | | Minelayer | 6th Surface Warfare Squadron, Pansio | Finland | Visser shipyard Den Helder | Pansio | 90 | Sep 1991 | 680 t (670 long tons) | |
| Pansio class | 3 | | Minelayer | 7th Surface Warfare Squadron, Upinniemi | Finland | Visser shipyard Den Helder | Pyhäranta | 92 | May 1992 | 680 t (670 long tons) | |
| Pansio class | 3 | | Minelayer | 7th Surface Warfare Squadron, Upinniemi | Finland | Visser shipyard Den Helder | Porkkala | 91 | Oct 1992 | 680 t (670 long tons) | |
Minesweepers (13)
| Katanpää class | 3 | | Mine countermeasure vessel | 4th Mine Countermeasures Squadron, Pansio | Italy | Intermarine S.p.A | Katanpää | 40 | 2012 | 680 t (670 long tons) | |
| Katanpää class | 3 | | Mine countermeasure vessel | 4th Mine Countermeasures Squadron, Pansio | Italy | Intermarine S.p.A | Purunpää | 41 | 2013 | 680 t (670 long tons) | |
| Katanpää class | 3 | | Mine countermeasure vessel | 4th Mine Countermeasures Squadron, Pansio | Italy | Intermarine S.p.A | Vahterpää | 42 | 2016 | 680 t (670 long tons) | |
| Kuha class | 4 | | Minesweeper | 4th Mine Countermeasures Squadron, Pansio | Finland | Laivateollisuus | Kuha 21 | 21 | Jun 1974 | 150 t (150 long tons) | MLU in 1998-1999. Decommissioned: Kuha 22 and Kuha 25. |
| Kuha class | 4 | | Minesweeper | 4th Mine Countermeasures Squadron, Pansio | Finland | Laivateollisuus | Kuha 23 | 23 | Mar 1975 | 150 t (150 long tons) | MLU in 1998-1999. Decommissioned: Kuha 22 and Kuha 25. |
| Kuha class | 4 | | Minesweeper | 4th Mine Countermeasures Squadron, Pansio | Finland | Laivateollisuus | Kuha 24 | 24 | Mar 1975 | 150 t (150 long tons) | MLU in 1998-1999. Decommissioned: Kuha 22 and Kuha 25. |
| Kuha class | 4 | | Minesweeper | 4th Mine Countermeasures Squadron, Pansio | Finland | Laivateollisuus | Kuha 26 | 26 | Nov 1975 | 150 t (150 long tons) | MLU in 1998-1999. Decommissioned: Kuha 22 and Kuha 25. |
| Kiiski class | 6 | | Minesweeper | 4th Mine Countermeasures Squadron, Pansio | Finland | Fiskars Oy | Kiiski 1 | 521 | 1981 | 20 t (20 long tons) | MLU in 1998-1999. Decommissioned: Kiiski 2 (522) |
| Kiiski class | 6 | | Minesweeper | 4th Mine Countermeasures Squadron, Pansio | Finland | Fiskars Oy | Kiiski 3 | 523 | Nov 1983 | 20 t (20 long tons) | MLU in 1998-1999. Decommissioned: Kiiski 2 (522) |
| Kiiski class | 6 | | Minesweeper | 4th Mine Countermeasures Squadron, Pansio | Finland | Fiskars Oy | Kiiski 4 | 524 | Dec 1983 | 20 t (20 long tons) | MLU in 1998-1999. Decommissioned: Kiiski 2 (522) |
| Kiiski class | 6 | | Minesweeper | 4th Mine Countermeasures Squadron, Pansio | Finland | Fiskars Oy | Kiiski 5 | 525 | May 1985 | 20 t (20 long tons) | MLU in 1998-1999. Decommissioned: Kiiski 2 (522) |
| Kiiski class | 6 | | Minesweeper | 4th Mine Countermeasures Squadron, Pansio | Finland | Fiskars Oy | Kiiski 6 | 526 | May 1985 | 20 t (20 long tons) | MLU in 1998-1999. Decommissioned: Kiiski 2 (522) |
| Kiiski class | 6 | | Minesweeper | 4th Mine Countermeasures Squadron, Pansio | Finland | Fiskars Oy | Kiiski 7 | 527 | May 1985 | 20 t (20 long tons) | MLU in 1998-1999. Decommissioned: Kiiski 2 (522) |

=== Landing crafts ===
| Class | In service | Picture | Type | Unit | Origin | Builder | No. | Comm. | Displacement | Notes |
Landing crafts (110)
| Jehu class (U-700 / Watercat M18 AMC) | 12 | | Landing craft | Coast Guard Units and the Uusimaa Brigade | Finland | Marine Alutech Oy | U701 - U712 | 2014 - 2016 | 32 t (31 long tons) | Transports up to 25 soldiers or 5.7 t (13,000 lb) of cargo. |
| Jurmo class (U-600 / Watercat M12) | 38 | | Landing craft | Coast Guard Units and the Uusimaa Brigade | Finland | Marine Alutech Oy | U601 - U638 | 2000 - 2004 | 14 t (14 long tons) | 38 were in service as of 2023, and 17 additional crafts were ordered in 2023. Transports up to 20 soldiers or 3 t (6,600 lb) of cargo. |
| Jurmo class (U-600 / Watercat M12) | 17 | | Landing craft | Coast Guard Units and the Uusimaa Brigade | Finland | Marine Alutech Oy | U639 - U655 | 2023 - 2025 | 14 t (14 long tons) | 38 were in service as of 2023, and 17 additional crafts were ordered in 2023. Transports up to 20 soldiers or 3 t (6,600 lb) of cargo. |
| Uisko class (U-200, U-300, U-400 / Watercat M11) | > 24 | | Landing craft | – | Finland | Alumina Varvet Oy | U210 - U211 | 1983 - 1991 | 10 t (9.8 long tons) | It is being decommissioned with at least 11 of the 35 watercraft purchased. Transports up to 2.5 t (5,500 lb) of cargo. |
| Uisko class (U-200, U-300, U-400 / Watercat M11) | > 24 | | Landing craft | – | Finland | Alumina Varvet Oy | U301 - U317 | 1983 - 1991 | 10 t (9.8 long tons) | It is being decommissioned with at least 11 of the 35 watercraft purchased. Transports up to 2.5 t (5,500 lb) of cargo. |
| Uisko class (U-200, U-300, U-400 / Watercat M11) | > 24 | | Landing craft | – | Finland | Alumina Varvet Oy | U400 - | 1983 - 1991 | 10 t (9.8 long tons) | It is being decommissioned with at least 11 of the 35 watercraft purchased. Transports up to 2.5 t (5,500 lb) of cargo. |
| G class (G-100 / Watercat M8) | 37 | | Landing craft | Used by the Coast Guard Units. | Finland | Marine Alutech Oy | G98 - G99 | 2001 - 2006 | 2.1 t (2.1 long tons) | Transports up to 8 soldiers or 1 t (2,200 lb) of cargo. |
| G class (G-100 / Watercat M8) | 37 | | Landing craft | Used by the Coast Guard Units. | Finland | Marine Alutech Oy | G101 - G135 | 2001 - 2006 | 2.1 t (2.1 long tons) | Transports up to 8 soldiers or 1 t (2,200 lb) of cargo. |
| L class | 6 | | Landing craft | 4th Mine Countermeasures Squadron, Pansio | Finland | Finnspeed Boats Oy | L108 - L113 | 1991 - 1992 | 14 t (14 long tons) | Of the 12 built, 6 were transferred over to National Defence Training Association (MPK). |

=== Auxiliary ships ===
| Class | In service | Picture | Type | Unit | Origin | Builder | Ship | No. | Comm. | Displacement | Notes |
Multirole vessels (3)
| Louhi class | 1 | | Multirole vessel (Pollution control, environmental accident fighting, cable laying and diver support vessel) | 8th Maintenance Squadron, Turku, Kirkkonummi | Finland | Aker Finnyards | Louhi | 999 | 2011 | 3,450 t (3,400 long tons) | |
| Halli class | 1 | | Multirole vessel (Pollution control, environmental accident fighting, cable laying and diver support vessel) | 8th Maintenance Squadron, Turku, Kirkkonummi | Finland | Hollming Oy | Halli | 899 | 1986 | 2,100 t (2,100 long tons) | MLU in 2010. |
| Hylje class | 1 | | Multirole vessel (Pollution control, environmental accident fighting, cable laying and diver support vessel) | 8th Maintenance Squadron, Turku, Kirkkonummi | Finland | Laivateollisuus | Hylje | 799 | 1981 | 1,400 t (1,400 long tons) | MLU in 1990-1991. |
| Uisko class | 1 | | Multirole vessel (Pollution control, environmental accident fighting, cable laying and diver support vessel) | 8th Maintenance Squadron, Turku, Kirkkonummi | Finland | Uusikaupunki shipyard (Rauma-Repola) | Tursas | 699 | 1987 | 1,250 t (1,230 long tons) | Lead ship Tursas was transferred to the Finnish Navy on 2 March 2026. |
Transport vessels (13)
| Hila class | 4 | | Transport vessel | Coastal Fleet | Finland | – | Hila | 237 | 1991 - 1994 | 50 t (49 long tons) | Icebreaker capability in their transport role. |
| Hila class | 4 | | Transport vessel | Coastal Fleet | Finland | – | Haruna | 238 | 1991 - 1994 | 50 t (49 long tons) | Icebreaker capability in their transport role. |
| Hila class | 4 | | Transport vessel | Coastal Fleet | Finland | – | Hästö | 739 | 1991 - 1994 | 50 t (49 long tons) | Icebreaker capability in their transport role. |
| Hila class | 4 | | Transport vessel | Coastal Fleet | Finland | – | Högsåra | 830 | 1991 - 1994 | 50 t (49 long tons) | Icebreaker capability in their transport role. |
| Utö class | 9 | | Transport vessel | Coastal Fleet | Norway; Finland (licence) | Kewatec AluBoat | – | U501 | 2023 - 2024 | – | Vessel with a 15 t (33,000 lb) transport capacity and equipped with a Fassi F120-crane (11.1 t (24,000 lb) capacity). |
| Utö class | 9 | | Transport vessel | Coastal Fleet | Norway; Finland (licence) | Kewatec AluBoat | – | U502 | 2023 - 2024 | – | Vessel with a 15 t (33,000 lb) transport capacity and equipped with a Fassi F120-crane (11.1 t (24,000 lb) capacity). |
| Utö class | 9 | | Transport vessel | Coastal Fleet | Norway; Finland (licence) | Kewatec AluBoat | – | U503 | 2023 - 2024 | – | Vessel with a 15 t (33,000 lb) transport capacity and equipped with a Fassi F120-crane (11.1 t (24,000 lb) capacity). |
| Utö class | 9 | | Transport vessel | Coastal Fleet | Norway; Finland (licence) | Kewatec AluBoat | – | U504 | 2023 - 2024 | – | Vessel with a 15 t (33,000 lb) transport capacity and equipped with a Fassi F120-crane (11.1 t (24,000 lb) capacity). |
| Utö class | 9 | | Transport vessel | Coastal Fleet | Norway; Finland (licence) | Kewatec AluBoat | – | U505 | 2023 - 2024 | – | Vessel with a 15 t (33,000 lb) transport capacity and equipped with a Fassi F120-crane (11.1 t (24,000 lb) capacity). |
| Utö class | 9 | | Transport vessel | Coastal Fleet | Norway; Finland (licence) | Kewatec AluBoat | – | U506 | 2023 - 2024 | – | Vessel with a 15 t (33,000 lb) transport capacity and equipped with a Fassi F120-crane (11.1 t (24,000 lb) capacity). |
| Utö class | 9 | | Transport vessel | Coastal Fleet | Norway; Finland (licence) | Kewatec AluBoat | – | U507 | 2023 - 2024 | – | Vessel with a 15 t (33,000 lb) transport capacity and equipped with a Fassi F120-crane (11.1 t (24,000 lb) capacity). |
| Utö class | 9 | | Transport vessel | Coastal Fleet | Norway; Finland (licence) | Kewatec AluBoat | – | U508 | 2023 - 2024 | – | Vessel with a 15 t (33,000 lb) transport capacity and equipped with a Fassi F120-crane (11.1 t (24,000 lb) capacity). |
| Utö class | 9 | | Transport vessel | Coastal Fleet | Norway; Finland (licence) | Kewatec AluBoat | – | U509 | 2023 - 2024 | – | Vessel with a 15 t (33,000 lb) transport capacity and equipped with a Fassi F120-crane (11.1 t (24,000 lb) capacity). |
Command vessels (4)
| Syöksy class | 4 | | Battle group command support vessel | Coastal Fleet | Finland | – | Jymy | 511 | 1991 - 1993 | 19 t (19 long tons) | |
| Syöksy class | 4 | | Battle group command support vessel | Coastal Fleet | Finland | – | Raju | 512 | 1991 - 1993 | 19 t (19 long tons) | |
| Syöksy class | 4 | | Battle group command support vessel | Coastal Fleet | Finland | – | Syöksy | 531 | 1991 - 1993 | 19 t (19 long tons) | |
| Syöksy class | 4 | | Battle group command support vessel | Coastal Fleet | Finland | – | Vinha | 541 | 1991 - 1993 | 19 t (19 long tons) | |
Research vessel (1)
| Isku class | 1 | – | Research vessel | Coastal Fleet | Finland | Reposaaren Konepaja | Isku | 826 | 1990 (after modifications) | 130 t (130 long tons) | Former experimental missile vessel, repurposed for research and test vessels. |
Cable layers (2)
| K410 class | 2 | | Cable layers | – | Finland | Uudenkaupungin Työvene | K410 | – | 2009 | 35 t (34 long tons) | Used to lay cables for command and communications system, and also used in maintenance work. |
| K410 class | 2 | | Cable layers | – | Finland | Uudenkaupungin Työvene | K411 | – | 2010 | 35 t (34 long tons) | Used to lay cables for command and communications system, and also used in maintenance work. |
Tugboats (2)
| Haukipää class | 2 | – | Tugboats | – | Finland | Waterman Oy | Haukipää | 731 | 1985 | 50 t (49 long tons) | |
| Haukipää class | 2 | – | Tugboats | – | Finland | Waterman Oy | Kallanpää | 831 | 1986 | 50 t (49 long tons) | |
Training vessels (4)
| Fabian Wrede class | 3 | | Training ship | Finnish Naval Academy | Finland | Uudenkaupungin Työvene | Fabian Wrede | 690 | 2006 | 65 t (64 long tons) | |
| Fabian Wrede class | 3 | | Training ship | Finnish Naval Academy | Finland | Uudenkaupungin Työvene | Wilhelm Carpelan | 691 | 2006 | 65 t (64 long tons) | |
| Fabian Wrede class | 3 | | Training ship | Finnish Naval Academy | Finland | Uudenkaupungin Työvene | Lokki-class | 56 | 2006 | 65 t (64 long tons) | |
| Lokki class | 1 | | Training ship | Finnish Naval Academy | Finland | Oy Laivateollisuus Ab | Kajava | 56 | 1985 | 65 t (64 long tons) | |

== Future ships ==
| Class | On order | Picture | Type | Unit | Origin | Builder | Ship | No. | Status | Displacement | Notes |
Corvettes (4)
| Pohjanmaa class | 4 | – | Corvette | – | Finland; Sweden (electronic) | Rauma Marine Construction | Pohjanmaa | – | Launched | 4,300 t (4,200 long tons) | |
| Pohjanmaa class | 4 | – | Corvette | – | Finland; Sweden (electronic) | Rauma Marine Construction | – | – | Under construction | 4,300 t (4,200 long tons) | |
| Pohjanmaa class | 4 | – | Corvette | – | Finland; Sweden (electronic) | Rauma Marine Construction | – | – | Under construction | 4,300 t (4,200 long tons) | |
| Pohjanmaa class | 4 | – | Corvette | – | Finland; Sweden (electronic) | Rauma Marine Construction | – | – | - | 4,300 t (4,200 long tons) | |
| Lokki replacement class | 1 (3 options) | – | Training vessel | – | Finland | | Lokki (?) | – | – | 65 t (64 long tons) | |
| Lokki replacement class | 1 (3 options) | – | Training vessel | – | Finland | | – | – | – | 65 t (64 long tons) | |
| Lokki replacement class | 1 (3 options) | – | Training vessel | – | Finland | | – | – | – | 65 t (64 long tons) | |
| Lokki replacement class | 1 (3 options) | – | Training vessel | – | Finland | | – | – | – | 65 t (64 long tons) | |

== See also ==
- List of decommissioned ships of the Finnish Navy
- Finnish Navy
