= Finnish pollution control vessel Louhi =

Finnish pollution control vessel

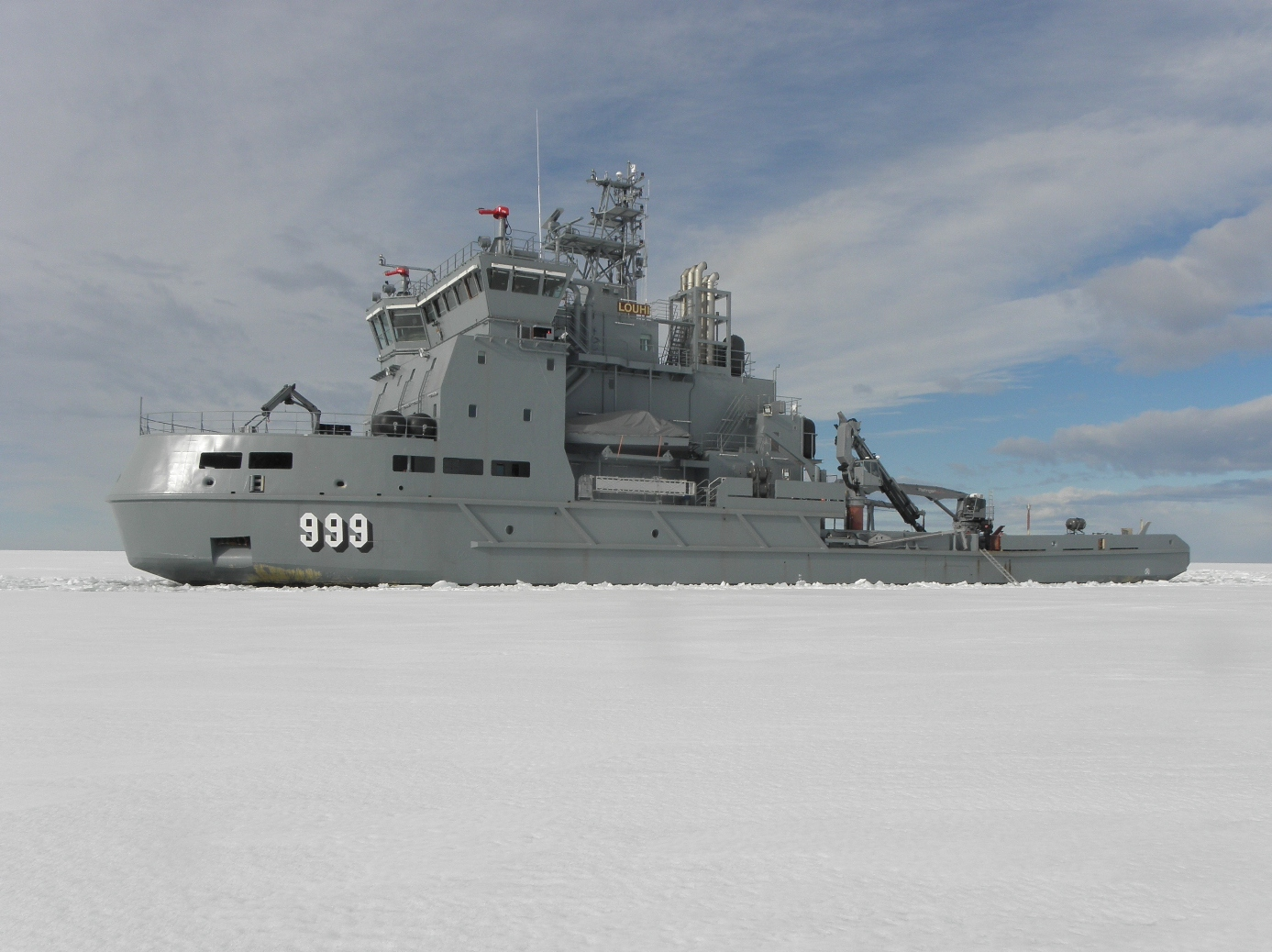

History

Finland
- Name: Louhi
- Namesake: Louhi
- Owner: Finnish Environment Institute
- Operator: Finnish Navy
- Ordered: 26 October 2007
- Builder: Uki Workboat Ltd
- Cost: €48 million
- Yard number: NB27184
- Launched: 15 April 2009
- Christened: 8 March 2011
- Commissioned: May 2011
- Home port: Upinniemi, Finland
- Identification: Call sign: OJBP; MMSI number: 230616000; IMO number: 9500845
- Status: In service

General characteristics
- Type: Oil spill response vessel
- Displacement: 2,200 tons (lightship); 3,450 tons (max)
- Length: 71.4 m (234.3 ft)
- Beam: 14.5 m (47.6 ft)
- Height: 24.0 m (78.7 ft)
- Draught: 5.0 m (16.4 ft)
- Ice class: 1A Super
- Installed power: 4 × Wärtsilä 9L20 (4 × 1,800 kW)
- Propulsion: Diesel-electric; Two Rolls-Royce azimuth thrusters (2 × 2,700 kW); Bow thruster (500 kW)
- Speed: 15 knots (28 km/h; 17 mph) in open water
- Range: 6,000 nautical miles (11,000 km; 6,900 mi)
- Endurance: 20 days
- Capacity: 1,200 m^{3} for recovered oil; 200 m^{3} for chemicals
- Crew: 10–15; accommodation for 40 personnel
- Armament: Can be armed during crisis

Louhi (pennant number 999) is a Finnish multipurpose oil and chemical spill response vessel owned by the Finnish Environment Institute (SYKE), but crewed and operated by the Finnish Navy. The ship, ordered in 2007, was built by Uki Workboat in Uusikaupunki, Finland, and entered service in May 2011.

== History ==
=== Development and construction ===
The development of the new multipurpose vessel began on 25 May 2003 when the Ministry of Transport and Communications appointed a work group to investigate the technical requirements and economic aspects of building a new multipurpose icebreaker capable of combating oil and chemical spills around the year. The amount of oil transported in the Gulf of Finland had increased from a mere 15 million tons per year in the early 1990s to 69 million tons in 2003 and was expected to reach 130 million tons by 2010 after the new Russian oil terminals became operational, increasing the risk of a large spill in the vulnerable sea area considerably. While Finland already had a fleet of vessels with oil recovery equipment, none of them were capable of collecting spilled oil efficiently in heavy seas or in ice. The new multipurpose icebreaker would be designed to be capable of recovering spilled oil and chemicals in both open water and ice conditions, extinguishing shipboard fires and emergency towing of the largest merchant ships operating in the Gulf of Finland. The new vessel would also have sufficient icebreaking capability to assist oil tankers to the Kilpilahti oil refinery in Porvoo during winter. However, in the interim report, published on 30 September 2003, the work group noted that unless other work outside the winter months could be arranged and the new multipurpose icebreaker would have to spend the rest of the year in pollution control readiness, the operating expenses would be very high.

The work group published its final report on 31 December 2003 and came to a conclusion that while the proposed vessel would definitely be needed and it would be technically possible to construct one, fulfilling the requirements of the different operators with a single ship would be difficult and, as noted before, remaining on standby during the open water season would be very expensive. The work group estimated that the purchase price of the vessel would be 30–70 million euro. One of the proposed alternatives was the conversion of the Finnish multipurpose icebreaker Fennica, built in 1993, to a spill response vessel, but this was not pursued further.

The decision of ordering the new multipurpose icebreaker was made in late 2004 and the Finnish Environment Institute and the Finnish Maritime Administration were authorized by the Government to make an agreement on the vessel and launch a request for tenders in early 2005. The new oil spill response vessel was expected to enter service in 2007. However, only a few offers were received and the new vessel, for which 134 million euro was reserved in the budget, turned out to be more expensive than expected. After evaluating more economic alternatives in October 2005 the committee working on the project came to a conclusion that a new multipurpose oil recovery vessel would still be the best solution to improve spill response readiness. 35 million euro were allocated for the purchasing of the new vessel.

The Finnish Environment Institute sent offers to several shipyards, both domestic and foreign, during the spring 2007. Construction of the new vessel was awarded to the Finnish shipyard UKI Workboat Ltd (Uudenkaupungin Työvene Oy) and the contract, worth 48 million euro, was signed on 26 October 2007. As the new vessel was more expensive than initially planned, an additional 13 million euro was allocated for the purchase in the supplementary budget. The vessel, expected to enter service in 2010–2011, would be operated by the Finnish Navy and based in Upinniemi, where it would replace the aging spill response vessel Hylje. The ship underwent sea trials in early 2011 and was commissioned in May.

=== Naming ===
On 8 March 2011, the new multipurpose spill response vessel became the third ship of the Finnish Navy to be named after Louhi, the queen of Pohjola in the Finnish mythology. Its pennant number is 999.

The first Louhi was a minelayer, built in 1917 as Voin, that was left behind by withdrawing Russian Navy. The newly founded Finnish Navy acquired the ship and renamed it first M-1 (Miinalaiva 1, Finnish for Minelayer 1) in 1918 and finally Louhi in 1936. On 12 January 1945, when the ship was laying mines with minelayer Ruotsinsalmi at the Gulf of Finland, it was hit either by a mine or a torpedo from a German U-boat. The first Louhi sank in two minutes with a loss of 11 lives.

The second Louhi was built in 1939 as icebreaker Sisu and handed over to the Navy in 1970, renamed and given pennant number 90. The ship served as a support ship for Tuima class missile boats and Turunmaa class gunboats, towing them during transit journeys. The second Louhi was decommissioned and scrapped in 1986 mainly because it had become nearly impossible to get spare parts for the old engines.

=== Operational career ===
On 24 December 2011 Louhi and Linja, another Finnish spill response vessel, were dispatched to the Gulf of Bothnia as a precaution after a tall oil spill from Arizona Chemical plant near Söderhamn in Sweden. While Sweden had not send an official request for assistance yet, the Finnish recovery ships prepared to join the spill combating operation if the oil slick, at that time some 50 kilometres (31 miles) northeast from Söderhamn, started drifting towards the Finnish coast. Although Louhi can operate in relatively high seas, the recovery effort was hindered and subsequently the oil slick was broken up by the storm on 27 December 2011. When Louhi moved to the recovery area on 28 December, the slick could not be located and only 20–30 litres (4.4–6.6 imp gal; 5.3–7.9 US gal) of weathered oil was recovered.

== Mission ==
Due to the sensitive ecology of the Baltic Sea, it has been agreed in the Helsinki Convention (HELCOM) that instead of using dispersants to dissolve the oil slicks, combatting the spills is based on mechanical recovery using oil booms to limit the spill and skimmers to collect the oil from the surface as quickly and completely as possible. For this purpose every Finnish pollution control vessel is equipped with permanently installed built-in recovery equipment and such systems have also been installed on several patrol vessels of the Finnish Border Guard. As the primary mission of the new vessel is pollution prevention, the ship has an extensive array of equipment capable of detecting and recovering spilled oil and chemicals in open water, high seas and ice conditions. Some of the equipment, such as an oil-detecting radar and a thermographic camera in the mast, are used for the first time in a Finnish oil recovery vessel. In addition the ship has a weather station and a wet laboratory capable of analyzing water samples automatically.

In addition to environmental duties, Louhi can also be used as a support ship for underwater operations by the Finnish Navy. The vessel has facilities for divers, a moon pool and remotely operated underwater vehicles (ROVs), and it can be used to lay and recover submarine communications cable which is stored in the ship's recovery tanks. During crisis time the ship, capable of carrying 1,000 tons of fuel and 100 tons of cargo, can be armed with one 40 mm main gun, two 12.7 mm machine guns and naval mines, and used to supply island forts and other naval vessels.

== Design ==
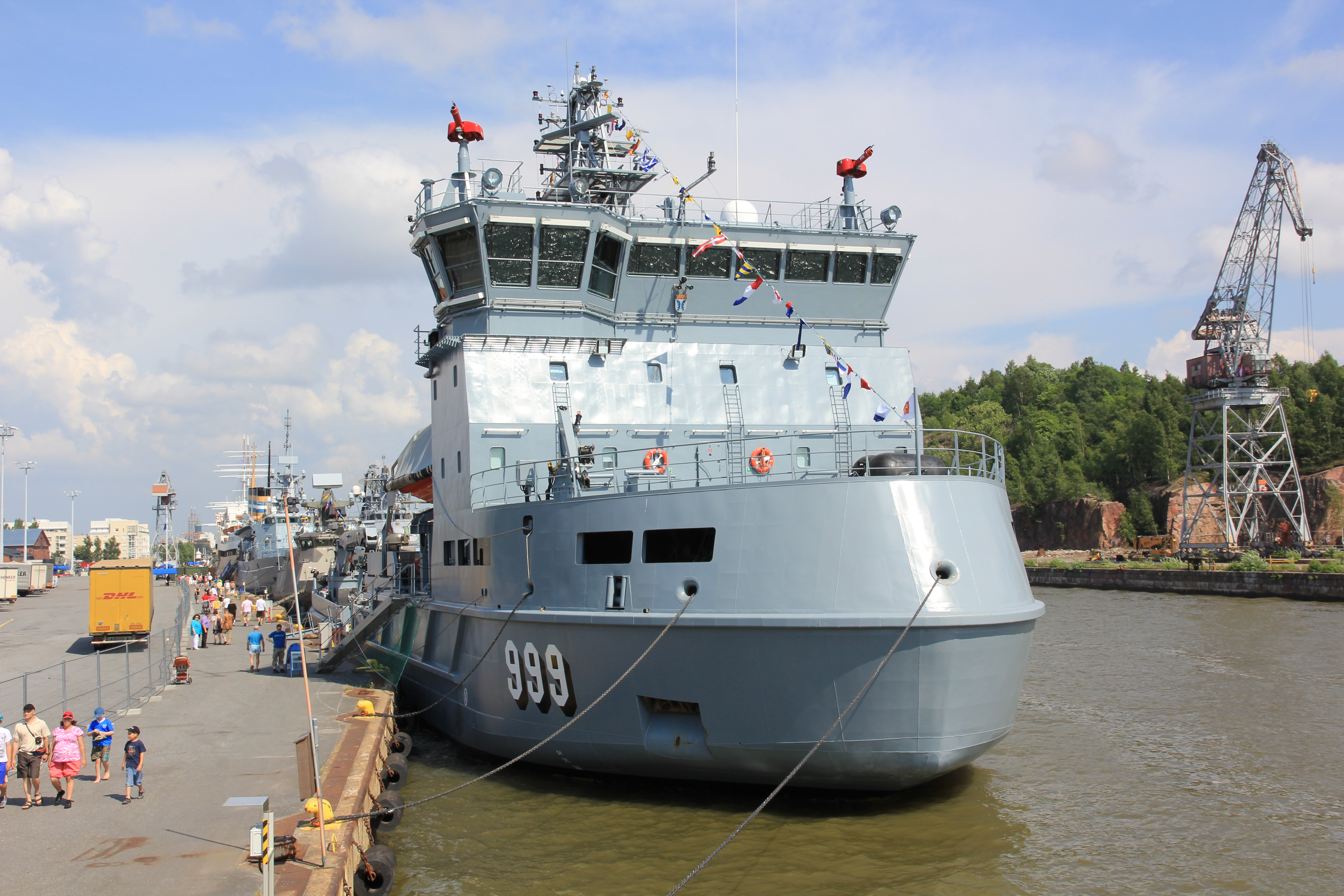
Louhi in Turku

=== General characteristics ===
Louhi is 71.4 metres (234.3 ft) long, 14.5 metres (47.6 ft) wide and has a draught of 5.0 metres (16.4 ft). At 3,450 tons, it is the largest ship by displacement currently in service in the Finnish Navy and the third largest ever, second only to the coastal defence ships Väinämöinen and Ilmarinen.

The ship is built according to Germanischer Lloyd rules for classification with class notation of GL 100 A5, E4, NAV-OC, Tug, Supply Vessel, Marine Pollution Response Vessel, Oil Recovery Vessel, Chemical Recovery Vessel for the ship and GL MC, E4, AUT, FF1 for the machinery. The vessel is built to the highest Finnish-Swedish ice class, 1A Super, with special consideration for the dimensioning of the propulsion and hull to meet the requirements for icebreaking capability as the Finnish-Swedish ice class rules do not extend to icebreaking vessels.

=== Power and propulsion ===
Electricity is produced by four 9-cylinder Wärtsilä 9L20 4-stroke medium-speed diesel generating sets with a combined output of 7,200 kW (9,655 hp). The generators provide power for all shipboard consumers, including two 2,700 kW Z-drive thrusters with 3.1-metre (10.2 ft) four-bladed propellers and a 500 kW bow thruster. The diesel-electric azimuth thrusters, manufactured by Rolls-Royce, give the vessel excellent maneuverability at low speeds, stationkeeping and dynamic positioning capability, and a towing capacity of 600 kN (61 t_{f}).

Louhi has icebreaking capabilities second only to real icebreakers. The ship is designed to maintain a continuous speed of 7.5 knots (13.9 km/h; 8.6 mph) in 50-centimetre (20 in) ice and 3 knots (5.6 km/h; 3.5 mph) in 1-metre (3 ft) ice, both with a 20 centimetres (8 in) snow cover. Additionally the vessel is designed to be capable of penetrating an ice ridge with a maximum thickness of 5 metres (16 ft) with a single ram starting from 7.5 knots (13.9 km/h; 8.6 mph), maintain a speed of 9.5 knots (17.6 km/h; 10.9 mph) in 1-metre (3.3 ft) thick brash ice channel and be capable of operating in brash ice channels up to 2.3 metres (8 ft) thick. In open water the ship has a service speed of 15 kn (28 km/h).

The operational range of the vessel is 6,000 nautical miles (11,000 km; 6,900 mi) and the provisions give the ship an endurance of 20 days.

=== Recovery equipment ===
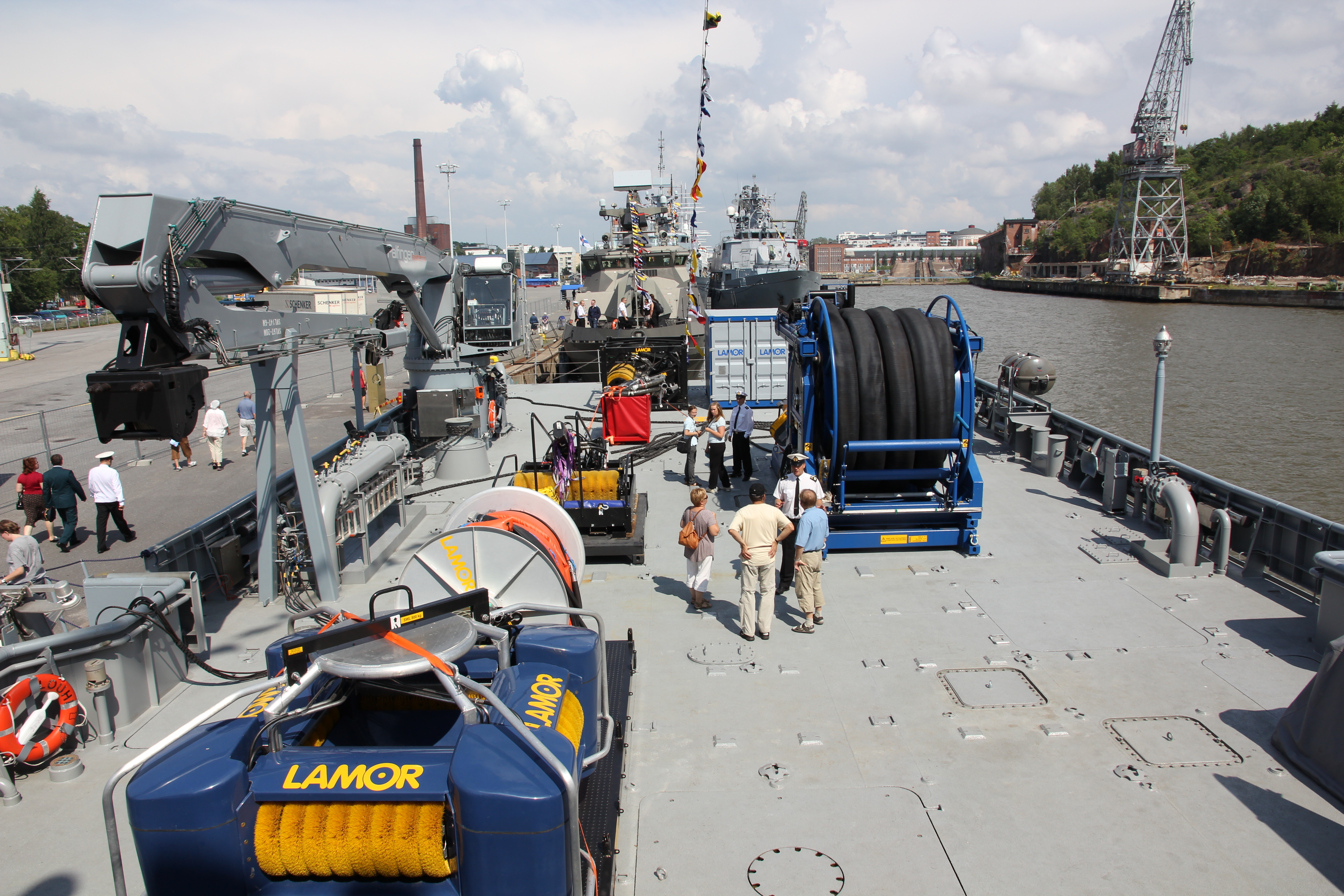
Oil recovery equipment on the aft deck of Louhi

The mechanical oil recovery equipment on board Louhi is based on the same stiff brush technology that has been proved to be effective by the previous Finnish spill response vessels. The vessel is equipped with three different types of recovery systems developed and manufactured by Lamor, each suitable for specific weather conditions. The equipment is fully mechanized, remotely controlled and capable of deploying to operational mode in 10 minutes per side. The fourth system, designed for difficult ice conditions, is an innovation developed by the Finnish Environment Institute.

In open water, the ship uses a permanently installed advancing system which consists of outriggers and sweeping booms on both sides of the ship that recover oil and debris from a wide area as the vessel moves forwards with a constant speed of 1.5 knots (2.8 km/h; 1.7 mph). The polluted material is collected in side boxes inside the ship where they are separated from the water for processing by brush conveyors. The sweeping width of the advancing system is 42 metres (138 ft), second only to the Finnish icebreaker Kontio that has been equipped for oil recovery by the European Maritime Safety Agency and has a sweeping width of approximately 50 metres (164 ft).

However, as the advancing system can only be used effectively in calm seas with significant wave height below one metre, Louhi is also equipped with a special "wave damping tank", an innovation used for the first time in a Finnish recovery vessel, that can be used in combination with the aforementioned stiff brush conveyors and a shorter sweeping boom to collect oil in 2-metre (7 ft) swell. The system consists of a dampening channel that guides the oil to the recovery system on the other side of the ship. Spilled oil surrounded by oil booms can also be collected by two free-floating skimmers connected to the vessel by a flexible pipe.

As the recovery systems designed for open water can not be used efficiently or at all during wintertime, Louhi is also equipped with two recovery systems capable of collecting spilled oil from the sea in difficult ice conditions and clean ice blocks covered in oil. The main recovery system consists of three large brushes controlled by individual crane arms installed on the stern deck. The system, developed specifically for this vessel, has a sweeping width of 16 metres (52 ft) and recovers oil from the sea as the vessel moves astern in ice. In addition the vessel has two Lamor LRB-series oil recovery buckets that have large rotating brushes that resemble those of street sweepers and are used in a similar fashion. Despite their limited recovery capacity, the brush buckets operated by the ship's cranes have been proven to be effective in ice conditions in the past, such as that of Runner 4 in 2006.

The recovery tanks, equipped with heating and an inert gas system that uses nitrogen to displace explosive gases, have a total capacity of 1,200 cubic metres for spilled oil and 200 cubic metres for chemicals. In addition to recovery equipment the vessel carries 800 metres (2,625 ft) of heavy duty oil boom.

When the light components in crude oil evaporate over time, they form an explosive compound with air. For this reason special attention has been paid to prevent sparks and high surface temperatures in the ship and its equipment. In case of chemical spills, the ship can be overpressurized to prevent potentially toxic chemical substances from entering the ship and harming its crew. In such situation, the outer decks can be accessed via air locks.
