= WebGNOME =

Oil spill trajectory and fate model

- The landing page of the WebGNOME simulation model.
- Developer: National Oceanic and Atmospheric Administration
- Available in: English
- Type: Web-based interface
- License: Public domain
- Website: https://gnome.orr.noaa.gov/

The WebGNOME is a web-based application for predicting the trajectory of oil spills. Developed by the National Oceanic and Atmospheric Administration (NOAA), the WebGNOME provides a graphical interface to the General NOAA Oil Modeling Environment ("GNOME"), a software suite that provides oil spill modelling and intended to aid in offshore oil spill prevention and response efforts. The model receives several inputs, including properties of the water and wind, information about the spilt material, and (optionally) remediation techniques being employed, and projects the trajectory of the oil, along with an indication of the quantities lost to weathering, evaporation, and other processes. It is an entirely web-based interface, meaning that the user does not need to download any software to run the program; in practice, however, the user may need to have several files that can improve the accuracy of the projection, such as oceanic current and wind data, coastline data, and data concerning the properties of the oil whose spill is simulated. Both WebGNOME and GNOME are released as works of the US government and into the public domain.

The software has been used in several scientific studies throughout the twenty-first century, both to solve for hypothetical disasters in danger-prone regions and to test the software's reliability by comparing simulated data with satellite observations of actual oil spillages. However, the WebGNOME website features a disclaimer posted by NOAA, warning that the software is not to be used in a situation where failure could result in human injury or property damage. This has not deterred the usage of the model in a hobbyist and academic capacity.

== History ==
The earliest documented description of the GNOME tool in any form was in a 1999 conference paper, and was used in scientific studies as early as 2002. At this time, GNOME was a software that had to be downloaded to be used. Training courses were offered by NOAA to help in the usage of the software, and training materials were (and still are) available online through NOAA. GNOME has largely remained unchanged, with it still using both Eulerian and Lagrangian fluid flow physics, and still allowing users to simulate for both the most likely outcome ("Best Guess" solution) and for the maximum variation in extent of the trajectory ("Minimum Regret" solution). As of 2026, active development is no longer occurring on the desktop application version of GNOME, although it continues to be maintained.

The earliest mention of the WebGNOME application in scientific literature was in 2022.

== Usage ==
=== Model setup ===
The WebGNOME interface has four set-up modes, with two marked for beginners and two for more experienced users. The beginner modes are the weathering-only and location file modes. The weathering-only model simulates the spillage of oil in an infinite ocean, and this is useful primarily to study the timescale and visibility of a spill. The location file mode uses one of WebGNOME's pre-set configurations for particular locations. These are primarily only available for water bodies in American proximity. The beginner modes do not require the collation of information from third-party sources, such as coastline, current, and wind data and files. More advanced users can set up a model through one of two routes: use an operation forecast model, wherein WebGNOME sources weather data from external servers, or manual setup, where the user provides every parameter and input required for the simulation to run. This includes (among other parameters) winds, currents, coastlines, and oil properties, requiring data files in the correct format.

The WebGNOME model can simulate various weathering processes for a given oil, including dispersion, emulsification, evaporation, and sedimentation. This requires the specifications of winds and water properties, and a detailed database of the oil's properties. WebGNOME provides a link within the model setup page to the ADIOS Oil Database, wherefrom a file with details for the preferred oil can be downloaded.

=== Simulating response actions ===
WebGNOME allows the user to optionally add oil spill containment processes to the model. Three techniques are available for modelling — skimming, dispersing, and in-situ burning. These are respectively physical, chemical, and thermal methods of oil spill remediation, and have been documented extensively in scientific literature.

Skimming is a method to collect and remove oil from the surface through mechanical barriers like booms and recovery vessels. WebGNOME takes an hourly collection rate as input from the user and simply subtracts an equivalent amount at each timestep. Chemical dispersion is similarly modelled across the entire study area. In both cases, oil is assumed to be removed uniformly across the entire spill, and not particularly from any location or sub-region within it. For in-situ burning, the volume of oil removed is calculated based on two user inputs: the area and the average thickness of the oil layer burned. It is implicitly assumed that this oil is first caught by a boom, as oil allowed to freely spread will form a layer too thin to ignite. WebGNOME allows the user to simulate in-situ burning as a response action even in scenarios which would not be practically feasible in the real world. For example, waves greater than 1 metre or winds stronger than 40 knots make burning impractical. Furthermore, WebGNOME assumes all oil caught in the boom to be burned, while this does not occur in actual marine environments.

=== Results and post-processing ===
Once a model is set up completely and no errors are flagged, the fate view and map view options are available to visualise the results. The map view displays the motion of the particles on the map at each timestep as a video. Controls are available to fast-forward and rewind the animation. These particles can be overlaid against various backgrounds, including Open Street Map and Bing Maps Aerial. The fate view window displays the oil budget in the tabular and graphical formats. Users can note the individual quantities of oil lost to various natural processes and the quantity left floating. Graphs and tables in the fate view can be exported in the CSV, HTML, PNG, and PDF formats.

== Applications ==
The software has been used to model hypothetical oil spills and for case studies on real-life oil spills. For the latter, the tool is used to compare modelled results to satellite data. As WebGNOME can also simulate debris or flotsam, its applicability is extended to cases such as shipwrecks as well. A search on the Scopus database with the terms "gnome" and "oil" yields over 100 publications that use the software.

== Related projects ==
A search result on the ADIOS Oil Database for WebGNOME-compatible oils with an API gravity of exactly 30, sorted in descending order by score.

=== ADIOS ===
The ADIOS Oil Database is a repository of physical and chemical property data of over 1450 oils, compiled from numerous government bodies and companies. These can be sorted by name, API gravity, source location, and a score which estimates the completeness of the record for the respective oil. These entries can be downloaded as JSON files, which can then be uploaded into a WebGNOME model for usage.

Each oil is marked with a status indicating the reliability of the compiled data. There are three statuses: a white tick in a green circle (OK), a white exclamation mark in a yellow triangle (warning), or a red cross (errors). Oils that are compatible with WebGNOME are marked as such, with not every oil in the database usable in WebGNOME.

=== PyGNOME ===
PyGNOME is the computational engine behind the WebGNOME model. It is written in Python and C++. It can be modified and used to extend the complexity of a simulation beyond the limits WebGNOME can be used to model. Some model features in PyGNOME not present in WebGNOME include modelling oil transport in ice-infested waters, and experimental algorithms for the bioremediation of spilt oil. Users may also use their own Python code to customise the model, or adapt existing code.

The PyGNOME source code is available on GitHub, and can be installed from source — this requires an appropriate compiler. Currently, this is the only way to use PyGNOME.
