= Finnish pollution control vessel Halli =

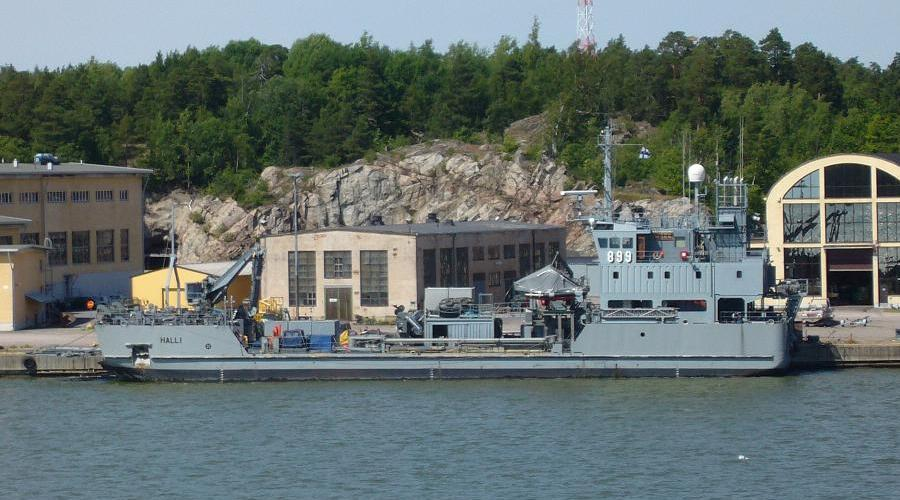
- Halli in Turku, July 2006

History

Finland
- Name: Halli
- Builder: Hollming Oy, Rauma, Finland
- Yard number: 267
- Launched: 1986
- Refit: 2010
- Identification: IMO number: 8515556; MMSI number: 230354000; Callsign: OIMX
- Status: In service

General characteristics
- Type: Oil spill response vessel
- Displacement: 2,100 tonnes
- Length: 61.5 m (201 ft 9 in)
- Beam: 12.8 m (42 ft 0 in)
- Draught: 4 m (13 ft 1 in)
- Ice class: 1A
- Propulsion: 2 × 975 kW (1,307 hp)
- Speed: 11 knots (20 km/h; 13 mph)
- Complement: 14

Halli (899) is a modified, enlarged Hylje-design, and acts as a combined pollution cleanup and vehicle transport ship. She is also operated by a civilian crew from the Ministry of Environment but is under Navy control. The vessel can act as a landing ship and logistic support vessel. The 11-metre (36 ft) bow ramp can be used to load or unload vehicles up to 48 tons. As a cleanup vessel, she can sweep a 30-metre (98 ft) path at 1.5 knots (2.8 km/h; 1.7 mph) with her MacGregor-Navire MacLORI pollution collection system. The vessel is equipped with a 360-cubic-metre (13,000 cu ft) waste-collection tank. The ship was built in 1986 and refitted in 2010.
