= Housing Finance and Development Centre of Finland =

Government agency of Finland

- Asumisen rahoitus- ja kehittämiskeskus
- Abbreviation: ARA
- Formation: January 1, 2008; 18 years ago
- Type: Governmental
- Purpose: Implementation of government housing policy
- Location: Lahti, Finland
- Coordinates: 60.9876°N 25.6618°E
- Staff: 100 (2023)
- Website: www.ara.fi/fi-FI

The Housing Finance and Development Centre of Finland (abbr. ARA, Finnish: Asumisen rahoitus- ja kehittämiskeskus) was a Finnish government agency within the jurisdiction of the Finnish Ministry of the Environment, responsible for implementing state housing policy.

ARA's tasks included granting subsidies, support, and guarantees related to housing and construction. Additionally, ARA directed and supervised the use of ARA housing stock and was involved in projects related to housing development and expertise in the housing market. ARA collected, analyzed, and disseminated information about the housing market and maintained industry networking and information services.

== History ==
In the late 1940s, after the Continuation War, the Arava system was established for financing housing construction. In 1966, Arava's tasks were transferred to the Finnish Housing Fund, and with its abolition in 1993 to the State Housing Fund.

ARA was established in its current form on January 1, 2008. As part of the latest agency reform, ARA transitioned from a state housing finance-oriented organization to a body supporting development activities and communication in the construction sector. In a decentralization program of the government, ARA was relocated from Helsinki's Pasila to Lahti on July 1, 2008, based on a decision made in 2005.

ARA was dissolved in 2025 and its duties were taken by the Ministry of Environment.

== Tasks and Activities ==
ARA's tasks included:

- Developing sustainable, high-quality, and affordable housing;
- Improving housing conditions for low- and middle-income households and special groups;
- Directing and supervising the use of publicly beneficial housing communities and the ARA housing stock;
- Developing existing housing stock and residential environments;
- Promoting, utilizing, and disseminating development activities and research related to housing conditions;
- Collecting, analyzing, and disseminating housing market information;
- Maintaining the energy performance certificate register (register of qualified energy performance certificate issuers);
- Granting renovation subsidies.

== Organisation ==
ARA was led by Director General Hannu Rossilahti. The agency employed about 100 staff. The activities of the agency were guided by a board appointed by the Council of State.

== See also ==
- Ministry of the Environment (Finland)
- Homelessness in Finland
