= Kultaranta VIII =

Presidential yacht of Finland

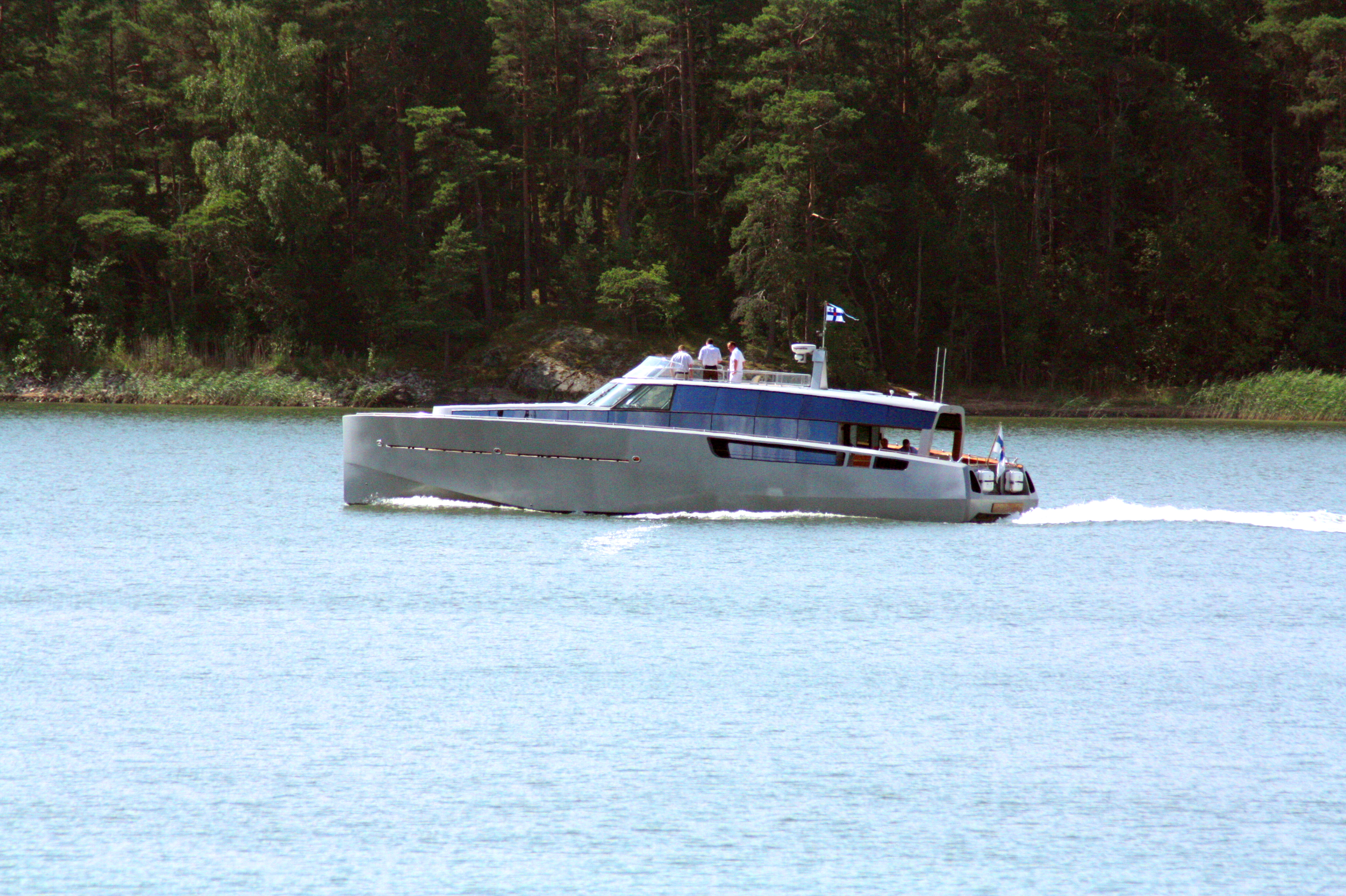
- Kultaranta VIII leaving the summer residence, 2011

History

Finland
- Name: Kultaranta VIII
- Builder: Uki Workboat, Uusikaupunki
- Cost: 1.9 million euros
- Laid down: 2007
- Commissioned: 16 May 2008
- Homeport: Pansio, Finland
- Status: In service

General characteristics
- Length: 19.3 m (63 ft)
- Beam: 5.7 m (19 ft)
- Draught: 1.45 m (4 ft 9 in)
- Depth: 3.6 m (12 ft)
- Propulsion: 4 × Volvo Penta engines, total 1,740 hp (1,298 kW)
- Capacity: 18 passengers

Kultaranta VIII is the presidential yacht of the President of Finland. It replaced the previous yacht, Kultaranta VII, in 2008. It is named after "Kultaranta", the President's summer residence.

The yacht was built by the Finnish shipbuilding company Uki Workboat in Uusikaupunki. It is 19.3 metres (63 ft) long and 5.7 metres (19 ft) wide. Its hull is made of aluminium, and the interior is mainly of wood. It is powered by four Volvo Penta engines with a total output of 1,300 kW (1,740 hp).

Laid down in 2007, the yacht was completed at a cost of around 1.9 million euro, and handed over on 16 May 2008. It is crewed by members of the Finnish Navy, and is docked at the Pansio Naval Base when not in use.
