= Ministry of the Environment (Finland) =

Government ministry of Finland

- Finnish: ympäristöministeriö Swedish: miljöministeriet
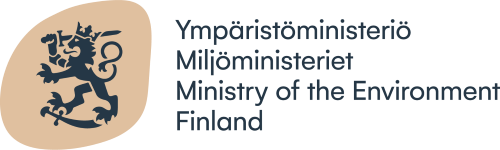

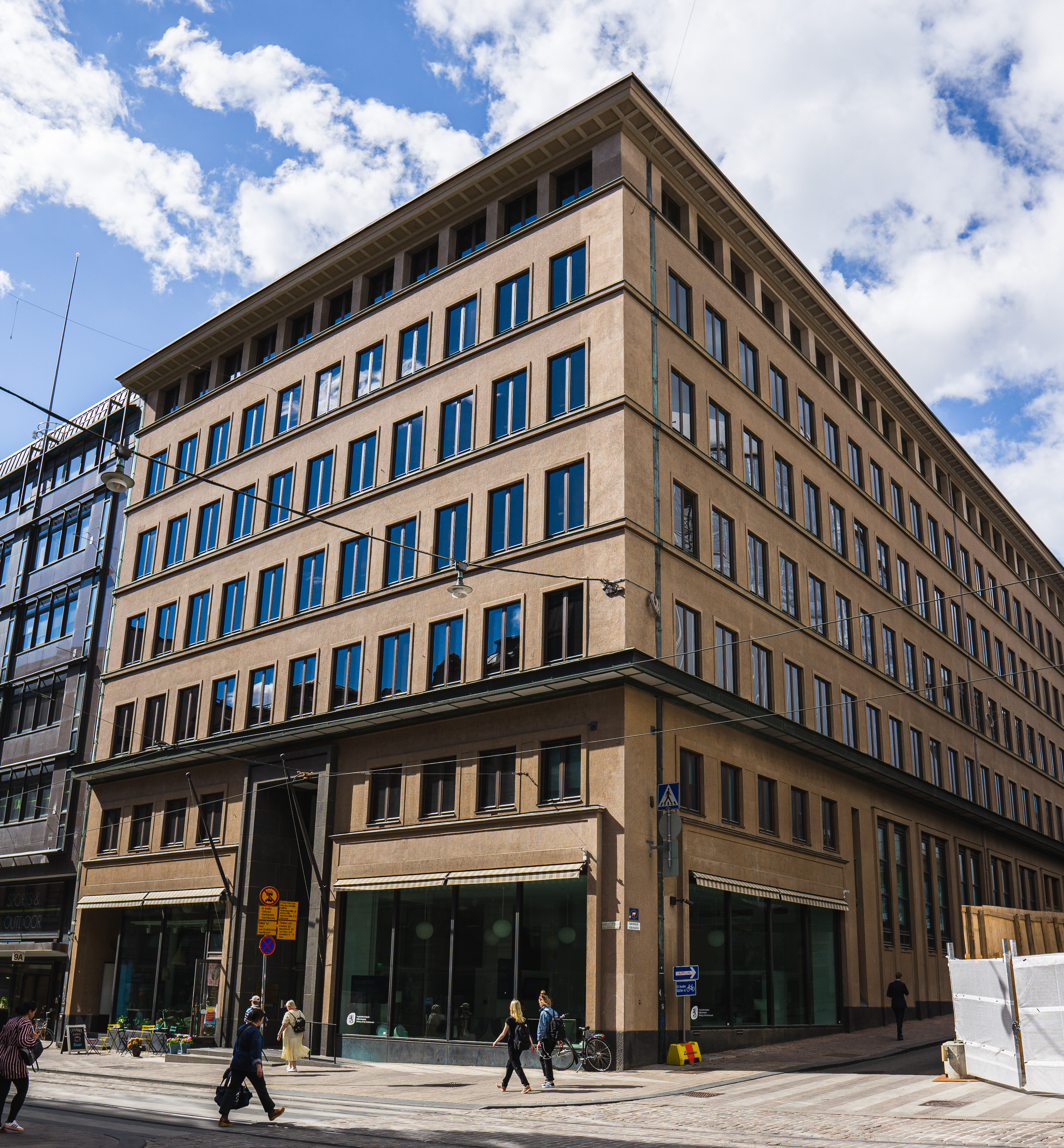
- The current location of the ministry on Aleksanterinkatu 7

Ministry overview
- Formed: 1983; 43 years ago
- Jurisdiction: Finnish Government
- Annual budget: €0.256 billion (2013)
- Minister responsible: Sari Multala, Minister of the Environment and Climate Change
- Website: www.ym.fi/en-US/The_Ministry

The Ministry of the Environment (YM, Finnish: ympäristöministeriö [ˈympæristøˌministeriø], Swedish: miljöministeriet) is one of the 12 ministries which comprise the Finnish Government. Headed by the Minister of the Environment, the ministry is responsible for preparing legal matters concerning communities, the built environment, housing, biodiversity, sustainable use of natural resources and environmental protection in Finland.

The Ministry of the Environment employs some 280 people.

The Ministry of the Environment's administrative branch includes the Finnish Environment Institute (SYKE) and the Housing Finance and Development Centre of Finland (ARA). In matters falling within its remit, the Ministry of the Environment directs the Centres for Economic Development, Transport and the Environment (ELY Centres). The Ministry also guides and funds Parks & Wildlife Finland within Metsähallitus, the state-owned enterprise administering state-owned land and water areas.

Finland founded the Ministry of the Environment in 1983, which was quite early compared to some other countries. In the 21st century, the ministry's role of planning housing has increased in importance. In 2014, the merging of the Ministry of the Environment with Ministry of Agriculture and Forestry was discussed widely. When preparing the government 2015, Sipilä, Soini and Stubb preliminarily agreed that the Ministry of Environment would be merged with Ministry of Traffic. However, the minister post was given to Kimmo Tiilikainen together with the post of Minister of Agriculture and Forestry.

Kai Mykkänen of the National Coalition Party became the new minister upon the appointment of the Orpo Cabinet in June 2023.
