= Homelessness in Finland =

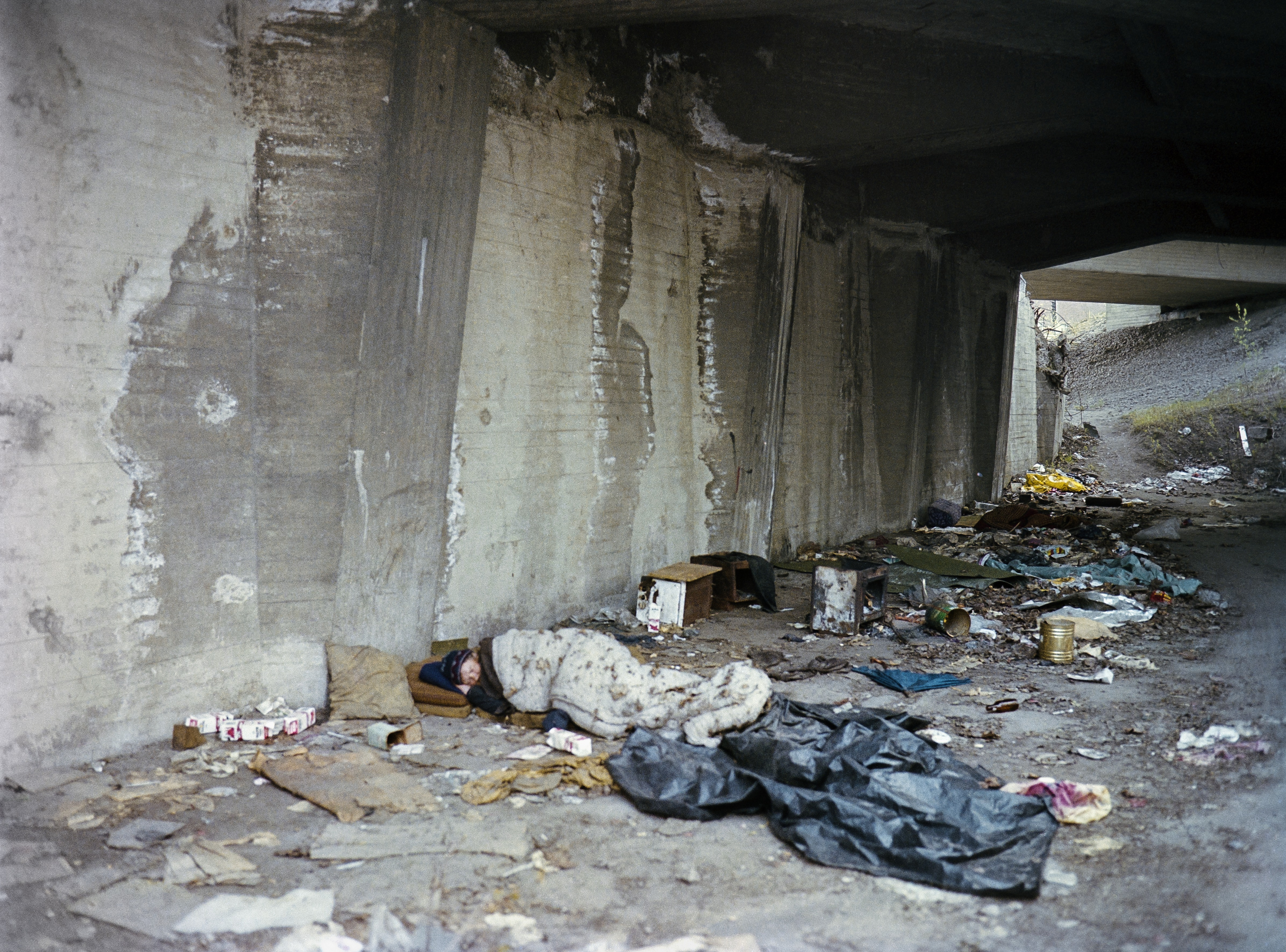
The decommissioned underpass tunnel near the gas bell of the power plant in Suvilahti, Helsinki in 1985. The tunnel served as a place for the homeless to stay in the 1980s.

Homelessness in Finland affected 4,396 people at the end of 2021. (Note: Figures reported by ARA are split among homeless people living alone and homeless people living in couples and families. The total figure of 4,396 includes both.) Long-term homelessness affected 1,318 people.

Finland and Denmark are the only European Union countries where the long term homelessness trend has been falling. Homelessness in Finland had fallen for eleven years in a row before increasing in February 2025 (figures are from previous November, but reported annually in February) due to the rising cost of living and various cuts to social security, housing and income support.

Finland has adopted a Housing First policy, whereby social services assign homeless individuals homes first, and issues like mental health and substance abuse are treated second. Since its launch in 2008, the number of homeless people in Finland has decreased by roughly 30%, though other reports indicate it could be up to 50%. The number of long-term homeless people has fallen by more than 35%. "Sleeping rough", the practice of sleeping outside, has been largely eradicated in Helsinki, where only one 50-bed night shelter remains. Analysis of Housing First in Tampere, Finland found that it saved €250,000 in one year. A further study of Finland's Housing First program found that giving a homeless person a home and support resulted in cost savings for the society of at least €15,000 per person per year, with potentially even higher cost savings in the long term. These cost savings for society are in part a result of reductions in usage of emergency healthcare, police, and the justice system when homeless people are given a home.

The Constitution of Finland mandates that public authorities "promote the right of everyone to housing". In addition, the constitution grants Finnish citizens "the right to receive indispensable subsistence and care", if needed.

Since 2002, the Night of the Homeless event has been hosted throughout the country. The events include demonstrations, food distribution, and movie screenings, among other activities.

== Statistics ==
Since 1987, the Housing Finance and Development Centre of Finland (Finnish: Asumisen rahoitus- ja kehittämiskeskus; ARA) had been publishing annual statistics related to homelessness. The figures were collected independently by the municipalities of Finland, leading to minor inconsistencies in reporting. ARA published data on homeless families and homeless people living alone separately.

The majority of homeless people reside in larger cities, notably in the capital region. Over 60 percent of Finland's homeless population resides in the Greater Helsinki area. Homelessness disproportionately affects men, although this gap has been reduced due to recent efforts. Roughly three out of four homeless individuals are male.

Some key figures for homeless people in Finland (2019) include the following:

- 21% of the homeless are considered long-term homeless (Note: ARA defined long-term homelessness as the following: "Long-term homelessness refers to a homeless person who has a significant social or a health problem, such as debt, substance abuse or mental health problems, and whose homelessness has been prolonged or is in danger of being prolonged due to a lack of conventional housing solutions and appropriate support services. Homelessness is considered long-term if it has lasted for at least one year or if the individual has repeatedly experienced homelessness over the last three years.")
- Over 70% of the homeless are male
- 18% of the homeless are young (under 25 years old)
- 24% of the homeless are immigrants

Raw data

Raw data
