= Welfare in Finland =

Finland shares with the other Nordic countries the Nordic model of social security, the hallmark of which is its comprehensiveness.

Social security or welfare in Finland is very comprehensive compared to what almost all other countries provide. In the late 1980s, Finland had one of the world's most advanced welfare systems, which guaranteed decent living conditions to all Finns. Created almost entirely during the first three decades after World War II, the social security system was an outgrowth of the traditional Nordic belief that the state is not inherently hostile to the well-being of its citizens and can intervene benevolently on their behalf. According to some social historians, the basis of this belief was a relatively benign history that had allowed the gradual emergence of a free and independent peasantry in the Nordic countries and had curtailed the dominance of the nobility and the subsequent formation of a powerful right wing. Although Finland's history was harsher than the histories of the other Nordic countries, this did not prevent the country from following their path of social development.

== History ==
In the last years of the nineteenth century, Finnish social policy had as its goal the lessening of class friction. The few existing pieces of social legislation addressed the needs of specific groups rather than of society as a whole. In the first two decades after the Finnish Civil War in 1918, little was accomplished in welfare legislation except the "Tenant Farmer Act" (torpparilaki, torparlagen), which gave tenant farmers the possibility to buy the land they used and thus get a more secure living. A woefully insufficient national pension plan was set up in 1937, as were measures to aid mothers in need. It was only after World War II that Finnish social policy acquired the characteristics that in the next decades made it similar to other Nordic systems of social welfare.

According to the Finnish sociologist Erik Allardt, the hallmark of the Nordic welfare systems is their comprehensiveness. Unlike the welfare systems of the United States or most West European countries, those of the Nordic countries cover most of the entire population, and they are not limited to those groups unable to care for themselves. Examples of this universality of coverage are national flat-rate pensions available to all once they reach a certain age, regardless of what they paid into the plan, and national health plans based on medical needs rather than financial means. In addition, the citizens of the Nordic countries have the legal right to the benefits provided by their welfare systems, the provisions of which are designed to meet what is perceived as the collective responsibility to ensure everyone a decent standard of living. The Nordic system is also distinguished by the many aspects of people's lives it affects.

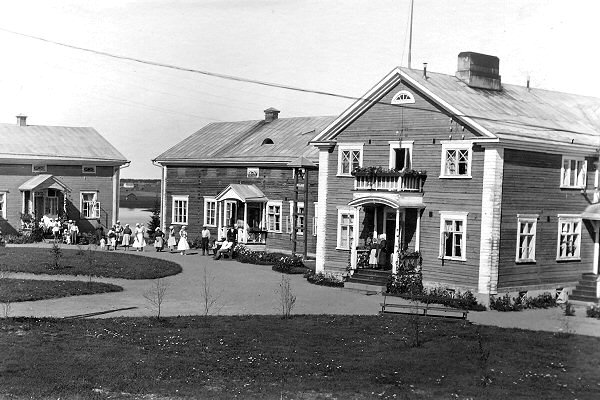
A "municipal home" for those unable to provide for themselves in Haapajärvi in pre-war Finland. The receivers of this public service, a precursor to modern social security, included many of the elderly, as private pensions were very uncommon; disabled people; single parents; and unemployed people and their families.

The Finnish welfare system differs from those of other Nordic countries mainly in that its benefits are lower in some categories, such as sickness and unemployment payments; otherwise, the Finnish system fits into the Nordic conception of social welfare. Finnish social expenditures constituted about 7 percent of the country's gross domestic product in 1950, roughly equal to what Sweden, Denmark, and Norway were spending. By the mid-1980s, Finland's social expenditures had risen to about 24 percent of GDP, compared with the other countries' respective 35, 30, and 22 percent. Less than 10 percent of these expenditures were paid for by Finnish wage earners; the remainder came roughly equally from the state and from employers. Until the second half of the 1970s, Finnish employers had paid a higher share of social outlays than their counterparts in the other Nordic countries. In response to the slowdown of the world economy after 1973, there was some shifting of social burdens to the state, which improved the competitiveness of Finnish companies abroad.

Finland's welfare system also differed from those of its neighbors in that it was put in place slightly later, and it was only fully developed in the decade after the coalition government in 1966 between the Social Democrat and the agrarian Centre Party. After World War II, the Finns directed their attention to maternal and child care. In 1957 the government established an improved national pension plan and supplemented it in the early 1960s with private pension funds. Unemployment aid was organized in 1959 and in 1960, and it was reformed in 1972. Legislation of the 1950s and the 1960s also mandated the construction of a network of hospitals, the education of more medical personnel, and from 1963 to the early 1970s, the establishment of a health insurance system. The housing allowance system expanded during the 1960s to reach ever-widening circles of the population. Health-care officials turned their focus away from hospital care in the 1970s, and they began to emphasize the use of smaller local clinics. By the 1980s, the Finnish welfare system was up to Nordic standards and had the support of most Finns. All major political parties were committed to maintaining it, and its role in Finnish society seemed secure for the coming decades.

At the end of 2017, the Social Insurance Institution of Finland (KELA) provided refunds of medical expenses to 3,764,362 people and child expense refunds to 1,003,635 people as well as 643,153 pensions, 268,537 disability benefits and 286,630 sickness allowances.

== Organization ==
In the late 1980s, the Ministry of Social Affairs and Health directed the welfare system through five departments: social insurance, social welfare, health care, temperance and alcohol policy, and labor. According to Finland's administrative tradition, it is the task of a ministry and its departments to determine policy, which is then administered by central boards. In the case of social policy, there were three central boards for social welfare, health, and labor protection. An exception to this administrative division was the Social Security Institute, which supervised the national pension plan and health insurance for the Eduskunta and the Council of State.

The actual supplier of social care is usually the local government—-the municipality—-supervised by authorities at the provincial level. In the early 1980s, funds from the state made up about 30 percent of the money spent on all social services and pensions, while employers supplied about 40 percent; local governments, 15 percent; and the recipients of services, the remainder.

== Income security programmes classified as social insurance ==
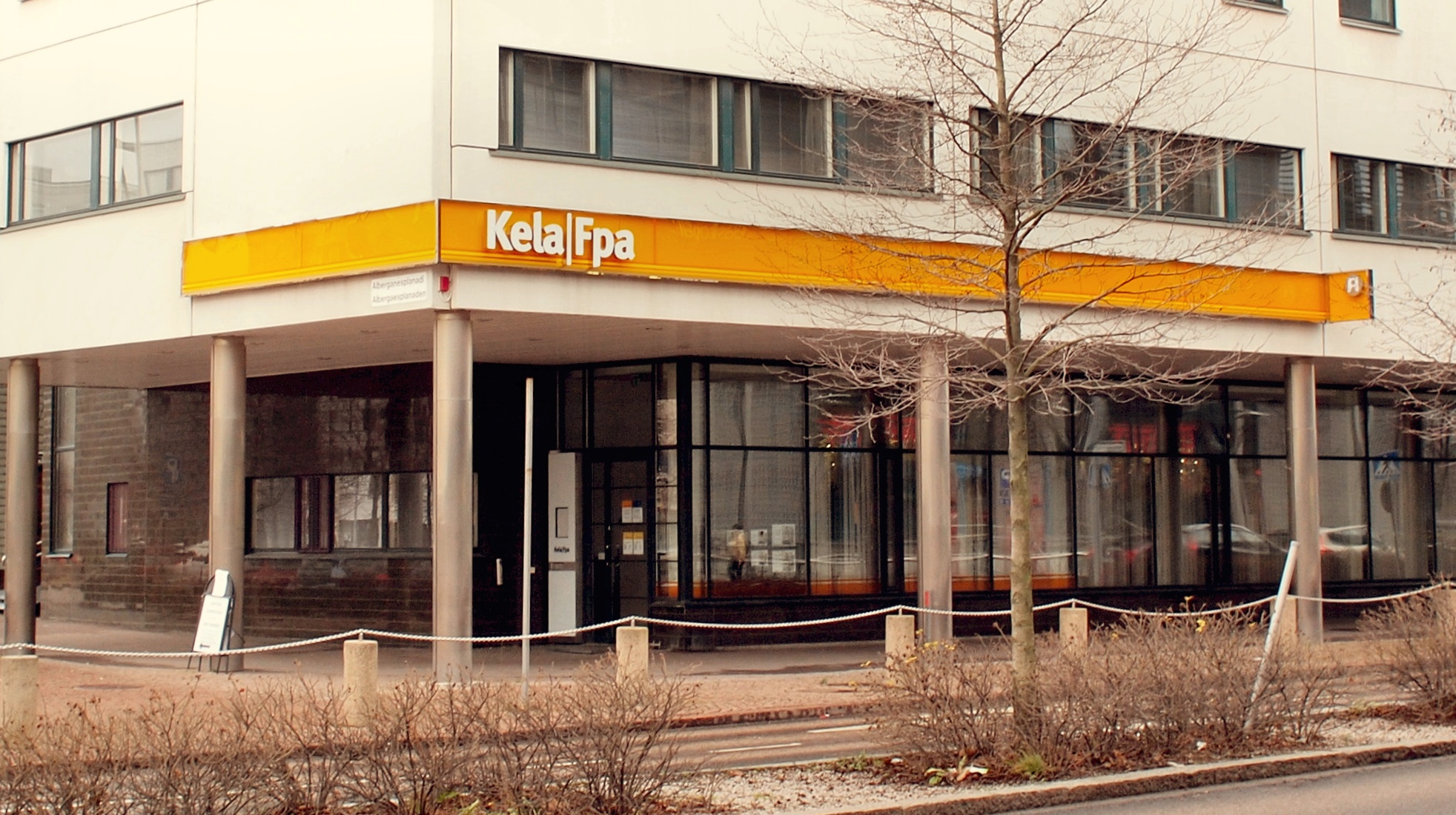
An office of the Social Insurance Institution (KELA) in Espoo. Its original function was as the provider of national retirement benefits. Later its functions have been expanded to include unemployment insurance and student grants among other things.

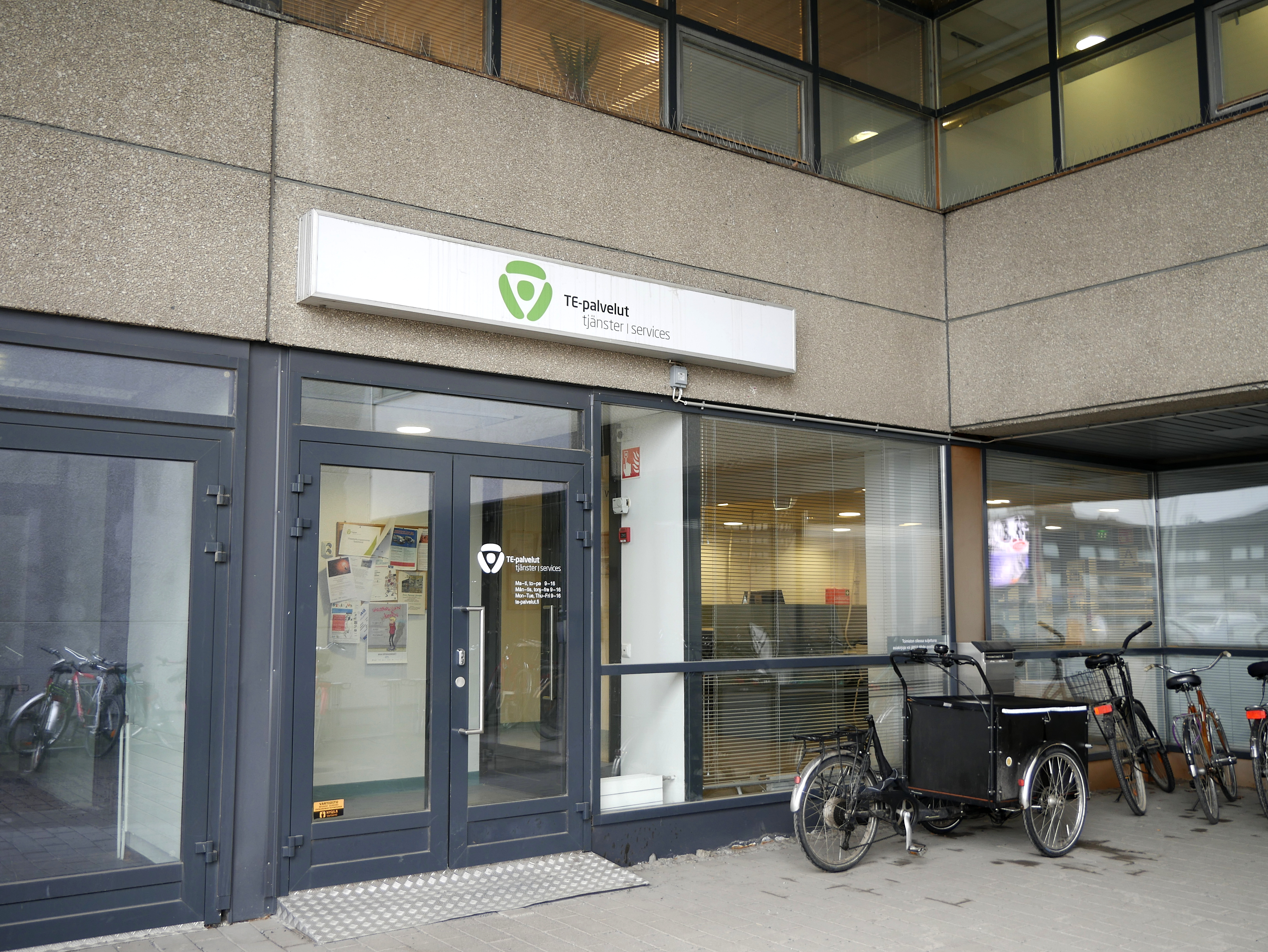
Work and Economic Development Office

Finland, like the other Nordic countries, divides most of its social programmes into those that guarantee income security and those that provide social and health services. Income security programmes come in two categories: social insurance, which provides income despite old age, illness, pregnancy, unemployment, or work-related injuries; and income security classified as welfare, which consists of income transfers to aid families through measures such as child payments, maternity grants, payments to war victims and their survivors, and financial aid to those afflicted by disability or pressing needs. Programs of the first category, income security guarantees, take some 80 percent of the funds expended for social welfare.

=== National pension plan ===
Finland's first national old-age pension plan dates from 1937, but it was so poorly funded that a new National Pensions Act was put into effect in 1957. In the late 1980s, this law, somewhat reformed, was still the basis of Finland's National Pension Plan, which was open to all residents over the age of sixteen, even to those who had never paid into it. Even those foreigners not from the Nordic countries were entitled to this pension if they had resided in Finland for at least five years. Those who left for residence in a country outside Nordic Europe, even those who were Finnish citizens, could receive the pension for only one year. The flat-rate national pension could be paid as an old-age pension, once a person reached the age of sixty five; as an invalidity pension (either full or partial) to those between the ages of sixteen and sixty-four who were no longer able to work; or, in some cases, to the long-term unemployed who were in their late fifties or early sixties. In addition to these classes of beneficiaries, survivors of those eligible for national pensions who were not themselves eligible for the pensions could receive pensions under the terms of the Survivor's Pension Plan. Also tied to the National Pension Plan were payments for handicapped children living at home and for some combat veterans of World War II.

Payments of the national pension are uniform for everyone. To this amount the assistance payment was added, which varied according to a pensioner's marital status, the cost of living in his or her locality, and other pensions that he or she received. Other supplementary payments could be made for dependent children, for degree of disability, and for housing costs, as well as for veterans of the Civil War and of World War II. National pensions are indexed, and they increase in value each year. Since reforms of the early 1980s, national pensions became non-taxable if they were the sole source of income. Pensions were no longer affected by a spouse's earnings or pension income, and the national pension could only be reduced by income from other pensions. The National Pension Plan was funded by the beneficiary's own contributions, about 2 percent of his or her locally taxable income, and by employer contributions of 4 to 5 percent of the insured person's wages.

=== Employee pension plans ===
The Employees' Pensions Act was passed in 1961 to supplement the National Pension Plan which, while adequate for Finns living in the countryside–a majority of the population until the 1960s–did not provide enough benefits for city dwellers. During the next decade, other compulsory wage-related pension plans were enacted into law for temporary employees, for national and local government employees, for those working for a state church, and for the self-employed. At the end of the decade, a supplementary plan was created for farmers as well. Seamen had had an income-based plan since 1956, and, as of 1986, those active in freelance professions such as acting and writing also obtained coverage. These employment pension plans were completely funded by the employers, private or public, who paid contributions, equal on the average to about 10 percent of a worker's earnings, into funds managed by seven large insurance companies or who set up funds on their own. Self-employed persons had to choose a fund. The Central Pension Security Institute was responsible for keeping records about employment and benefits.

The normal age of pensionable retirement was sixty-five, and the pension paid was based on the average earnings one had received in the last four years of work ending two years before retirement. One could receive up to 60 percent of private-sector earnings and up to 66 percent of public-sector earnings. Older employees, at work before these pension plans became effective, were guaranteed a minimum pension of at least 29 percent if they retired before 1975, and 37 percent if they retired after this date. Like the national pension, wage-related pensions were indexed, and they increased each year. In addition, there were provisions relating to disability, early or late retirement, and survivors' benefits similar to those in effect for the National Pension Plan.

=== Sickness insurance ===
The Sickness Insurance Act of 1963 introduced health insurance to Finland in two stages. First, beginning in 1964 it provided payments when wages were lost because of illness or maternity leave and payments for the cost of treatment and medicine. Three years later, it began paying doctors' bills as well. Until the act went into effect, only a small minority of the population, generally those employed by large firms, had medical insurance.

All persons resident in Finland for more than a short time were eligible for benefits. Foreigners had to register with the local health authorities to receive payments. In the 1980s, the daily payment made to make up for losses of income due to illness averaged about 80 percent of a typical wage and could last for as many as 300 workdays. Highly paid individuals received less. Hospital care in public hospitals was generally free, and other compensation amounted to 60 percent of doctors' fees, 75 percent of laboratory expenses, and 50 percent of medicine costs. In the mid-1980s, dental care was free for anyone born after 1961, but for others it was paid only if dental problems had to be treated to cure a disease. Maternity leave payments amounted to about 80 percent of income for about one year, and could begin five weeks before the estimated date of the birth. Fathers could take some of this time, with a corresponding cut in the days allowed to the mother. Sickness insurance was funded by the recipients themselves through their payment of about two percent of their locally taxable income, by employers who paid a contribution of about one percent of the employee's wages, and by the state.

However generous these benefits appeared in an international context, medical fees had increased in the 1970s and the 1980s, and government compensation rates had not kept pace. Rates increased by 25 percent in 1986, but not enough according to some critics. Those who pressed for government relief believed it necessary even though public medical care, which constituted the bulk of medical care in Finland, was already highly subsidized and hence rather cheap compared with many other countries.

=== Unemployment insurance ===
The Unemployment Security Act of 1984 reformed the unemployment assistance system that had been gradually worked out to deal with the persistent problem of unemployment in Finland. The act arranged for coverage of all unemployed between the ages of seventeen and sixty-four, resident in Finland, whose income came from wages earned doing work for another person or legal entity. A person had to be in need to receive payments under the terms of the act and could be disqualified because of a spouse's earnings. The self-employed, full-time students, and people receiving pensions or maternity allowances were not eligible, nor were those who were unemployed because of illness, injury, or handicap, or who had quit work voluntarily, who had lost work because of labor disputes, or who had refused to accept employment.

Those eligible for unemployment benefits receive them in two ways. A basic daily allowance of about €25 goes to any person looking for employment. This allowance was means-tested, and the income of a spouse could disqualify a potential beneficiary. The allowance lasts as long as the recipient is unemployed. Those unemployed who are members of an unemployment fund (about 80 percent of Finns are) and who have worked for at least 26 weeks in the preceding 2 years are eligible for more substantial benefits amounting to the daily basic allowance plus 45 percent of the difference between their daily wage and the basic allowance. After 100 days the payment is reduced by 20 percent. Beneficiaries of the income-related allowance could receive it for 500 days in a four-year period. Workers in their late fifties and older who had been unable to find work can be granted an unemployment pension equal to a disability pension until they reached the age when they would be eligible for an old-age pension. Unemployment benefits are administered by the Social Security Institute. The basic allowance is completely financed by the state. Employers and the state fund equal shares of 95 percent of the income-related payments and the beneficiary is responsible for the remaining five percent.

As of the end of 2017, Finland has paid out more than €4,491 million of unemployment benefits to 369,100 persons, by so providing financial support for 11% of Finnish population between 18 and 64.

According to surveys, Finnish citizens generally favor the implementation of universal basic income: in September 2015, the positive attitude towards basic income was shared by 69 percent of respondents. Since the first day of January 2017, the Basic Income Experiment, which requires a €560 unconditional monthly payment for 2000 randomly chosen unemployed Finnish citizens, was launched for the 2017-2018 period. The payment is roughly equal to the average Finnish unemployment benefit; it does not affect the other social security benefits and is being paid even if a recipient becomes employed. The experiment is organized by the Social Insurance Institution of Finland (KELA) and supervised by Olli Kangas, the head of its Research Department. In April 2018, the government rejected the call for Basic Income Experiment's extra funding; the results of the project will be announced at the end of 2020. While employment levels did not increase, participants reported higher well-being.

=== Worker's compensation ===
An employee who suffers work-related injuries is financially protected through payments that covered medical and rehabilitation expenses and fully match his or her wages. If injuries resulted in permanent disability, the worker can receive payments amounting to 85 percent of his or her wages for total disability. Survivors are eligible for pensions, as well as a sizable funeral grant. This compulsory programme is entirely funded by the employer.

== Income security classified as welfare ==
In addition to the above benefits that are classified as income security in the form of social insurance, there are income security programs classified as welfare. One of the differences between the two classes of social programs is that the welfare measures are financed mostly through taxes, whereas social insurance programs are paid for by employers and employees. This second category of income security also consists of payments to those eligible. The most important and expensive class of these benefits involves payments to families with children. Other programs assist those who have suffered war injuries and their dependents, provide financial aid to those called up for military service and to their families, make payments to the handicapped that help them earn their living, and provide living allowances that are the last resort of those unable to earn their way.

=== Family aid ===
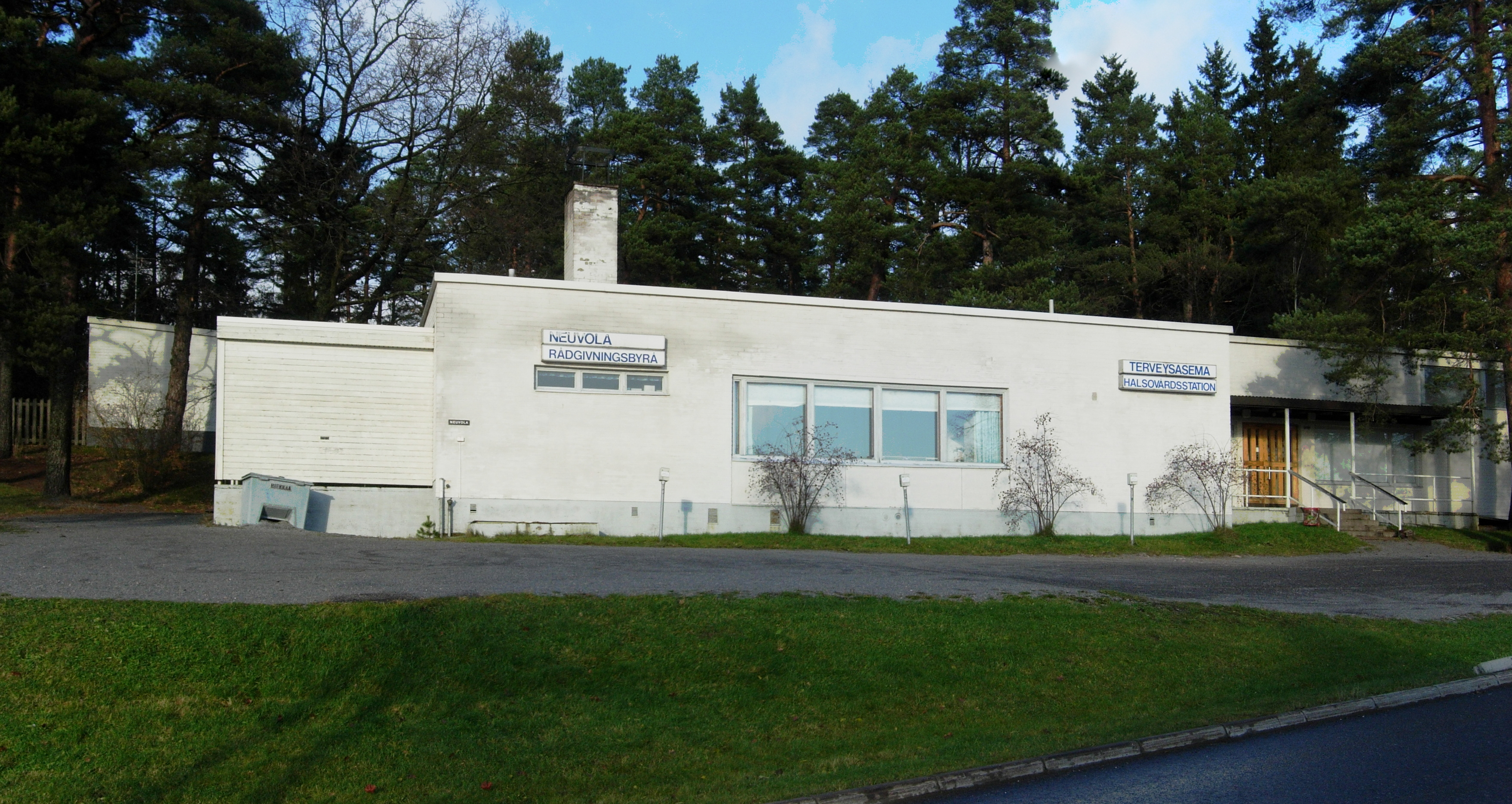
Aid to families takes many forms. All parents receive information, support, health and parenting advice, vaccinations and such before and after the child's birth from the state-run child health clinics. They also monitor the physical, mental and social condition of children and gather data for public health purposes.

Financial aid to families with children comes in the form of child allowances, child care and maintenance allowances, and maternity benefits. Child allowances dated from the 1930s, and they were one of the oldest parts of the welfare system. The law in force in the late 1980s was the Child Allowance Act of 1948, which arranged for payments to parents for all children under the age of sixteen and resident in Finland, regardless of the wealth or nationality of the parents. Child-care allowances had been paid since the 1970s to those parents who stayed at home to care for small children or who had engaged someone else to do so. A child maintenance allowance is paid when a court-ordered maintenance payment for a child of divorced parents was not being paid. A maternity benefit, based on legislation of the 1930s, was paid for each pregnancy. It came either as a grant or as a much more valuable set of materials, the maternity package, needed to tend a child. It was withheld if the mother did not visit a clinic by the fifth month of pregnancy.

=== Welfare services ===
In addition to the above measures that involve financial payments to achieve social ends, the system of social care provides welfare services. By the mid-1980s, some 90,000 state and local employees were using about five percent of Finland's gross national product to deliver a wide variety of social services under the overall direction of the Ministry of Social Affairs and Health. The expansion of the welfare system in the 1960s and the 1970s had caused the number of social workers roughly to triple between 1970 and 1985. Since 1981 workers entering the field had been required to have university training.

National government subsidies of from 30 to 60 percent of costs had the goal of making social services uniform throughout the country, so that residents of even the most isolated community had the same range of services as were offered in Helsinki, though this aim was not always met. Social services were usually free, and they were available to anyone who wanted them, irrespective of the recipient's income. Information furnished to social workers was confidential and could not be released, even to another government agency. The ultimate aim of welfare services was to increase the quality of life and the independence of the client so that welfare services were no longer needed.

The Social Welfare Act of 1982 replaced some older laws; it charged local government with providing such social services as general and family counseling and with making housing available to those needing it, most notably the aged and the infirm, troubled youth, and alcoholics. The law detailed local responsibilities for assigning specialists to assist persons living at home but no longer fully able to take care of themselves and for maintaining institutions for persons, be they aged, mentally handicapped, or addicted, whose afflictions were so serious that they could no longer live at home.

=== Child-care services ===
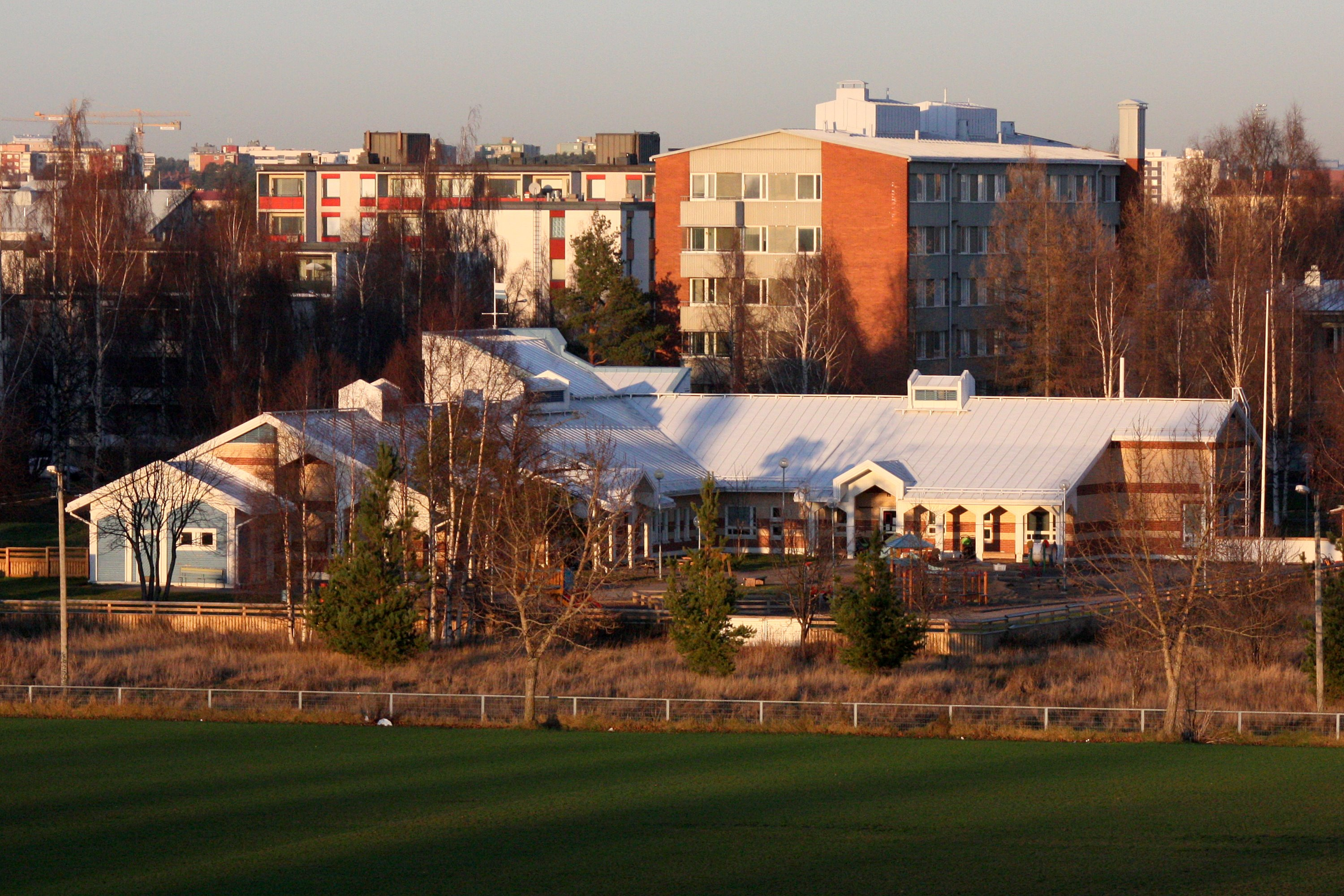
Publicly run crèches/daycare centres are available, by law, to all Finnish families. They charge relatively low fees, also based on law. Availability of quality day care (the staff are university-educated in early childhood education) has allowed the female population to pursue careers more commonly than in other parts of the world.

A law with far-reaching effects was the 1973 Child Day Care Act, which stipulated that all local governments were to provide good child day care for all families that desired it. The care for children up to seven years of age could be given either in crèche/daycare centres, sometimes private but generally run by local governments, or by accredited baby-sitters, either at the child's home or outside it. Although the number of places for day care had more than doubled to 100,000 by the mid-1980s, it would have had to double again to meet total needs. A 1985 law set the goal of being able to allow, by 1990, all parents of children up to the age of three the choice between home-care payments or a place for their child in a crèche/daycare centre. One parent could also take unpaid employment leave until the child's third birthday. The Child Welfare Act of 1983 enjoined local governments to look after children, and it empowered them to take a variety of measures if a child was being seriously neglected or abused. In the mid-1980s, about 2 percent of Finnish children were affected by this law. Another 1983 law made the corporal punishment of children illegal, as it was in the other Nordic countries.

=== Services for the disabled ===
The Welfare of the Disabled Act of 1946 set the responsibilities for treatment of the physically handicapped. The institutions that offered housing, occupational training, sheltered working environments, and physical rehabilitation were overseen by the National Board of Social Welfare, while about a score of schools for handicapped children unable to attend ordinary schools was supervised by the National Board of Schools. Special equipment, like prostheses, was supplied at no cost, as were such services as the adaptation of living areas. In the late 1980s, there were some 30,000 mentally handicapped Finns, 10,000 of whom received welfare ranging from living accommodations in an institution to day-center care or jobs in sheltered workshops. There were not enough places to accommodate all the mentally disabled properly, so some were placed in private homes or in retirement homes.

=== Services for substance abusers ===
The Welfare for Intoxicant Abusers Act of 1985 dealt mainly with alcoholism, as it was the only serious problem of substance abuse in Finland in the late 1980s. Finnish society had traditionally not seen alcohol as a part of daily life, but rather as something consumed on special occasions and then to the point of intoxication. Medical evidence of this harmful habit was that the Finnish incidence of death by acute alcohol poisoning was seven times that of Sweden and twenty times that of Denmark. Because of its troubled relationship with alcohol, the country enforced prohibition from 1919 to 1931. A later measure against alcohol consumption was a 1976 law that banned liquor advertisements in most publications. Another measure increased the cost of alcohol by taxing it heavily, so much so that by the mid-1980s liquor taxes were an important out source of state revenues.

In the 1980s, there were still many abstainers in Finland who had moral objections to alcohol use, in contrast to the small minority of drinkers who accounted for more than half of total national consumption. In the late 1960s, a relaxation of the rules for the purchase of alcohol had as its goal a lessening of drink's glamorous appeal because it was, in a sense, forbidden. This policy may have backfired when sales of beer in grocery stores and the availability of hard liquor at more restaurants caused alcohol consumption to more than double within a decade. Since the mid-1970s, however, analysts of Finnish alcohol use have seen consumption rates level off and drinking habits become more moderate. Although the number of abstainers had dropped sharply in the postwar period, causing some sociologists to refer to Finns who became adults in the 1950s and the 1960s as "the wet generation," alcohol was gradually coming to take a more ordinary place in everyday life.

The Ministry of Social Affairs and Health had a special department concerned with substance abuse, the Department of Temperance and Alcohol Policy, that formulated welfare plans and directed the State Alcohol Monopoly responsible for the manufacture, importation, and sale of alcohol. Local authorities provided a variety of facilities for alcoholics—including clinics, half-way houses, and emergency housing open twenty-four hours a day that offered withdrawal treatments. When necessary, alcoholics could be confined against their will, but this practice was less common in the late 1980s than it had been previously. State welfare was supplemented by private and voluntary associations, such as Alcoholics Anonymous.

=== Student welfare services ===
The Student Welfare Act (2013) ensures students' access to services like psychologists, social workers, and healthcare which uses a preventative and collaborative approach to well-being. There are two types of student welfare services, the communal student welfare and individual student welfare. Schools, parents and welfare teams work together to support students health to create a positive education environment. Finland's student welfare policies is based on high-learning outcomes, decentralized governance, and a focus on equity through public spending. Finland’s welfare framework also includes a strong emphasis on inclusive and special-needs education through a three-tier support system, which are: general, intensified, and special support. This is aimed to diversify teaching for different students' needs for inclusivity. The National Institute for Health and Welfare is responsible for coordinating and developing national student welfare services in collaboration with the Finnish National Agency for Education, with the oversight of The Regional State Administrative Agencies to ensure coherence with the curriculum.

Education is free for all levels, and students can receive financial aid including a study grant, state-guaranteed student loan, and housing support. In higher education, free healthcare are provided to all students of all levels. Children receive free dental care until the age of 18 and vaccinations are given with parental consent. Free school meals are provided for students through the end of upper secondary education, while higher education students can receive meal aids through the national social security institution, Kela. These welfare services are aimed to reduce socio-economic disparities and promote equity in learning environments. However, recent years have faced challenges, particularly in mental health service access, with reports of long queues for youth psychological support and uneven availability of school-based mental health professionals across municipalities.

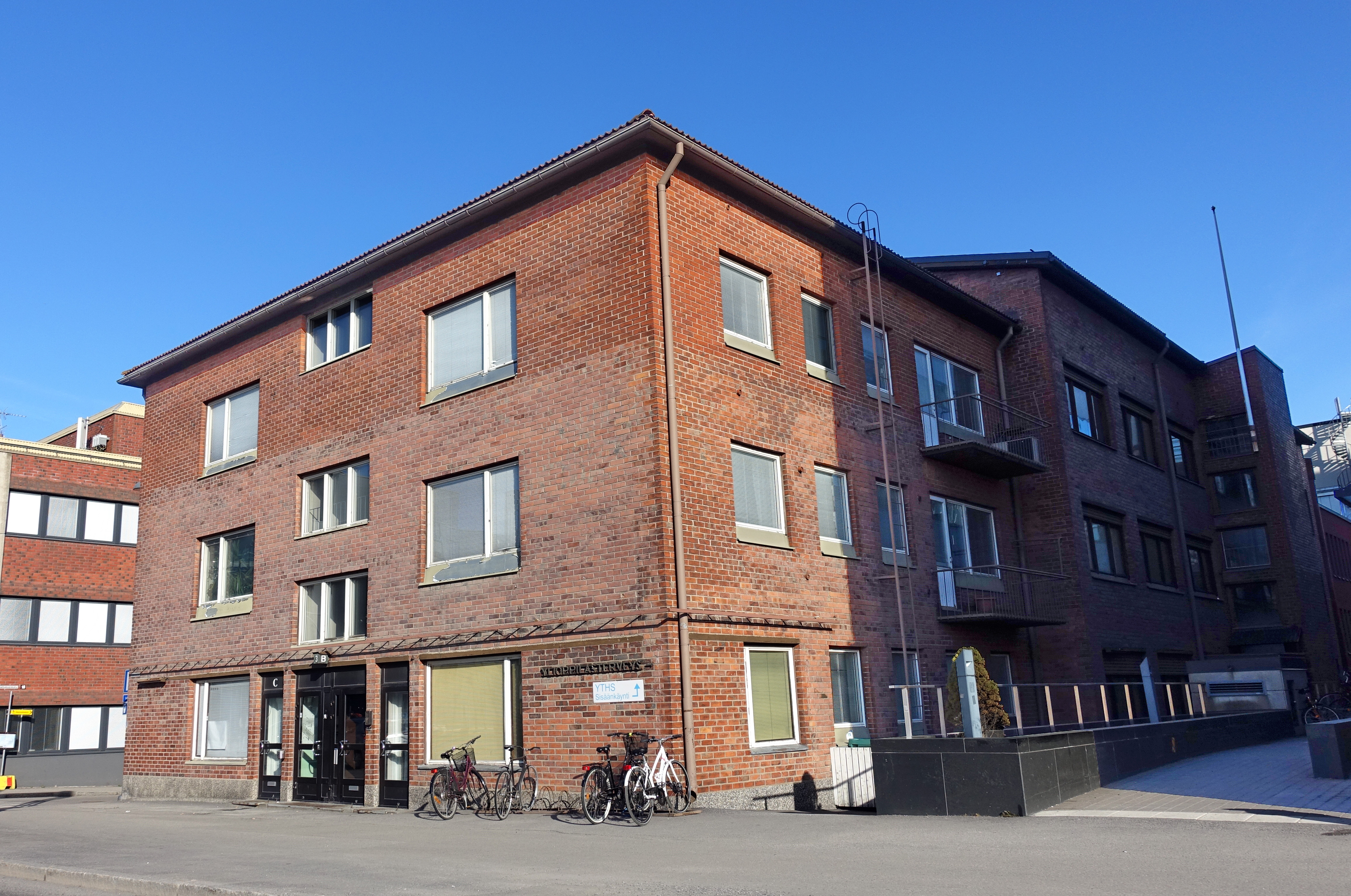
Finnish Student Health Service (YTHS) Tampere

The 2025 Finnish Government, led by Prime Minister Petteri Orpo, plans to reform how student welfare services are organized and delivered. Early in the government term, a full review was carried out to examine how effective and cost-efficient current services are. The results may lead to changes that allow municipalities to take a larger role in organizing student welfare. The government also plans legislative updates to make services more consistent across the country, improve information sharing between authorities, and ensure students can access support without long waiting times. Cooperation between different agencies will be strengthened. In addition, the Finnish Student Health Service (YTHS) will be more closely linked with the wider health and social welfare system so that student health care is better coordinated. These reforms are intended to clarify the roles of central government, municipalities, and wellbeing services counties in supporting children and young people.

== Health system ==
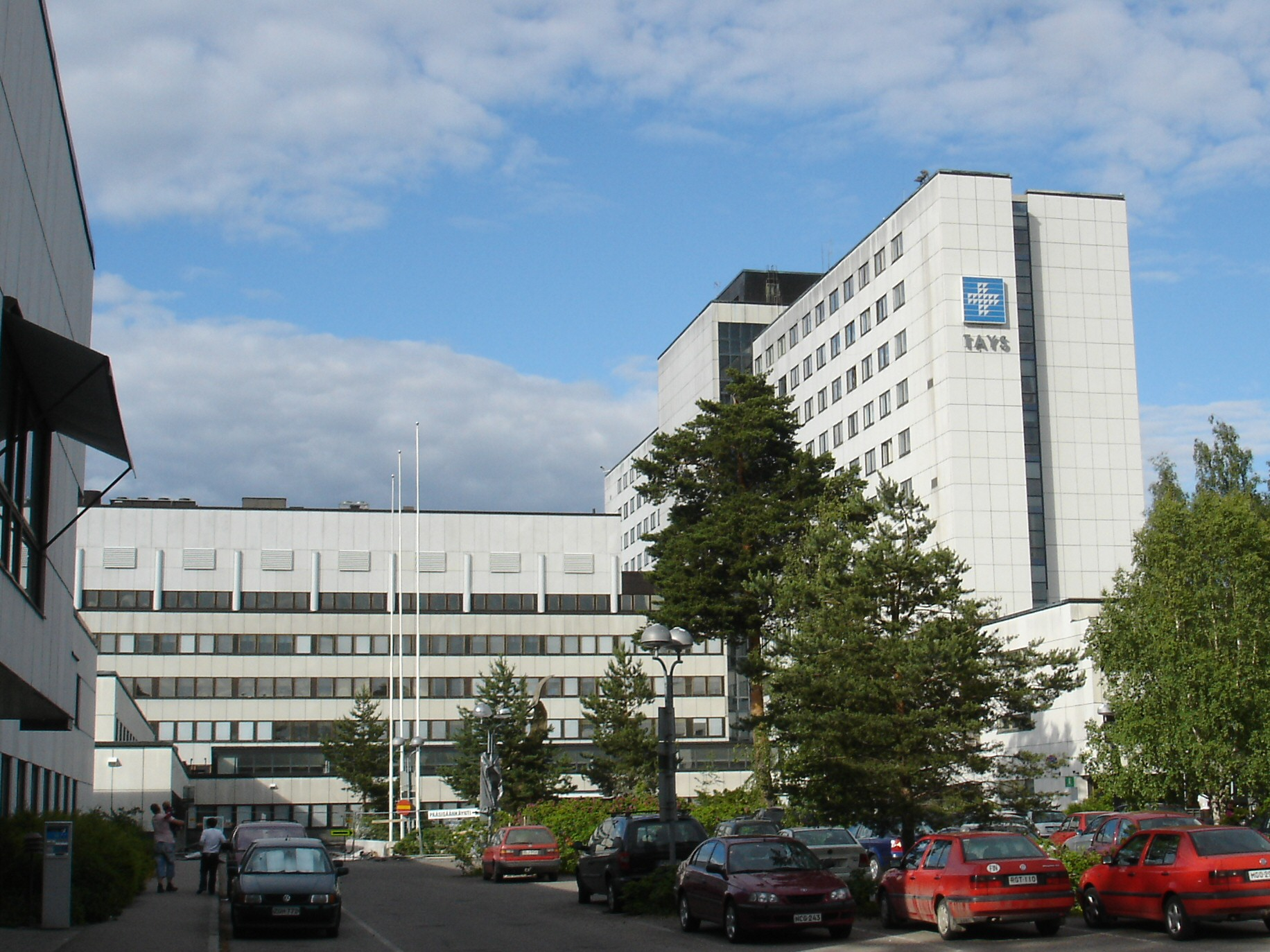
The University Hospital of Tampere serves the second most populous metropolitan area in Finland. University hospitals and central hospitals administer more demanding forms of health care to patients from around the surrounding region. They are all publicly run and charge little or nothing from the patients, instead receiving their funding from the state and the municipalities.

By the second half of the 1980s, Finns enjoyed a standard of health fully comparable to that of other highly developed countries. If health standards did not match those of Finland's Nordic neighbors in all areas, it was because Sweden, Denmark, and Norway were the world's leaders in health care. Finland had made remarkable progress, however, and was rapidly catching up. In one major area, the prevention of infant mortality, Finland led the world in the mid-1980s: it had the world's lowest infant mortality rate.

=== Development of the health system ===
Since becoming an independent state in 1917, Finland has managed to deal with the "traditional" health problems. The most important cause of death in the nineteenth century, pulmonary tuberculosis, was brought under control by means of a network of tuberculosis hospitals built between the world wars. Smallpox and pneumonia have also ceased to be serious problems. With the aid of the vaccination law passed in 1952, the fight against communicable diseases was largely won. In 1980, for example, there were no deaths from common diseases of this type. By the mid-1980s, no cases of diphtheria had been registered in Finland for several decades, and, with the exception of a mini-epidemic of seven cases in 1983–84, poliomyelitis also had disappeared. An emphasis on hospital construction in the 1950s and 1960s brought the ratio of hospital beds per capita up to international norms, and new medical training centers more than doubled the number of physicians between 1970 and the mid-1980s. The passage of the Sickness Insurance Act in 1963 and frequent expansion of its coverage meant that good medical care was available to everyone. Later legislative measures, such as the Primary Health Care Act of 1972, or the Mental Health Act of 1978, aimed at moving health care from large centers, increasing the amount of preventive treatment at smaller local facilities, and favoring out-patient care when possible. Finnish health authorities believed, even in the late 1980s, that care of this kind could be more flexible, humane, and effective and could also check cost increases. Despite this policy innovation, however, social expenditures on health had increased ten-fold in real terms since the early 1950s.

=== Organization of the health system ===
Health care is directed by the Ministry of Social Affairs and Health and administered by the National Board of Health. In accordance with government practices, the ministry decides policy, and the national board determines how it will be administered. Actual delivery of care is the responsibility of local government, especially after the Primary Health Care Act of 1972, which stipulated that the basis of medical treatment should be the care offered in local health clinics. Previously, the emphasis had been on care from large regional hospitals.

The 1972 law resulted in the creation of about 200 local health centers each of which served a minimum of 10,000 persons. As municipalities varied greatly in size, small ones had to unite with others to form health centers, while about half the centers were operated by a single municipality. Centers did not necessarily consist of a single building, but encompassed all the health facilities in the health center district. With the exception of some sparsely settled regions, people were usually within twenty-five kilometers of the center charged with their care.

A basic aim of the 1972 law was to give all Finns equal access to health care, regardless of their income or where they lived. Because most services of health centers were free, subsidies from the national government were required to augment the financial resources of municipalities. The subsidies varied according to the wealth of the municipality and ranged roughly from 30 to 65 percent of costs. By the mid-1980s, about 40 percent of the money spent on health went for primary care, compared with 10 percent in 1972.

Health care centers were responsible for routine care such as health counseling, examinations, and screening for communicable diseases; they also provided school health services, home care, dental work, and child and maternal care. Most health centers had at least three physicians and additional staff at a ratio of about eleven per physician. Because of the high level of their training, nurses performed many services done by physicians in other countries. Most centers had midwives, whose high competence, combined with an extensive program of prenatal care, made possible Finland's extremely low infant mortality rate, the world's best at 6.5 deaths per 1,000 births.

Once it was established that a health problem could not be treated adequately at a center, patients were directed to hospitals, either to one of about thirty local hospitals with some degree of specialization, or to one of about twenty hospitals, five of which were university teaching hospitals, that could offer highly specialized care. In addition, there were institutions with a single concern, such as the sixty psychiatric hospitals, and others that dealt with orthopedics, epilepsy, rheumatism, or plastic surgery. Given the great drop in the incidence of tuberculosis in Finland, the country's dozen sanatoria were gradually being taken over for other purposes. Hospitals were usually operated by federations of municipalities, as their maintenance was beyond the power of most single municipalities. By the mid-1980s, the country's public hospitals had about 50,000 beds, and its 40-odd private hospitals had roughly 3,000. There were another 20,000 beds for patients at health centers, homes for the elderly, and other welfare institutions.

The Social Insurance Institution of Finland (KELA) is concerned with the reimbursement system for licensed doctors' work. Reimbursements can also cover the part of diagnostics and private-sector healthcare treatments, such as dental services.

== See also ==
- Homelessness in Finland
- Nordic model

General:

- Social model
