= Uki Workboat =

Finnish shipyard

Uki Workboat Oy
- Company type: Osakeyhtiö
- Founded: 1987; 39 years ago
- Headquarters: Uusikaupunki, Finland
- Key people: Juha Granqvist (Managing Director)
- Services: Shipbuilding
- Revenue: ▼€14,886,000 (2022); €20,708,000 (2021; 18 months)
- Net income: ▼€703,000 (2022); €1,043,000 (2021; 18 months)
- Number of employees: 42 (12/2022)
- Website: www.tyovene.com

Uki Workboat Oy (Finnish: Uudenkaupungin Työvene Oy) is a Finnish shipyard located in Uusikaupunki on the Western coast of Finland. The company specializes in small and medium-sized vessels for professional use, ranging from aluminium-hulled workboats to steel-hulled multipurpose ships and road ferries. The facilities consist of one 100-metre (330 ft) slipway and production halls where boats up to a length of 30 metres (98 ft) can be manufactured indoors.

Most of the shipyard's newbuildings are one-off products, but smaller boats have also been built in series of up to 18 vessels. As of 2018, Uki Workboat has delivered over 220 vessels with the largest being the Finnish pollution control vessel Louhi, which was delivered in 2011. The company also built the presidential yacht of the President of Finland, Kultaranta VIII.

Whereas the Finnish name of the company uses the full name of the city where the shipyard is located, the English-language name contains the commonly used shorter nickname Uki.

== Ships ==
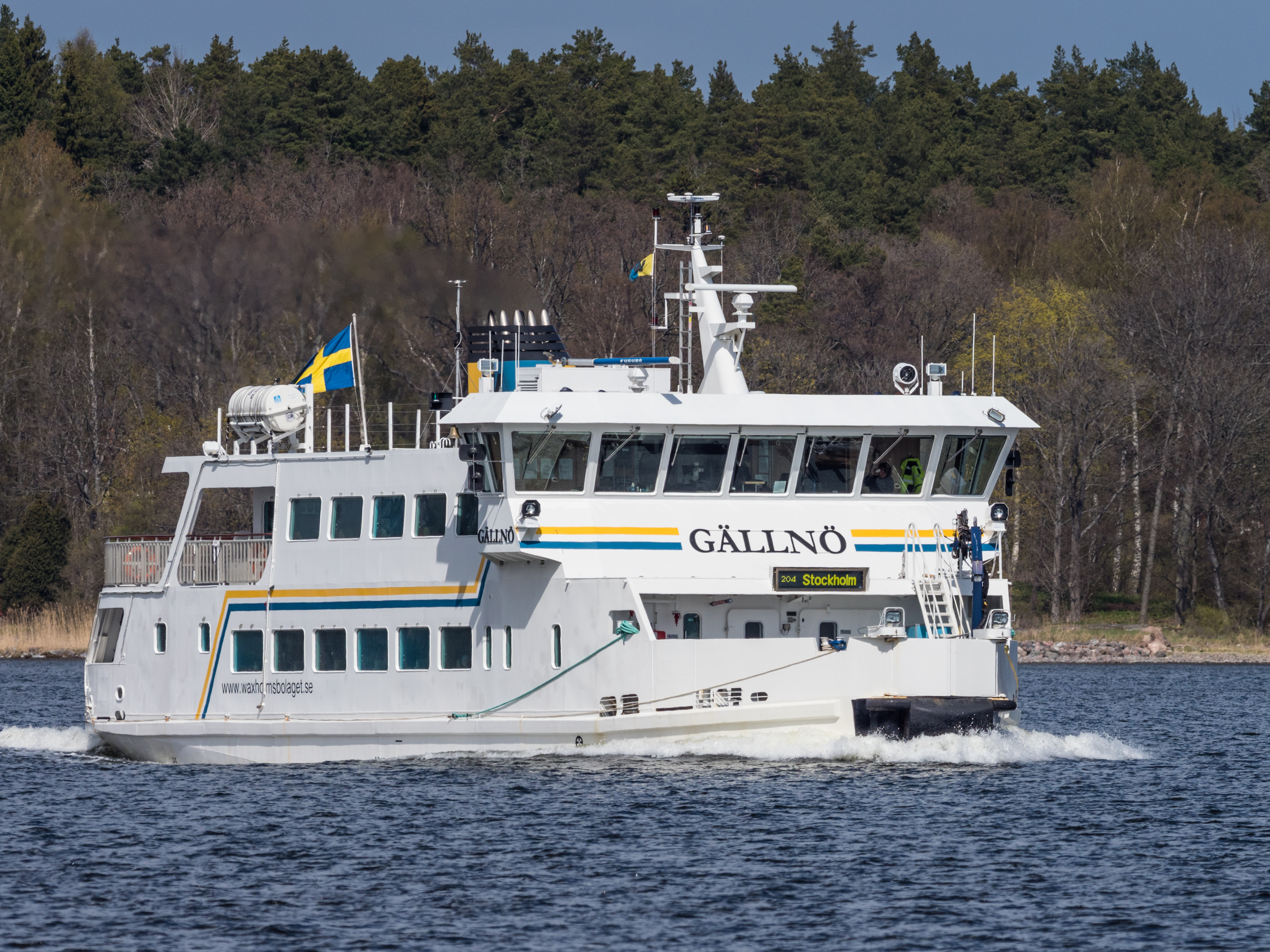
The Stockholm archipelago ferry Gällnö

=== Naval ===
- Finnish Navy: Finnish pollution control vessel Louhi
- Finnish Navy: Fabian Wrede-class training ship
- UK Border Force: HMC Protector
- Estonian Navy: Offshore Oil Collecting Patrol Vessel Kindral Kurvits
- SYKE/ Finnish Navy: Finnish Navy oil recovery vessel Hylje refit
- Finnish Navy: Pansio-class minelayer Mid-life Upgrade
- Rajavartiolaitos: Multitask Patrol Boat RV15E

=== Civilian ===
- Waxholmsbolaget: MV Nämdö
- Waxholmsbolaget: MV Gällnö
- Self-propelled road ferry Saturnus
- Cable ferry Embla
- SAR vessel Jenny Wihuri
- Fast SAR vessel Svante G
- Double ended passenger ferry Braheborg
- Västtrafik: Hybrid ready passenger ferries Älveli and Älfrida
- Arctia: Harbour icebreaker Ahto
