= Offshore oil spill prevention and response =

Disaster management study and practice

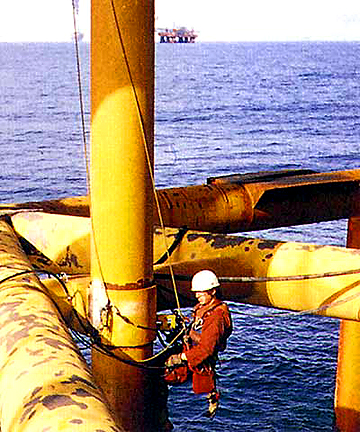
Inspector on offshore oil drilling rig

Offshore oil spill prevention and response is the study and practice of reducing the number of offshore incidents that release oil or hazardous substances into the environment and limiting the amount released during those incidents.

Important aspects of prevention include technological assessment of equipment and procedures and protocols for training, inspection, and contingency plans for the avoidance, control, and shutdown of offshore operations. The response includes a technological assessment of equipment and procedures for cleaning up oil spills,and protocols for the detection, monitoring, containment, and removal of oil spills, and the restoration of affected wildlife and habitat.

In the United States, offshore oil spill prevention contingency plans and emergency response plans are federally mandated requirements for all offshore oil facilities in U.S. Federal waters. Currently administered by the Minerals Management Service (MMS), these regulatory functions were ordered on May 19, 2010 to be transferred to the United States Department of the Interior's newly created Bureau of Safety and Environmental Enforcement. Oil spills in inland waters are the responsibility of the Environmental Protection Agency (EPA), while oil spills in coastal waters and deepwater ports are the responsibility of the U.S. Coast Guard.

Unlike the Best Available Technology (BAT) criteria stipulated by the Clean Air Act and the Clean Water Act, the Outer Continental Shelf Lands Act amendments of 1978 stipulated that offshore drilling and oil spill response practices incorporate the use of Best Available and Safest Technologies (BAST). While the Technology Assessment and Research (TAR) Program is tasked with research and development of such technologies through contract projects, human factors are also highly relevant in preventing oil spills. As William Cook, former chief of the Performance and Safety Branch of Offshore Minerals Management for the MMS, expressed it: "Technology is not enough. Sooner or later, it comes face to face with a human being. What that human being does or does not do, often ensures that the technology works as it was intended—or does not. Technology—in particular—new, innovative, cutting edge technology must be integrated with human and organizational factors (HOF) into a system safety management approach."

== Top 10 largest oil spills in history ==
| Rank | Date | Cause | Source | Location | Spill Volume |
|---|---|---|---|---|---|
| 1. | Jan. 23–27, 1991 | Deliberate act by Iraq | Oil Tankers | 10 miles out of Kuwait | 240–460 million gallons |
| 2. | April 20, 2010 | Explosion | Drilling rig Deepwater Horizon | Gulf of Mexico, 50 miles off the coast of Louisiana | 210 million gallons |
| 3. | June 3, 1979 | Well blowout | Oil well Ixtoc 1 | Gulf of Mexico | 140 million gallons |
| 4. | March 2, 1992 | Leak | Oil well | Fergana Valley, Uzbekistan | 88 million gallons |
| 5. | July 19, 1979 | Collision of tankers | Atlantic Empress and the Aegean Captain | Trinidad & Tobago | 87 million gallons |
| 6. | Sept. 8, 1994 | Dam burst | Oil Reservoir | Russia | 84 million gallons |
| 7. | April, 1977 | Well blowout | Ekofisk oil field | North Sea | 81 million gallons |
| 8. | Feb. 4, 1983 | Collision | Nowruz Field Platform | Persian Gulf, Iran | 80 million gallons |
| 9. | May 28, 1991 | Explosion | Tanker ABT Summer | Offshore of Angola | 78 million gallons |
| 10. | Aug. 6, 1983 | Fire on tanker | Tanker Castillo de Bellver | Cape Town, South Africa | 78 million gallons |

Link

== Regulations and consequences ==
Because of treatment and disposal requirements for drilling and production, wastes are likely to become ever more stringent. Bans on land disposal will pose even greater challenges, especially for remote oil and gas operations. The significant costs to oil and gas producers complying with this new wave of regulation will be outweighed only by the even more significant costs of non-compliance. The federal Environmental Protection Agency (EPA) in the United States and similar bodies globally as well as many state and local agencies have greatly increased both their enforcement capabilities and activities. Most environmental laws carry criminal charges. Because of this many operations personnel and members of senior management of large companies have found themselves on the wrong side of environmental enforcement actions through ignorance to the increasingly complex requirements and the severe consequences of violating environmental laws.

International treaties, like the International Convention for the Prevention of Pollution from Ships (MARPOL), administered by the International Maritime Organization and implemented in many countries as legislation (such as the US Oil Pollution Act of 1973) place mandatory restrictions, recording, and penalties for the spilling of oil from ships.

In 1967, the Torrey canyon incident off the coast of Britain leaked massive amounts of oil into the ocean. One of the many issues this incident highlighted was the issue of economic compensation, as the existing laws did not allow the British and French government to sue the responsible corporation for adequate compensation. Today, there are several regulations, such as the clean water act, and International Convention on Civil Liability for Oil Pollution Damage (CLC) that provide a framework for how to deal with the issue of compensation. The regulations aim to identify who is the responsible party, what are damages they must compensate for, and which parties should receive compensation. There are also non-government organizations that deal with oil spill compensation claims, like the international tanker owners pollution federation Limited (ITOPF), a non-profit organization. Though international regulations, like CLC exists and are widely adopted, they do not apply everywhere. The U.S for example, have contributed to the creation of the CLC, but is not a signatory of the CLC because they have extensive national regulations, like the clean water act and oil pollution act that they rely on instead, while China only has implemented parts of it.

== Technologies ==
Hydrocarbon producing wells are designed and managed on the basis of the 'barriers' in place to maintain containment. A 'dual barrier' philosophy is typically used whereby two independently verified barriers to the hydrocarbon reservoir and the environment are required at all times. The failure of a single barrier would not lead to a hydrocarbon release. During the different phases of drilling, production, workover and abandonments, many different pieces of equipment will be used to maintain control of the well fluids and pressures.

=== Drilling blowout preventers ===
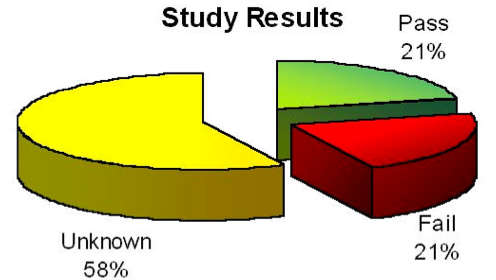
Figure 1. Of the shear rams tested, 50% failed under pressures expected in deep sea drilling.

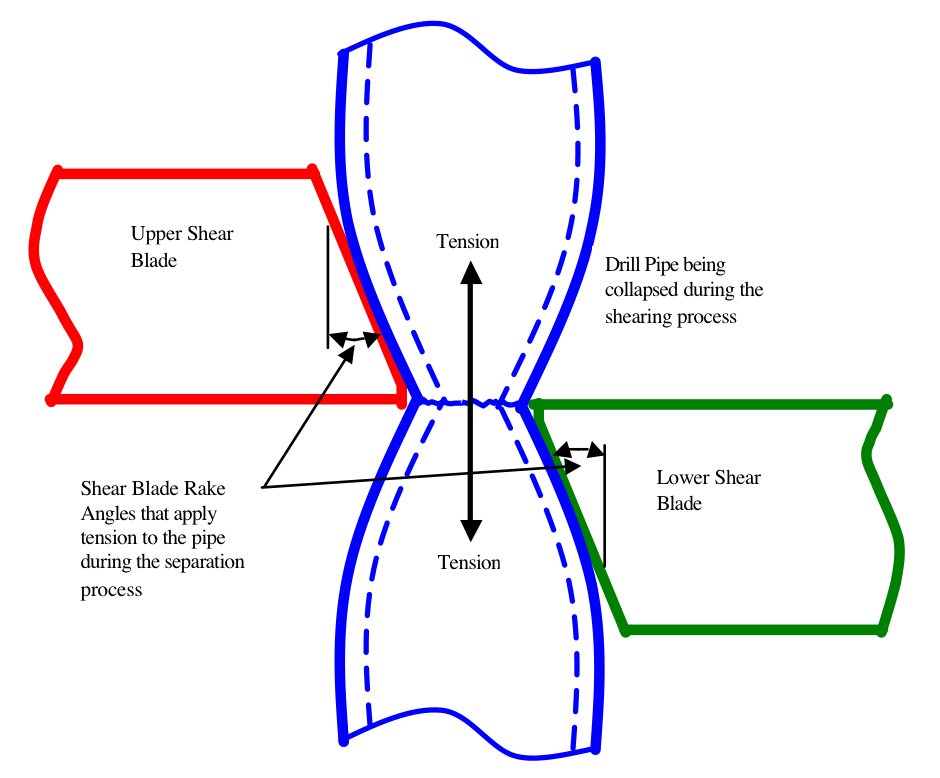
Figure 2. In a shear ram, the two blades are driven hydraulically to cut the thick steel drill pipe.

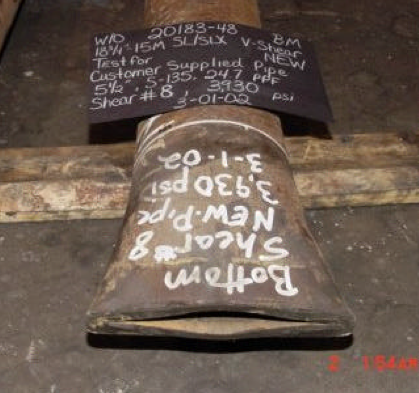
Figure 3. Sheared end of a drill pipe.

The primary safety control devices for well drilling are blowout preventers (BOPs), which have been used for nearly a century in control of oil well drilling on land. The BOP equipment technology has been adapted and used in offshore wells since the 1960s. The inspection and repair of subsea BOPs are much more costly, and the consequences of failure potentially much worse. There are two variations of offshore BOP in use; the sub-sea blowout preventer which sits on the ocean floor, and the surface blowout preventer which sits between the riser pipe and the drilling platform. The surface unit is smaller, lighter, less costly, and more easily accessed for routine tests and maintenance. However, it does not prevent blowouts involving a broken riser pipe.

Blowout Preventers often contain a stack of independently-operated cutoff mechanisms, so there is redundancy in case of failure, and the ability to work in all normal circumstances with the drill pipe in or out of the well bore. The BOP used in the Deepwater Horizon, for example, had five "rams" and two "annular" blowout preventers. The rams were of two types: "pipe rams" and "shear rams". If the drill pipe is in the well, the pipe rams slide perpendicular to the pipe, closing around it to form a tight seal. The annular preventers also close around the pipe, but have more of a vertical motion, so they loosen slightly if the drill pipe is being pushed downward, as might be necessary in a "snubbing" or "well kill" operation. Shear rams may be used as a last resort to cut through the drill pipe and shut off everything, including whatever might be coming up inside the drill pipe.

Studies done for the Minerals Management Service have questioned the reliability of shear rams in deep-water drilling. Figure 1 shows the result of a 2002 study on offshore oil rigs. This study was designed to answer the question "Can a given rig's BOP equipment shear the pipe to be used in a given drilling program at the most demanding condition to be expected?" Seven of the fourteen cases in this study opted not to test, another had insufficient data to draw a definitive conclusion, and three failed to shear the pipe under realistic conditions of expected well bore and seawater pressure. In each case of failure, increasing the pressure on the rams above its design value, successfully sheared the pipe. A follow-up study in 2004 confirmed these results with a much larger sample of drill pipes and typical blowout preventers from three different manufacturers.

In addition to insufficient ram pressure, a New York Times investigation of the Deepwater Horizon oil spill listed other problem areas for deepwater blowout preventers. If one of the threaded joints between pipe sections is positioned within a shear ram, the ram would probably not cut through it, because the joints are "nearly indestructible". Requiring two shear rams in every blowout preventer may help to avoid this problem and to avoid some types of "single-point failure". Other technologies that might improve the reliability of BOPs include backup systems for sending commands to the BOP and more powerful submersibles that connect to the BOP's hydraulics system.

=== Well casings ===
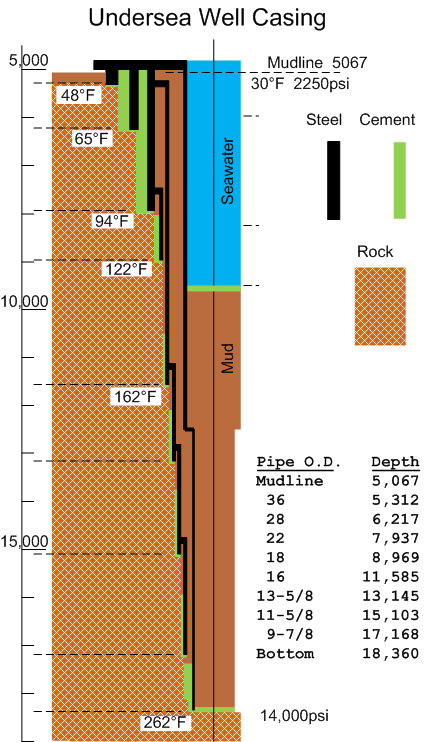
Figure 4. Typical well casings during the final tests before shut in.

Casing of offshore oil wells is done with a set of nested steel pipes, cemented to the rock walls of the borehole as in Figure 4. Each section is suspended by a threaded adapter inside the bottom end of the section above. Failure of either the casings or the cement can lead to injection of oil into groundwater layers, flow to the surface far from the well, or a blowout at the wellhead.

In addition to casings, oil wells usually contain a "production liner" or "production tubing", which is another set of steel pipes suspended inside the casing. The "annulus" between the casing and the production liner is filled with "mud" of a specific density to "balance" the pressure inside the casing with the "pore pressure" of fluids in the surrounding rock "formations".

To ensure that the cement forms a strong, continuous, 360-degree seal between the casing and the borehole, "centralizers" are placed around the casing sections before they are lowered into the borehole. Cement is then injected in the space between the bottom of the new casing section and the bottom of the borehole. The cement flows up around the outside of the casing, replacing the mud in that space with pure, uncontaminated cement. Then the cement is held perfectly still for several hours while it solidifies.

Without centralizers, there is a high risk that a channel of drilling mud or contaminated cement will be left where the casing contacts the borehole. These channels can provide a path for a later blowout. Even a thin crack can be pushed open by the enormous pressure of oil from below. Then erosion of the cement can occur from high-velocity sand particles in the oil. A hairline crack can thus become a wide-open gushing channel.

Another cause of cement failure is not waiting long enough for the cement to solidify. This can be the result of a rushed drilling schedule, or it could happen if there is a leak causing the cement to creep during the time it is supposed to be setting. A "cement evaluation log" can be run after each cement job to provide a detailed, 360-degree check of the integrity of the entire seal. Sometimes these logs are skipped due to schedule pressures.

Cement is also used to form permanent barriers in the annulus outside the production liner, and temporary barriers inside the liner. The temporary barriers are used to "shut in" the well after drilling and before the start of production. Figure 4 shows a barrier being tested by replacing the heavy mud above it with lighter seawater. If the cement plug is able to contain the pressure from the mud below, there will be no upward flow of seawater, and it can be replaced with mud for the final shut in.

There are no cement barriers in the annulus in Figure 4. While there is no requirement for such barriers, adding them can minimize the risk of a blowout through a direct wide-open channel from the reservoir to the surface.

== See also ==
- Automated Data Inquiry for Oil Spills
