= Finnish Environment Institute =

- Suomen ympäristökeskus

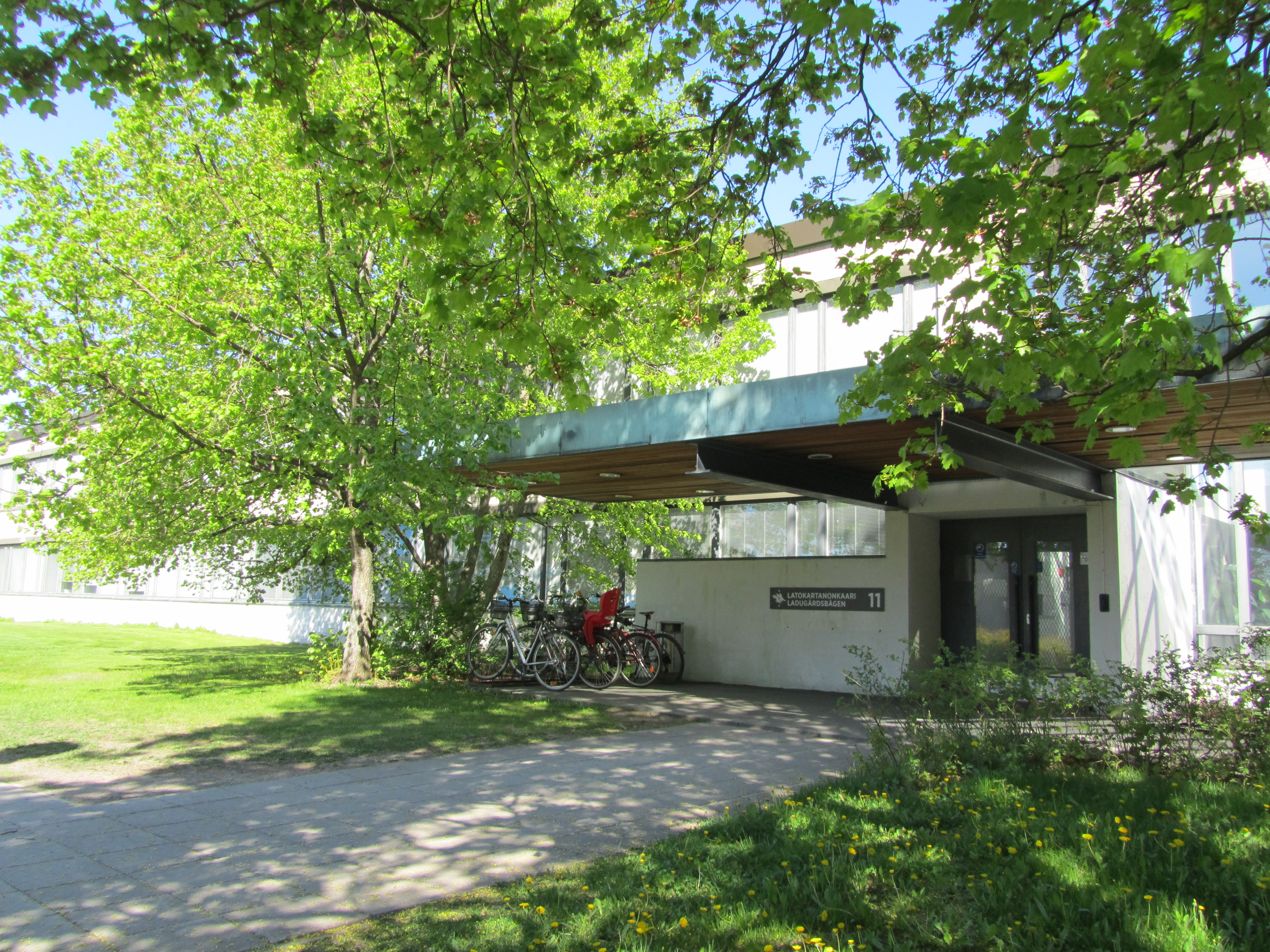

Agency overview
- Formed: 1995
- Preceding agency: Vesi- ja ympäristöhallitus
- Jurisdiction: Government of Finland
- Headquarters: Viikki, Helsinki
- Employees: 700
- Agency executive: Leif Schulman, Director General
- Parent department: Ministry of the Environment
- Website: www.syke.fi/en-US

The Finnish Environment Institute (SYKE) (Finnish: Suomen ympäristökeskus, Swedish: Finlands miljöcentral) is a multidisciplinary research and expert institute under the Ministry of the Environment, Finland. SYKE has four office and research facilities in Helsinki, Oulu, Jyväskylä and Joensuu.
