= Finnish pollution control vessel Hylje =

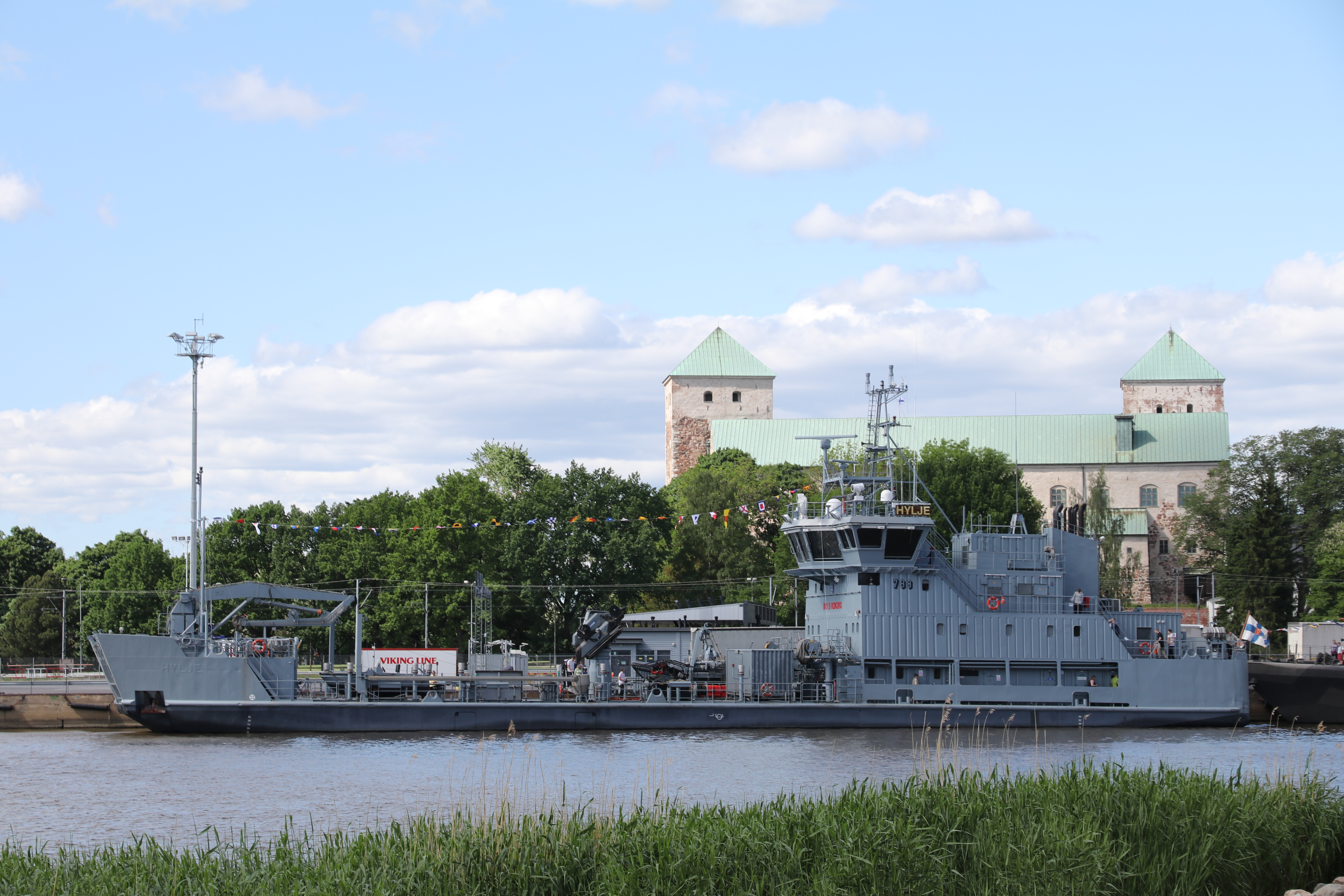
- Hylje in Turku

History

Finland
- Name: Hylje
- Operator: Finnish Ministry of the Environment
- Builder: Oy Laivateollisuus Ab, Turku
- Launched: 1981
- Refit: 1990-1991
- Identification: IMO number: 8006804; Call sign: OIMG; MMSI number: 230353000
- Status: In service

General characteristics
- Type: Oil spill response vessel
- Tonnage: 726 GT; 984 DWT
- Displacement: 1,400 tonnes
- Length: 54 m (177 ft 2 in)
- Beam: 12.5 m (41 ft 0 in)
- Draught: 3 m (9 ft 10 in)
- Ice class: 1A
- Propulsion: 2 × 753 kW (1,010 hp)
- Speed: 11 knots (20 km/h; 13 mph)
- Complement: 18

Hylje (799) is a combined pollution cleanup ship and vehicle transport ship built in 1981 and refitted in 1990–1991. She is operated by a civilian crew from the Ministry of the Environment, but is under Finnish Navy control. The vessel can act as a landing ship and logistic support vessel. The vessel has a capacity to carry 100 tons of deck cargo and its bow ramp can unload vehicles up to 42 tons. The vessel is equipped with oil and oil-slurry collection tanks with a total capacity of 1,410 cubic metres (50,000 cu ft). The vessel can be operated in light ice. Hylje is equipped with a 6-ton crane.
