= Nyland Brigade =

Finnish military unit

Coordinates: 59.9861°N 23.4921°E

- Uudenmaan prikaati Nylands brigad
- Insignia of the Nyland Brigade
- Active: 1918: 3. jääkärirykmentti (3rd Jaeger Regiment); 1918: Jääkärirykmentti 3 (Jaeger Regiment 3); 1918-1919: Savon jääkärirykmentti n:o 3 (Savonia Jaeger Regiment No. 3); 1919-1940: Uudenmaan rykmentti (Uusimaa Regiment); 1940–1941: 13. prikaati (13th Brigade); 1941–1944: Jalkaväkirykmentti 13 (Infantry Regiment 13); 1944–1953: Jalkaväkirykmentti 4 (Infantry Regiment 4); 1954–1956: 4. prikaati (4th Brigade); 1957–: Nylands brigad (Nyland Brigade)
- Country: Finland
- Branch: Finnish Navy
- Type: Naval infantry
- Size: Wartime size unknown Approximately 1,500 soldiers trained each year
- Part of: Finnish Navy
- Garrison/HQ: Dragsvik, Raseborg, Finland
- Mottos: Militärt kunnande, sammanhållning, framåtanda (roughly: Know-how, cohesion, drive)
- Colors: Blue and yellow
- March: Nylänningarnas marsch
- Anniversaries: 18 April (Battle of Siikajoki); 5 July (Battle of Teikari); 9 July (Navy Day)
- Equipment: Jehu, Jurmo, Uisko, 'G' class, XA-185 Pasi, Spike-ER
- Engagements: Battle of Siikajoki
- Decorations: Siikajoki Cross

Commanders
- Commodore: Mikko Laakkonen

Insignia
- Headdress: Green beret with Sea Eagle's Head badge (qualified Coastal Jaegers); Black navy beret with Anchor&Lion badge (other troops)
- Insignia of the Vasa Coastal Jaeger Battalion

- Insignia of the Ekenäs Coastal Battalion

- Flag

The Nyland Brigade (Swedish: Nylands brigad, NylBr, Finnish: Uudenmaan prikaati, UudPr) is a brigade-level unit in the Finnish Navy. It is responsible for amphibious warfare, naval reconnaissance and special operations of the Finnish Navy. It is one of the three main units of the Navy, alongside the Coastal Fleet and Coastal Brigade. It is stationed in Dragsvik in Raseborg in the province of Uusimaa. The coastal jaegers form a part of it. It is the only unit of the Finnish Defence Forces where the instruction language is Swedish, one of the country's national languages alongside Finnish. The command language is, however, Finnish.

The brigade also trains high-readiness coastal jaegers who serve in the brigade's High Readiness Unit (VYKS ATU). The unit is trained for demanding military operations along the coast and in the archipelago. The service period in the High Readiness Unit is 347 days, regardless of role, and soldiers are selected for training after basic training based on specific requirements. The unit is assigned to the 1st Coastal Jaeger Company.

== Organization ==
- Headquarters
- Vasa Coastal Jaeger Battalion
  - 1st Coastal Jaeger Company
  - 2nd Coastal Jaeger Company
  - Combat Boat Company
- Ekenäs Coastal Battalion
  - Mortar Company
  - Headquarters and Signal Company
  - Combat Engineer Company
- Logistics Center

The Vasa Coastal Jaeger Battalion trains coastal jaegers, boatsmen, coastal missile troops and reconnaissance troops. The Ekenäs Coastal Battalion trains mortar and signal troops, military policemen, chauffeurs, supply specialists and combat engineers.

== History ==
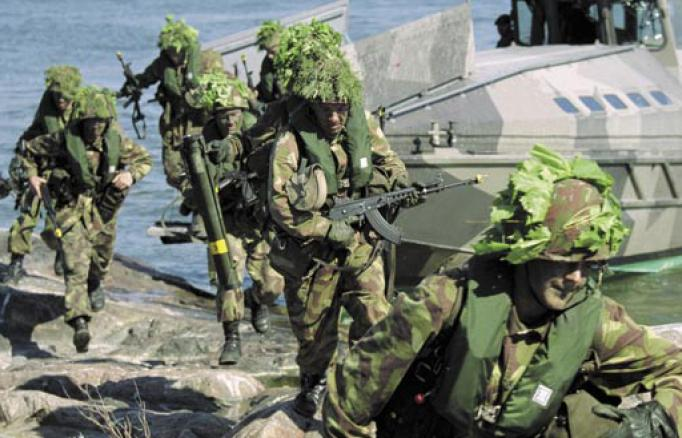
The Finnish coastal jaegers are trained in Nyland Brigade

The brigade follows the traditions of the Nyland and Tavastehus Cavalry Regiment, which Gustavus Adolphus established in 1626. The regiment distinguished itself in the Battle of Siikajoki during the Finnish War. The brigade also traces back its history to the 3rd Jaeger Regiment during the Finnish Civil War, renamed Uusimaa Regiment during the interwar period. After the Winter War, the Uusimaa Regiment was one of the units forming the new 13th Brigade, which formed the basis of the 13th Infantry Regiment (JR13) during the Continuation War, later called the 4th Infantry Regiment, which was restructured to form the 4th Brigade and renamed to Nyland Brigade in 1957. The unit became a part of the Finnish Navy in 1998, having been an Army unit until then.

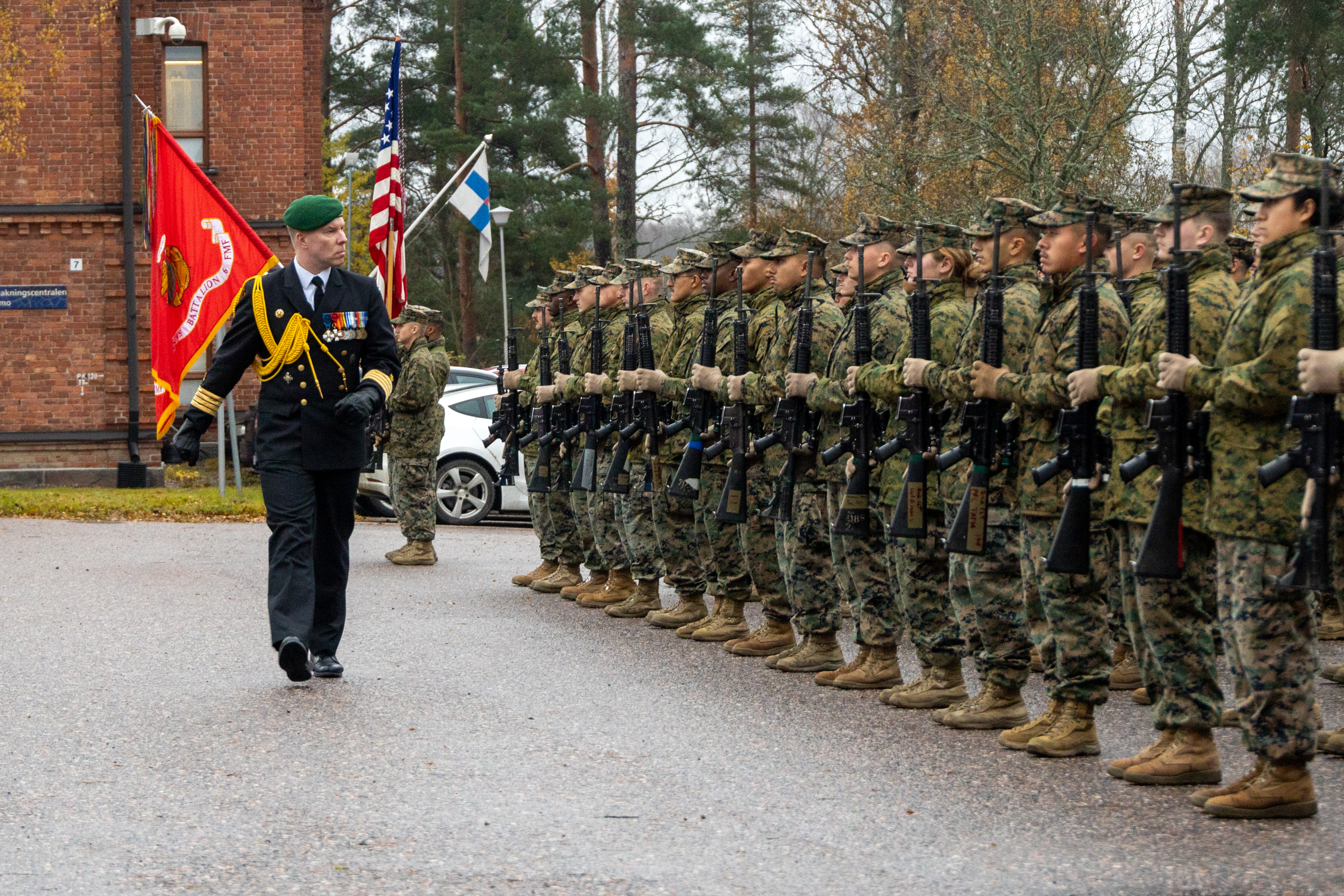
Nylands Brigade Kommendör Jyri Kopare inspects U.S. Marines assigned to Combat Logistics Battalion 6, Combat Logistics Regiment 2, 2nd Marine Logistics Group, in part of the Swedish Heritage Parade in Dragsvik, Finland on November 5, 2023

Since 2022, U.S Marines have been training in the garrison of Nylands Brigade, and the military presence in the area has intensified further after the DCA agreement entered into force in 2024.

== Equipment ==
The brigade utilizes XA-185 Pasi APCs and trucks for land transport, and Jehu, Jurmo, Uisko and G class landing craft for amphibious transport. The motorized artillery previously used 130 K 54 guns, but now relies on Spike-ER missiles for anti-ship warfare.

== Sources ==
=== Publications ===
- Fanbäraren, magazine, 1935-
