= Watercat M14-class landing craft =

Military transport

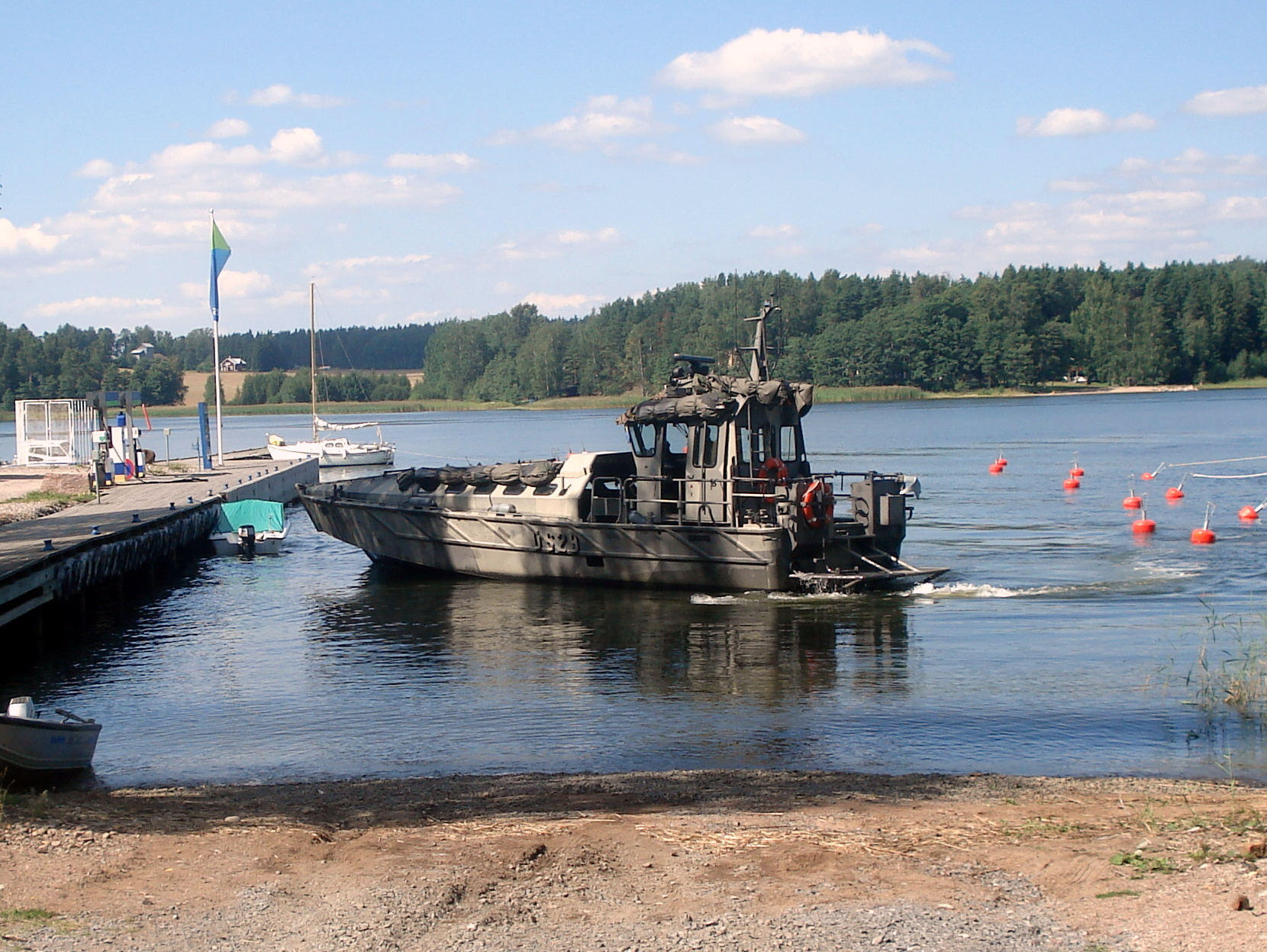
- Jurmo class landing craft at Mathildedal

Class overview
- Name: Watercat M14
- Builders: Marine Alutech
- Operators: Royal Malaysia Police
- Preceded by: Jurmo class landing craft
- Succeeded by: Watercat M16

General characteristics
- Type: landing craft, personnel
- Displacement: 17 tons
- Length: 15.4 m
- Beam: 4,00 m
- Draught: less than 1 m
- Installed power: 2 x 525kW
- Propulsion: Two Diesel 525 kW combined with waterjets
- Speed: 43 knots; 35 knots (full load)
- Range: 250 nm
- Troops: 16
- Crew: 4
- Armament: 1× 12.7 mm NSV machine gun or; 1× 40 mm grenade machine gun
- Armour: Kevlar lining

The Watercat M14 landing craft is a Jurmo-class type of military transport in use by the Royal Malaysia Police. The manufacturer is Marine Alutech Oy Ab, Finland. It is related to the Watercat M12 of the Finnish Navy.

== History ==
The Jurmo was the result of modernisation in the Finnish Navy in the late 1990s. It was designed to replace the existing Uisko class landing craft. Its main purpose is landing and transportation operations for the Finnish Coastal Jaegers in all weather conditions. It has good maneuverability and can come to a full stop in only one ship length from top speed. Low draft makes it suitable for amphibious assault even in shallow waters.

The Watercat M14 can transport 5 tons of cargo or 16 men.

== Operators ==
Malaysia
Royal Malaysia Police: 10 vessels of the Watercat M14 version.

== Related development ==
- G class landing craft
- Uisko class landing craft
- Jurmo class landing craft
