= Finnish Coastal Jaegers =

- Swedish: Kustjägarna; Finnish: Rannikkojääkärit
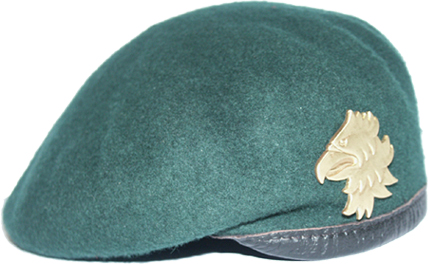
- Green beret with Sea Eagle's Head pin
- Country: Finland
- Branch: Finnish Navy
- Type: Marines
- Size: Battalion
- Part of: Nyland Brigade
- Garrison/HQ: Dragsvik, Raseborg, Finland
- Nickname: Rannarit
- Mottos: Swedish: En gång kustjägare, alltid kustjägare Finnish: Kerran rannikkojääkäri, aina rannikkojääkäri (Once a coastal jaeger, always a coastal jaeger.)

Commanders
- Current commander: Commodore Sami Jaakkola

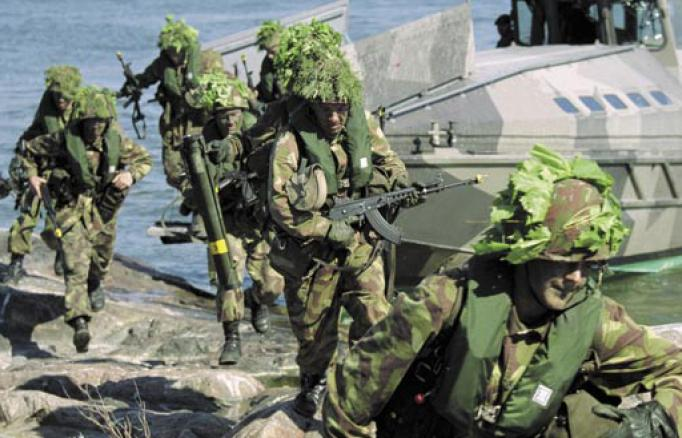
Jaegers during training

The Finnish Coastal Jaegers (Swedish: Kustjägarna, and Finnish: Rannikkojääkärit) are one of the special operations forces unit of the Finnish Navy. The unit consists of both regulars and conscripts, predominantly Finland Swedes, and is a part of Swedish-speaking Nyland Brigade (Nylands brigad/Uudenmaan prikaati) in Dragsvik, near Ekenäs.

== Mission ==
The Finnish Coastal Jaegers primary role is to conduct counterattack against enemy landings in the Finnish archipelago, an environment known for small islands and skerries. Jaegers can function independently or with the support of artillery units, including light or heavy mortars. A number of Coastal Jaeger troops receive training for direct action, irregular warfare, and special reconnaissance behind enemy lines.

== Selection ==
Conscripts are selected for training at 1. & 2. KUSTJK (the Coastal Jaeger companies; Swedish: 1. & 2. Kustjägarkompaniet) in Dragsvik on the basis of the physical review taken by all conscripts before they enter military service. After 6 weeks of basic training, privates are assigned to further training in the same unit if suitable or moved to another unit for other type of training. The number of jaegers trained varies per intake, but usually about 30-50% of the conscripts in the two KUSTJKs go on to receive marine training, with approx. 40% of them selected for training as NCOs or officer candidates. The other half of KUSTJK recruits receive training for support roles such as cooks, medics, drivers and boatsmen, for easier combat roles and may even be transferred to other units.

Conscripts are selected for NCO (Stage 1) education after 12 weeks of training. Candidates for officer training are selected during the 6-week-long Stage 1 of NCO training. About 10–20% of Stage 1 NCO candidates are sent to the Reserve Officer's School for the 16-week-long course and become officer candidates upon return to Dragsvik.

== Training ==
The main elements of Jaeger training are combat training, weapon handling, endurance and mobility. For privates the training is 22 weeks and encompasses the fundamental elements of amphibious warfare, commando style raids, maritime operations, and urban warfare and individual military operational specialty. NCO and officer training lasts for 46 weeks, incorporating specialised Military Operations on Urbanized Terrain (MOUT) training. A Jaeger candidate is more likely to spend time marching with a heavy rucksack than doing push-ups. Marches are usually carried out with "full field equipment" (meaning 40–50 kg [88–110 lb]) and can be as long as 80–90 km (50–56 mi). Coastal Jaegers can go with as little as 1–3 hours of sleep during a 4-day exercise.

The difference in length, quality, and intensity of training is reflected in the composition of units used for international duties. These usually consist almost exclusively of NCOs and officers.

== The Green Beret ==
Coastal Jaegers obtain the right to wear the unit's green beret (jaeger green beret with a golden sea eagle) by reaching the required standards in shooting, running, swimming, strength, completing all major exercises and completing the beret march. The beret march is approximately 60–70 km (37–43 mi) in length, over which the Jaeger candidates must navigate by foot, carrying 40–45 kg (88–99 lb) of equipment. Every 5–10 km (3.1–6.2 mi) the candidates stop to complete tasks, such as medical evacuation of "wounded" soldiers, shooting, weapons handling, water crossing and map reading. At one point, candidates are put on a boat and driven to an unknown location. They must locate themselves on a map and find their way back to the route. The march has to be completed in a certain time limit to pass the beret march requirement for the green beret. The dropout rate for the march in 2018 was 40%.

== History ==
The Finnish marine units which preceded the commandos fought against Soviet army troops and Soviet naval infantry during the Winter War (1939–1940) and Continuation War (1941–1944). On 7 September 2019, the unit celebrated its 40th anniversary. The celebrations were attended by 635 out of the 1,041 Coastal Jaegers trained during this period.

== See also ==
- Kustjägarna, similar Swedish unit
- Kystjegerkommandoen, similar Norwegian unit
- Frømandskorpset, similar Danish unit
