= Ajonpää-class minesweeper =

Class overview
- Name: Ajonpää
- Builders: Denmark
- Operators: Finnish Navy
- Built: 1941-1942
- In commission: 1941-1962
- Completed: 2
- Retired: 2

General characteristics
- Type: Minesweeper
- Displacement: 52 tons
- Length: 20.0 m (65.6 ft)
- Beam: 5.3 m (17 ft)
- Draught: 1.7 m (5 ft 7 in)
- Propulsion: 200 hp (150 kW)
- Speed: 10 knots (19 km/h)
- Armament: 1 × 20 mm Madsen AA
- Notes: Ships in class include: Ajonpää, Kallanpää

Ajonpää and Kallanpää were bought from Denmark during the Continuation War and were intended for clearing influence mines. Both ships survived the wars, Ajonpää was retired 1960 and Kallanpää on 1962.
