= Marinen =

Marinen is a Norwegian and Swedish language word meaning "The Navy". It may refer to:

- The Finnish Navy
- The Royal Norwegian Navy
- The Swedish Navy
