= German submarine U-370 =

German World War II submarine

History

Nazi Germany
- Name: U-370
- Ordered: 20 August 1941
- Builder: Flensburger Schiffbau-Gesellschaft, Flensburg
- Yard number: 493
- Laid down: 21 November 1942
- Launched: 24 September 1943
- Commissioned: 19 November 1943
- Fate: Scuttled in northern Germany on 5 May 1945

General characteristics
- Class & type: Type VIIC submarine
- Displacement: 769 tonnes (757 long tons) surfaced; 871 t (857 long tons) submerged
- Length: 67.23 m (220 ft 7 in) o/a; 50.50 m (165 ft 8 in) pressure hull
- Beam: 6.20 m (20 ft 4 in) o/a; 4.70 m (15 ft 5 in) pressure hull
- Height: 9.60 m (31 ft 6 in)
- Draught: 4.74 m (15 ft 7 in)
- Installed power: 2,800–3,200 PS (2,100–2,400 kW; 2,800–3,200 bhp) (diesels); 750 PS (550 kW; 740 shp) (electric)
- Propulsion: 2 shafts; 2 × diesel engines; 2 × electric motors
- Speed: 17.7 knots (32.8 km/h; 20.4 mph) surfaced; 7.6 knots (14.1 km/h; 8.7 mph) submerged
- Range: 8,500 nmi (15,700 km; 9,800 mi) at 10 knots (19 km/h; 12 mph) surfaced; 80 nmi (150 km; 92 mi) at 4 knots (7.4 km/h; 4.6 mph) submerged
- Test depth: 230 m (750 ft); Crush depth: 250–295 m (820–968 ft)
- Complement: 4 officers, 40–56 enlisted
- Armament: 5 × 53.3 cm (21 in) torpedo tubes (four bow, one stern); 14 × torpedoes; 1 × 8.8 cm (3.46 in) deck gun (220 rounds); 2 × 2 cm (0.79 in) C/30 anti-aircraft guns

Service record
- Part of: 4th U-boat Flotilla; 19 November 1943 – 31 July 1944; 8th U-boat Flotilla; 1 August 1944 – 15 February 1945; 4th U-boat Flotilla; 16 February – 5 May 1945
- Identification codes: M 06 266
- Commanders: Oblt.z.S. Karl Nielsen; 19 November 1943 – 5 May 1945
- Operations: 12 patrols: 1st patrol: 9 – 12 July 1944; 2nd patrol: 13 – 14 July 1944; 3rd patrol: 17 – 24 July 1944; 4th patrol: 26 – 27 July 1944; 5th patrol: 28 July – 3 August 1944; 6th patrol: 9 – 12 August 1944; 7th patrol: 20 – 30 August 1944; 8th patrol: 3 – 6 September 1944; 9th patrol: 13 – 28 September 1944; 10th patrol: 2 – 25 October 1944; 11th patrol: 5 January – 5 March 1945; 12th patrol: 7 – 10 March 1945
- Victories: 2 warships sunk (832 tons)

German submarine U-370 was a Type VIIC U-boat of Nazi Germany's Kriegsmarine during World War II.

She carried out twelve patrols before being scuttled in northern Germany on 5 May 1945.

She sank two warships.

== Design ==
German Type VIIC submarines were preceded by the shorter Type VIIB submarines. U-370 had a displacement of 769 tonnes (757 long tons) when at the surface and 871 tonnes (857 long tons) while submerged. She had a total length of 67.10 m (220 ft 2 in), a pressure hull length of 50.50 m (165 ft 8 in), a beam of 6.20 m (20 ft 4 in), a height of 9.60 m (31 ft 6 in), and a draught of 4.74 m (15 ft 7 in). The submarine was powered by two Germaniawerft F46 four-stroke, six-cylinder supercharged diesel engines producing a total of 2,800 to 3,200 metric horsepower (2,060 to 2,350 kW; 2,760 to 3,160 shp) for use while surfaced, two AEG GU 460/8–27 double-acting electric motors producing a total of 750 metric horsepower (550 kW; 740 shp) for use while submerged. She had two shafts and two 1.23 m (4 ft) propellers. The boat was capable of operating at depths of up to 230 metres (750 ft).

The submarine had a maximum surface speed of 17.7 knots (32.8 km/h; 20.4 mph) and a maximum submerged speed of 7.6 knots (14.1 km/h; 8.7 mph). When submerged, the boat could operate for 80 nautical miles (150 km; 92 mi) at 4 knots (7.4 km/h; 4.6 mph); when surfaced, she could travel 8,500 nautical miles (15,700 km; 9,800 mi) at 10 knots (19 km/h; 12 mph). U-370 was fitted with five 53.3 cm (21 in) torpedo tubes (four fitted at the bow and one at the stern), fourteen torpedoes, one 8.8 cm (3.46 in) SK C/35 naval gun, 220 rounds, and two 2 cm (0.79 in) C/30 anti-aircraft guns. The boat had a complement of between forty-four and sixty.

== Service history ==
The submarine was laid down on 21 November 1942 at the Flensburger Schiffbau-Gesellschaft yard at Flensburg as yard number 493, launched on 24 September 1943 and commissioned on 19 November under the command of Oberleutnant zur See Karl Nielsen.

She served with the 4th U-boat Flotilla from 19 November 1943, the 8th flotilla from 1 August 1944 and was back with the 4th flotilla on 16 February 1945.

U-370 spent her entire career in the relatively confined waters of the Baltic Sea and the Gulf of Finland.

=== First to fifth patrols ===
The boat's first patrol was preceded by trips from Kiel to Marviken and then back to Kiel, from where she departed on 9 July 1944. She sailed through the Baltic and into the Gulf of Finland, arriving at Reval, (now Tallinn in Estonia), on 12 July.

She spent the rest of her career in the Ostsee, sinking the Soviet Patrol boat MO-101 in Björkö Sound on 31 July 1944 during her fifth patrol.

=== Sixth to twelfth patrols ===
During her ninth sortie Matrosengefreiter Erwin Stiegeler was swept overboard in the Baltic on 23 September 1944.

It was while on her eleventh foray that she sank the Finnish minelayer Louhi (12 January 1945).

=== Fate ===
U-370 was scuttled in Geltinger Bucht (east of Flensburg) on 5 May 1945. The wreck was broken up in 1948.

== Summary of raiding history ==
Date	Ship Name	Nationality	Tonnage (Note: Merchant ship tonnages are in gross register tons. Military vessels are listed by tons displacement.)	Fate
31 July 1944	Mo-101	Soviet Navy	56	Sunk
12 January 1945	Louhi	Finnish Navy	776	Sunk

== Bibliography ==
- Busch, Rainer; Röll, Hans-Joachim (1999). German U-boat commanders of World War II : a biographical dictionary. Translated by Brooks, Geoffrey. London, Annapolis, Md: Greenhill Books, Naval Institute Press. ISBN 1-55750-186-6.
- Busch, Rainer; Röll, Hans-Joachim (1999). Deutsche U-Boot-Verluste von September 1939 bis Mai 1945 [German U-boat losses from September 1939 to May 1945]. Der U-Boot-Krieg (in German). Vol. IV. Hamburg, Berlin, Bonn: Mittler. ISBN 3-8132-0514-2.
- Gröner, Erich; Jung, Dieter; Maass, Martin (1991). German Warships 1815–1945, U-boats and Mine Warfare Vessels. Vol. 2. Translated by Thomas, Keith; Magowan, Rachel. London: Conway Maritime Press. ISBN 0-85177-593-4.
