= Rautu-class minesweeper =

Finnish navy vessels

Class overview
- Name: Rautu
- Builders: Vilppula: Putilow, St. Petersburg; Rautu: Varkaus
- Operators: Finnish Navy
- Built: 1916-1917
- In commission: 1918-1952
- Completed: 2
- Lost: 1
- Retired: 1

General characteristics
- Type: Minesweeper
- Displacement: 240 tons
- Length: 44.0 m
- Beam: 6.1 m
- Draught: 2.5 m
- Propulsion: 450 hp (340 kW)
- Speed: 10 knots (19 km/h)
- Complement: 32
- Armament: Wartime: 1 × 75 mm gun; 2 × machine gun; Later: 1 × 20 mm Madsen AA
- Notes: Ships in class include: Rautu, Vilppula

Rautu and Vilppula were Kljuz class Minesweepers left by the Soviets to Finland in 1918 since they would not have survived the harsh sailing to the Leningrad. Ships had weak hulls and their engines were not particularly powerful. During peacetime they were used as depot and test ships. Vilppula was designated as T-2 and Zashtshitnik and Rautu as Murman before they were included to the Finnish Navy

In war time the ships were used as minesweepers but occasionally were assigned with more exotic tasks. On 5 December 1941 after Soviets had fled from Hanko there was urgent and pressing need to clear inshore seaways for merchants however the weak hulled minesweepers could not operate in the prevailing conditions. Rautu and Louhi were used as icebreakers breaking clearing the waters for the smaller minesweepers to operate. On 25 July 1944 Vilppula and small Finnish coastal minesweeper Merkurius (former customs boat of ~20 tons in displacement) were attached to a pier near Porkkala when a lone Boston (Douglas A-20 Havoc) type bomber torpedoed both ships. Though the ships were later re-floated they were not deemed to be worth of repairing. Rautu was decommissioned in 1952.
