= G-class landing craft =

Swedish and Finnish vessel

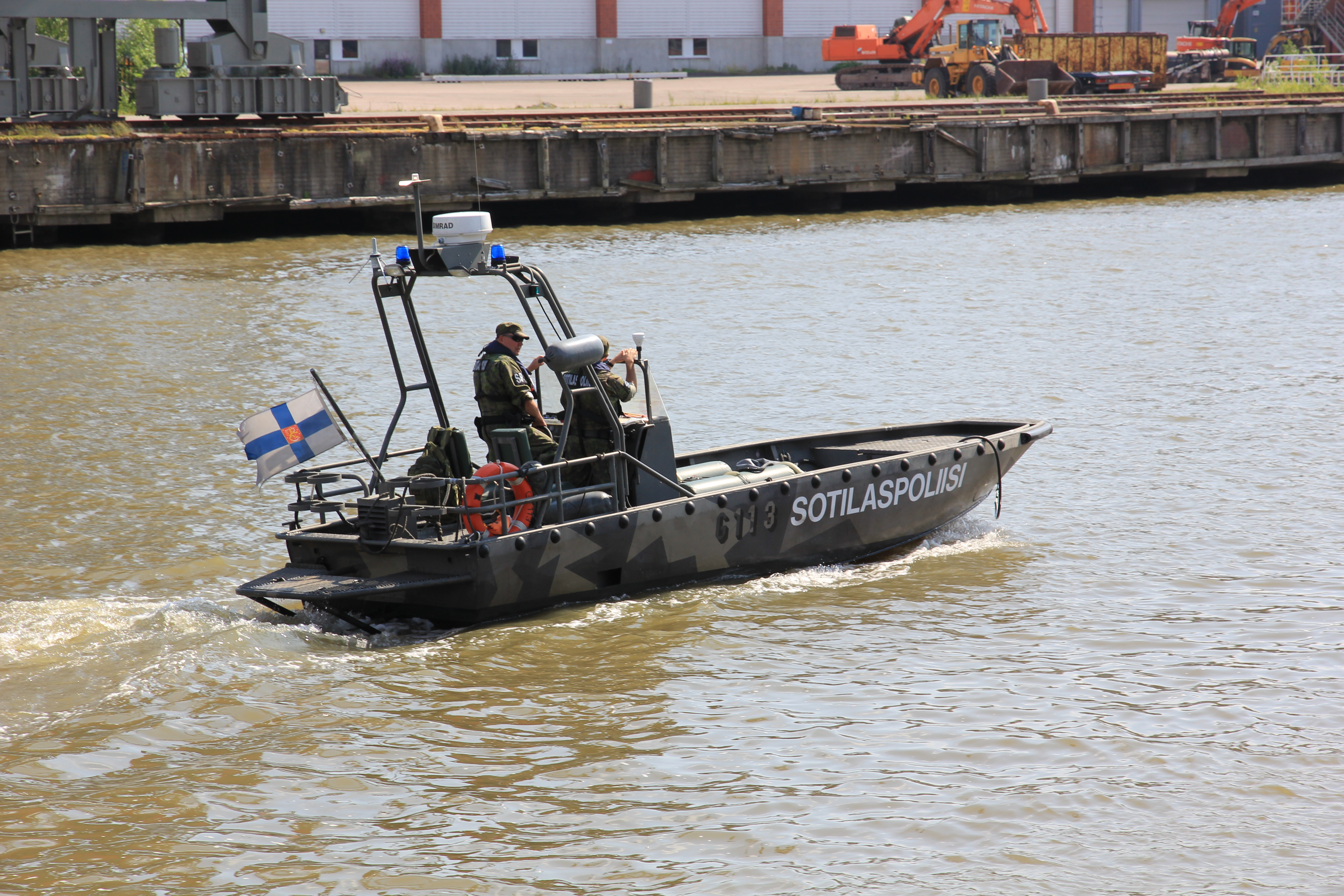
- Finnish military police boat G113 on the river Aurajoki in Turku, Finland during the 2011 Navy Day.

Class overview
- Name: G
- Builders: Marine Alutech
- Succeeded by: Uisko class landing craft

General characteristics
- Type: landing craft, vehicle/personnel
- Displacement: 2.1 tons
- Length: 8.2 m (27 ft)
- Beam: 2.1 m (6 ft 11 in)
- Draught: 0.4
- Propulsion: Yanmar 4LHAM-STP Diesel and Rolls-Royce FF 240 waterjet; 230hp or; Volvo Penta Diesel, TAMD 42 and Rolls-Royce FF 240 waterjet (Sweden)
- Speed: 30+ knots

The G class, or "G-boat" also known as the Marine Alutech Watercat M8 landing craft (Finnish: G-vene, Swedish: Gruppbåt) is a type of vessel in use by the Finnish Navy and the Swedish Navy. The G-boat was originally designed for the Swedish Navy which ordered about 100 of them. It is primarily used for amphibious landings by, and transportation of, marines. It has a very low draught (approximately 20 cm) at high speeds which makes it ideal for amphibious assault even in shallow waters. It has a cargo capacity of 8 men or one metric ton.

== Operators ==
Finland
Finnish Navy: G 98–99, G 101-G 135
Sweden
Swedish Navy 1-100, of which, 20 were donated to Ukraine
Ukraine
Ukrainian Navy: 20 units donated by Sweden delivered in 2024

== See also ==
- Uisko class landing craft
- Jurmo class landing craft
- Jehu-class landing craft
