= Marine Alutech =

Finnish shipbuilding company

Marine Alutech Oy Ab
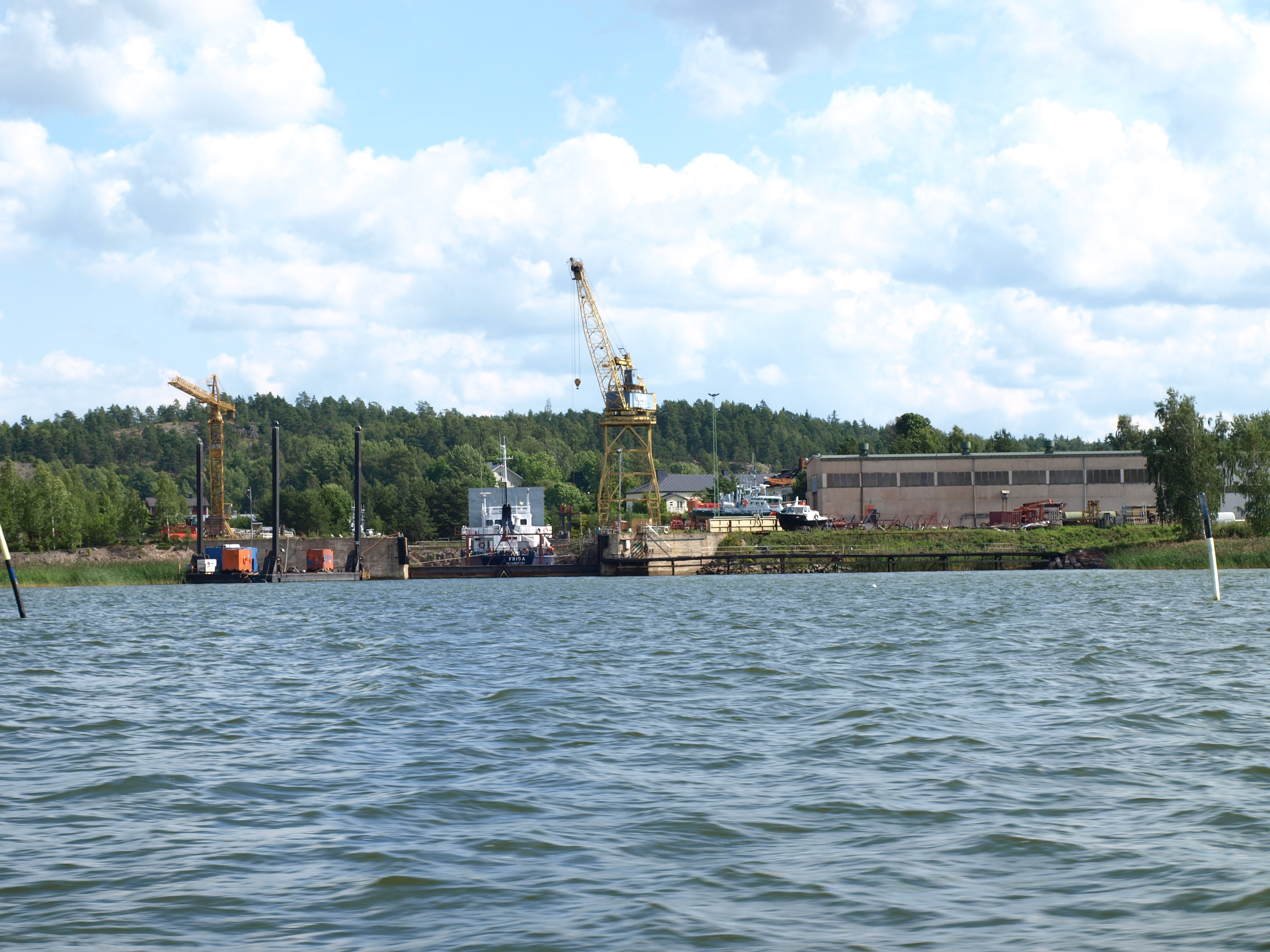
- Marine Alutech shipyard in Teijo
- Type: Osakeyhtiö
- Industry: Shipbuilding
- Founded: 11 September 1991; 34 years ago
- Headquarters: Teijo, Salo, Southwest Finland, Finland
- Area served: Worldwide
- Key people: Niko Haro (CEO)
- Products: Patrol boats, workboats, landing crafts, combat boats
- Number of employees: 70 (2023)
- Website: www.marinealutech.com

Marine Alutech Oy Ab is a leading designer and manufacturer of aluminium and composite boats in Finland. The company specializes in 5–27 meters boats and vessels for navies, coast guards, government agencies and port authorities. Marine Alutech has its own trading name Watercat.

== History ==
Marine Alutech was founded in 1991, although boats had already been manufactured under the Teijo shipyard since 1985. Niko Haro succeeded his father as managing director in 1998, and the company turned toward international markets. During its first 30 years (1991–2021), Marine Alutech delivered 522 boats. Its boats have been sold to several countries.

In late 2025, Marine Alutech and the German company Schiffswerft Gebrüder Friedrich Kiel signed an agreement under which Marine Alutech's boats would begin to be manufactured at the German shipyard in Kiel.

== Products ==
Marine Alutech specializes in fast boats approximately 5–25 metres in length, with hulls made of aluminium and composites. Many of the boats use waterjet propulsion and reach top speeds of over 40 knots (~74 km/h), and even up to 50 knots (~93 km/h). The company's customers are mainly military and government authorities, so the boats can be equipped with many types of systems and weapons, such as machine guns. The boats are outfitted, for example, for patrol, rescue, and combat use.

Among Marine Alutech's best-known products are the Watercat series boats, which include the Finnish Navy's Jurmo-class (Watercat M12) and Jehu-class (Watercat M18) transport and landing craft.

== Military operators ==
=== Finland ===
- G-class landing craft
- Jehu-class landing craft
- Jurmo-class landing craft
- Uisko-class landing craft
- Watercat M14-class landing craft

=== Malaysia ===
- Jurmo-class landing craft
- Watercat M14-class landing craft

=== Sweden ===
- G-class landing craft

=== Swiss Army ===
- Watercat 1250 Patrol: 14 – The model, known as Patr Boot 16, was ordered as the new lake patrol boat to patrol with the bordering countries (Lake Léman, lake Constance, Lake Lugano, Lake Maggiore). It was part of the 2016 armament program. For the production, Marine Alutech collaborated with Shiptec AG in Lucerne. The construction started in 2018 and was completed by 2021.

== Gallery ==
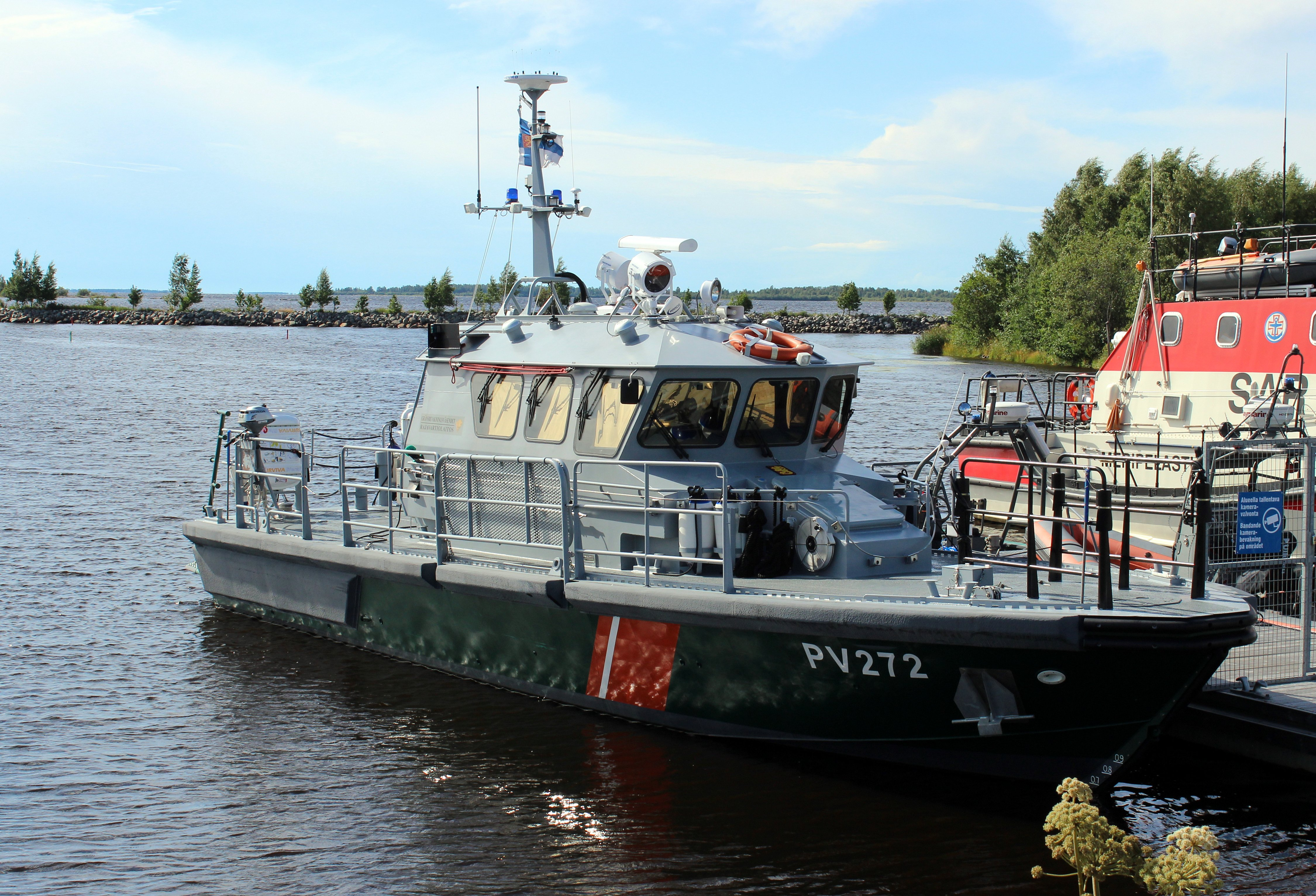
Finnish Border Guard Watercat 1300 Patrol boat PV-272 in Kemi, Finland (2012)

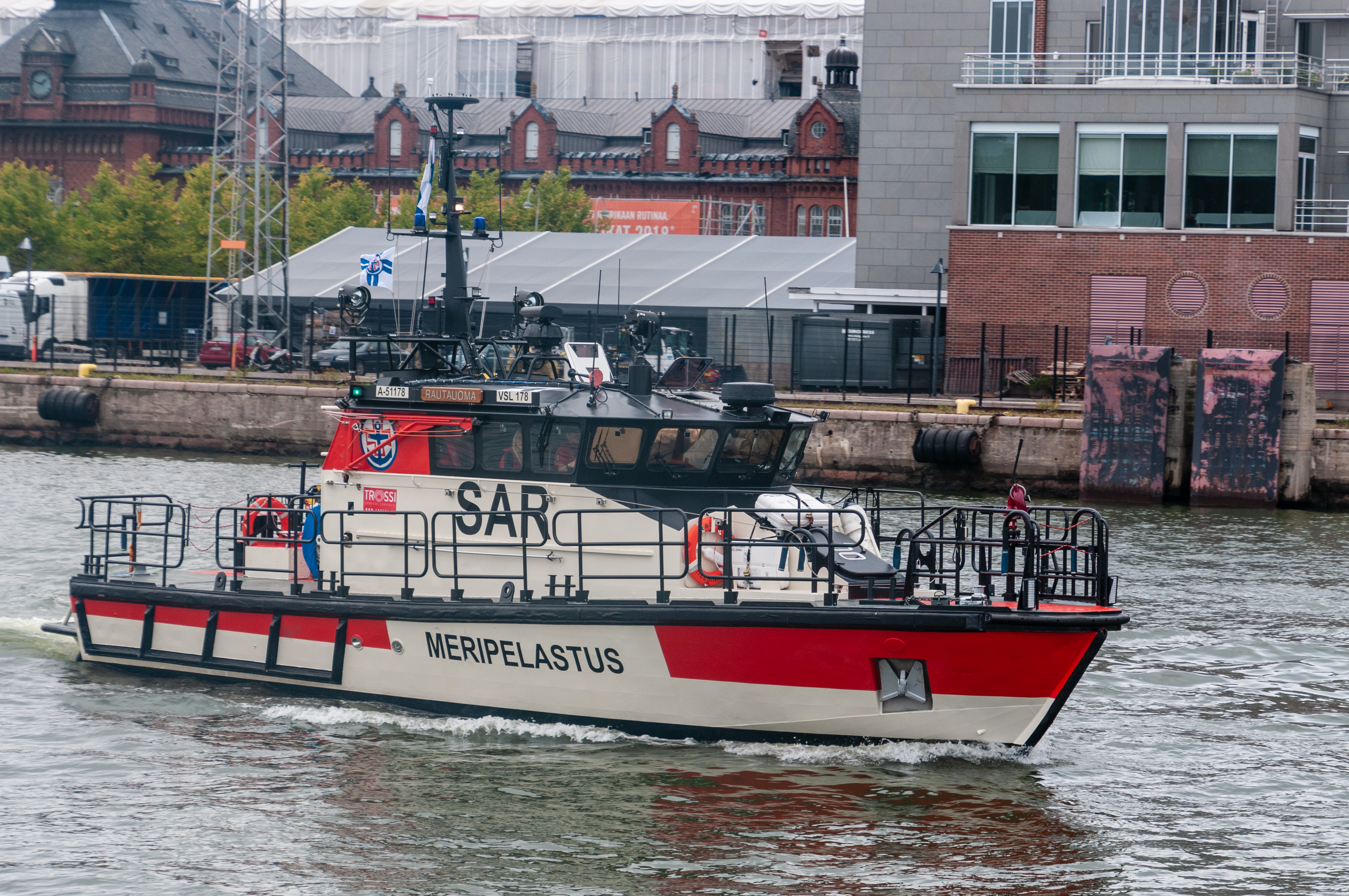
Finnish Lifeboat Institution Watercat 1500 Patrol III rescue boat Rautauoma in Helsinki, Finland (2018)

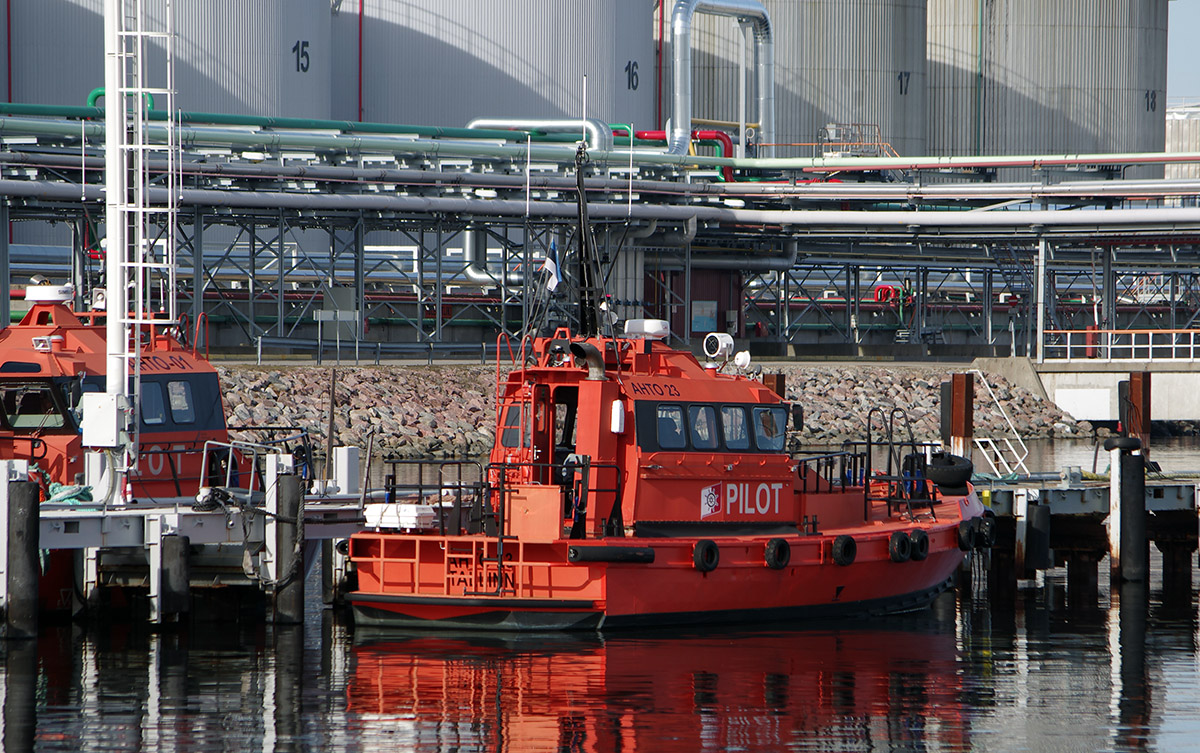
Pilot boat in the Muuga Harbour, Estonia (2014)

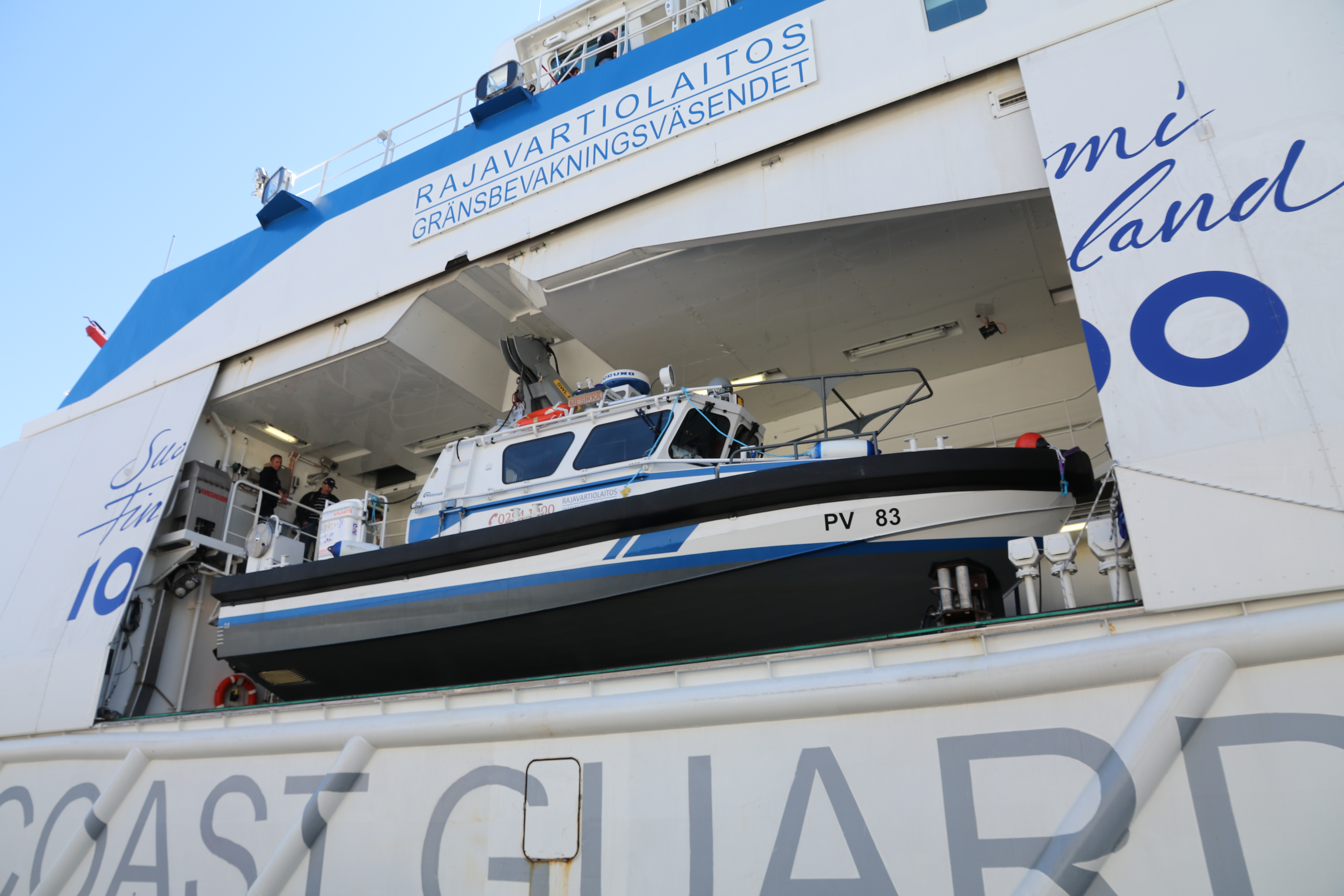
Finnish Border Guard Watercat 1000 Patrol boat PV83 on the offshore patrol craft Turva at South Harbour, Helsinki (2017)

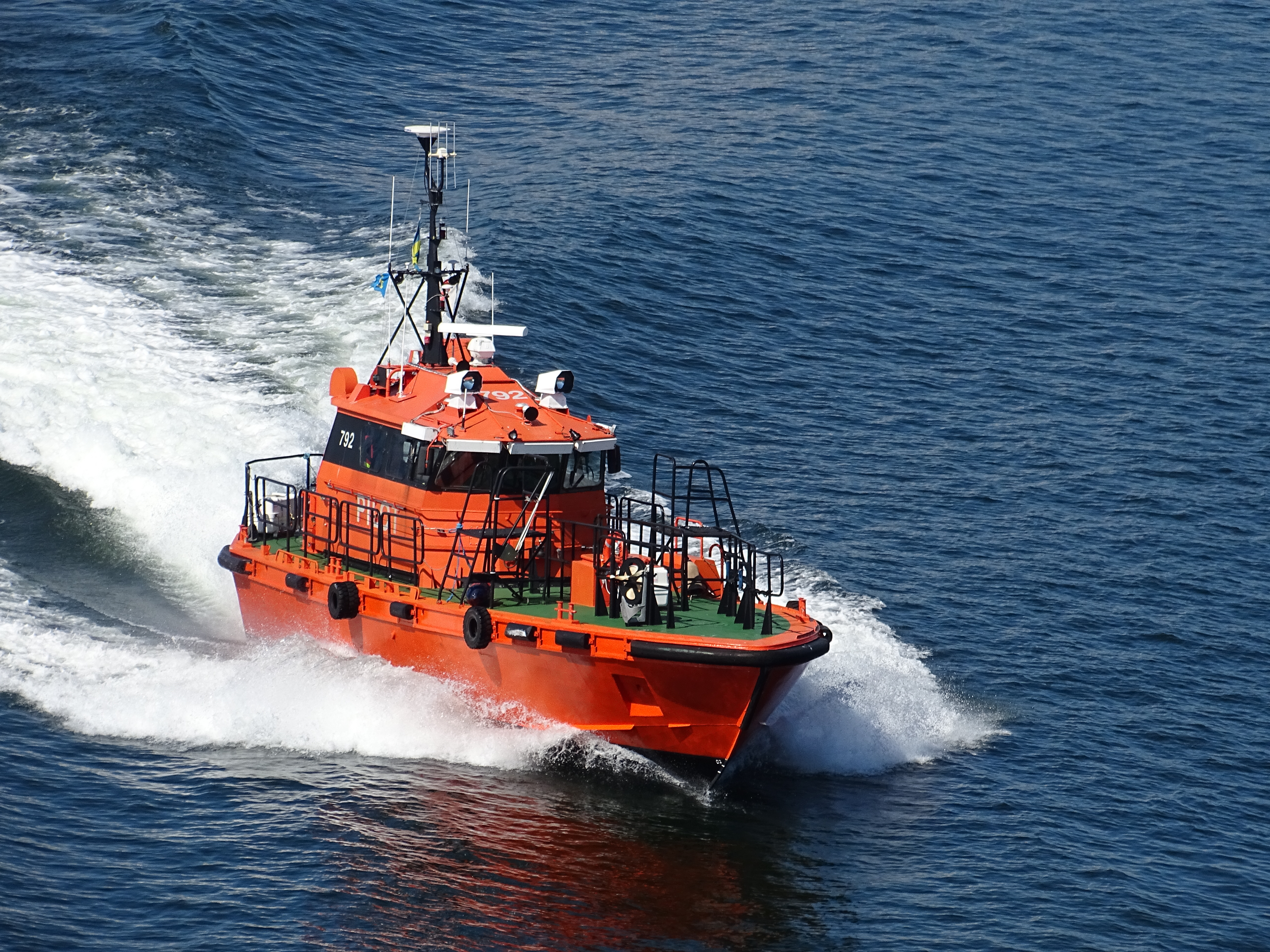
Watercat 1500 Pilot boat in the Stockholm archipelago, Sweden (2018)

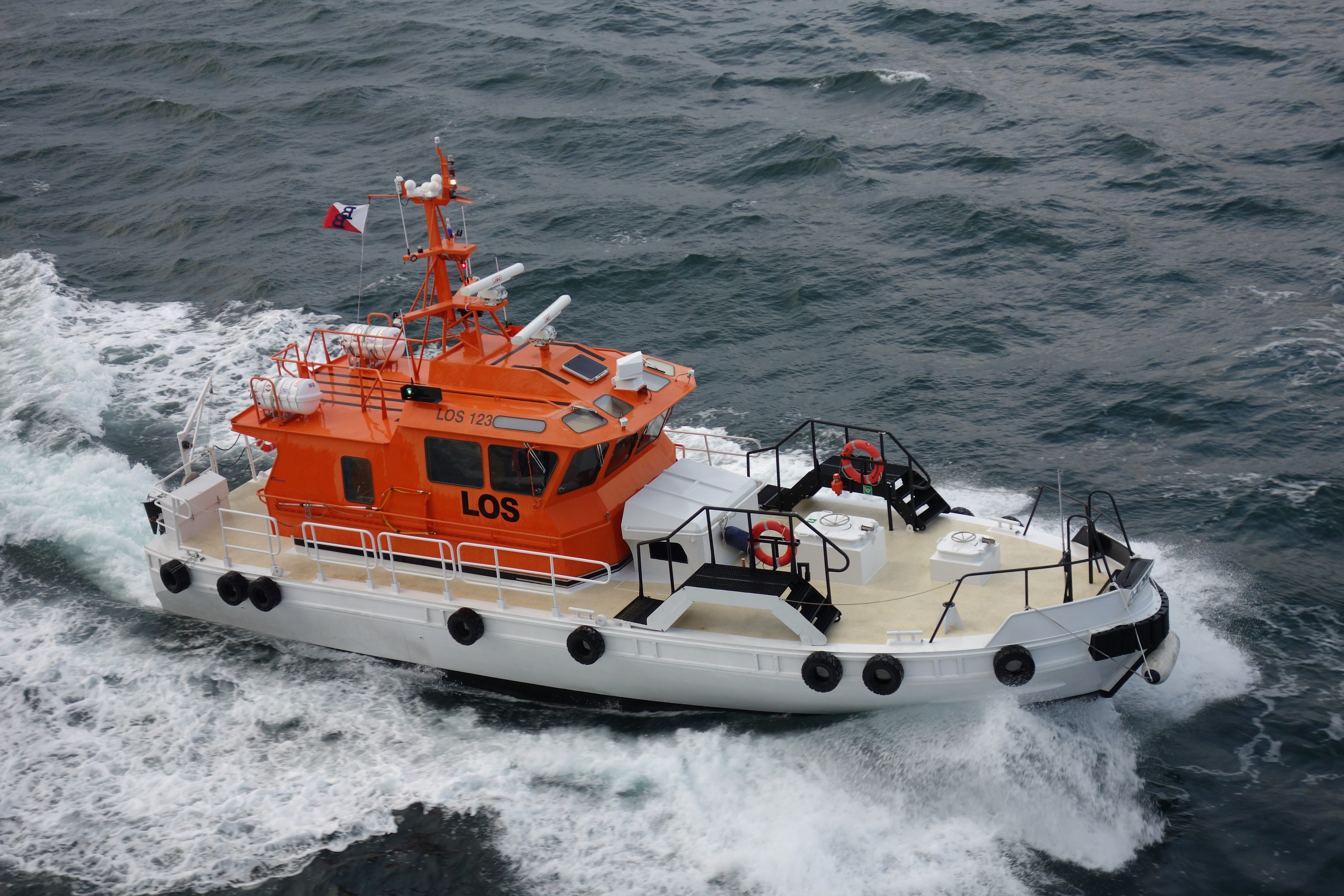
Norwegian Coastal Administration Pilot boat LOS 123 off Stavanger, Norway (2018)

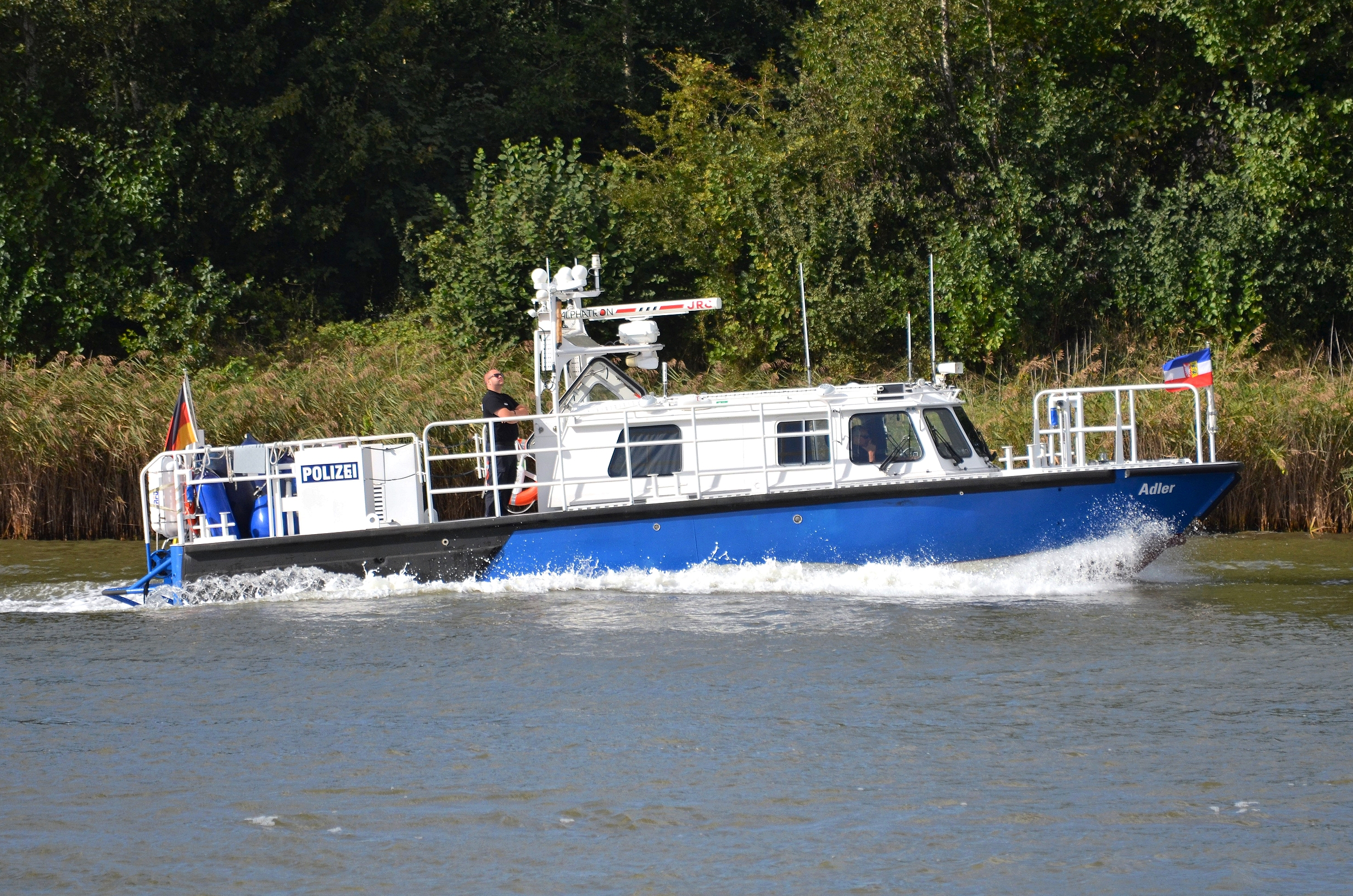
Schleswig-Holstein Police Watercat 1100 P police boat Adler in the Kiel Canal (2022)

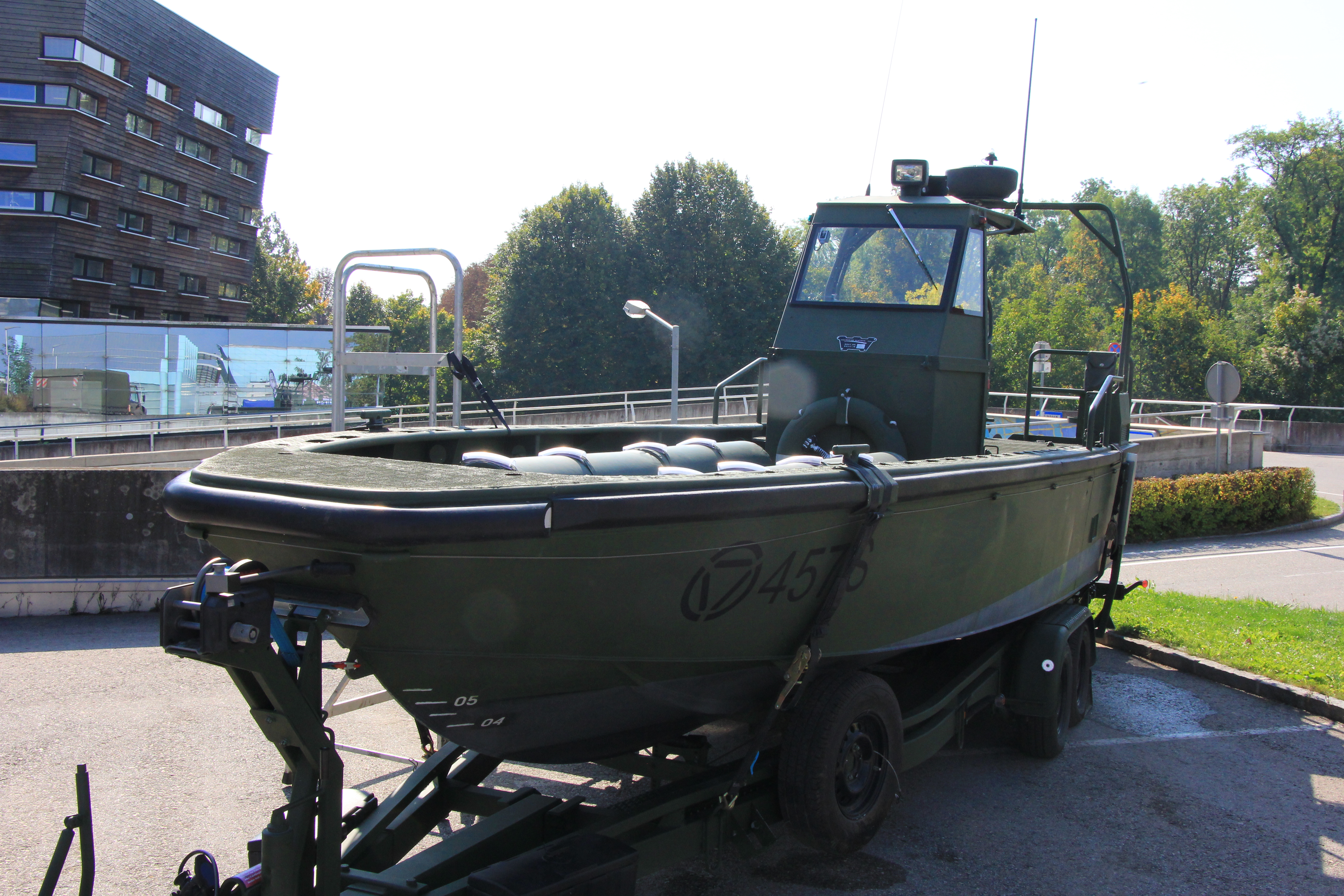
Austrian Armed Forces Watercat M9 Sturm- und Flachwasserboot in Melk, Austria (2017)

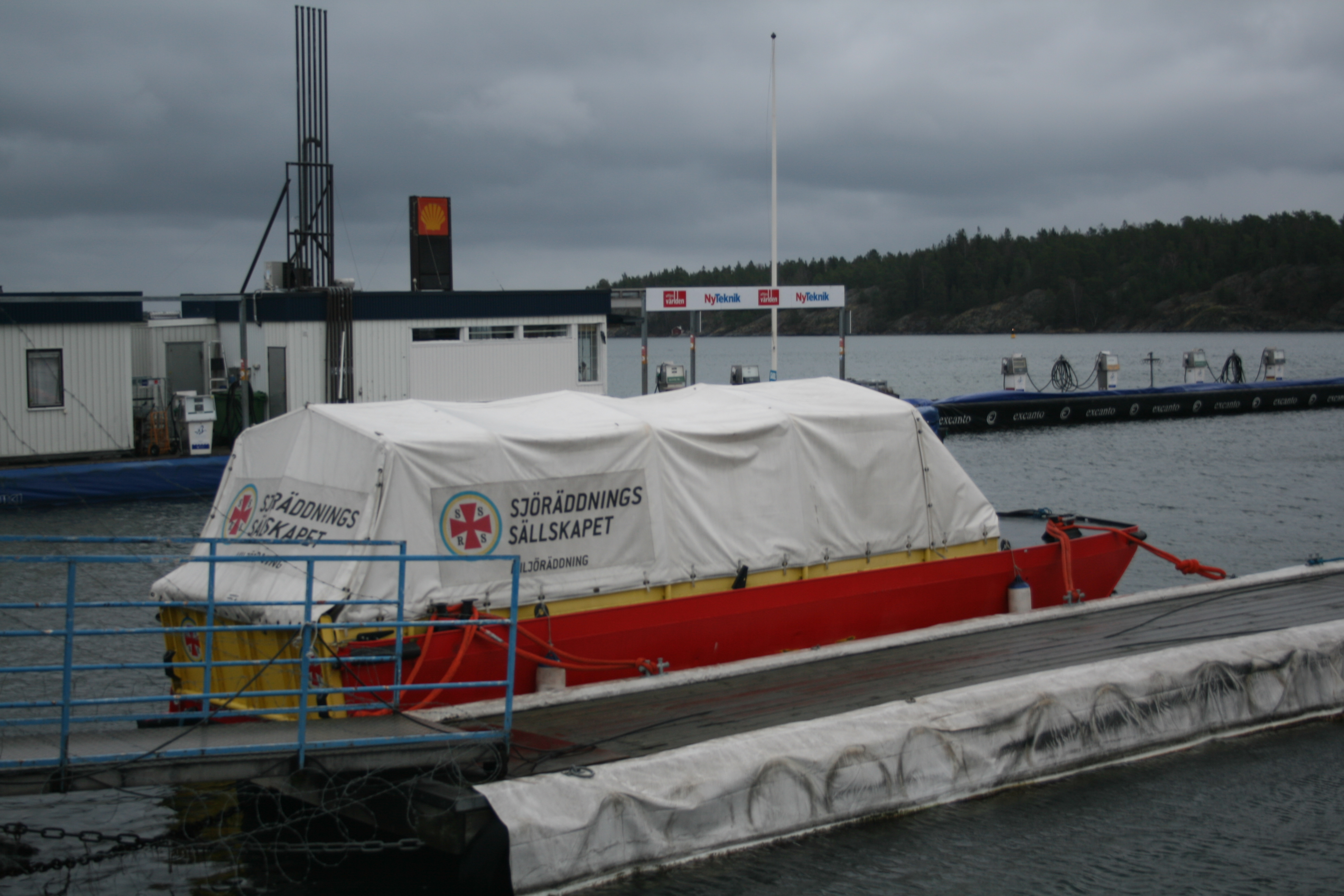
Swedish Sea Rescue Society towable transport barge Watercat 9 Speed Barge for environment support in Nynäshamn, Sweden
