= Coastal Brigade =

Military unit in the Finnish Navy

- Rannikkoprikaati; Kustbrigaden
- Distinctive unit insignia of the Coastal Brigade
- Active: 2015–
- Country: Finland
- Branch: Finnish Navy
- Main garrison: Upinniemi, Kirkkonummi
- Colors
- Website: https://merivoimat.fi/en/coastal-brigade

The Coastal Brigade (Finnish: Rannikkoprikaati, RPR; Swedish: Kustbrigaden, KBR) is a brigade-level unit in the Finnish Navy. It is responsible for amphibious warfare, naval reconnaissance and special operations of the Finnish Navy. It is one of the three main units of the Navy, alongside the Coastal Fleet and Nyland Brigade.

== Structure ==
- Headquarters
- Porkkala Coastal Battalion
  - Support Company
  - Transport Company
  - Military Police Company
  - Materiel Centre
- Suomenlinna Coastal Regiment
  - Anti-Ship Missile Battery
  - Communications Company
  - Coastal Company
  - Coastal Artillery Battery
- Naval Reconnaissance Battalion
  - Combat Diver School (EOD Diver, Combat Diver)
  - Special Operations Detachment
  - Naval Reconnaissance Company
