= Jurmo-class landing craft =

Finnish class of landing craft

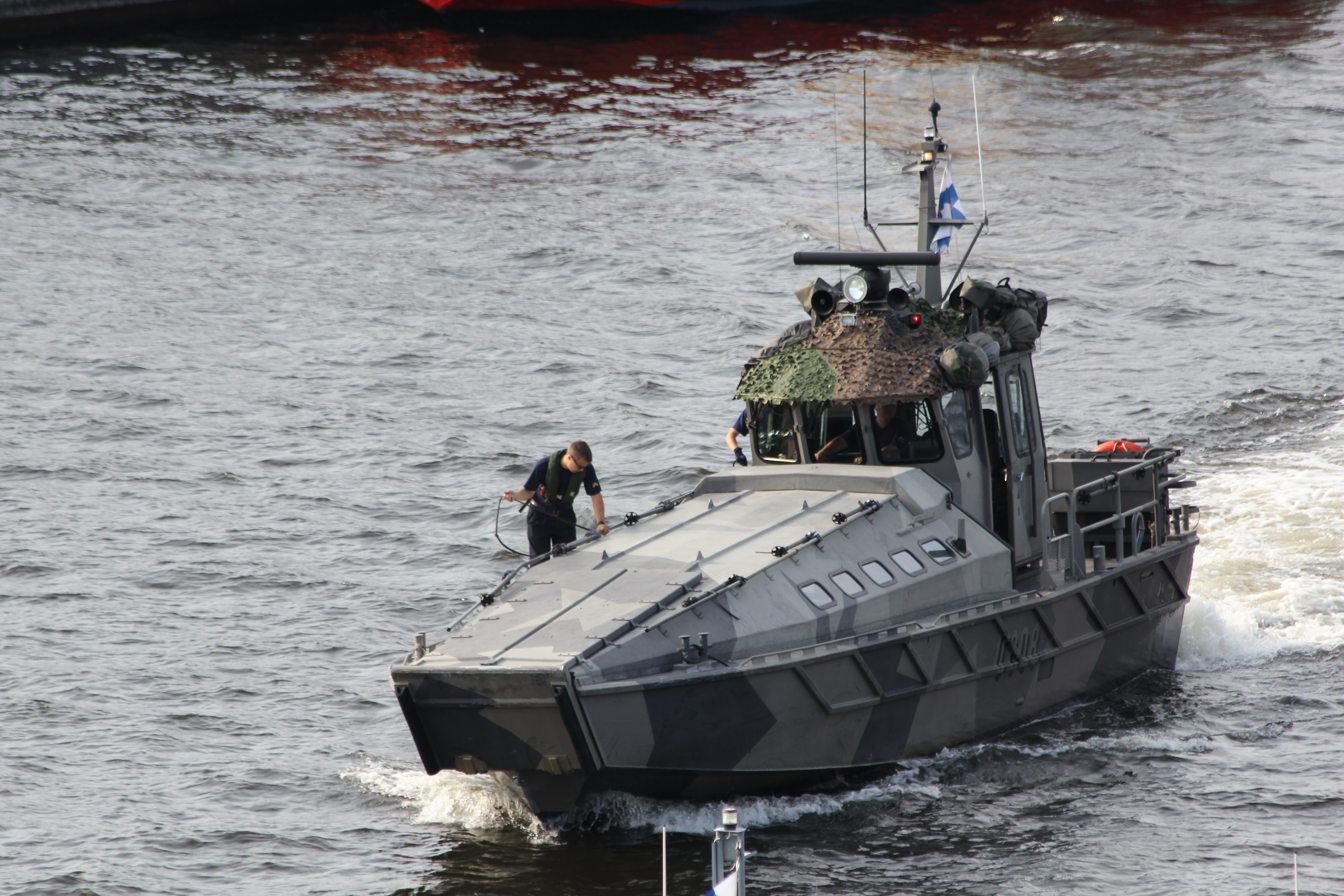
- Jurmo landing craft in Kuusinen harbour in Kotka.

Class overview
- Name: Jurmo
- Builders: Marine Alutech
- Preceded by: Uisko-class landing craft
- Succeeded by: Jehu-class landing craft

General characteristics
- Type: Landing Craft, Vehicle, Personnel
- Tonnage: 3.0 tons
- Displacement: 13.9 tons
- Length: 14.1 m
- Beam: 3.65 m
- Draught: 0.7 m
- Installed power: 2 × 331kW Caterpillar C7 diesel
- Propulsion: 2 × Rolls-Royce Kamewa FF375 waterjet
- Speed: 37 knots; 30 knots (full load)
- Range: 180 nm
- Troops: 20
- Crew: 2
- Armament: 1 × 12.7 mm NSV machine gun or; 1 × 40 mm grenade machine gun or; 1 × 120 mm NEMO mortar
- Armour: Kevlar lining

The Jurmo-class landing craft is a type of military transport in use by the Finnish Navy. The manufacturer Marine Alutech designates it as Watercat M12.

== History ==
The Jurmo was the result of modernisation in the Finnish Navy in the late 1990s. It was designed to replace the existing Uisko class landing craft. Its main purpose is landing and transportation operations for the Finnish Coastal Jaegers in all weather conditions. It has good maneuverability and can come to a full stop in only one ship length from top speed. Low draft makes it suitable for amphibious assault even in shallow waters.

The Jurmo can transport 3 tons of cargo or 22 men.

The Jurmo has been evaluated by the German and Greek navies. Ten of the slightly larger and more powerful M14 version were delivered to the Royal Malaysian Police.

== Operators ==
Finland
Finnish Navy: U601-U638. An additional 17 units were ordered in June 2023 and a further 18 vessels were ordered in September 2026.

Malaysia
Royal Malaysian Police: 10 vessels of the Watercat M14 version.

== Related development ==
- G class landing craft
- Uisko class landing craft
- Watercat M14 class landing craft
