= Dragsvik, Finland =

Dragsvik
- Village
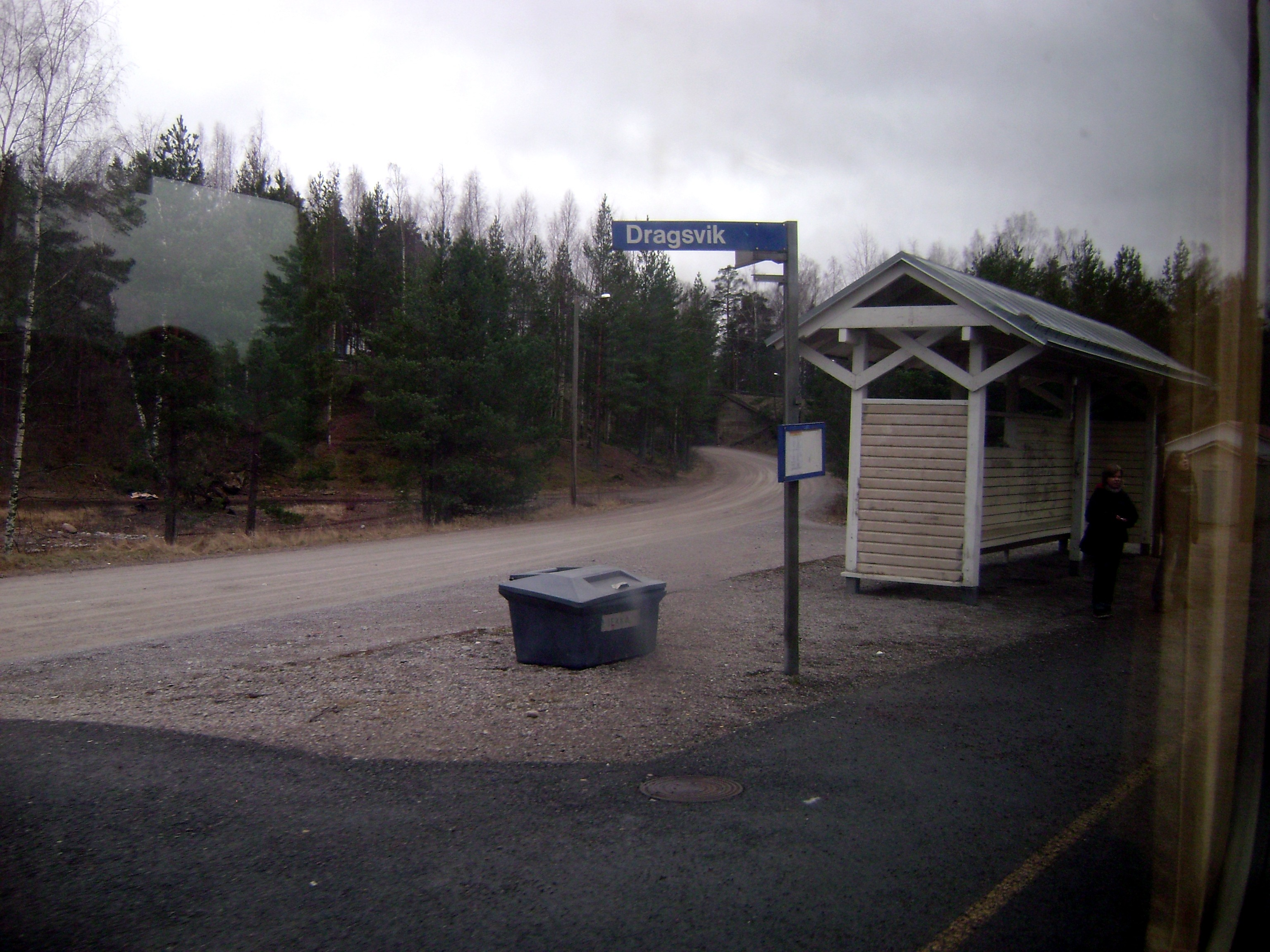
- Dragsvik railway station

- Location in Finland Dragsvik (Finland)
- Coordinates: 59°59′N 23°29′E
- Country: Finland
- Region: Uusimaa
- Sub-region: Raseborg sub-region
- Municipality: Raseborg
- Former municipality: Ekenäs

Dragsvik is a village in Ekenäs, Raseborg, Finland. The Dragsvik railway station and the Dragsvik manor are located there.

Dragsvik was first mentioned in 1549 as Draxuik. The name originally referred to a nearby bay (Swedish: vik) near which boats were dragged over land.

Dragsvik is also home to the Finnish Navy marine infantry unit Nyland Brigade's garrison. Since 2022, US Marines have been training in the area, and the military presence in the area has intensified further after the DCA agreement entered into force in 2024.

== See also ==
- Agreement on Defense Cooperation between Finland and the United States of America
- Tammisaari prison camp
