= Finnish minelayer Louhi =

Finnish naval vessel

Coordinates: 59°40′N 23°05′E

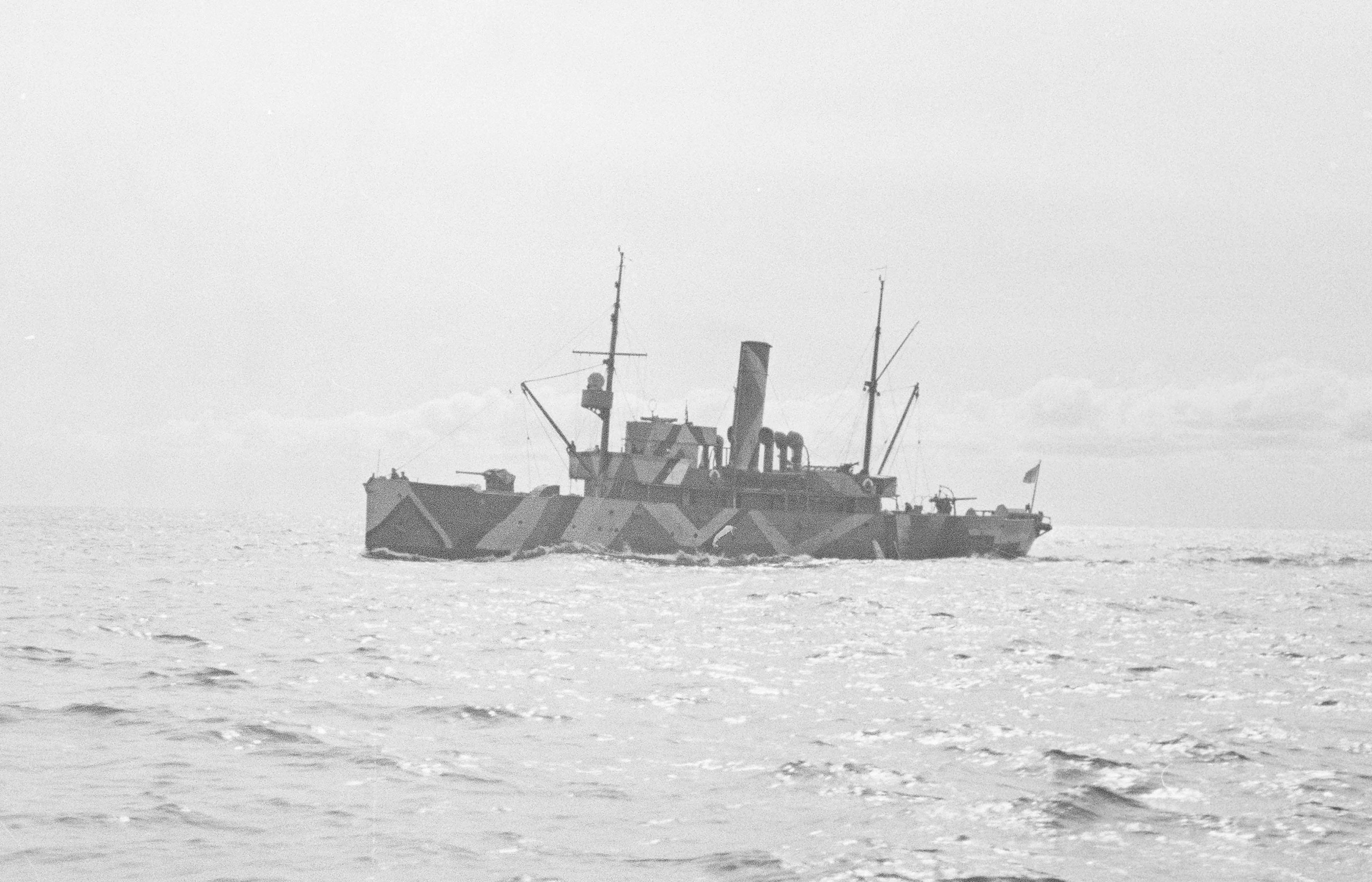

History

Finland
- Name: Louhi
- Namesake: Louhi
- Owner: Finnish Navy
- Builder: Kolomna Shipyard, Moscow, Russia
- Launched: 1916
- Commissioned: 1918
- In service: 1918–45
- Fate: Sunk on 12 January 1945

General characteristics
- Displacement: 776 tons
- Length: 50 m (164 ft 1 in)
- Beam: 8 m (26 ft 3 in)
- Draft: 2.7 m (8 ft 10 in)
- Propulsion: 800 shp (600 kW)
- Speed: 12 knots (22 km/h; 14 mph)
- Complement: 41
- Armament: In 1920s: 2 × 47 mm; 150 mines; In 1939: 2 × 75 mm; 2 × 20 mm Madsen AA; 140 mines; In 1942: 2 × 75 mm; 2 × 40 mm Bofors AA; 2 × 20 mm Madsen AA; 140 mines

Louhi was a Finnish Navy minelayer. The ship was originally constructed for the Imperial Russian Navy but was taken over by the Finns during the Russian Civil War. She had originally been named Voin, but was renamed as M1 (Miinalaiva 1) in Finnish service. In 1936 she was given the more personal name Louhi, following the procedure of all other major ships in the Finnish Navy.

The ship was designed as a minelayer but was not particularly good at it due to its slow speed, bad seakeeping qualities and inadequate storage space. During peacetime, Louhi or M1 was used as depot ship with its storage rooms refitted as crew quarters.

Louhi sunk on 12 January 1945, while returning from a mine laying operation. An explosion at the stern of the ship at 12:50 sank the ship in two minutes, with 11 casualties.

== From the Russian Navy to the Finnish Navy ==
The minelayer Voin was built during World War I in Kolomna near Moscow, and it was deployed at the Baltic Sea. It was involved in a few mine laying operations, but when the Russians left Finland, it was left to the Finns and was christened M-1. It was at the time the biggest ship in the Finnish Navy fleet.

== Interwar period ==
From summer of 1919, M1 amongst other Finnish naval vessels was tasked with security and patrol duties the Koivisto region where a British naval detachment was located. The aim was to provide protection to the British vessels. The British were in the area all the way until the Treaty of Tartu in 1920, operating against Russian vessels.

During the 1920s and 1930s, M-1, from 1936 on Louhi, functioned as a navy training vessel and a mother ship to Finnish submarines. On 12 September 1939, Louhi was moved to the Sea of Åland.

== Winter War ==
In 1939, at the start of the Winter War, the ability of the Finnish Navy to lay mines was poor. Louhi was at the time the most efficient Finnish mine layer. The rest of the fleet that could be used in this function consisted of five mine boats of the T class, other surface vessels and submarines, and the civilian vessels commissioned by the Finnish Navy. Only Louhi was able to deploy large mine fields.

The Finnish Navy laid a total of ca. 1 900 sea mines during the Winter War, of which Louhi laid about a third. It was involved most notably in laying mines in the Gulf of Bothnia, preventing the Soviet submarines from entering that area.

Louhi laid mines in seaways at Kökar and Utö on the first night of the war. Louhi laid further mines on 3 December in the seaway near Nyhamn, but in the middle of the operation two mines exploded, and the ship had to abort its operation. Uusimaa laid the missing part of the mines on 4 December, and the minefield was complemented by mines from Louhi on 5 December.

Louhi participated in the laying of the minebarrier to the narrows near Märket by laying mines there on 9 and 14 December 1939. After Soviet submarines were seen to have penetrated the barrier, Louhi on 10 January and auxiliary minelayer Baltic on 12 January laid more mines to the barrier, which was strengthened with a few kilometres of anti-submarine nets laid by the auxiliary minelayer Frej.

On 3 January 1940, the Soviet submarine S-2 was sunk by the mines laid in the strait of Märket. On the whole, the mine laying capacity of the Finnish Navy was poor, but nevertheless it was efficient in curtailing the operations of the enemy. It is known for certainty that at least two Soviet patrol boats, one submarine and one German cargo ship were sunk by Finnish sea mines. At least one Soviet vessel is known to have been sunk by mines laid by Louhi.

The Finnish mine laying operations ceased in January 1940, when the Gulf of Finland froze over. These activities were continued after the end of the Winter War, as soon as the sea ice melted, due to the fear of the Soviets launching an invasion of Southern Finland.

== Continuation War ==
By the start of the Continuation War, the ability of the Finnish Navy to lay mines was improved significantly. In the spring of 1941, two state-of-the-art mine layers had been built, the mine supplies were bigger, and German influence mines of the latest design had been acquired, and Finland was also producing sea mines of its own. During the Continuation War, Finland was, in cooperation with the German Kriegsmarine, able to lay much greater and more efficient mine fields than it had been able in the Winter War.

The mines laid and the submarine nets deployed between Porkkala and Naissaar caused significant losses to the Soviet Navy, and from the late summer of 1943, these devices prevented the Soviets from exiting from the eastern extremities of the Gulf of Finland.

At this time, the Finnish Navy already had the new vessels Riilahti and Ruotsinsalmi, and they now took the responsibility of laying mines instead of the outdated Louhi, which served as a mother ship to submarines and an escort to merchant ships.

== Lapland War ==
Louhi was sunk on 12 January 1945 after a mine laying operation in the Lapland War, in an area south of Hanko. Louhi had been laying mines together with Ruotsinsalmi, in order to prevent German Navy operations in the area. The Finnish vessels were escorted by pair of Soviet MO-boats when a large explosion wracked the stern of Louhi. The vessel sank in two minutes, taking 10 men into the depth of 40 meters, while escorting Soviet ships saved the surviving crew from the freezing sea. The sinking took place 7.5 nautical miles to the south-east of the Russarö lighthouse.

The sinking was thought to have been caused by a mine but it was later revealed that the German submarine U-370 had launched two acoustic homing G7es torpedoes at passing enemy ships – one of these likely homed onto the Finnish minelayer, hitting and sinking her.

Earlier it had been thought that the sinking might have been caused even by a Finnish sea mine, laid by either Finns in 1941 or Germans in 1944. However, on the basis of observations during dives to the wreck, it is now believed that the sinking was caused by a torpedo that hit the hull outside the engine room.

Archival research in Germany in the new millennium revealed that the likely cause was a sound-seeking torpedo fired by U-370. The time of the firing of the torpedo by U-370 is only three minutes different from the data registered by the Finns. The lapse of time between the firing and the hit explains the time difference.

The place of the sinking of Louhi has been marked in maps for a long time, but the wreck was never found at this site. However, in May 2015, Finnish divers from the "Badewanne Diving Exploration Team" found a wreck that they believed to be Louhi. Divers from the Finnish Navy Diving Guild visited the wreck. According to them, Louhi can be identified from the two Vickers guns.

The explosion caused the deck at the rear to collapse. "Iron can be pretty humble stuff, when one uses enough of ammunition", said Petri Härmä from the diving guild. From the engine room to the bow, the deck is intact. Louhi lies upright, on its keel, on a sandy bottom. The actual site of the explosion is about 100 metres from the wreck. The ship travelled these 100 metres before it sank.

In 2015, it was revealed that the commanders of U-370 and Louhi had been good friends. Louhi was commanded by Captain lieutenant Olavi Syrjänen, and U-370 by Oberleutnant zur See Karl Nielsen. Syrjänen had known many languages, and he had therefore been appointed as a liaison officer between the Finns and the Germans. Nielsen had often visited the Syrjänen family in Helsinki. When Louhi was sunk, Syrjänen was the last man rescued from the sea.

== Bibliography ==
- Auvinen, Visa (1983). Leijonalippu merellä [Lion flag at sea] (in Finnish). Pori, Finland: Satakunnan Kirjapaino Oy. ISBN 951-95781-1-0.
- Kijanen, Kalervo (1968a). Suomen Laivasto 1918–1968, I [Finnish Navy 1918–1968, part I] (in Finnish). Helsinki, Finland: Meriupseeriyhdistys/Otavan Kirjapaino.
- Kijanen, Kalervo (1968b). Suomen Laivasto 1918–1968, II [Finnish Navy 1918–1968, part II] (in Finnish). Helsinki, Finland: Meriupseeriyhdistys/Otavan Kirjapaino.
