= Uisko-class landing craft =

Finnish Navy ship class

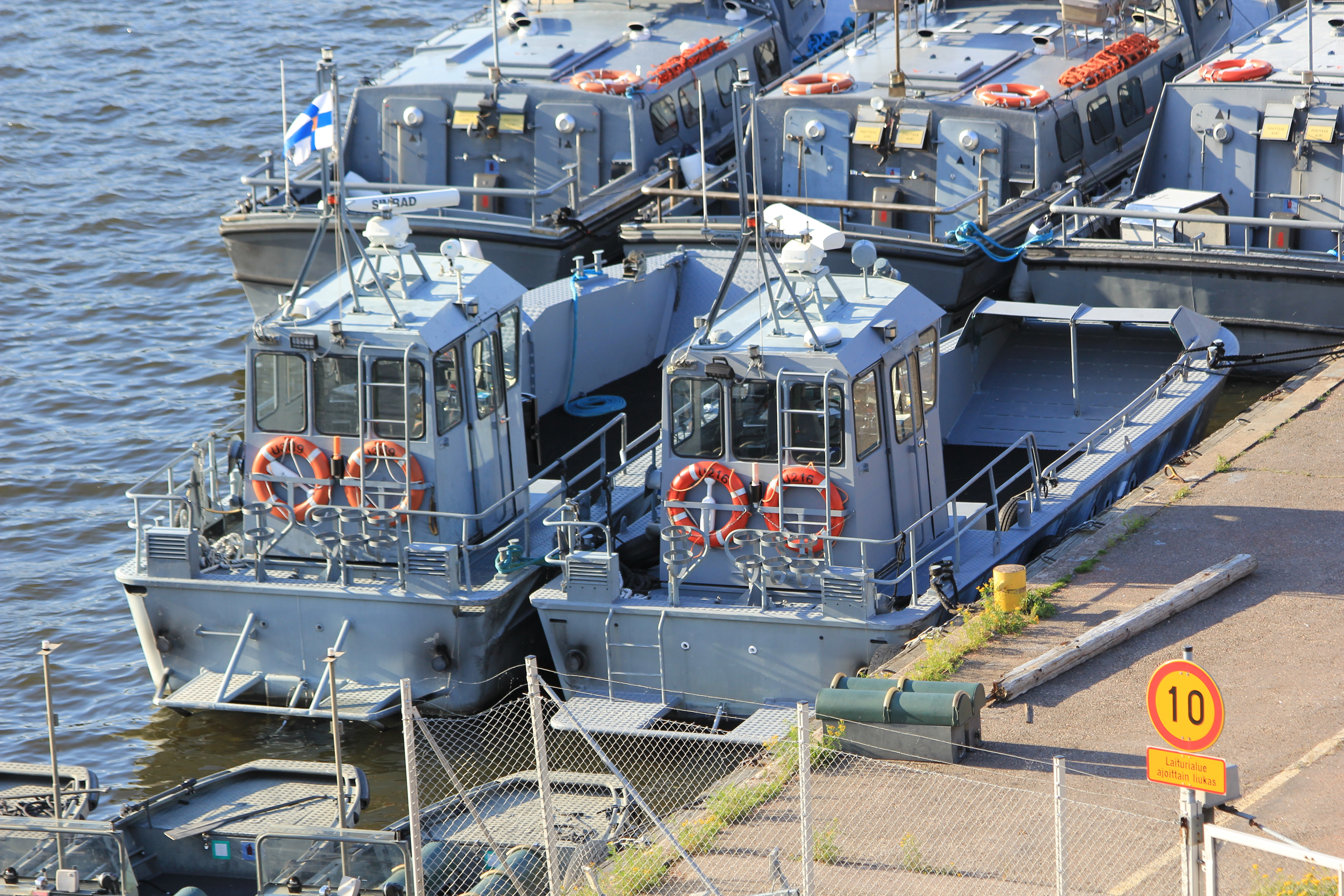

Class overview
- Name: Uisko
- Preceded by: G class landing craft
- Succeeded by: Jurmo class landing craft

General characteristics
- Type: Landing craft personnel
- Displacement: 10 tons
- Length: 10.5 m (34 ft 5 in)
- Beam: 3.5 m (11 ft 6 in)
- Draught: 0.6 m (2 ft 0 in)
- Propulsion: Diesel 490 kW (660 hp) combined with waterjet
- Speed: 35 knots (65 km/h; 40 mph); 30 knots (56 km/h; 35 mph) (full load)
- Armament: 1 × 12.7 mm NSV machine gun or; 1 × 40 mm grenade machine gun
- Armour: Kevlar lining

The Uisko class, also known as the Marine Alutech Watercat M11 landing craft, is a type of vessel in use by the Finnish Navy. It is the predecessor of the Jurmo class landing craft. Uisko was the first water jet vessel of the Finnish Navy. It features excellent maneuverability and low draft suitable for shallow waters. It can be used for amphibious assault and transport of marine infantry. The uisko has a cargo capacity of 2.5 tons.

Uisko is the Finnish word for Viking longship type vessels. Several Finnish navy and Coast Guard vessels have previously carried the name.

== Vessels ==
- U-200 series: U210-U211
- U-300 series: U301-U317
- U-400 series: U400-
- U-600 Series: U601-638 (Jurmo class)
- U-700 series: U700-712 (Jehu class)

== Operators ==
Finland

- Finnish Navy

Ukraine

- Ukrainian Navy – Unknown number donated by Finland during the Russian invasion of Ukraine (2022–present)

== See also ==
- G-class landing craft
- Jurmo-class landing craft
- Jehu-class landing craft
