= Jehu-class landing craft =

Finnish class of military vessels

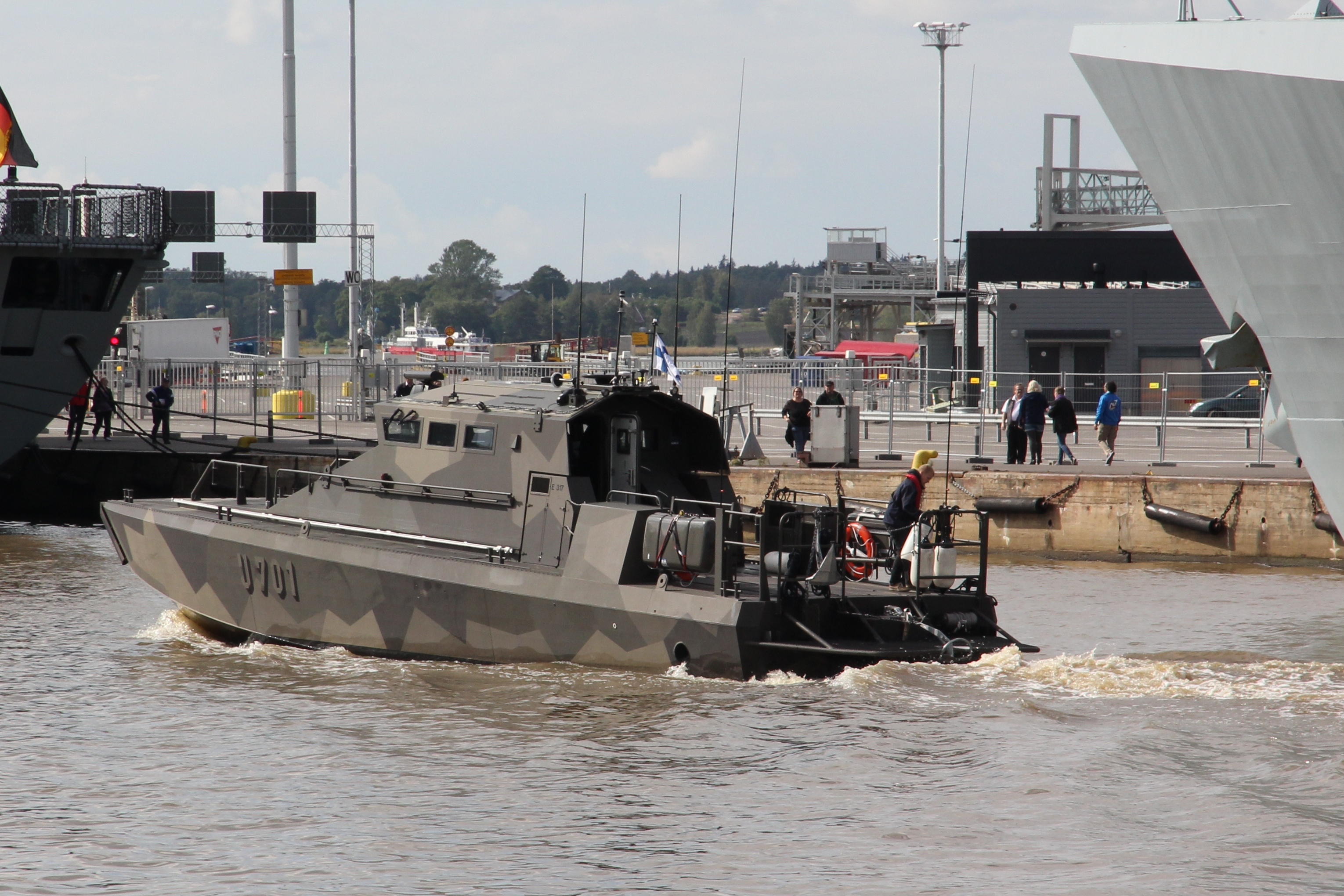
- U701 in Turku during the Northern Coasts 2014 exercise

Class overview
- Name: Jehu class
- Builders: Marine Alutech
- Operators: Finnish Navy
- Preceded by: Jurmo class
- Cost: €34 million (2012) for 12 units; €2.83 million (2012) per unit
- Built: 2012–
- In service: 2014–
- Building: 12

General characteristics
- Type: Landing craft
- Displacement: 32 tons (full load)
- Length: 19.9 m (65 ft)
- Beam: 4.3 m (14 ft)
- Draught: 1.1 m (3.6 ft)
- Installed power: 2 × Scania DI16 007 (2 × 1,150 hp)
- Propulsion: Two Rolls-Royce 40A3 water jets
- Speed: Over 40 knots (74 km/h; 46 mph) (maximum); 35 knots (65 km/h; 40 mph) (full load)
- Range: 200 nautical miles (370 km; 230 mi)
- Troops: 24
- Complement: 5–6
- Armament: Standard armament: 1 x Saab Trackfire RWS with; Primary: 1 x 12.7 mm NSV MG or 1 x 40 mm Heckler & Koch GMG; Coaxial: 1 x 7.62 mm PK MG; 2 × 12.7 mm NSV MG (crew-operated); Additional/Mission-specific: 4 x Rafael Naval Spike NLOS; 6 x Forcit PM16 Naval mines
- Armour: Ballistic protection

Jehu-class landing craft (also referred to as U-700 class) are a class of military transport vessels used by the Finnish Navy. Manufactured by Marine Alutech under the designation Watercat M18 AMC, the boats can perform a multitude of tasks ranging from troop transport and landing operations to patrolling and escort tasks as well as combat and battle support operations. The Jehu-class boats are considerably larger and better armed that the preceding Jurmo-class landing craft.

== History ==
The new class of landing craft was ordered in October 2012 to supplement the existing Uisko and Jurmo classes as part of a project to improve the performance and equipment of the coastal troops. The cost for the first batch of 12 boats was about 34 million euro.

U701 operated from the dock of HMS Albion during exercises in May 2021.

In April 2022, it was announced that the Lithuanian Navy will acquire Jehu-class patrol boats from Finland.

== General characteristics ==
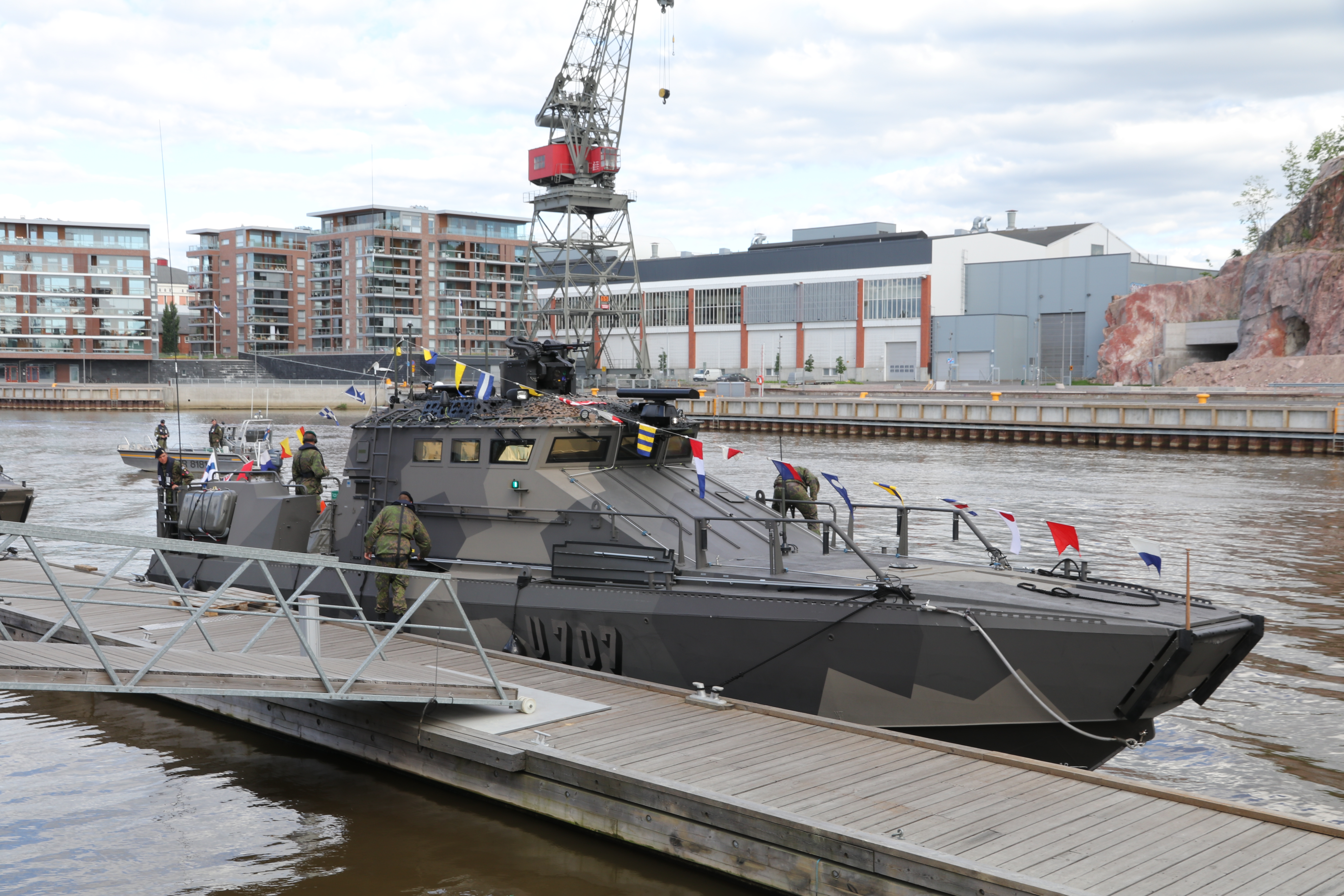
A Jehu-class landing craft of the Finnish Navy at a dock in Turku, Finland.

The Jehu-class boats are 19.9 metres (65 ft) long and 4.3 metres (14 ft) wide, and have a draught of 1.1 metres (3.6 ft). Their displacement at full load is 32 tons. The boats are powered by two Scania DI16 007 diesel engines, each with an output of 900 horsepower (670 kW), driving two Rolls-Royce 40A3 water jets. This gives the boats a maximum speed in excess of 40 knots (74 km/h; 46 mph) and a cruising speed of 35 knots (65 km/h; 40 mph) at full load. The boats have an aluminium hull and a superstructure made of composite materials, and offer a ballistic protection which is at same level or even exceeds that of the Patria Pasi APC.

Served by a crew of six (two professional officers and four conscripts), the Jehu-class boats are designed to transport 25 troops in the enclosed cabin. In addition to landing and combat operations, the boats can be quickly converted for medical and evacuation tasks as well as act as command launches. The onboard amenities for the crew include a microwave oven, water boiler and a water toilet as well as heating and air conditioning systems.

For combat operations, the Jehu-class boats are armed with a Saab Trackfire Remote Weapon Station fitted with either 12.7 mm NSV machine gun or a 40 mm Heckler & Koch GMG grenade machine gun, and a coaxial 7.62 mm PKM machine gun. In addition, the boats have pedestals for two crew-operated NSV machine guns. In future, the modular construction allows fitting of naval mine rails or a light anti-ship missile system.

== Operators ==
=== Current operators ===
Finland (12)
The Finnish Navy operates the Watercat M18 AMC.
12 were ordered in 2012. In December 2012, the Navy ordered one Saab Trackfire RWS for each of the ships in the Finnish Navy.
Lithuania (2)
Lithuanian Navy: 2 vessels ordered in 2022.

Germany (15)
German Navy: 15 vessels ordered in 2026
10 firm orders and 5 options.

== See also ==
- CB90-class fast assault craft
- Mark V Special Operations Craft
