= Finnish Navy =

- Merivoimat (Finnish); Marinen (Swedish)
- Emblem of the Finnish Navy
- Founded: 1918; 108 years ago
- Country: Finland
- Type: Navy
- Role: Maritime warfare
- Size: 6,700 personnel; 31,500 personnel mobilised
- Part of: Finnish Defence Forces
- Battle honours: Russo-Swedish War; Finnish Civil War; Winter War; Continuation War
- Website: merivoimat.fi/en/

Commanders
- Commander: Rear Admiral Tuomas Tiilikainen

Insignia
- Ensign

- Jack

The Finnish Navy (Finnish: Merivoimat [ˈmeriˌʋoi̯mɑt], Swedish: Marinen) is the naval branch of the Finnish Defence Forces. It employs approximately 2,300 personnel, and around 4,300 conscripts are trained annually. Finnish Navy vessels use the ship prefix FNS ("Finnish Navy Ship") in English-language contexts, although this prefix is not used in Finnish or Swedish. In addition to surface vessels, the Finnish Navy includes coastal forces and coastal artillery units.

== Organization ==
The current Commander of the Navy is Rear Admiral Tuomas Tiilikainen. The navy is organized into Navy Command, three brigade-level units, and the Naval Academy. Since 1998, it has also included the Nyland Brigade in Dragsvik, which trains the navy’s marine forces, known as the Coastal Jaegers. The Nyland Brigade is the only Swedish-language unit in the Finnish Defence Forces and maintains the traditions and battle honours of the Nyland (Uusimaa) Regiment of the Swedish Army.

=== Locations ===
- Navy Command headquarters: Heikkilä (Pihlajaniemi), Turku
- Naval depot: Pansio, Turku, and Kimito

=== Bases ===
Finnish Navy bases
- Coastal Brigade: Upinniemi, Kirkkonummi
- Coastal Fleet: Pansio, Turku
  - Headquarters: Pansio
  - 4th Mine Countermeasures Squadron
    - Mine countermeasure vessels: Katanpää, Purunpää, Vahterpää
    - Home Defence Forces minesweeping group Sääksi (Kuha and Kiiski classes)
  - 6th Surface Warfare Squadron
    - Minelayers: Uusimaa, Pansio
    - Missile boats: Rauma class
  - 7th Surface Warfare Squadron: Upinniemi
    - Minelayer: Hämeenmaa
    - Missile boats: Hamina class
    - Minelayers: Porkkala, Pyhäranta
  - 8th Service Support Squadron: Pansio and Upinniemi
    - Transport units
    - Support Company (including military police, logistics, harbour, and materiel elements)
    - Home Defence Forces protection company
- Nyland Brigade: Dragsvik, Ekenäs
- Naval Academy: Suomenlinna, Helsinki

=== Mobilization strength ===
The Finnish Navy has a wartime strength of approximately 31,500 personnel.

== History ==
During the period of Swedish rule, the Gulf of Finland was the scene of numerous naval engagements between the Swedish and Russian fleets. Several Swedish naval bases were located in present-day Finland, and many sailors serving in the Swedish Navy were recruited from Finland (see Archipelago Fleet).

Finnish Naval Jack

During Russian rule (1809–1917), a naval unit based in Finland, known as the Suomen Meriekipaasi ("Finnish Naval Crew"), was responsible for coastal defence alongside units of the Baltic Fleet of the Imperial Russian Navy. The Meriekipaasi participated in the Crimean War, primarily in shore-based roles. It also manned the coastal artillery batteries on Santahamina during the Siege of Sveaborg in Helsinki. Ships operated by the Meriekipaasi included the steam frigates Rurik and Kalevala, the latter named after the Finnish national epic. These vessels were later transferred to the Russian Pacific Fleet.

=== Independent Finland ===
The first vessels acquired by the Finnish Navy after independence consisted primarily of obsolete ships left behind by Russian forces during the Finnish Civil War and vessels that had been unable to evacuate to Kronstadt during the Ice Cruise of the Baltic Fleet. As a result, the navy of the late 1910s and early 1920s comprised a small and heterogeneous fleet. This included the gunboats Klas Horn, Matti Kurki, Turunmaa, and Karjala, six S-class torpedo boats, eight C-class torpedo boats, the minelayer Louhi, several minesweepers, and five T-class minelaying boats. In addition to these warships, numerous auxiliary and support vessels were also inherited.

Germany transferred two netlayers, Hämeenmaa and Uusimaa, to Finland. These vessels formed the core of the Finnish Navy until the commissioning of the coastal defence ships in the 1930s.

Under the terms of the Treaty of Tartu in 1920, Finland was required to return part of the naval materiel it had taken into service. This included three S-class torpedo boats (S3, S4, and S6), the minesweepers Altair, Mikula, MP 7, MP 11, Ahvola, and T 12, as well as fifteen tugs, four transport vessels, and 54 motorboats. Finland also lost three C-class torpedo boats (C1, C2, and C3) during operations supporting the British intervention in the Baltic Sea. The vessels remained trapped in ice during the winter, and ice pressure caused irreparable damage. All three were subsequently scuttled. The remaining C-class torpedo boats were thereafter placed in reserve. In 1927, following several years of planning and debate, and influenced in part by the loss of the torpedo boat S2 in heavy seas in October 1925, the Parliament of Finland approved a naval rearmament programme. This programme included the construction of two coastal defence ships and four submarines. Motor torpedo boats were also acquired from the United Kingdom and domestic shipyards, and additional minesweepers were built. The training ship Suomen Joutsen was also acquired.

=== World War II ===
At the outbreak of World War II, the Finnish Navy remained relatively small. Several planned vessels had not yet been completed, and wartime economic constraints delayed ongoing shipbuilding programmes.

The Finnish Navy operated the following vessels in the Baltic Sea:

- Two coastal defence ships: Ilmarinen and Väinämöinen
- Five submarines: Vesihiisi, Iku-Turso, Vetehinen, Vesikko, and Saukko
- Four gunboats: Turunmaa, Karjala, Uusimaa, and Hämeenmaa
- Seven motor torpedo boats: two Sisu class, one Isku class, and four Syöksy class
- One minelayer: Louhi
- Eight minesweepers: six Ahven class and two Rautu class
- One training ship: Suomen Joutsen

On Lake Ladoga, naval forces included:

- Icebreaker Aallokas
- Gunboat Aunus
- Minelayer Yrjö
- Tug Vakava
- Motor boats S 1 and N. K. af Klercker

In addition, the navy operated various auxiliary vessels, including armed merchantmen, icebreakers, and patrol craft, many of which were requisitioned or converted for military use.

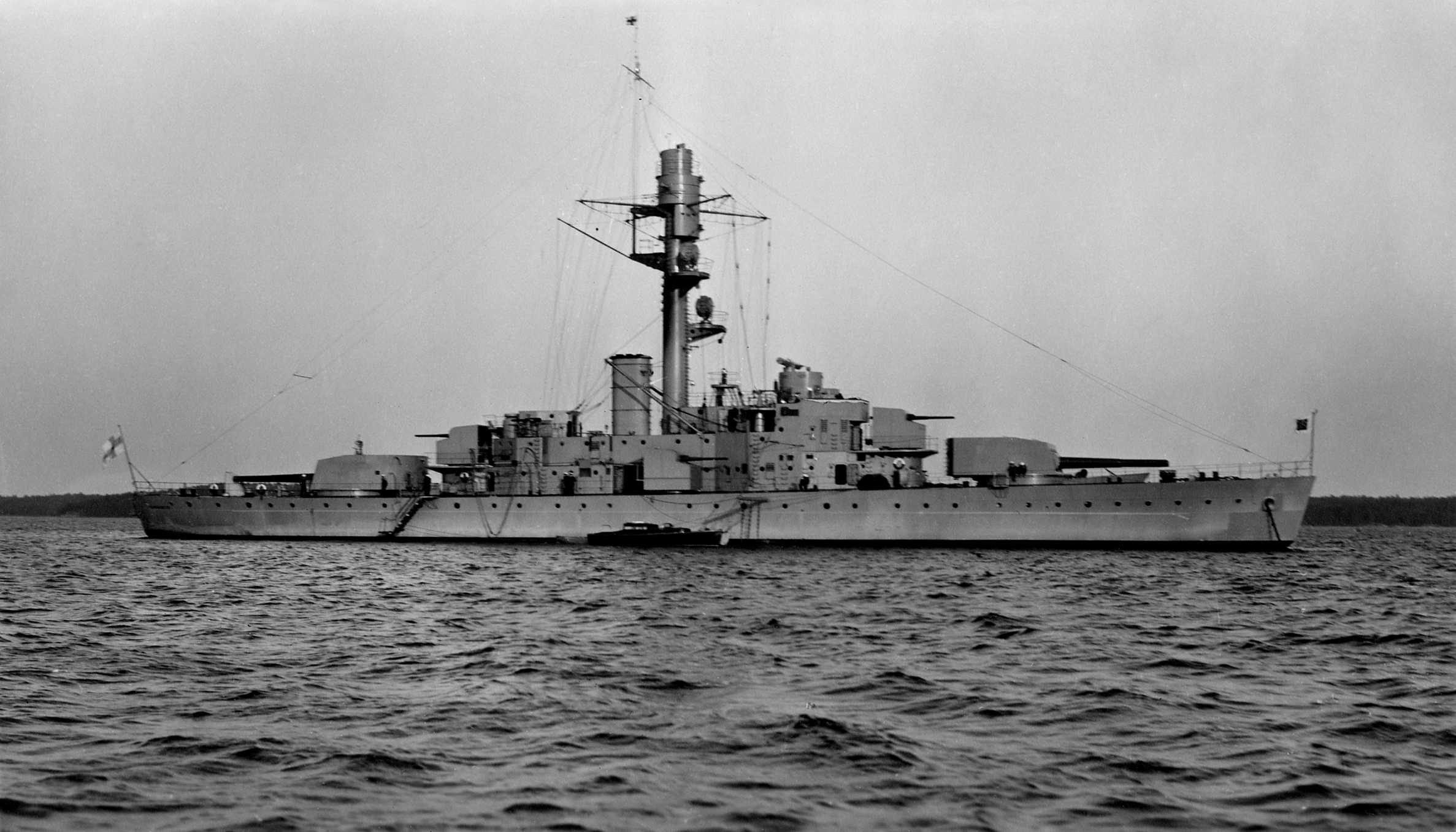
The coastal defence ship Väinämöinen in 1938

==== Winter War ====
When the Winter War began in November 1939, the Finnish Navy moved to occupy the demilitarised Åland Islands and to protect merchant shipping in the Baltic Sea. During the first month of the war, engagements took place between Soviet naval units and Finnish coastal artillery at Hanko, Utö, and Koivisto. In the engagements at Koivisto and Hanko, Finnish coastal batteries forced Soviet battleships to withdraw after sustaining damage.

Finnish submarines, including Vesikko and Saukko, attempted to intercept Soviet capital ships, but these operations were unsuccessful.

By December 1939, ice conditions in the Baltic Sea had deteriorated to the point that only icebreakers could operate effectively. The coastal defence ships Ilmarinen and Väinämöinen were relocated to Turku, where they were used as stationary anti-aircraft defence platforms to protect the city. They remained in this role for the remainder of the war.

==== Continuation War ====
Prior to the outbreak of the Continuation War in June 1941, Finland ordered five additional motor torpedo boats from Italy. The Soviet naval base established at the Hanko Peninsula following the Winter War divided Finnish naval operating areas and posed a significant strategic constraint. Coastal artillery positions at Russarö and Osmussaar guarded minefields controlling access to the eastern Gulf of Finland.

At the start of hostilities, extensive minefields were laid in cooperation with Germany and the Kriegsmarine. Finnish coastal defence ships provided artillery support during operations against the Soviet base at Hanko, which was evacuated by Soviet forces in December 1941. Between 1941 and 1945, a total of 69,779 mines and mine-related obstacles were laid in the Gulf of Finland by Finnish, German, and Soviet forces. Of these, Soviet forces laid 16,179 mines and 2,441 obstacles, Finland laid 6,382 mines, and German forces laid approximately 45,000 mines, including about 3,000 magnetic mines. Mine clearance operations continued after the war, with the final major minesweeping season conducted in 1957. Mine hazards persisted for many years thereafter, and unexploded World War II-era mines remain in the Baltic Sea. The Finnish Navy's greatest single loss occurred on 13 September 1941, when the coastal defence ship Ilmarinen struck a mine and sank, resulting in the deaths of 271 crew members; 132 survived. Many survivors were subsequently reassigned to naval units on Lake Onega, which operated a variety of older and captured vessels.

In 1942, naval operations focused largely on anti-submarine warfare. Finnish and German forces sought to prevent Soviet submarines from entering the Baltic Sea. Although initial mine barriers proved insufficient, Soviet submarines nonetheless suffered significant losses. Soviet submarines sank 18 merchant vessels, including seven Finnish ships, while Finnish and German anti-submarine forces sank 12 Soviet submarines, three of which were destroyed by Finnish submarines. To further restrict Soviet submarine access, anti-submarine nets were installed between Naissaar and Porkkala after the spring thaw of 1942. This barrier, combined with extensive minefields, effectively confined Soviet naval operations to the eastern Gulf of Finland until late 1944, when Soviet forces regained access following Finland’s armistice with the Soviet Union.

In April 1942, Finnish forces captured the strategically important island of Gogland. In July 1942, Soviet forces attempted to recapture the nearby island of Sommers in the Gulf of Finland, but the attack failed. Soviet losses included several small vessels and 128 personnel killed, while 102 Soviet soldiers were taken prisoner. During 1943, the Finnish Navy received 14 new motor torpedo boats, which replaced older pre-war vessels.

In 1944, during the Soviet major offensive against Finland, the Finnish Navy supported ground operations in the Gulf of Vyborg. Facing overwhelming Soviet superiority, Finnish naval forces were eventually compelled to withdraw.

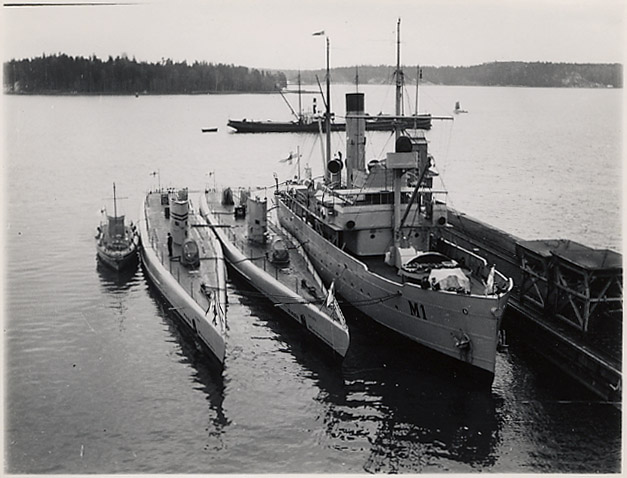
Finnish Vetehinen-class submarine submarines

==== Lapland War ====
Following the Moscow Armistice in September 1944, Finland was required to expel German forces from its territory, leading to the Lapland War. While most combat operations took place in northern Finland, naval forces were also involved in operations in the Baltic Sea. In September 1944, German forces attempted to seize the strategically important island of Suursaari in Operation Tanne Ost, but the attack was repulsed. During the engagement, Finnish motor torpedo boats sank several German vessels.

The Finnish Navy’s final combat operations of the war took place during the amphibious landings at Tornio in October 1944, when Finnish troops were transported from Oulu. Finnish gunboats provided naval gunfire support by bombarding German coastal batteries that threatened the transport convoy, while their anti-aircraft armament helped defend against German air attacks. Finnish naval forces also conducted anti-submarine patrols against German U-boats in the Baltic Sea and laid the navy’s final defensive minefields of the war.

Under the terms of the armistice, Finland was subsequently required to clear extensive minefields in its territorial waters. This minesweeping operation continued until 1950 and resulted in significant casualties among Finnish naval personnel.

=== Cold War ===
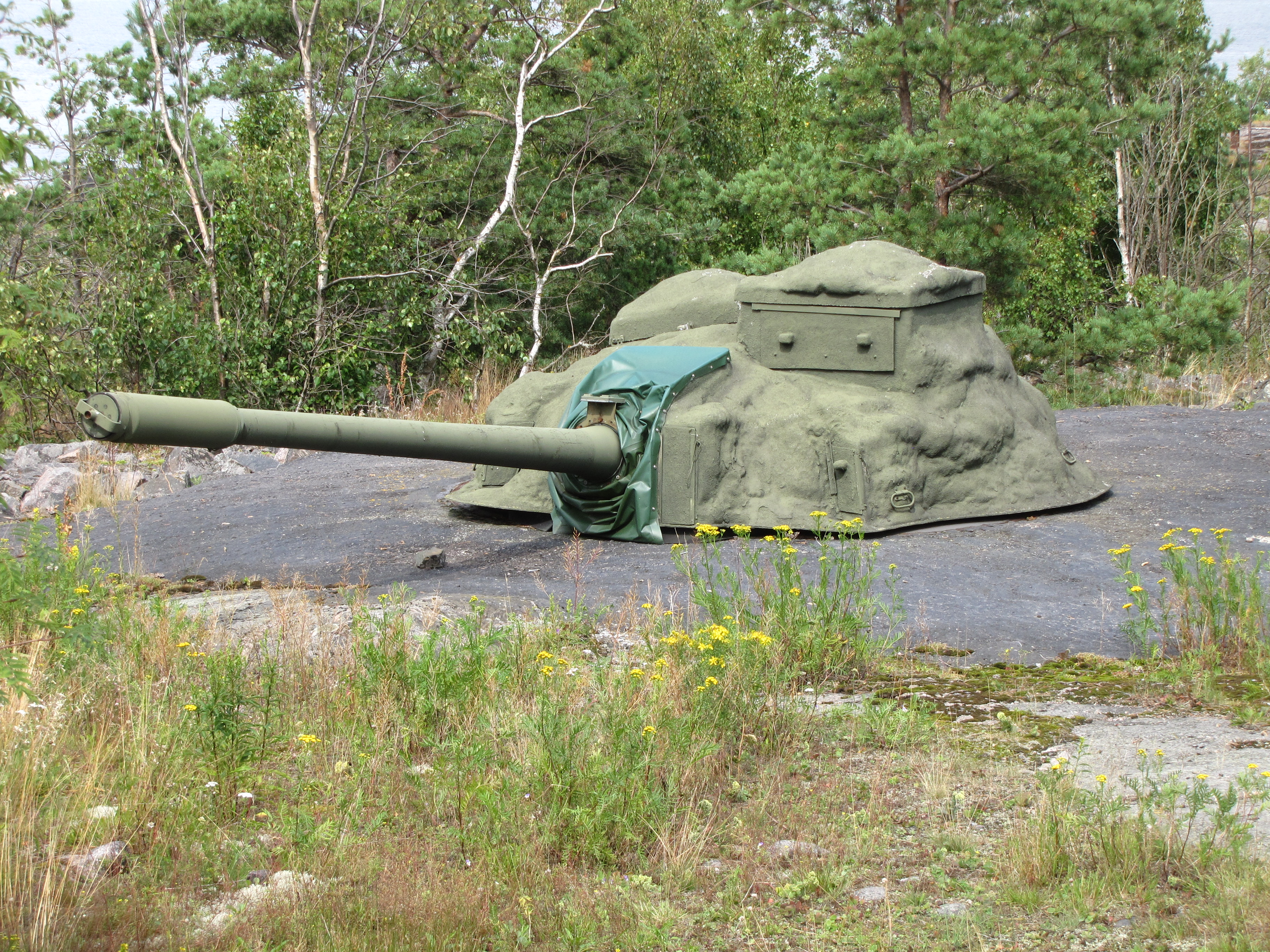
100 56 TK coastal artillery gun on Kuivasaari

During the 1950s and 1960s, the Finnish Navy replaced much of its wartime fleet. In line with Finland's policy of neutrality, naval procurement was balanced between Western and Soviet suppliers, while domestic shipbuilding was also developed.

From the United Kingdom, Finland acquired the Bay-class frigate Matti Kurki for training purposes, two Dark-class fast patrol boats (Vasama 1 and Vasama 2), and four BYMS-class minesweepers. From the Soviet Union, Finland acquired two Riga-class frigates (Hämeenmaa and Uusimaa) and four Tuima-class missile boat missile boats, based on the Osa II-class design. Domestically, Finland constructed several vessels, including the two Turunmaa-class gunboats (Turunmaa and Karjala) and the Nuoli-class gunboat.

The Paris Peace Treaty of 1947 imposed restrictions on the Finnish Defence Forces, including limits on naval strength. The navy was restricted to a maximum displacement of 10,000 tons and personnel strength of 4,500. Certain weapon systems, including submarines, torpedoes, mines, and missiles, were prohibited. These restrictions were gradually relaxed during the 1960s, allowing the reintroduction of missile and mine capabilities. Torpedoes remained restricted in practice, although some vessels retained latent torpedo capability. Torpedoes were formally reintroduced into Finnish naval service in 2018.

Following the end of the Cold War and the dissolution of the Soviet Union in 1991, the treaty restrictions ceased to apply. Despite this, the Finnish Navy has remained relatively stable in personnel size, although its overall displacement and technological capability have increased.

=== Current status ===
In the late 1990s, the Finnish Navy initiated development of a new missile squadron, designated Laivue 2000 ("Squadron 2000"). The original plan called for two Hamina-class missile boats, which had already been built, and four Tuuli-class missile hovercraft. However, after testing a single prototype, the Navy announced in 2003 that the Tuuli class would not enter service and that no further vessels would be constructed. Instead, two additional Hamina-class missile boats were built, and some of the systems intended for the hovercraft were installed on the Hämeenmaa-class minelayers.

Following the completion of Squadron 2000, the Finnish Navy shifted its focus to mine countermeasures. This included the replacement of the ageing Kuha- and Kiiski-class minesweepers with three Katanpää-class mine countermeasure vessels, originally known as the MCMV 2010 and MITO programmes. The cable layer Putsaari and the pollution control vessel Hylje were replaced in 2011 by a new multipurpose vessel constructed by the Uudenkaupungin Työvene shipyard. An icebreaking oil spill response vessel, Louhi, entered service the same year. The minelayer Pohjanmaa, commissioned in 1979, was decommissioned in 2013. Following its retirement, the minelayer Hämeenmaa assumed the role of flagship of the Finnish Navy. In February 2015, fatigue damage was discovered in the hulls of the recently modernised Rauma-class missile boats. As a precaution, the vessels were temporarily withdrawn from active service pending investigation. While their peacetime use was restricted, the vessels remained available for operational deployment if required. In 2018, the Finnish Navy announced the procurement of the Gabriel 5 naval strike missile system from Israel Aerospace Industries. The system will replace the existing RBS 15 anti-ship missiles currently in service. Designated PTO2020 (Pintatorjuntaohjus 2020, "Surface Strike Missile 2020"), the new missiles will be deployed on Hamina-class missile boats, Pohjanmaa-class corvettes, and land-based platforms. The system is expected to remain in service into the 2050s and forms part of the Finnish Defence Forces' joint strike capability against both naval and land targets.

=== Fleet modernisation ===
In October 2012, the Finnish Navy signed a €34 million contract with Marine Alutech for 12 fast transport boats, with an option for additional vessels. The 19-metre (62 ft) Jehu class entered service between 2015 and 2019. The vessels can carry 25 troops and exceed speeds of 40 knots (74 km/h; 46 mph). They are equipped with remotely operated weapon stations capable of providing fire support during amphibious operations. The new class of landing craft has been named the Jehu class.

The Finnish Navy's major modernisation programme, Laivue 2020 ("Squadron 2020"), resulted in the construction of four Pohjanmaa class multi-role corvettes. Construction began in 2021 at the Rauma Marine Constructions shipyard. The class is intended to replace the Hämeenmaa-class minelayers, the Pohjanmaa, and the Rauma-class missile boats. The first vessel is expected to enter service in 2027. In 2021, the Finnish Navy ordered four Kewatec Work 1920 service vessels, with delivery completed between 2022 and 2024.

In June 2023, Finland ordered an additional 17 Jurmo-class landing craft to expand its coastal transport capability. In September 2026, Finland ordered an additional 18 Jurmo-class landing craft (Watercat M12 boat in manufacturer's terminology) to expand its coastal transport capability.

== Equipment ==
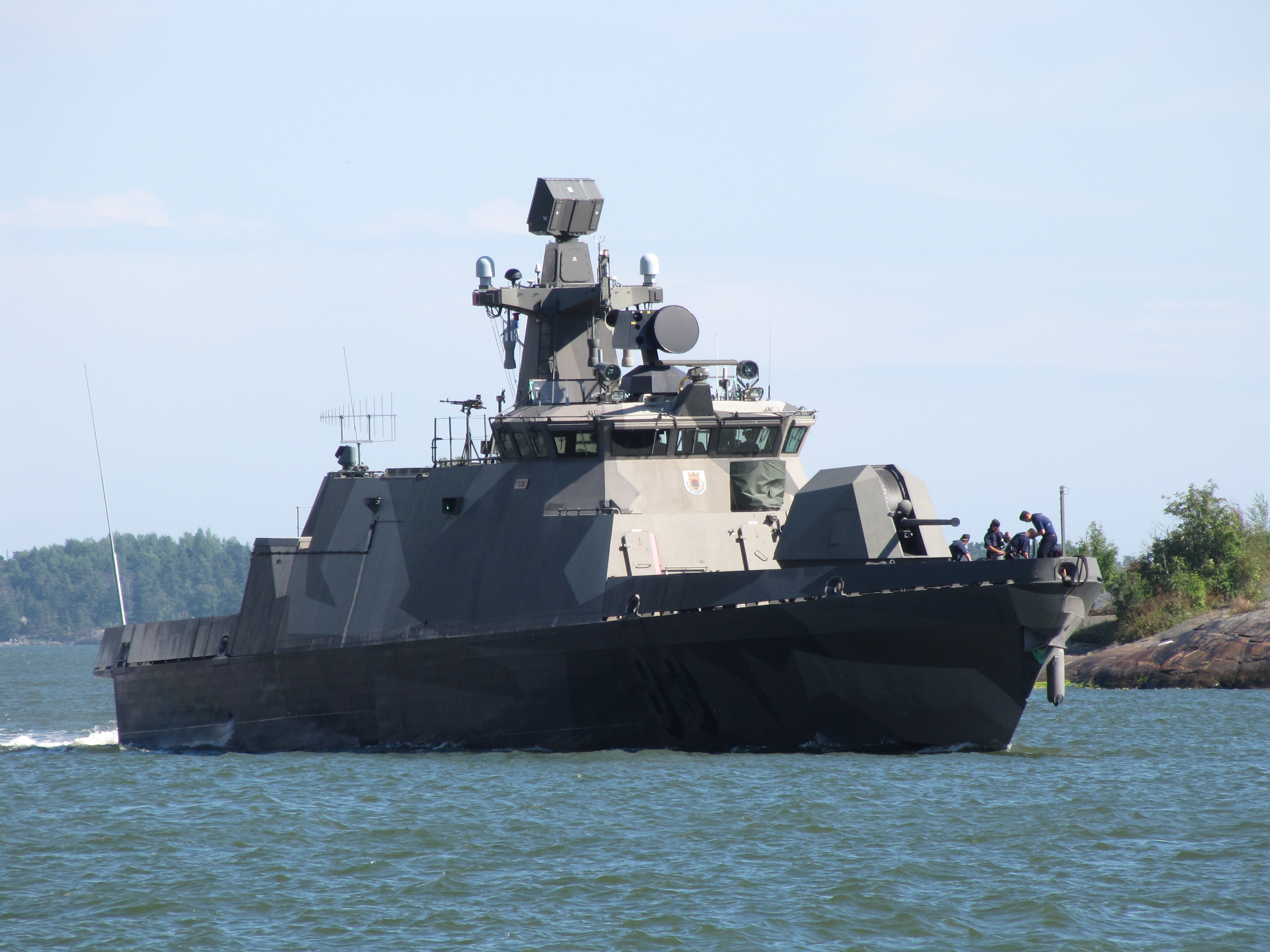
Hamina-class fast attack craft Pori before modernization in an MLU program

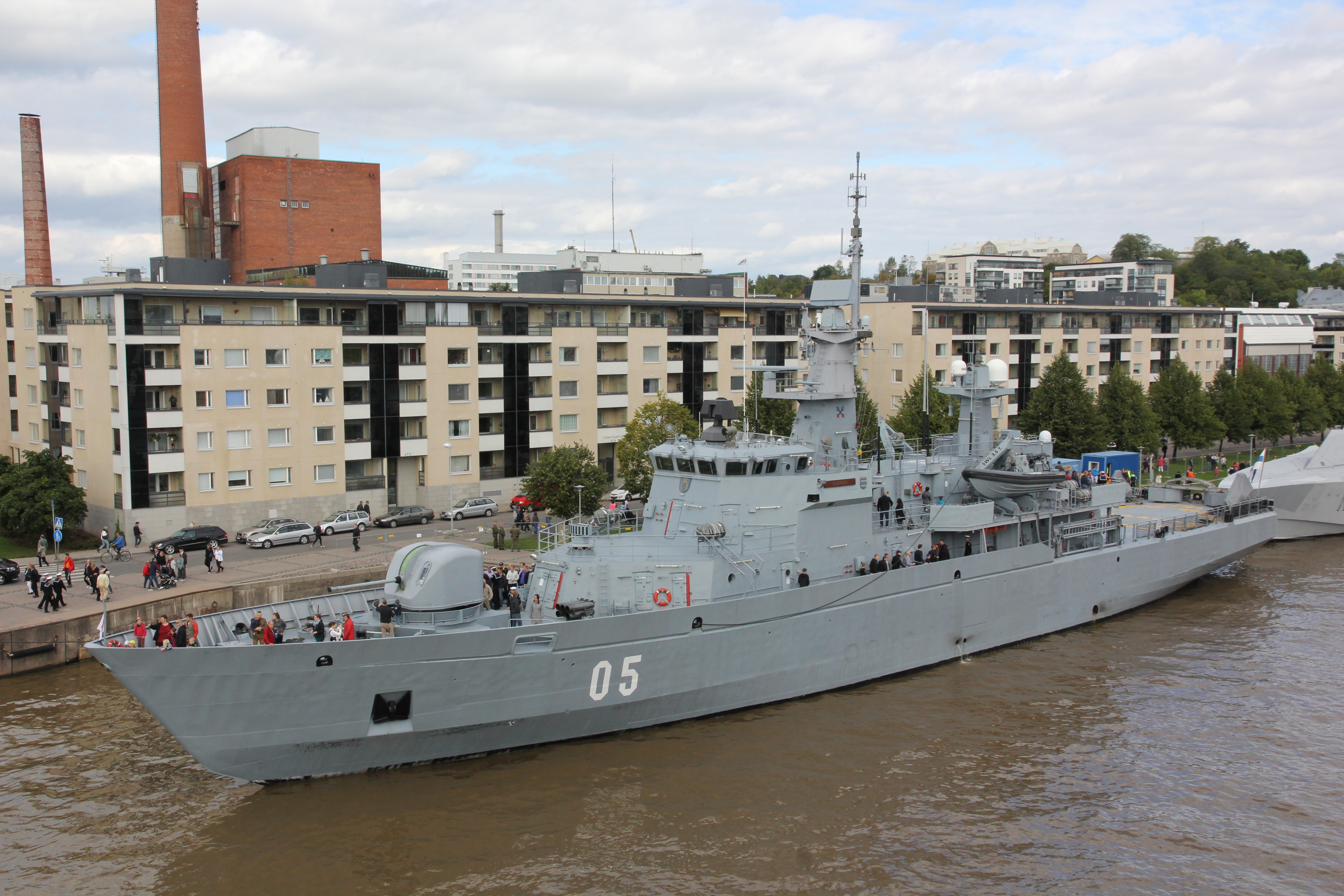
Hämeenmaa-class minelayer Uusimaa post-refit

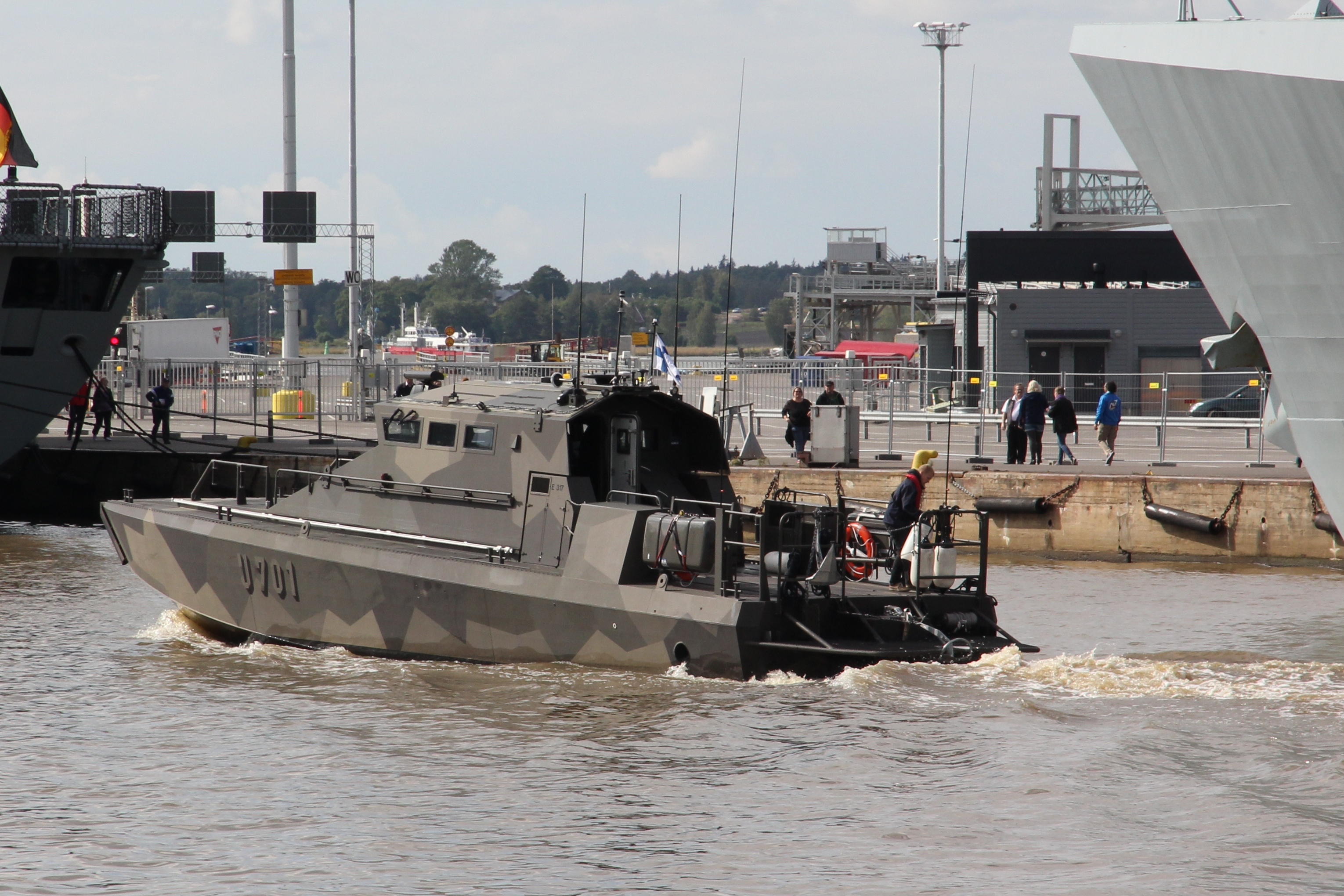
Jehu-class landing craft

=== Vessels ===
==== Fast attack craft ====
- Four Hamina-class fast attack craft
- Four Rauma-class fast attack craft

==== Mine warfare ====
- Two Hämeenmaa-class minelayers/escort ships
- Three Pansio-class minelayers
- Three Katanpää-class mine countermeasure vessels
- Four Kuha-class minesweepers
- Six Kiiski-class minesweepers

=== Coastal forces ===
The Finnish Navy's coastal forces consist of coastal infantry and marine units, known as the Coastal Jaegers, as well as coastal missile and surveillance units. Their primary role is to defend Finland’s territorial waters and archipelagos. Unlike many other European countries, Finland has retained certain coastal artillery systems in operational service. These include the 130 53 TK fixed turret guns, which continue to provide long-range coastal fire support.

The main weapon systems of the coastal forces include:

- Spike-ER coastal missile system (infantry-operated)
- MTO 85M anti-ship missile system (truck-mounted RBS-15 Mk.3)
- 130 53 TK coastal artillery (fixed turret-mounted naval guns)
- BOR-A 550 coastal surveillance radar

These systems are being supplemented by the new PTO2020 (Gabriel 5) missile system, which will gradually assume the primary coastal strike role.

== Ranks ==
=== Commissioned officer ranks ===
The rank insignia of commissioned officers.

NATO code	OF-10	OF-9	OF-8	OF-7	OF-6	OF-5	OF-4	OF-3	OF-2	OF-1
Finnish Navy
Finnish Navy		Amiraali	Vara-amiraali	Kontra-amiraali	Lippueamiraali	Kommodori	Komentaja	Komentajakapteeni	Kapteeniluutnantti	Yliluutnantti	Luutnantti	Aliluutnantti
Finnish Navy		Amiral	Viceamiral	Konteramiral	Flottiljamiral	Kommodor	Kommendör	Kommendörkapten	Kaptenlöjtnant	Premiärlöjtnant	Löjtnant	Underlöjtnant

=== Other ranks ===
The rank insignia of non-commissioned officers and enlisted personnel.

NATO code	OR-9	OR-8	OR-7	OR-6	OR-5	OR-4	OR-3	OR-2	OR-1
Finnish Navy
Finnish Navy	Sotilasmestari	Ylipursimies	Pursimies	Ylikersantti	Kersantti	Alikersantti	Ylimatruusi	Matruusi
Finnish Navy	Militärmästare	Överbåtsman	Båtsman	Översergeant	Sergeant	Undersergeant	Övermatros	Matros

== See also ==
- Finnish–Estonian defence cooperation
