= List of equipment of the Finnish Navy =

This is a list of equipment of the Finnish Navy. For equipment of the Finnish Army, see here.

== Ships ==
=== Combat vessels ===
Class	Image	Origin	Type	Quantity	Length / Displacement	Notes
Corvettes
Pohjanmaa-class corvette		Finland	Corvette	0 (+ 4 on order)	117 m (383 ft 10 in) / 4,300 t (4,200 long tons)	Weapons: SLWT and Torped 45 torpedoes launched from 2 × Saab Dynamics Tub m/20 launchers; 8 × 4 RIM-162 ESSM Block 2 (ITO 20) SAM launched from Mk 41 VLS (8-cell); 2 × 4 Gabriel V (PTO 2020) anti-ship missiles; 1 × Bofors 57 mm/70 SAK Mk3 (Bofors 3P ammo); 2 × Saab Trackfire; Stern rails for 100 × PB 17 naval mines; MASS (Soft-kill System)
Missile boats
Hamina-class missile boat		Finland	Missile boat	4	51 m (167 ft 4 in) / 250 t (250 long tons)	Mid-life upgrade between 2018 and 2023. Among the changes, new sensors, and new weapons: SLWT (TP 47) and Torped 45 (TP45) torpedoes launched from 1 × Saab Dynamics Tub m/20 launchers; 8 × Umkhonto Mk2 (ITO 04) SAM; 1 × 4 Gabriel V (PTO 20) anti-ship missiles; 1 × Bofors 40 Mk4; 1 × Saab Trackfire; 2 × M2 Browning (12.7 RSKK 2005); MASS (Soft-kill System)
Rauma-class missile boat		Finland	Missile boat	4	48.5 m (159 ft 1 in) / 210 t (210 long tons)	Weapons: 1 × Bofors 40 Mk2; 6 × RBS-15 SF III (MTO 85M); 2 × NSV (ITKK 96) machine guns; 2 × Elma ASW-600 (9-tune) ASW mortars; Rails for naval mines; MASS (Soft-kill System); Part of the 6th Surface Defense Squadron.
Minelayers
Hämeenmaa-class minelayer		Finland	Minelayer	2	77.8 m (255 ft 3 in) / 1,450 t (1,430 long tons)	Weapons: ≤ 150 × naval mines or depth charges (with rails); 1 × RBU-1200 depth charge rocket launchers; 1 × Bofors 57 Mk1; 8 × Umkhonto Mk2 (ITO 04) SAM; 1 × H&K GMG (40 KRKK 2005) grenade launcher; 1 × PKM (7.62 KK PKM) machine gun; Part of the 6th Surface Defense Squadron.
Pansio-class minelayer		Finland	Minelayer	3	43 m (141 ft 1 in) / 680 t (670 long tons)	Weapons: ≤ 50 × naval mines or depth charges.; 1 × Saab Trackfire armed with: 1 × H&K GMG (40 KRKK 2005) grenade launcher; 1 × PKM (7.62 KK PKM) machine gun; Part of the 6th Surface Defense Squadron and the 7th Anti-Surface Anti-Aircraft Squadron.
Minesweepers
Katanpää-class mine countermeasure vessel		Italy	Mine countermeasure vessel	3	52.5 m (172 ft 3 in) / 680 t (670 long tons)	Weapons: 1 × Bofors 40 Mk2 naval gun; Depth charges; Part of the 4th Mine Countermeasures Squadron.
Kuha-class minesweeper		Finland	Minesweeper	4	32 m (105 ft 0 in) / 150 t (150 long tons)	Six were built, two were decommissioned. Weapons: Sako 23 mm twin-barrelled anti-aircraft autocannons; NSV (ITKK 96) machine guns; Part of the 4th Mine Countermeasures Squadron.
Kiiski-class minesweeper		Finland	Minesweeper	6	16 m (52 ft 6 in) / 20 t (20 long tons)	Seven were built, one was decommissioned. Weapons: NSV (ITKK 96) machine guns; Part of the 4th Mine Countermeasures Squadron.
Transport / landing vessels
Jehu-class landing craft (U-700 / Watercat M18 AMC)		Finland	Landing craft	12	19.9 m (65 ft 3 in) / 32.2 t (31.7 long tons)	Transports up to 25 soldiers or 5.7 t (13,000 lb) of cargo. Weapons: Saab Trackfire; H&K GMG (40 KRKK 2005) automatic grenade launcher; PKM (7.62 KK PKM) coaxial machine gun; NSV (ITKK 96) machine gun; Used by the Coast Guard Units and the Uusimaa Brigade.
Jurmo-class landing craft (U-600 / Watercat M12)		Finland	Landing craft	55 (+18 on order)	14.2 m (46 ft 7 in) / 14 t (14 long tons)	38 were in service as of 2023, and 17 additional crafts were ordered in 2023. 18 new vessels were ordered in September 2026. Transports up to 20 soldiers or 3 t (6,600 lb) of cargo. Weapons: H&K GMG (40 KRKK 2005) automatic grenade launcher; NSV (ITKK 96) machine gun; Used by the Coast Guard Units and the Uusimaa Brigade.
Uisko-class landing craft (U-200, U-300, U-400 / Watercat M11)		Finland	Landing craft	>24	11 m (36 ft 1 in) / 10 t (9.8 long tons)	It is being decommissioned with at least 11 of the 35 watercraft purchased. Transports up to 2.5 t (5,500 lb) of cargo. Weapons: H&K GMG (40 KRKK 2005) automatic grenade launcher; 2 × NSV (ITKK 96) machine gun
G-class landing craft (G-100 / Watercat M8)		Finland	Landing craft	37	8.2 m (26 ft 11 in) / 2.1 t (2.1 long tons)	Transports up to 8 soldiers or 1 t (2,200 lb) of cargo. Used by the Coast Guard Units.
L-class landing craft		Finland	Landing craft	6	13 m (42 ft 8 in) / 14 t (14 long tons)	Of the 12 built, 6 were transferred over to National Defence Training Association (MPK).

=== Auxiliary vessels ===
Class	Image	Origin	Type	Quantity	Length / Displacement	Notes
Multirole vessels
Louhi-class pollution control vessel		Finland	Auxiliary ship	1	71.4 m (234 ft 3 in) / 2,200 t (2,200 long tons)	Primarily used for pollution control, also used for environmental accident fighting, cable laying and diver support vessels. Owned by Finnish Environment Institute, (manned and operated by Finnish Navy).
Halli-class pollution control vessel		Finland	Auxiliary ship	1	61.5 m (201 ft 9 in) / 2,100 t (2,100 long tons)	Primarily used for pollution control (YOR), also used for environmental accident fighting, cable laying and diver support vessels.
Hylje-class pollution control vessel		Finland	Auxiliary ship	1	54 m (177 ft 2 in) / 1,400 t (1,400 long tons)	Primarily used for pollution control (YOR), also used for environmental accident fighting, cable laying and diver support vessels. Owned by Finnish Environment Institute, (manned and operated by Finnish Navy).
Transport vessel
Hila-class transport vessel		Finland	Auxiliary transport vessel	4	15 m (49 ft 3 in) / 50 t (49 long tons)	Icebreaker capability in their transport role. Part of the Coastal Fleet.
Command vessels
Syöksy-class command support vessel		Finland	Battle group command support vessel	4	14 m (45 ft 11 in) / 19 t (19 long tons)	Weapons: NSV (ITKK 96) machine gun; Part of the Coastal Fleet.
Research vessels
Isku-class research vessel		Finland	Research vessel	1	33 m (108 ft 3 in) / 130 t (130 long tons)	Former experimental missile vessel, repurposed for research and test vessels. Weapons: NSV (ITKK 96) machine gun; Rails for naval mines; Part of the Coastal Fleet.
Cable layers
K410-class cable layer		Finland	Cable layer	2	20 m (65 ft 7 in) / 35 t (34 long tons)	Used to lay cables for command and communications system, and also used in maintenance work.
Tugboats
Haukipää-class tugboat		Finland	Tugboat	2	14 m (45 ft 11 in) / 50 t (49 long tons)	
Training ships
Fabian Wrede-class training ship		Finland	Training ship	3	19.6 m (64 ft 4 in) / 65 t (64 long tons)	Part of the Naval Academy.

== Naval weapons and equipment ==
Model	Finnish designation	Image	Origin	Type	Quantity	Used with	Notes
Torpedoes
Torped 45	TP 45	—	Sweden	Lightweight torpedo (400 mm)	—	Hamina class	Torpedo introduced in service in 2020 with the MLU of the Hamina-class, and will be used with the Pohjanmaa-class in the future. Launched from the Saab Dynamics Tub m/20, compatible with the TP 45 and TP 47.: 1 × Tub m/20 launcher; 2 × Tub m/20 launchers
Torped 45	TP 45	—	Sweden	Lightweight torpedo (400 mm)	—	Pohjanmaa class	Torpedo introduced in service in 2020 with the MLU of the Hamina-class, and will be used with the Pohjanmaa-class in the future. Launched from the Saab Dynamics Tub m/20, compatible with the TP 45 and TP 47.: 1 × Tub m/20 launcher; 2 × Tub m/20 launchers
SLWT Saab Lightweight Torpedo	TP 47	—	Sweden	Lightweight torpedo (400 mm)	—	Hamina class	Torpedo introduced in service in 2020 with the MLU of the Hamina-class, and will be used with the Pohjanmaa-class in the future. Launched from the Saab Dynamics Tub m/20, compatible with the TP 45 and TP 47.: 1 × Tub m/20 launcher; 2 × Tub m/20 launchers
SLWT Saab Lightweight Torpedo	TP 47	—	Sweden	Lightweight torpedo (400 mm)	—	Pohjanmaa class	Torpedo introduced in service in 2020 with the MLU of the Hamina-class, and will be used with the Pohjanmaa-class in the future. Launched from the Saab Dynamics Tub m/20, compatible with the TP 45 and TP 47.: 1 × Tub m/20 launcher; 2 × Tub m/20 launchers
Surface-to-air missiles
RIM-162 ESSM Block 2	ITO 20		United States	Surface-to-air missile (short range)	—	Pohjanmaa-class corvette	Missile to be used when the Pohjanmaa-class enters service. Launched from an 8-cell Mk 41 VLS, with a quadpack in each cell, for a total of 32 missiles per ship.
Umkhonto Mk2	ITO 04		South Africa	Surface-to-air missile (short range)	—	Hamina class	Individual cells for each missiles, 8 × vertical cells per ship. Missile guided by IR.
Umkhonto Mk2	ITO 04		South Africa	Surface-to-air missile (short range)	—	Hämeenmaa class	Individual cells for each missiles, 8 × vertical cells per ship. Missile guided by IR.
Anti-ship missiles
Gabriel V	PTO 2020	(side launcher - image center)	Israel	Anti-ship cruise missile	—	Hamina class	The missile was selected in 2018. It became operational in August 2025 with the Hamina class (4 × per ship). It will enter service with the Pohjanmaa class (2 × 4 per ship).
Gabriel V	PTO 2020	(side launcher - image center)	Israel	Anti-ship cruise missile	—	Pohjanmaa class	The missile was selected in 2018. It became operational in August 2025 with the Hamina class (4 × per ship). It will enter service with the Pohjanmaa class (2 × 4 per ship).
RBS-15 SF III	MTO 85M		Sweden	Anti-ship cruise missile	—	Rauma class	RBS 15 Mk2 (MTO 85) upgraded to the SF III standard (not Mk III) in the early 2000s, and other purchased new. Not used anymore with the Hamina class.
Naval guns
Bofors 57 Mk 1	—		Sweden	Naval gun (57 × 438 mmR)	2 (1 × per ship)	Hämeenmaa class	
Bofors 57 Mk 3	—		Sweden	Naval gun (57 × 438 mmR)	4 (1 × per ship)	Pohjanmaa class	Recycled guns from the Hamina class. It uses Bofors 3P ammo.
Bofors 40 Mk 2	—		Sweden	Naval gun (40 × 365 mm)	7 (1 × per ship)	Rauma class	Used on two classes.
Bofors 40 Mk 2	—		Sweden	Naval gun (40 × 365 mm)	7 (1 × per ship)	Katanpää class	Used on two classes.
Bofors 40 Mk 4	—		Sweden	Naval gun (40 × 365 mm)	4 (1 × per ship)	Hamina class	The class was using the Bofors 57 Mk 3 prior to being modernised. Those will be used on the Pohjanmaa-class. And they were replaced with the Bofors 40 Mk 4.
Sako 23 mm/87	23 M85		Finland	Anti-air twin cannon (23 x 152 mmB)	4 (1 × per ship)	Kuha class	
Remote weapon stations
Saab Trackfire	—		Sweden	RCWS Remote controlled weapon station	8 (2 × per ship)	Pohjanmaa class	Selected in 2012 for the Navy. Primary weapon: 1 × NSV (ITKK 96), or; 1 × H&K GMG (40 KRKK 2005); Coaxial weapon: 1 × PKM (7.62 KK PKM) machine gun
Saab Trackfire	—		Sweden	RCWS Remote controlled weapon station	4 (1 × per ship)	Hamina class	Selected in 2012 for the Navy. Primary weapon: 1 × NSV (ITKK 96), or; 1 × H&K GMG (40 KRKK 2005); Coaxial weapon: 1 × PKM (7.62 KK PKM) machine gun
Saab Trackfire	—		Sweden	RCWS Remote controlled weapon station	3 (1 × per ship)	Pansio class	Selected in 2012 for the Navy. Primary weapon: 1 × NSV (ITKK 96), or; 1 × H&K GMG (40 KRKK 2005); Coaxial weapon: 1 × PKM (7.62 KK PKM) machine gun
Saab Trackfire	—		Sweden	RCWS Remote controlled weapon station	12 (1 × per ship)	Jehu class	Selected in 2012 for the Navy. Primary weapon: 1 × NSV (ITKK 96), or; 1 × H&K GMG (40 KRKK 2005); Coaxial weapon: 1 × PKM (7.62 KK PKM) machine gun
ASW mortars
Elma ASW-601	—		Sweden	ASW mortars	8 (2 × per ship)	Rauma-class missile boat	2 × 9 ASW mortars ready to fire on each ship.
Depth charges
RBU-1200 ASROC	RGB 12		Soviet Union	Depth charge rocket	4 (2 × per ship)	Hämeenmaa class	2 × 5 ASROC launchers ready to fire per ship.
Naval mines
—	S 43-55		Finland	Naval mines (contact mine)	—	Minelaying capable ships	Kept in the reserve.
—	S 58		Finland	Naval mines (contact mine)	—	Minelaying capable ships	Kept in the reserve.
—	PM 83-1 PM 83-2	—	Soviet Union	Naval mine (bottom-influence sea mine)	—	Minelaying capable ships	a
Stonefish	PM 85S	—	United Kingdom	Naval mine 650 kg (1,430 lb)	—	Minelaying capable ships	Acoustic and magnetic mine, with pressure-influence settings.
Stonefish	PM 85R	—	United Kingdom	Naval mine 760 kg (1,680 lb)	—	Minelaying capable ships	Acoustic and magnetic mine, with pressure-influence settings.
Stonefish	PM 85E	—	United Kingdom	Naval mine 950 kg (2,090 lb)	—	Minelaying capable ships	Acoustic and magnetic mine, with pressure-influence settings.
—	PM 90 PM 90 MOD	—	Finland	Naval mine (bottom-influence sea mine)	—	Minelaying capable ships	
—	RM 94 (Rannikkomiina)	—	Finland	Coastal mine	—	Minelaying capable ships	
—	PM 98	—	Russia	Naval mine (bottom-influence sea mine)	—	Minelaying capable ships	System made of two older naval mines and electronic systems.
Merimiina 2000	PM 04		Finland	Naval mines	—	Minelaying capable ships	Used from
Blocker (From Forcit / TDW)	PM 16		Finland Germany	Naval mine (bottom-influence sea mine)	—	Minelaying capable ships (and helicopters)	Used from all minelaying capable ships. European purchase framework in 2026.
Naval drones
Double Eagle Mk III	—		Sweden	Mine disposal vehicle UUV (Unmanned underwater vehicles)	—	Minesweeper, mine countermeasure vessel, and multirole vessels	Supplied by Saab Underwater Systems.
SeaFox Combat	—		Germany	Mine reconnaissance vehicle UUV (Unmanned underwater vehicles)	—	Minesweeper, mine countermeasure vessel, and multirole vessels	Supplied by Atlas Elektronik.
SeaFox I	—		Germany	Mine reconnaissance vehicle UUV (Unmanned underwater vehicles)	—	Minesweeper, mine countermeasure vessel, and multirole vessels	Supplied by Atlas Elektronik.

Note: the small arms are not individually listed in this table.

== Coastal defence ==
=== Coastal artillery ===
Model	Finnish designation	Image	Origin	Type	Quantity	Notes
Anti-ship missile fire unit
RBS 15 SF III	MTO 85M		Sweden Finland	Coastal anti-ship cruise missile	—	It's an anti-ship missile launcher equipped with 4 × RBS 15 SF III. The launchers are mounted on Sisu SK242 trucks.
RBS 15 SF III command post	MTO 85M		Sweden	Anti-ship missile command post	—	The command post supplied by Saab is mounted on a Scania R470 truck.
Coastal guns
Tampella 130TK	130 53 TK		Finland	Coastal medium gun (130 mm L/53)	15	Range: Unassisted: 27 km (17 mi); Assisted:40 km (25 mi)
RTA 2776	—	—	Norway Finland	Artillery shells (130 mm)	—	130 mm naval armour piercing base bleed shell for 130 53 TK
Mobile coastal artillery	—		—	Mobile coastal artillery system (155 mm L/52)	—	Finland is looking for a successor to its current system. Finland is looking for a wheeled system. The options include: Patria ARVE (155 K 98 gun on the SISU E13TP); KNDS France CaESAr Mk2

=== Coastal infantry ===
Model	Finnish designation	Image	Origin	Type	Quantity	Notes
Coastal anti-watercraft missile
Spike ER	PO 06		Israel (design) Germany (licence production)	Anti-tank and anti-watercraft missiles	400	Range: 8 km (5.0 mi)
Spike ER2	—		Israel (design) Germany (licence production)	Anti-tank and anti-watercraft missiles	—	Range: 10 km (6.2 mi). Ordered with other variants of the missile for the Finnish Army.
Coastal surveillance radar
BOR-A 550	—		Germany	X band (IEEE), pulse-doppler, man-portable, coastal surveillance	26	Range: 60 km (37 mi) Purchased in March 2003. Developed and made by the German subsidiary of the Thales group. Upgraded in 2016, to be used until 2035.

Note: the Finnish Coastal Jaegers belong to the Navy, but they have access to the same weapons as the Army, except for some specialised equipment related to the anti-ship role. For the other equipment, see the page List of equipment of the Finnish Army#Infantry weapons.

== Land vehicles of the Coastal Forces ==
The Finnish Coastal Jaegers unit is a part of the Navy, but they have access to the same vehicles as the Army.

== See also ==
- List of active Finnish Navy ships
- List of decommissioned ships of the Finnish Navy
- List of equipment of the Finnish Army
- List of former equipment of the Finnish Army
