= Coastal Fleet (Finland) =

- Rannikkolaivasto; Kustflottan
- Distinctive unit insignia of the Coastal Fleet
- Active: 2015 – Present
- Country: Finland
- Branch: Finnish Navy
- Garrisons: Pansio, Turku; Upinniemi, Kirkkonummi
- Colors
- Website: https://merivoimat.fi/en/coastal-fleet

The Coastal Fleet of the Finnish Navy (Finnish: Rannikkolaivasto; Swedish: Kustflottan) is the main naval fleet in the Finnish Navy. It is responsible for securing the territorial integrity of Finland and its territorial waters. Almost all of Finland's naval vessels are part of the Coastal Fleet.

== Units ==
| Unit | Divisions | Ships | Notes | Ref |
|---|---|---|---|---|
| Headquarters | | | Located in Pansio | |
| 4th Mine Countermeasures Squadron | | Katanpää-class mine countermeasure vessels, Kuha and Kiiski-class minesweepers | Stationed at Pansio naval base | |
| 6th Surface Warfare Squadron | 2nd Mine Division, 2nd Missile Division | Rauma-class missile boats, Hämeenmaa-class minelayer, Pansio-class minelayer | Stationed at Pansio naval base | |
| 7th Surface Warface Squadron | MLC Hämeenmaa, 1st Mine Division, 1st Missile Division | Hamina-class missile boats, Hämeenmaa-class minelayer, Pansio-class minelayers | Stationed at Upinniemi naval base | |
| 8th Service Support Squadron | 1st Transport Division, 2nd Transport Division | Pollution control vessels Hylje, Halli and Louhi, Various transport ships | Also includes a support company of the Pansio garrison (logistics, military police) | |
