= Finnish minelayer Pyhäranta =

Finnish minelayer

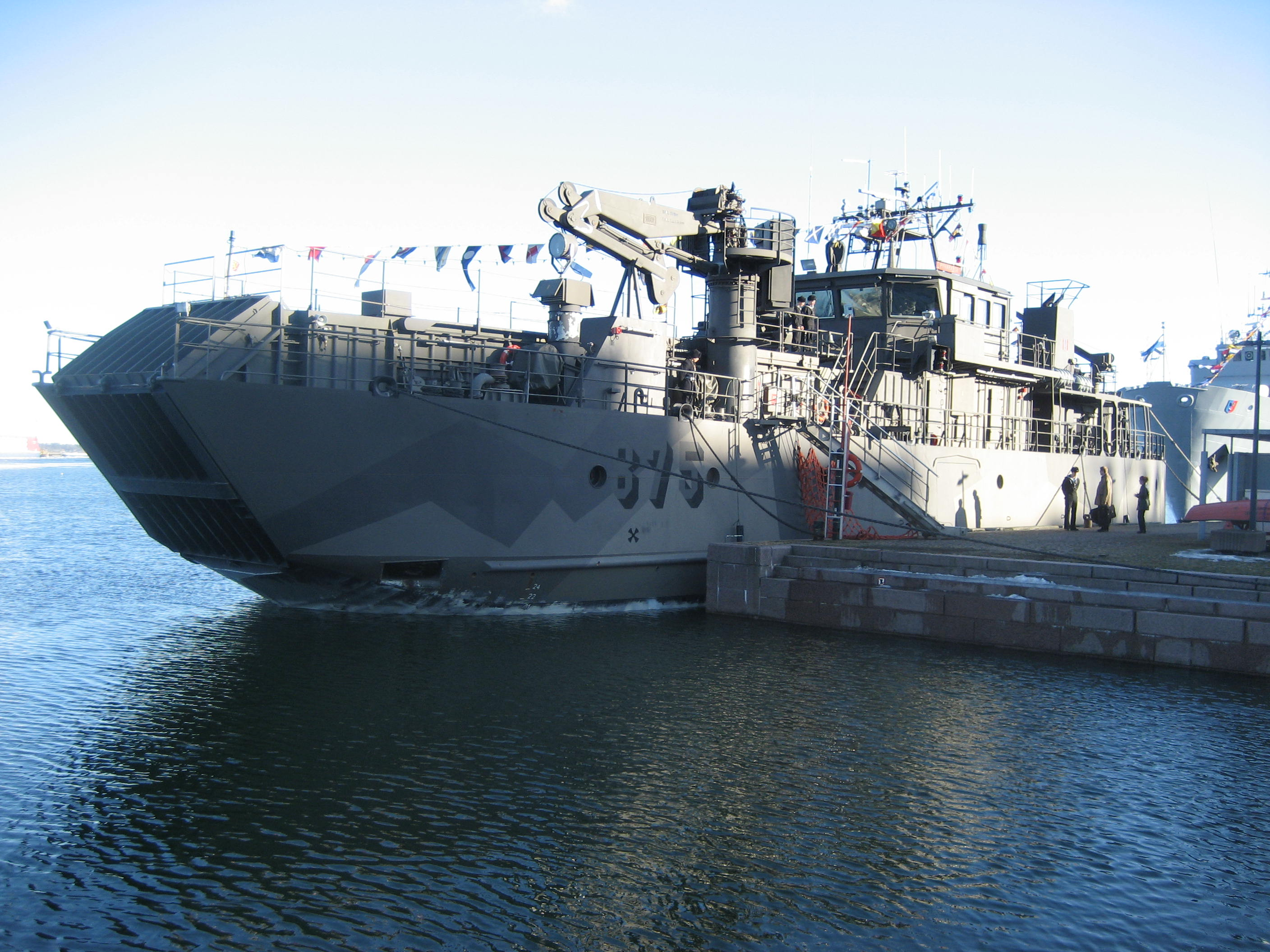
- Pyhäranta in Helsinki harbor in March 2007

History

Finnish Navy
- Name: Pyhäranta
- Namesake: Pyhäranta
- Ordered: May 1990
- Builder: Olkiluoto shipyard
- Yard number: 92
- Commissioned: 26 April 1992

General characteristics
- Class & type: Pansio-class minelayer
- Displacement: 680 tons
- Length: 43 m (141 ft 1 in)
- Beam: 10 m (32 ft 10 in)
- Draft: 2 m (6 ft 7 in)
- Propulsion: 2 × diesel engines; 1,100 kW (1,500 hp)
- Speed: 11 knots (20 km/h; 13 mph)
- Crew: 19
- Armament: 1 × Saab Trackfire RWS (1 × 7.62 mm PKM machine gun and 1 × 40 mm H&K GMG); 1 × 12.7 mm NSV; 50 mines (Sea Mine 2000)

Pyhäranta is a Finnish Pansio-class minelayer that was commissioned in 1992. The ship underwent an extensive mid-life refit in 2017, but ran aground and damaged its hull during an exercise in August 2022. At that time, it was based at Upinniemi and was a part of the 7th Surface Warfare Squadron of the Finnish Coastal Fleet along with the other minelayers Hämeenmaa and Porkkala, as well as several Hamina-class fast attack craft.

== Description ==
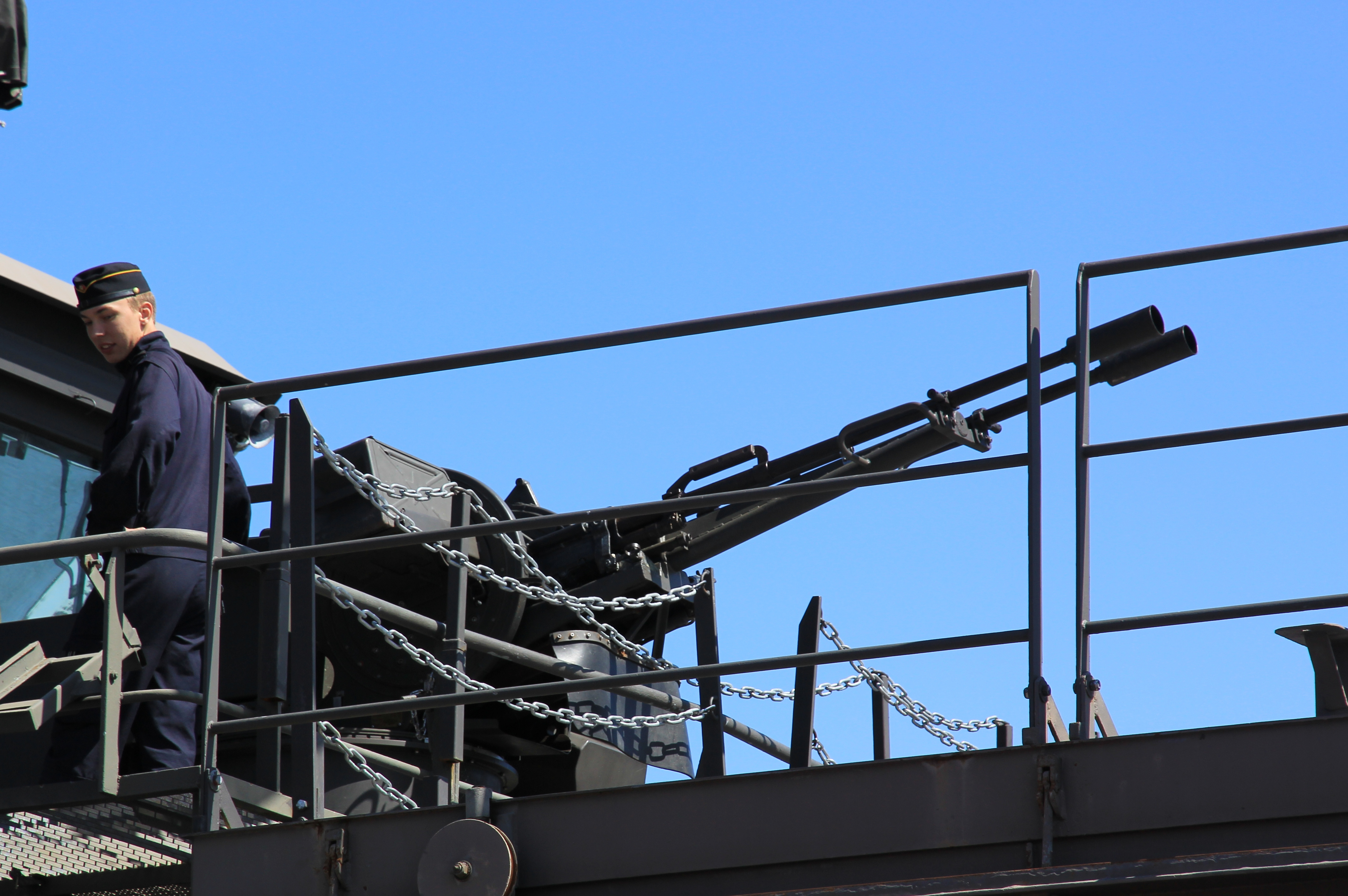
One of Pyhäranta's anti-aircraft guns

The ship has a displacement of 450 tons. It has an overall length of 44 meters, a width of 10 meters, and a draft of 2 meters. Pyhäranta is powered by two diesel engines and two propellers for 1500 horsepower and a maximum speed of 10 knots. It is armed with two .60 caliber Sako anti-aircraft guns and a single 12.7 mm machine gun. 50 naval mines are on board and there are 100 meters of minelaying rails along the deck. Additionally, it has a 15-ton electrohydraulic crane forward and a 1.2-ton crane to the rear, and its hull is capable of light icebreaking. The ship can also embark two trucks from its bow or stern ramps.

== History ==
The Finnish Navy placed an order for Pyhäranta and the other two Pansio-class ships, Pansio and Porkkala, from the Olkiluoto Shipyard in May 1990. The ship was commissioned on 26 April 1992 as a multi-role ship; it was intended to act as a minelayer, pollution control ship, landing ship, and supply ship for Coastal Artillery installations.

In May 2015, Atlas Elektronik Finland received a contract to perform a mid-life refit of all three Pansio-class minelayers. Pyhäranta was updated at the Uki Workboat shipyard, receiving new systems and minelaying equipment, as well as maintenance of all old systems. It was the last of the three ships in the refit to be completed, and was handed over to the navy in December 2017.

=== Grounding ===
On 24 August 2022, Pyhäranta was participating in live fire exercises with the Coastal Fleet, towing a floating target device behind. While retrieving the device, the ship ran aground off the island Örö. The grounding led to minor damage of the ship's bow, as well as some flooding in the front of the ship. However, the crew was able to contain the damage, and no oil or other environmental contaminants were leaked. The crew was moved to another ship for safety reasons, and the ship was inspected by navy divers in preparation for freeing it from the seabed. Additionally, the Border Guard oil spill response vessel Halli and offshore patrol craft Tursas were dispatched to monitor the ship for any environmental risks.
