= Hamina-class missile boat =

Fast attack craft class of the Finnish Navy

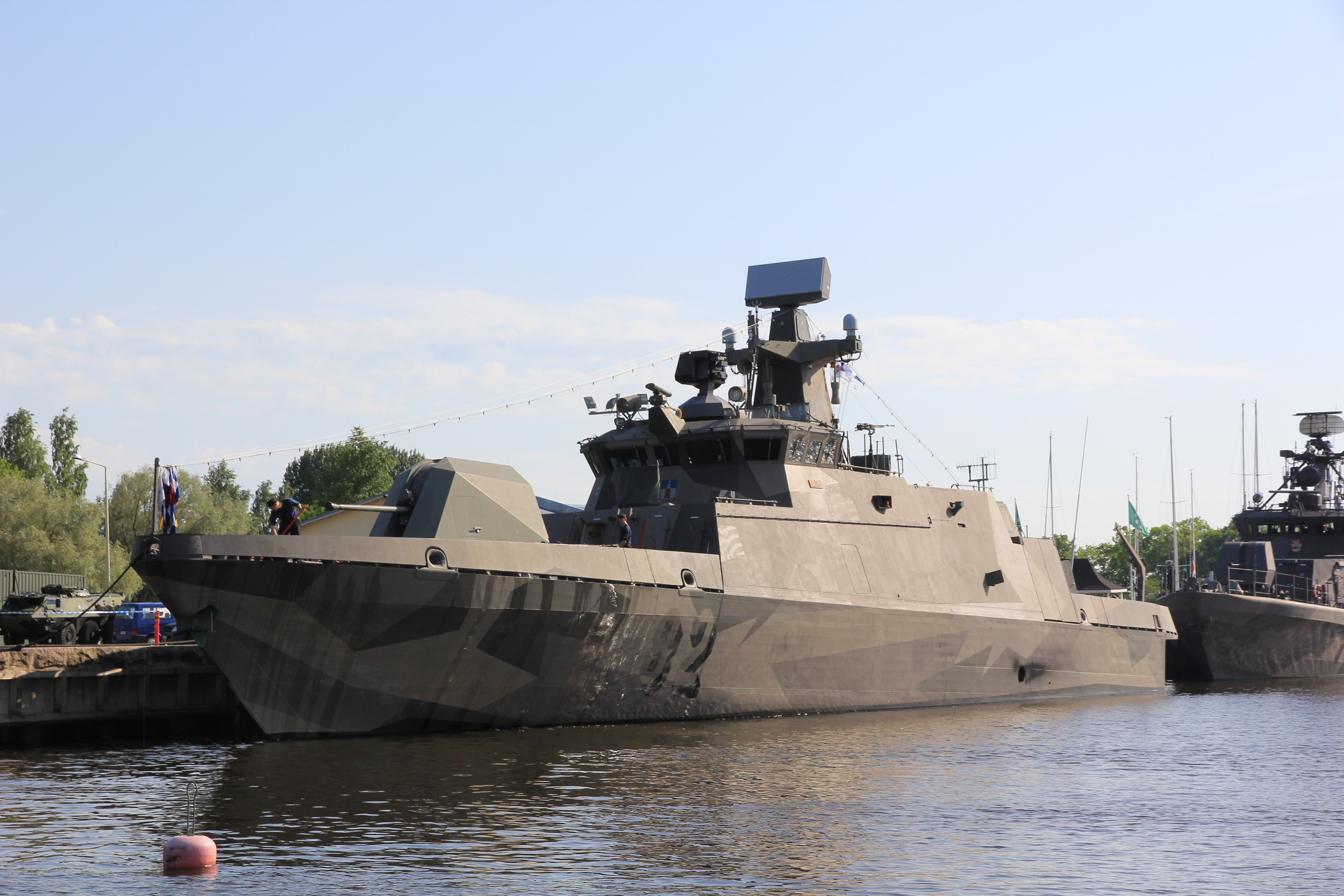
- FNS Hanko (82)

Class overview
- Name: Hamina
- Builders: Aker Finnyards
- Operators: Finnish Navy
- Preceded by: Rauma class
- Built: 1996-2006
- In commission: 1998-present
- Completed: 4
- Active: 4

General characteristics
- Type: Fast attack craft
- Displacement: 250 tons
- Length: 51 m (167 ft)
- Beam: 8.5 m (28 ft)
- Draught: 1.7 m (5 ft 7 in)
- Propulsion: 2 × MTU 16V 538 TB93 diesels; 5520 kW.; 2 × Rolls-Royce Kamewa 90SII waterjets
- Speed: Over 30 knots (56 km/h; 35 mph)
- Range: 500 nmi (930 km; 580 mi)
- Complement: 26
- Sensors & processing systems: Saab Ceros 200 with 9LV FCS (Saab); Consilium Selesmar maritime radar; TRS-3D/16-ES multimode acquisition 3D radar (EADS); ANCS 2000 Combat Management System (EADS); MSSR 2000 I IFF (EADS); EOMS (SAGEM); Simrad Subsea Toadfish sonar; Sonac/PTA towed array sonar (Finnyards)
- Electronic warfare & decoys: MASS (Multi Ammunition Soft-kill System) (Rheinmetall); Decoys: Philax chaff, IR flares; Smoke system: Lacroix ATOS; EMS: Matilda radar warning receiver (Thales)
- Armament: 1 × Bofors 40 Mk4; 2 × 12.7 mm machine guns (NSV); 8 × Umkhonto-IR SAM (Denel); 4 × Gabriel Mk.5 SSM (Israel Aerospace Industries); 1 × rail for depth charges or mines (Sea Mine 2000); Torped 47; Saab Trackfire

The Hamina-class missile boat is a class of fast attack craft of the Finnish Navy. They are classified as "missile fast attack craft" or ohjusvene, literally "missile boat" in Finnish. All four Hamina-class boats—Hamina, Tornio, Hanko, and Pori—are based at Upinniemi. Together, they form the 7th Surface Warfare Squadron, part of the Finnish Coastal Fleet, alongside the minelayers MLC Hämeenmaa, MLI Porkkala, and MLI Pyhäranta. The 6th Surface Warfare Squadron is based in Pansio and includes the minelayers MLC Uusimaa and MLI Pansio.

== History ==
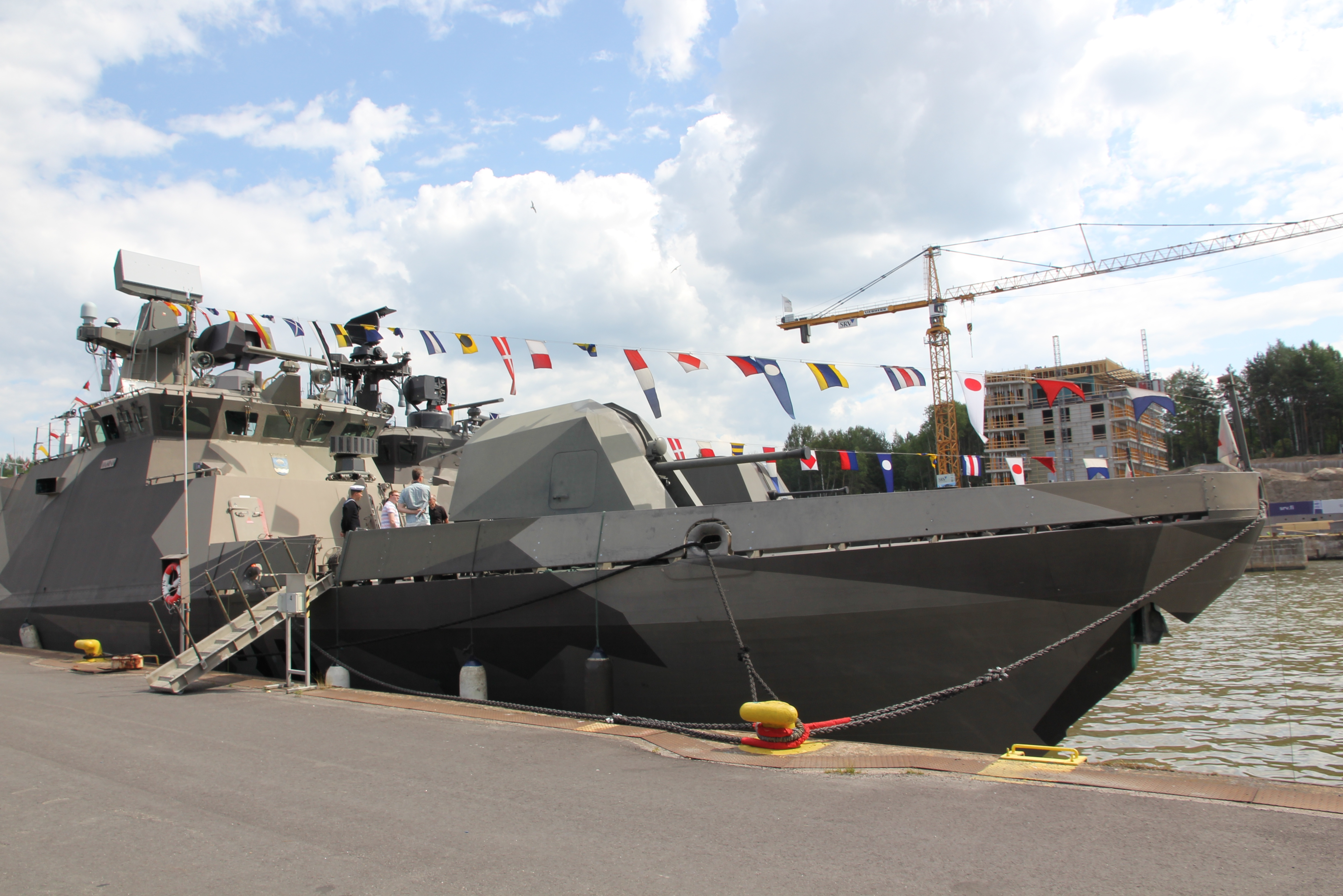
Hamina (80)

The vessels were built in the late 1990s, early 2000s, and are the fourth generation of Finnish missile craft. The first vessel was ordered in December 1996 and the fourth was handed over on 19 June 2006. Since the launch of the Helsinki-class missile boats, all fast attack craft have been named after Finnish coastal cities. The class was previously known also as Rauma 2000 following its predecessor the Rauma class.

The four vessels form what the Finnish Navy calls Squadron 2000 (Finnish: Laivue 2000). Initially the Finnish Navy considered several different compositions for the new squadron, and at one point only two Hamina-class vessels and four Tuuli-class ACV were to have been built. After a strategic shift of the Finnish Navy's role, the composition of the Squadron 2000 followed suit. The Tuuli-class prototype was never fully equipped, nor fitted for operational use and its three sisters were cancelled, instead two more Hamina-class boats have been built; with some of the equipment intended for the Tuulis being used in the Haminas. The fourth and final Hamina-class vessel was delivered in summer 2006.

The squadron reached its full operational capability in 2008 and have greatly improved the surface- and air surveillance as well as air defense capability of the Finnish Navy. Their electronic surveillance suite also increases the quality of information available to military leaders.

All ships were built at Rauma shipyard by Aker Finnyards in Rauma, Finland. The vessels have their home base at Upinniemi.

In March 2014 it was announced that the Hamina-class missile boats will be upgraded in the near future.

In late 2024 Finnish Navy published plans to contribute one FAC to the SNMG1 for up to one month. It was later announced in January 2025 that FNS Pori of the Hamina-class would be part of the Standing NATO Maritime Group 1 task force, during which time SNMG1 would be conducting operations for securing underwater infrastructure in the Baltic Sea.

== Mid-life update ==
Modernization of the four Hamina-class ships began in 2018 and was completed in April 2022, The MLU programme will enable the Haminas to continue their service into the mid 2030's.

The main gun armament is being changed from 57mm to 40mm in order to save weight. The vessels were already at maximum weight and in order to introduce torpedoes this had to be changed.

Weaponry
Original	After modernization
1 × Bofors 57 mm dual-purpose gun (transferred to Pohjanmaa class)	1 × Bofors 40 Mk4 multi purpose gun
2 × 12,7mm machine guns	1 × Saab Trackfire remote weapon station with a 12,7mm machine gun, 2 × 12,7mm machine guns
none	Initially Torped 45, later Torped 47
RBS15 SFIII anti-ship missile	Gabriel Mk.5 anti-ship missile
Atlas ANCS 2000 combat system	Saab 9LV combat management system
none	Kongsberg ST2400 towed sonar (from Rauma class)
Saab Ceros 200 radar and optronic tracking fire control director	updated Saab Ceros 200 radar and optronic tracking fire control director
TRS-3D phased array C-band radar	updated TRS-3D phased array C-band radar

== Design ==
The vessel's hull is constructed of aluminum and the superstructures are constructed of reinforced carbon fiber composite. The vessels have a very low displacement and are very manoeuverable. They are equipped with water jets instead of propellers, which allow them to operate in very shallow waters and accelerate, slow down and turn in unconventional ways.

The Hamina class are very potent vessels, boasting surveillance and firepower capacities which are usually found in ships twice the size.

=== Stealth technology ===
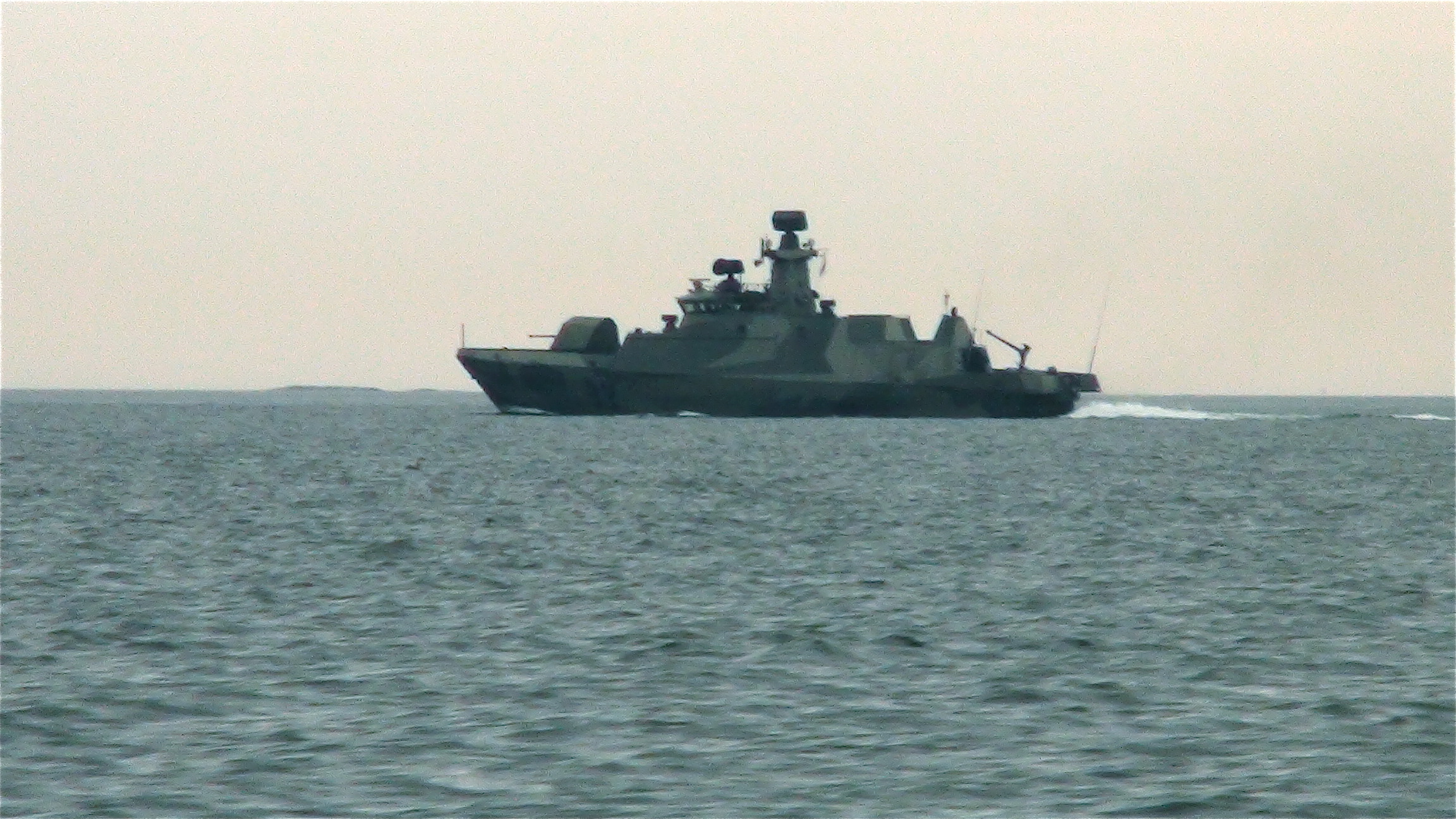
Hanko, photographed in the Gulf of Finland in 2009

The Hamina class have been designed and constructed as stealth ships, with minimal magnetic, heat, and radar signatures.

The shape of the vessel has been designed to reduce radar signature. Metal parts have been covered with radar absorbent material, and the composite parts have radar absorbent material embedded in their structure. Radar transparent materials have been used where applicable.

Unlike glass fiber, carbon fiber blocks radio waves. This protects the ship's electronics against electromagnetic pulse. In addition, it stops any radio frequency signals generated by the ship's electronic devices from escaping outside. Except for the bridge, the vessel has no windows that would allow the signals to escape.

The vessel contains hardly any steel parts, thus generating very low magnetic field. The remaining magnetic field is actively canceled with electromagnets.

Exhaust gases can be directed underwater to minimize the thermal signature, or up in the air to minimize the underwater acoustic signature. 50 nozzles around the decks and upper structures can be used to spray seawater on the vessel to cool it. In addition, the nozzles can be used to clean the ship after chemical attack or radioactive fall-out.

=== Weapons ===
The Hamina class have the latest in surveillance and weapons technology all integrated into an intelligent command system. A Hamina class vessel can monitor about 200 kilometres (120 mi) of air space and its Umkhonto surface-to-air missile system can simultaneously engage a maximum of eight aircraft, up to 14 kilometres (8.7 mi) away, while the vessel's anti-ship missiles have a range in excess of 250 kilometres (160 mi).

The Hamina class' primary weaponry is four Gabriel Mk.5 surface-to-surface missiles. They are further equipped with a Bofors 40mm gun for surface and aerial targets as well as the Umkhonto-IR surface-to-air missiles, MASS decoy system and two 12.7 mm heavy machine guns. It is also possible to use the ships for minelaying.

The software of the centralized combat control system is COTS oriented, built on top of Linux running on redundant x86 rack servers, which makes maintenance and future updates and optimizations simpler.

In early 2018, Finland announced the mid-life upgrade program, which will equip all four boats in the class with new Swedish lightweight anti-submarine warfare torpedoes in the years 2023−2025 and extend the life of the boats to 2035.

== Vessels ==
FNS Hamina
Pennant number: 80
Builder: Aker Finnyards
Ordered: December 1996
Commissioned: 24 August 1998
Home base: Pansio
Current status: In active service.
FNS Tornio

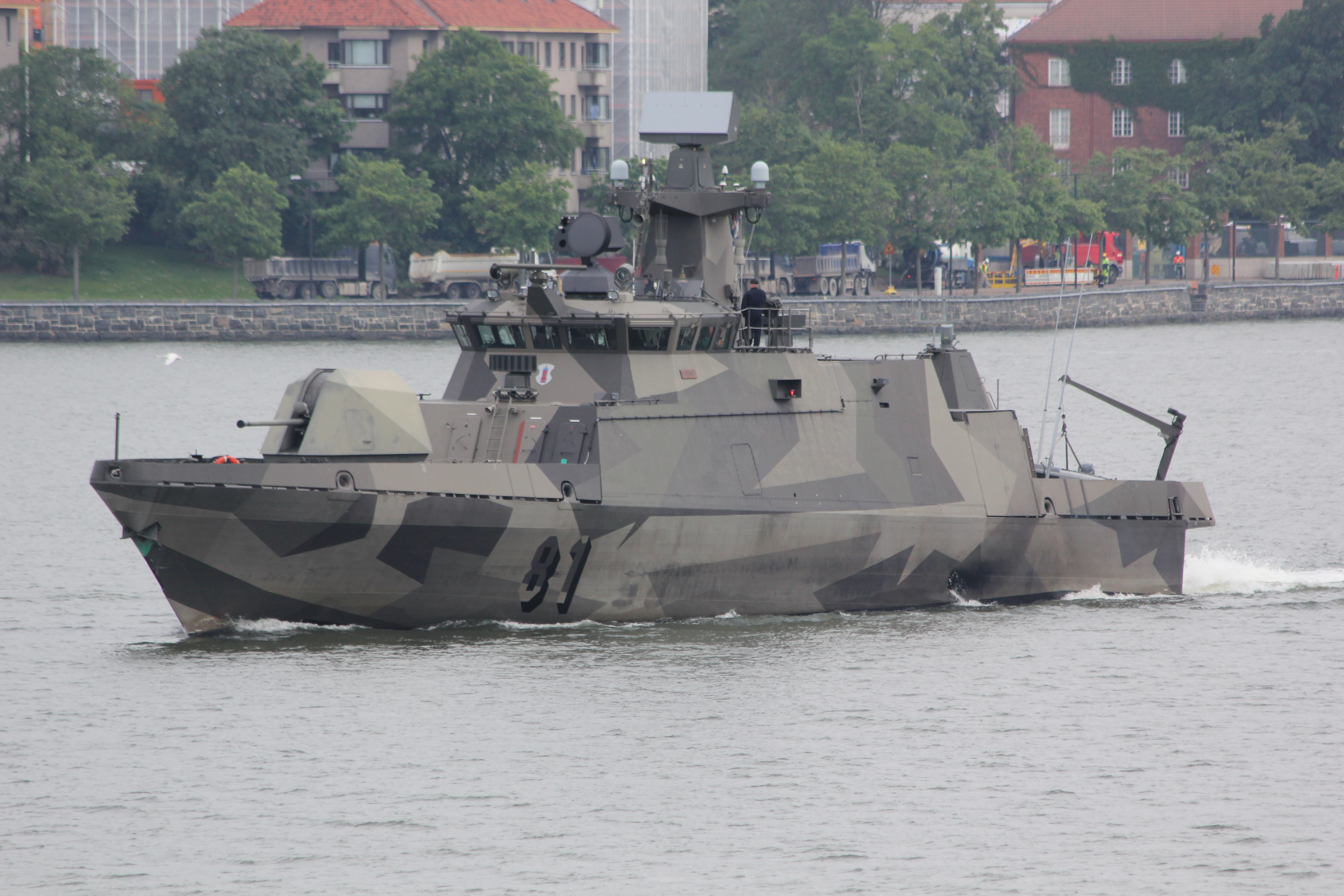
Tornio (81)

Pennant number: 81
Builder: Aker Finnyards
Ordered: 15 February 2001
Commissioned: 12 May 2003
Home base: Upinniemi
Current status: In active service
FNS Hanko
Pennant number: 82
Builder: Aker Finnyards
Ordered: 3 December 2003
Commissioned: 22 June 2005
Home base: Pansio
Current status: In active service

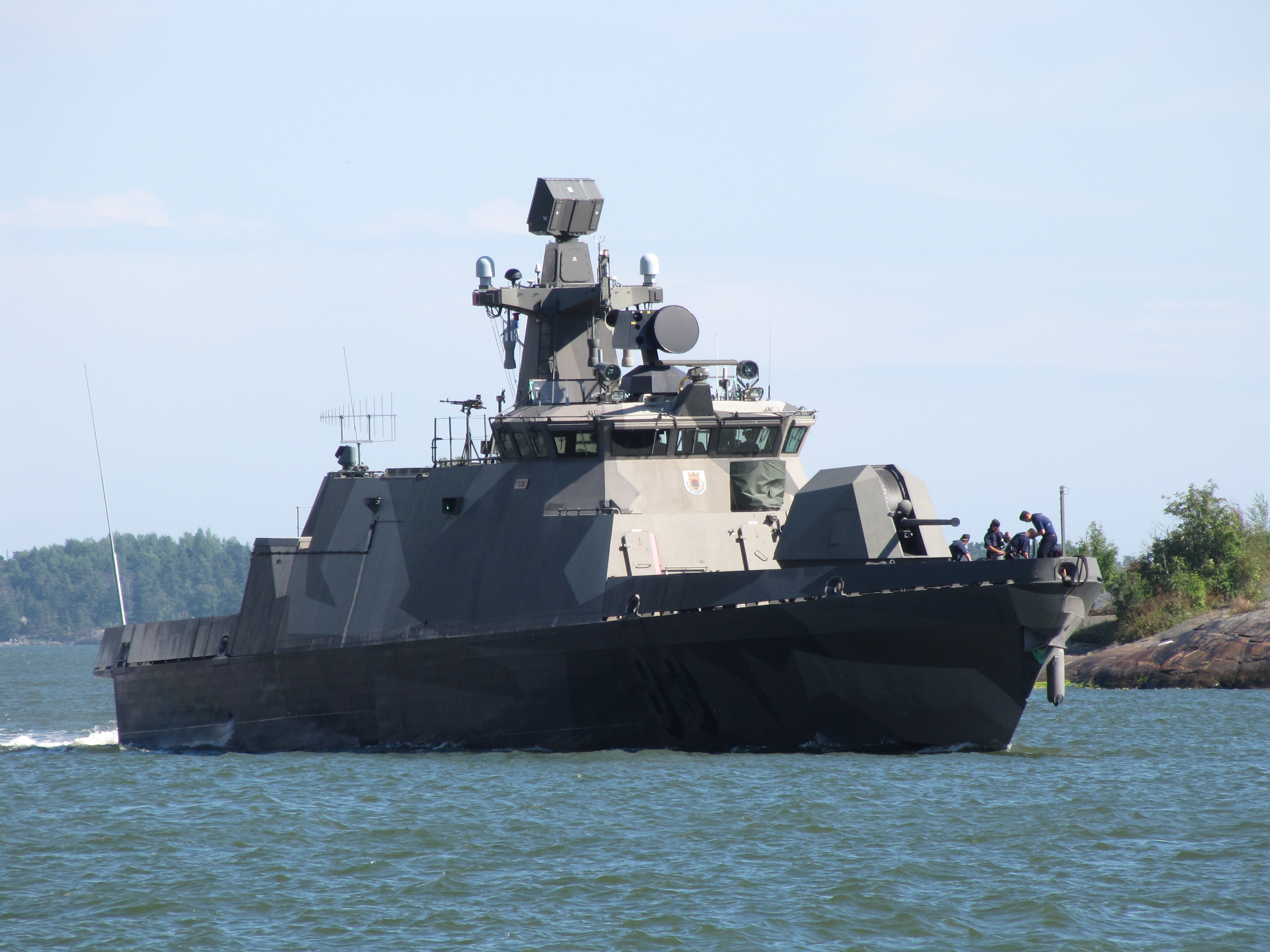
Pori (83)

FNS Pori
Pennant number: 83
Builder: Aker Finnyards
Ordered: 15 February 2005
Commissioned: 19 June 2006
Home base: Upinniemi
Current status: In active service

== Similar ships ==
- Houbei-class missile boat
- Skjold-class corvette
- Roussen-class fast attack craft
