= Rauma-class missile boat =

Finnish missile boat class

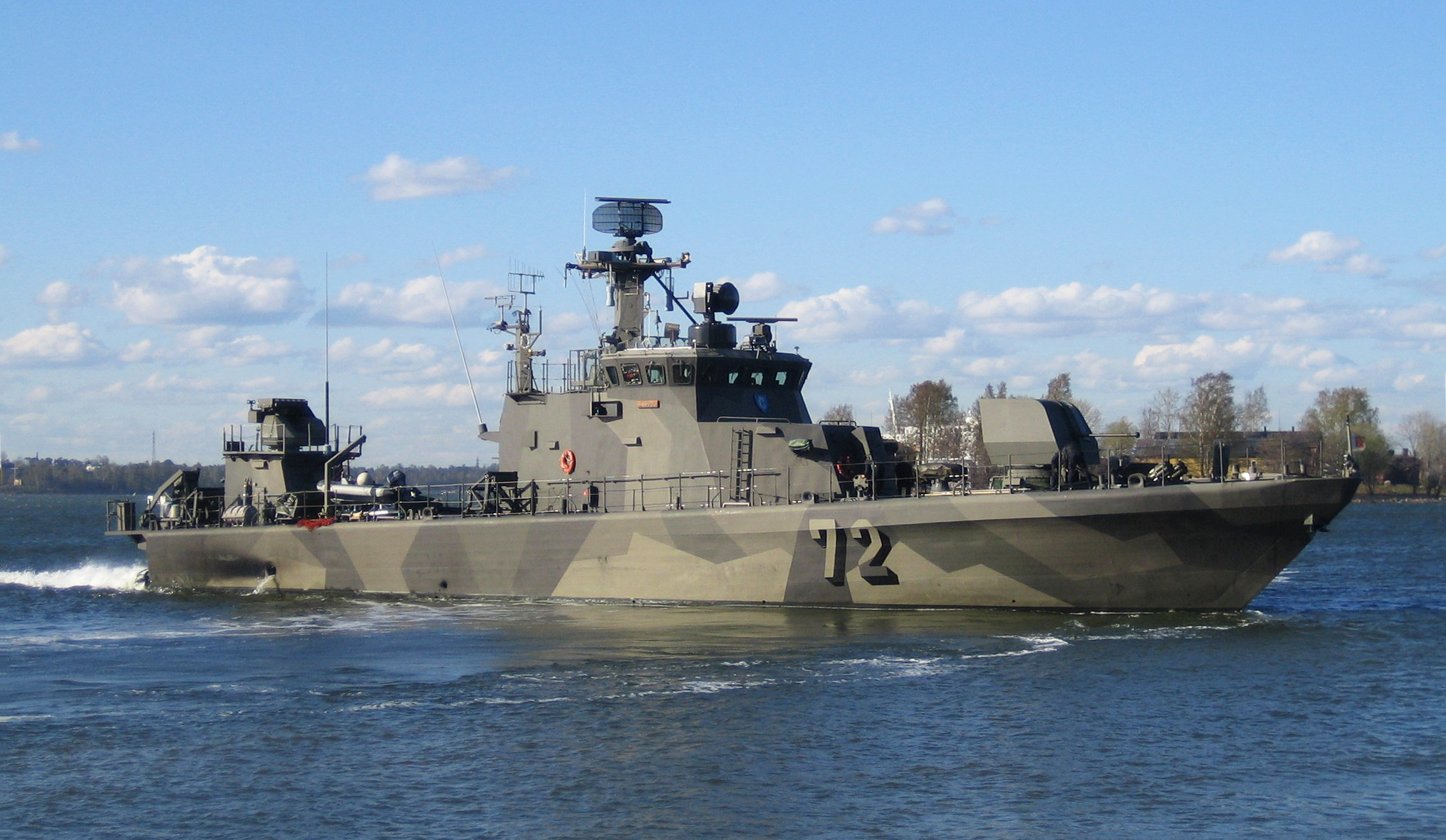
- FNS Porvoo

Class overview
- Name: Rauma class
- Builders: Rauma shipyard
- Operators: Finnish Navy
- Preceded by: Helsinki class
- Succeeded by: Hamina class, Squadron 2020
- In commission: 1990-present
- Completed: 4
- Active: 4

General characteristics
- Type: Fast attack craft
- Displacement: 240 tons
- Length: 48.5 m (159 ft 1 in)
- Beam: 8 m (26 ft 3 in)
- Draught: 1.5 m (4 ft 11 in)
- Installed power: 2 × MTU 16V 538 TB93 diesels, 6600 kW
- Propulsion: 2 × Riva Calzoni IRC 115 waterjets
- Speed: 34 knots (63 km/h; 39 mph)
- Complement: 19
- Sensors & processing systems: Saab 9LV225 Mk4 Combat Management System; Saab CEROS 200 FCS; Saab Microwave System Sea Giraffe 9GA 208 Surface search radar; Raytheon ARPA Navigation radar; Kongsberg ST2400 Towed sonar; Finnyards Sonac/PTA towed array sonar
- Electronic warfare & decoys: MASS decoy system
- Armament: 1 × Bofors 40 mm/70; 2 × NSV 12.7 mm machine guns; 6 × Saab RBS-15 Mk3 SSM; 2 × Saab Elma ASW-600 9-tube ASW mortars; Mine rails for tactical mines can be fitted instead of missiles

The Rauma-class missile boats (Finnish: Rauma-luokan ohjusvene) are a class of missile boat in use by the Finnish Navy.

It is the predecessor of the Hamina-class missile boats. The ships were constructed at the Rauma shipyard (initially by Hollming and after the merger Finnyards) in Rauma, Finland. All the ships have their home port in Pansio.

All four vessels underwent a 70 million EUR modernization program at the Western Shipyard in Teijo. The program includes the installation of a new version of the 9LV225 control and command system made by SAAB (the Mk.3 has been replaced by a Mk.4), the replacement of the Mistral SAM missiles with a MASS decoy system. The MASS system also replaces the Philax chaff and IR flares, the Thales Matilda radar warning system, and the six 103 mm rails for rocket illuminants, that were previously fitted. The sonar and ASW systems are being completely renewed (the previous Simrad ST 240 has been replaced by a ST2400). The modernization programme began late in 2010 with all four vessels expected to be ready by autumn 2013. The first vessel, Naantali, was handed over to the Finnish Navy in May 2013. The modernization will allow the vessels to be operational into the 2020s.

The vessels were previously armed with a sextuple Mistral SAM launcher, which could be replaced by a Sako twin-barrel 23 mm/87 anti-aircraft cannon (a modified version of the ZU-23-2). Additionally the vessels had a portable Mistral SAM launcher pad that could be mounted on the ship's deck, or on land, in order to protect them when moored.

After modernization in 2010-2013 the SAM system was replaced by a MASS launcher.

On 18 February 2015, the Finnish media reported that the Rauma class has been banned from use after fatigue damage was discovered in the vessels' hull.

The vessels were repaired and back in operation by 2016. They are planned to be retired from service when the new Pohjanmaa-class corvettes enter service in the late 2020s.

== List of ships ==
| Pennant number | Name | Builder | Ordered | Commissioned | Modernized | Home base | Status |
|---|---|---|---|---|---|---|---|
| 70 | Rauma | Hollming | 27 August 1987 | 18 October 1990 | | Pansio | In active service |
| 71 | Raahe | Hollming | | 20 August 1991 | 26 June 2013 | Pansio | In active service |
| 72 | Porvoo | Finnyards | | 27 April 1992 | | Pansio | In active service |
| 73 | Naantali | Finnyards | | 23 June 1992 | 20 May 2013 | Pansio | In active service |
