= Kuha-class minesweeper =

There have been two different classes of minesweepers named Kuha in the Finnish Navy:

- Kuha-class minesweeper (1941)
- Kuha-class minesweeper (1974)
