= Kuha-class minesweeper (1974) =

Finnish inshore naval ship class

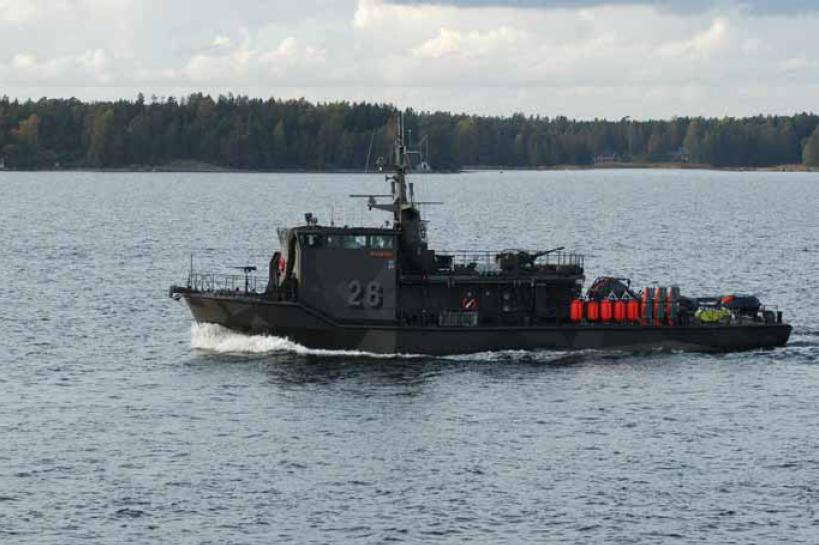
- Kuha 26

Class overview
- Name: Kuha class
- Builders: Oy Laivateollisuus Ab, Turku, Finland
- Operators: Finnish Navy
- Succeeded by: Katanpää class
- Planned: 14
- Completed: 6
- Canceled: 8
- Active: 4
- Retired: 2

General characteristics
- Type: Minesweeper
- Displacement: 127 t (125 long tons) fully loaded
- Length: 31.6 m (103 ft 8 in)
- Beam: 6.9 m (22 ft 8 in)
- Draught: 2.0 m (6 ft 7 in)
- Installed power: 2 × Cummins NT-380M diesel engines, 450 kW (600 bhp)
- Propulsion: 1 shaft, controllable pitch propeller
- Speed: 12 knots (22 km/h; 14 mph)
- Complement: 14
- Sensors & processing systems: Racal Decca radar
- Armament: 1 × twin 23 mm (0.91 in)/60 calibre guns; 1 × 12.7 mm (0.50 in) machine guns

The Kuha-class minesweepers (English: Zander) are a series of six inshore minesweepers of the Finnish Navy. The ships were constructed in 1974–1975. All the class vessels were modified and modernized in the late 1990s, including lengthening the hull. Two of the class were withdrawn from service in 2012. The rest of the class will retire after the Katanpää-class mine countermeasure vessels enter service.

== Description ==
Designed in the 1970s, the hulls of the minesweepers are constructed from glass-reinforced plastic. The Kuha-class minesweepers initially measured 26.6 metres (87 ft 3 in) long overall with a beam of 6.9 metres (22 ft 8 in) and a draught of 2.0 metres (6 ft 7 in). They had a fully loaded displacement of 91 tonnes (90 long tons). The vessels were lengthened during modernisation between 1997 and 2000, ending up 36.6 metres (120 ft 1 in) overall with an increased full load displacement of 127 tonnes (125 long tons).

The Kuha class is powered by two Cummins NT-380M diesel engines using hydrostatic transmission to turn one shaft and two controllable pitch propellers, creating 600 brake horsepower (450 kW). The engines are flexibly mounted, and they have active rudders. The vessels have a maximum speed of 12 knots (22 km/h; 14 mph). The Kuha class has a complement of either 2 or 3 officers and 12 enlisted.

The ships had two different armament types to begin with, initially armed with either two single 20 millimetres (0.79 in) guns or two ZU 23-millimetre (0.91 in)/60 calibre guns mounted in a single gun turret with an additional 20 mm gun. The armament was later made uniform throughout the class, with the twin-mounted 23 mm guns augmented with a 12.7-millimetre (0.50 in) machine gun. For minesweeping duties, the Kuha class is equipped with equipment to deal with magnetic, acoustic, and pressure mines capable of towing a Type F-82 electrode sweep. The minesweepers have Reson Seabat 6012 mine avoidance sonar, Patria Finavitec SONAC HF minehunting sonar, and Racal Decca radar. The Kuha class could also remotely operate a Kiiski-class drone minesweeper, which was put in operation beginning in 1983.

== Vessels of the class ==
Construction data
Hull number	Name	Builder	Completed	Status
21	Kuha 21	Oy Laivateollisuus Ab, Turku, Finland	28 June 1974	In service
22	Kuha 22	Oy Laivateollisuus Ab, Turku, Finland	1974	Retired in 2012
23	Kuha 23	Oy Laivateollisuus Ab, Turku, Finland	7 March 1975	In service
24	Kuha 24	Oy Laivateollisuus Ab, Turku, Finland	7 March 1975	In service
25	Kuha 25	Oy Laivateollisuus Ab, Turku, Finland	17 June 1975	Retired in 2012
26	Kuha 26	Oy Laivateollisuus Ab, Turku, Finland	13 November 1975	In service

== Construction and career ==
Due to limitations set by treaties following the end of World War II, the Finnish Navy was limited in the number and size of ships, along with the number of sailors the Finnish Navy was allowed to employ. Therefore, during the Cold War, the Finnish Navy was confined to building small, coastal defence ships, primarily minesweepers and missile boats. Fourteen hulls of the Kuha class were ordered in 1972. The last eight were cancelled, with only the first six hulls beginning construction in 1974. Built by Oy Laivateollisuus Ab, Turku, Finland, the six-class ships entered service in 1974–1975. Beginning in 1983, they worked in conjunction with the Kiiski-class drone minesweepers, which could either be crewed or uncrewed. The vessels underwent modernisation at Tyovene Shipyard in Uusikaupunki, Finland, where they were lengthened to accommodate new minesweeping control systems and new magnetic and acoustic sweeps. Kuha 21 completed its refit on 22 December 1997, Kuha 23 on 30 August 1998, Kuha 24 on 13 November 1998, and Kuha 26 on 30 May 2000. Kuha 22 and Kuha 25 were withdrawn from service in 2012. The rest of the Kuha class will be retired when the Katanpää-class mine countermeasure vessels enter active service.
