= Pansio-class minelayer =

Finnish Navy minelaying ship class

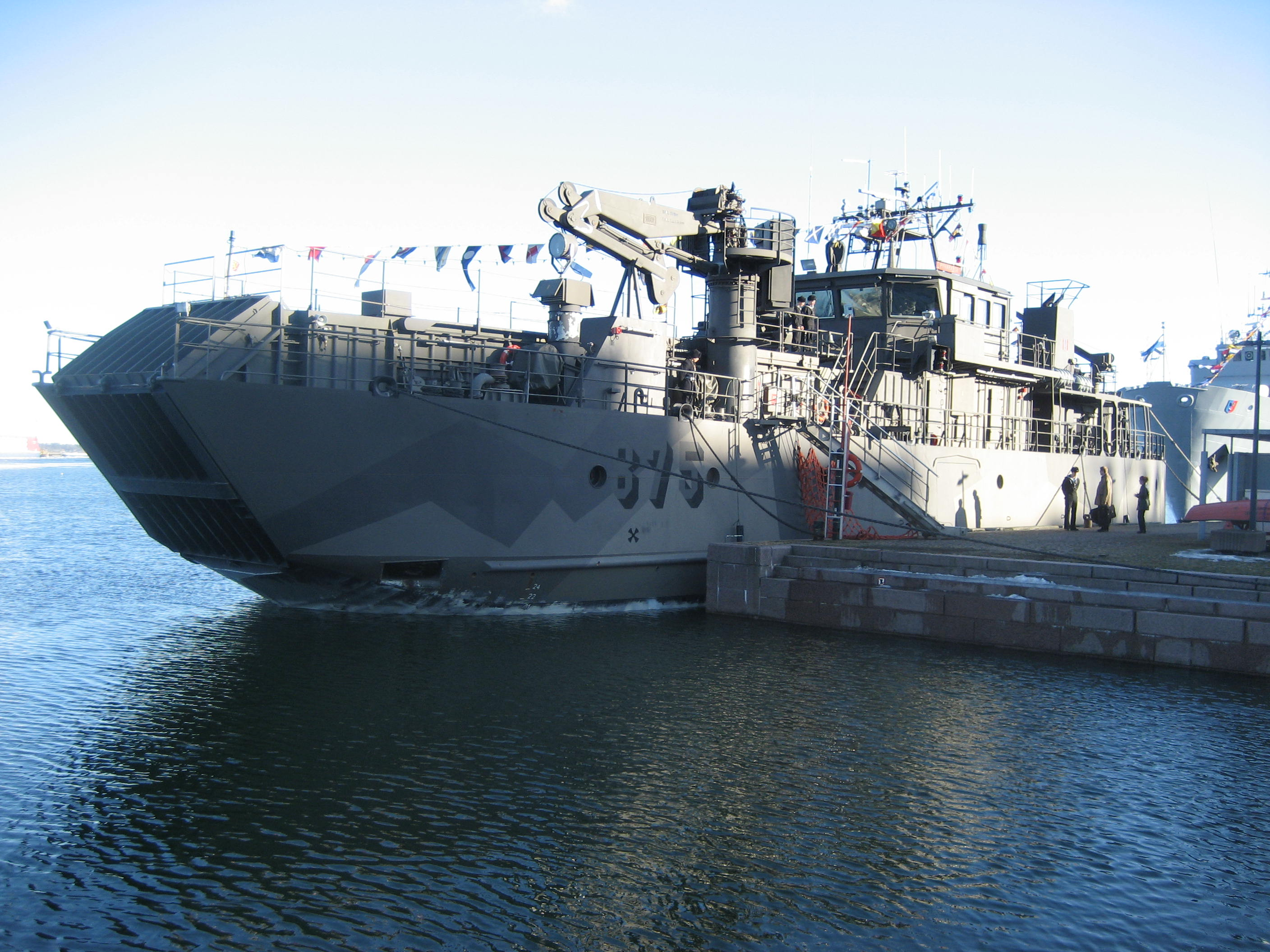
- Finnish minelayer Pyhäranta

Class overview
- Name: Pansio class
- Operators: Finnish Navy
- Completed: 3
- Active: 3

General characteristics
- Type: Minelayer
- Displacement: 680 tons
- Length: 43 m (141 ft 1 in)
- Beam: 10 m (32 ft 10 in)
- Draught: 2 m (6 ft 7 in)
- Propulsion: 2 × diesel engines; 1,100 kW (1,500 hp)
- Speed: 11 knots (20 km/h; 13 mph)
- Complement: 19
- Armament: 1 × Saab Trackfire RWS (1 × 7.62 mm PKM machine gun and 1 × 40 mm H&K GMG); 1 × 12.7 mm NSV; 50 mines (Sea Mine 2000)

The Pansio-class minelayers are a three-strong class of mine warfare vessels used by the Finnish Navy, built between 1991 and 1992. The vessels can also be used for transport or to supply the naval forts. The vessels can carry a 100-ton load and are named for Pansio.

The ships are referred to as "mine ferries" in the Finnish Navy.

== Mid-life upgrade ==
The three vessels went through a mid-life upgrade between 2015 and 2017 and are now expected to serve until the 2030s. The upgrades included new main and auxiliary engines, as well as a new high-pressure fire extinguishing system. The vessels were also equipped with a Saab Trackfire remote weapon station with a 7.62 mm PKM machine gun and a 40 mm Heckler & Koch GMG. The two Sako twin-barreled 23 mm/87 (modified ZU-23-2) were removed.

== Service ==
On 24 August 2022 Pyhäranta ran aground in the Archipelago Sea, off Turku, Finland. Her hull was holed.

== List of ships ==
Pennant number	Name	Builder	Built	Commissioned	Modernized	Home base	Status
90 (ex-876 and ex-576)	Pansio	Olkiluoto	1991	25 September 1991		Pansio	In active service
92 (ex-875, ex-575 and ex-475)	Pyhäranta	Olkiluoto		26 May 1992		Upinniemi	In active service
91 (ex-777)	Porkkala	Olkiluoto		29 October 1992		Upinniemi	In active service
