= Katanpää-class mine countermeasure vessel =

Class of naval ships in the Finnish Navy

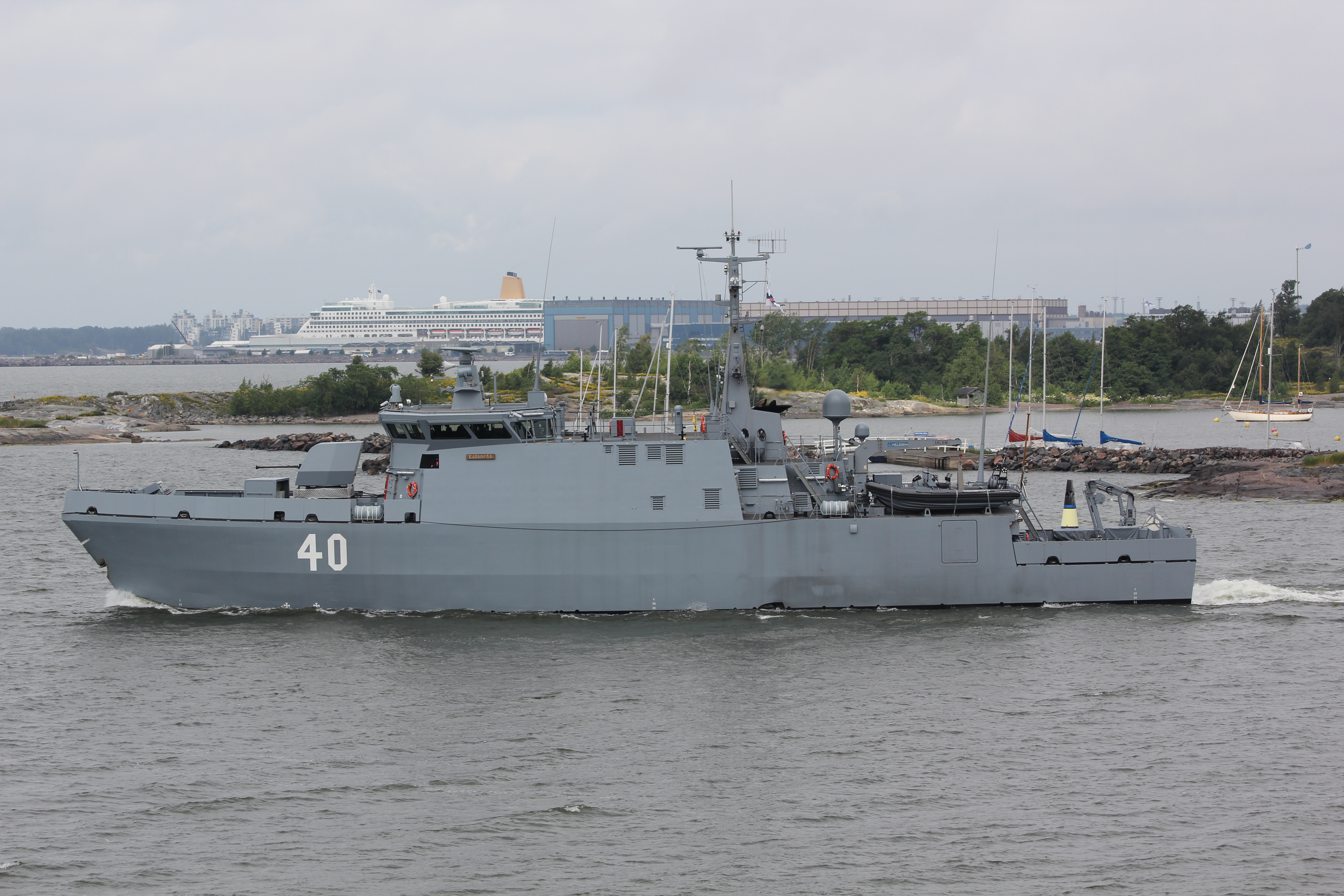

Class overview
- Name: Katanpää-class mine countermeasure vessel
- Builders: Intermarine S.p.A., Sarzana, Italy
- Operators: Finnish Navy
- Preceded by: Kuha-class minesweeper
- Cost: €244.8 M for three vessels
- Built: 2007-2016
- In service: 2012–
- Completed: 3

General characteristics
- Type: Mine countermeasure vessel
- Displacement: 680 tons
- Length: 52.45 m (172 ft 1 in)
- Beam: 9.87 m (32 ft 5 in)
- Draught: 3.15 m (10 ft 4 in)
- Installed power: 2 × MTU 8V-396-TE74 (2 × 1,000 kW)
- Propulsion: Diesel-electric with two Voith Schneider 18 GH/135-PP propellers Combimac electric motors
- Speed: 13 knots (24 km/h; 15 mph)
- Range: 1,500 nmi (2,800 km; 1,700 mi)
- Complement: 34–38
- Underwater vehicles: Kongsberg Maritime HUGIN 1000 AUV; Hydroid REMUS 100 AUV; Saab Underwater Systems Double Eagle Mark II ROV; Atlas Elektronik SeaFox I ROV
- Sensors & processing systems: Atlas Elektronik integrated mine countermeasure system; Kongsberg Maritime EM-710 RD multibeam echosounder; Kongsberg Maritime TOPAS echosounder; Atlas HMS-12M hull-mounted sonar; Klein Associates Klein 5500 towed side-scanning sonar; Kongsberg Maritime HiPAP underwater positioning system
- Armament: Bofors 40 mm L/70; Depth charges

Katanpää-class mine countermeasure vessels are a class of three multipurpose mine countermeasure vessels (MCMV) ordered by the Finnish Navy. The nearly 250 million euro contract was awarded to the Italian shipyard Intermarine S.p.A. in 2006. Initially, all three vessels were scheduled to be delivered by 2014 and the class was expected to achieve operational readiness by 2015, but there have been various delays and the last vessel was handed over to the Finnish Navy in November 2016.

The Katanpää class is expected to remain in service until 2040–2042.

== Development and construction ==
In its safety and defence policy report of 2004 the Finnish Government announced that, in addition to training mobile coastal troops and protecting sea traffic, the Finnish Navy would start focusing on developing its mine countermeasure capabilities. As a result a decision was made to retire the aging Kuha-class minesweepers and invest in a new mine countermeasure fleet, which would include minehunters and -sweepers, divers and a new mine warfare information system.

A request for bids was published on 5 June 2004 and by 3 January 2005 the Finnish Navy had received offers from seven shipyards, both domestic and foreign. After an extensive evaluation it was decided to continue negotiations with Intermarine S.p.A. of Italy. Kockums AB of Sweden and Navantia SA from Spain. Aker Finnyards Oy (Finland), Armaris SA (France), Lürssen Werft GmbH and Abeking & Rasmussen GmbH (both German) were left out. In November 2006 the contract for three mine countermeasure vessels was awarded to the Italian shipyard Intermarine S.P.A. The total order worth was 244.8 million euros and it will include a spare parts package. About 50 % of the total cost is contracted for Finnish companies and the shipbuilding contract includes a 100 % offset agreement.

The construction of the first vessel began in July 2007 with the ceremony of "start of lamination" which, for vessels built of composite materials, equals to the steel cutting ceremony. The construction of the second vessel was started in March 2008 and the third vessel in February 2009. The construction of the vessels was delayed by one year after the shipyard was devastated by a flood in early 2009. Two more floods occurred in late 2009, but the damage was not as extensive.

The lead vessel of the class, Katanpää, began its sea trials in March 2011, but due to additional delays it was not delivered until 4 May 2012. The vessel was shipped to Finland onboard BigLift heavy lift vessel Happy Dover which left Italy on 21 May. Katanpää was presented to the public in Helsinki on 9 July 2012, the 94th anniversary of the Finnish Navy. The second vessel, Purunpää, was delivered to the Finnish Navy on 20 August 2013 and arrived in Turku onboard Happy Dynamic one month later. The third vessel, initially expected by 2015, was handed over to the Finnish Navy in November 2016 and will arrive in Finland in December.

The Katanpää-class mine countermeasure vessels are expected to remain in service until 2040-2042.

== Naming ==
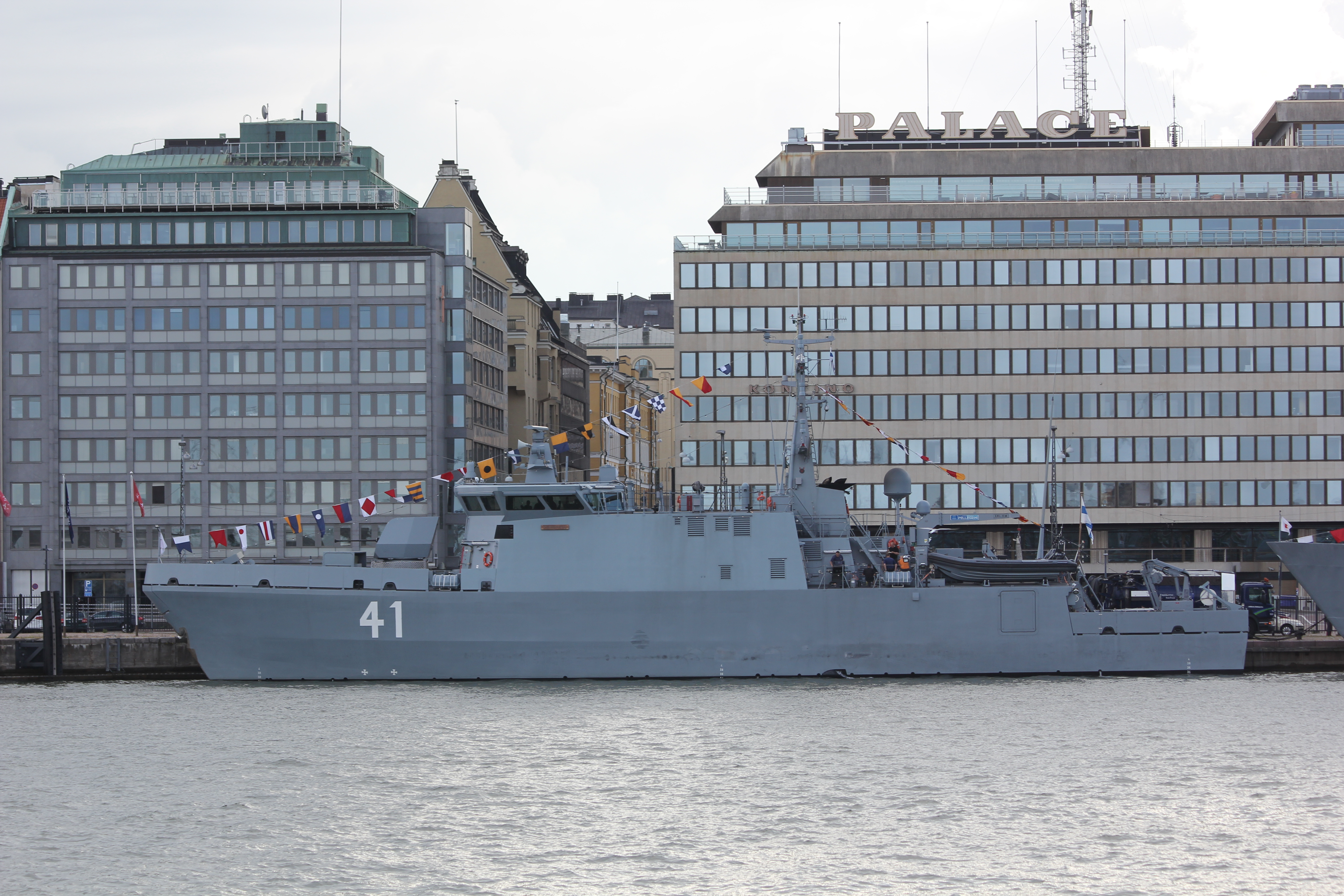
Purunpää

The Katanpää-class mine countermeasure vessels were initially referred to as the MCMV 2010 class after the mine countermeasure development project and "MITO class" after the Finnish word for mine countermeasures, miinantorjunta. As naval vessel classes of the Finnish Navy are traditionally named after the lead ship of the class, the new class of mine countermeasure vessels received its final name when the first vessel was named Katanpää (pennant number 40) on 16 June 2009. The second vessel of the Katanpää class received its name, Purunpää (41), on 26 September 2010 and the third one was named Vahterpää (42) on 3 November 2011.

The vessels have been named after historical locations, Katanpää being an old island fortress and naval port outside Kustavi in Western Finland, Purunpää an old harbor site in Dragsfjärd and Vahterpää an old naval base outside Loviisa in the Gulf of Finland. The same names were also carried by three of the four BYMS class minesweepers operated by the Finnish Navy in the 1950s. For the new class of vessels, the Finnish Navy has adopted a new prefix "MHC" which stands for "Mine Hunter Coastal".

== Technical details ==
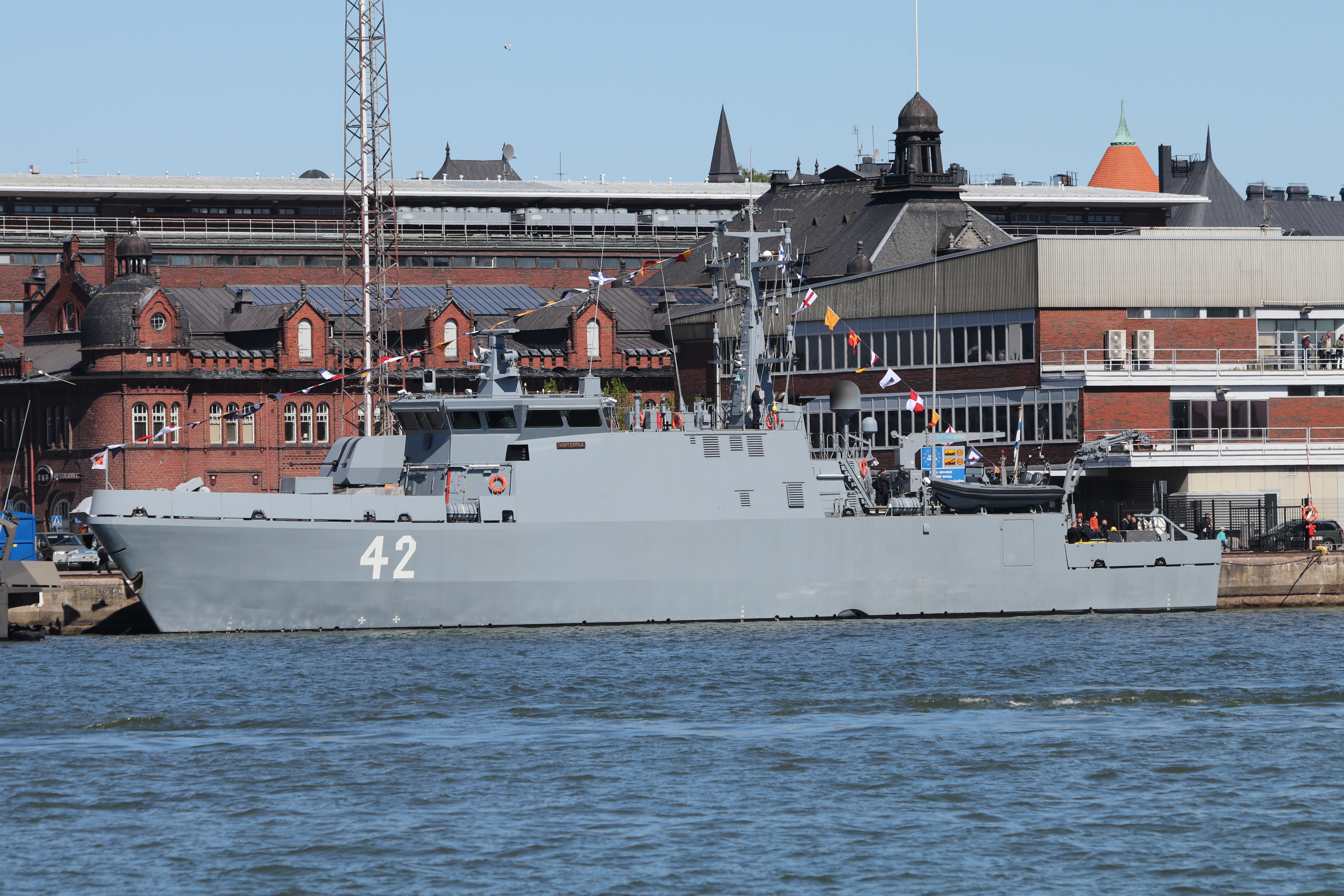
Vahterpää

The Katanpää-class mine countermeasure vessels are constructed of laminated composite materials. They are 52.45 metres (172.1 ft) long and have a beam of 9.47 metres (31.1 ft) and a draft of 3.15 metres (10.3 ft). The hull, decks and bulkheads are made of fiberglass, which in places are up to 150 millimetres (5.9 in) thick. The decks are additionally reinforced with balsa and carbon fiber. This improves shock resistance against underwater explosions and reduces the vessels' magnetic, noise and pressure signatures that could detonate the mines. The low-signature diesel-electric propulsion system consists of two MTU 8V-396-TE74 high-speed diesel engines, each producing 1,000 kW (1,300 hp), and two Voith Schneider propellers. The Katanpää-class vessels are designed to operate in archipelagoes, coastal regions and open seas, and are capable of operating in ice. They will have a service speed of 13 knots (24 km/h; 15 mph) and a maximum range of 1,500 nautical miles (2,800 km; 1,700 mi).

The Katanpää-class vessels will be equipped with an extensive array of equipment to search for, locate and destroy naval mines, ranging from two autonomous underwater vehicles (AUV) and two remotely operated vehicles (ROV) to hull-mounted sensors. The larger AUV, HUGIN (High Precision Untethered Geosurvey and Inspection system), which is manufactured by Kongsberg Maritime, is over four meters long and weighs over 800 kg (1,800 lb). It is equipped with a multibeam echosounder (MBES), a smaller version of the one mounted on the hull of the vessel. This instrument is used to collect topographic information of the seabed and a synthetic aperture side-scanning sonar can be used to detect and classify targets. The smaller AUV, REMUS 100 (Remote Environmental Monitoring Unit), weighs only 41 kg (90 lb) and can be used to collect information of the sea floor with its side-scanning sonar at depths of up to 100 metres. Two ROVs, a Double Eagle by Saab Underwater Systems of Sweden and SeaFox I by Atlas Elektronik of Germany, can be used to identify and destroy naval mines. The hull-mounted sensors include a Kongsberg EM-710 RD multibeam echosounder and a TOPAS (Topographic Parametric Sonar) sediment echosounder with jets that can penetrate the uppermost strata of the seabed. In addition the vessels will be equipped with American-made Klein Associates Klein 5500 towed side-scanning sonars. Underwater positioning is provided with Kongsberg HiPAP 500 (High Precision Acoustic Positioning) system. The vessels follow a toolbox principle in which a suitable combination of sensors and equipment is selected individually for each mission according to the task and environmental conditions.

Each vessel of the Katanpää class is equipped with a Bofors 40 mm L/70 gun for self-defence. The fire control is provided by Atlas Elektronik and the integrated system utilizes EOTS TV/IR multisensors. The system can be controlled from either one of five consoles in the combat information center or from the bridge, although only one console is equipped with the pedals required to control the gun. In addition the vessels are armed with depth charges.
