= Saab Trackfire =

Swedish remotely operated weapon system

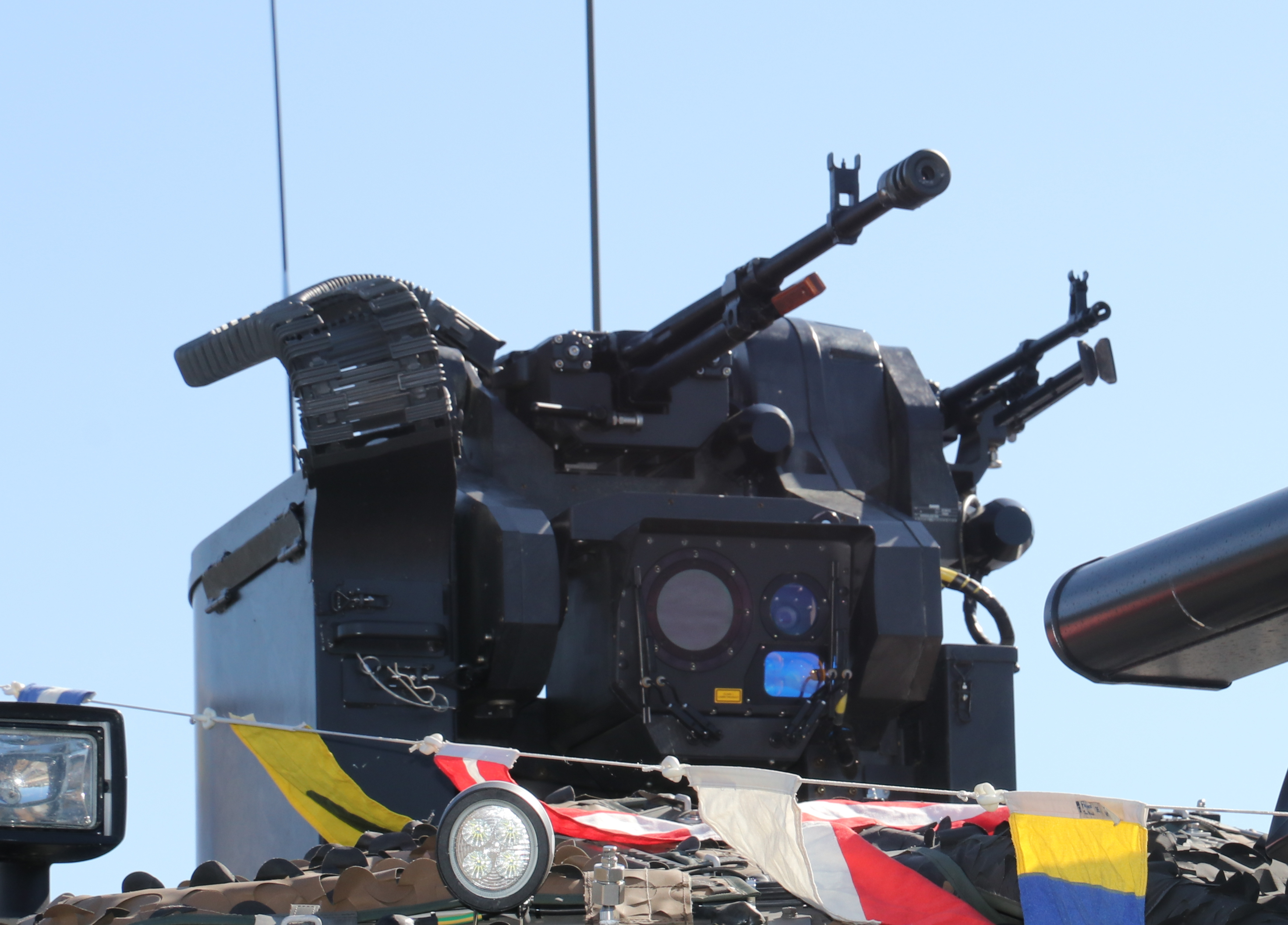
Saab Trackfire on a Jehu-class landing craft

The Saab Trackfire is a remote weapon station, i.e. a remotely operated weapon system that can be fitted with either medium or light caliber weapons. It can be mounted on vehicles, ships and stationary platforms. It is manufactured by Saab Group.

== Operators ==
Finland
Ships and vessels using the Trackfire in the Finnish Navy:
- Hamina-class missile boat
- Jehu-class landing craft
- Pansio-class minelayer
- Pohjanmaa-class corvette
Lithuania
Ships and vessels using the Trackfire in the Lithuanian Navy:
Jehu-class landing craft (Lithuanian Navy: Ordered in 2022.)
Sweden
Ships and vessels using the Trackfire in the Swedish Navy:
- CB90 HSM
- BevB 88
Vehicles using the Trackfire in the Swedish Army:
- Sisu GTP (TGB 24) equipped with the Saab Trackfire ARES for the C-UAS role, equipped with a Giraffe 1X radar, and armed with the M230LF (30×113mm) and the FN MAG 58 (7.62×51mm NATO).
- Mercedes-Benz G-Class W461 6×6 (Tgb 15) equipped with the Saab Trackfire ARES for the C-UAS role, equipped with a Giraffe 1X radar, and armed with the M230LF (30×113mm) and the FN MAG 58 (7.62×51mm NATO).
