= Elma ASW-600 =

Anti-submarine mortar

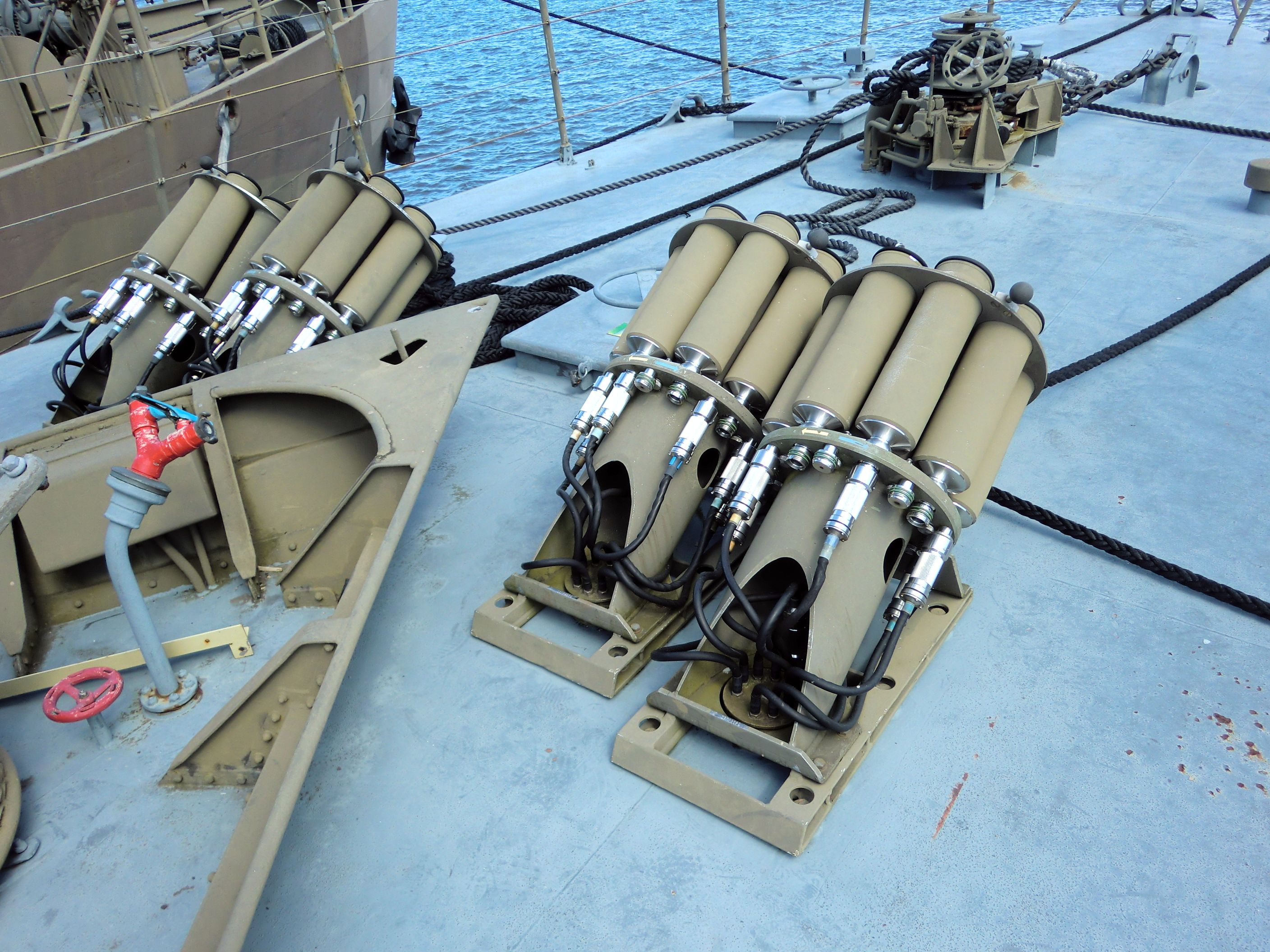
Elma ASW-600

The Elma ASW-600 is an anti-submarine warfare system designed by the Saab Group and used by the Royal Swedish Navy. It is designated in Antiubåts-granatkastarsystemen 83 in Sweden, and was previously called the Elma LLS-920.

== History ==
The ASW-600 was initially designed in the 1980s. In 2018, the Defence Materiel Administration announced it would be reintroducing the system aboard Koster-class mine countermeasures vessels.

== Export ==
In 1993, the Swedish Parliamentary Advisory Council on the Export of War Materials approved the export of the ASW-600 to Indonesia.
