= Pansio =

City district in Turku, Finland

Coordinates: 60°26′50″N 22°9′20″E

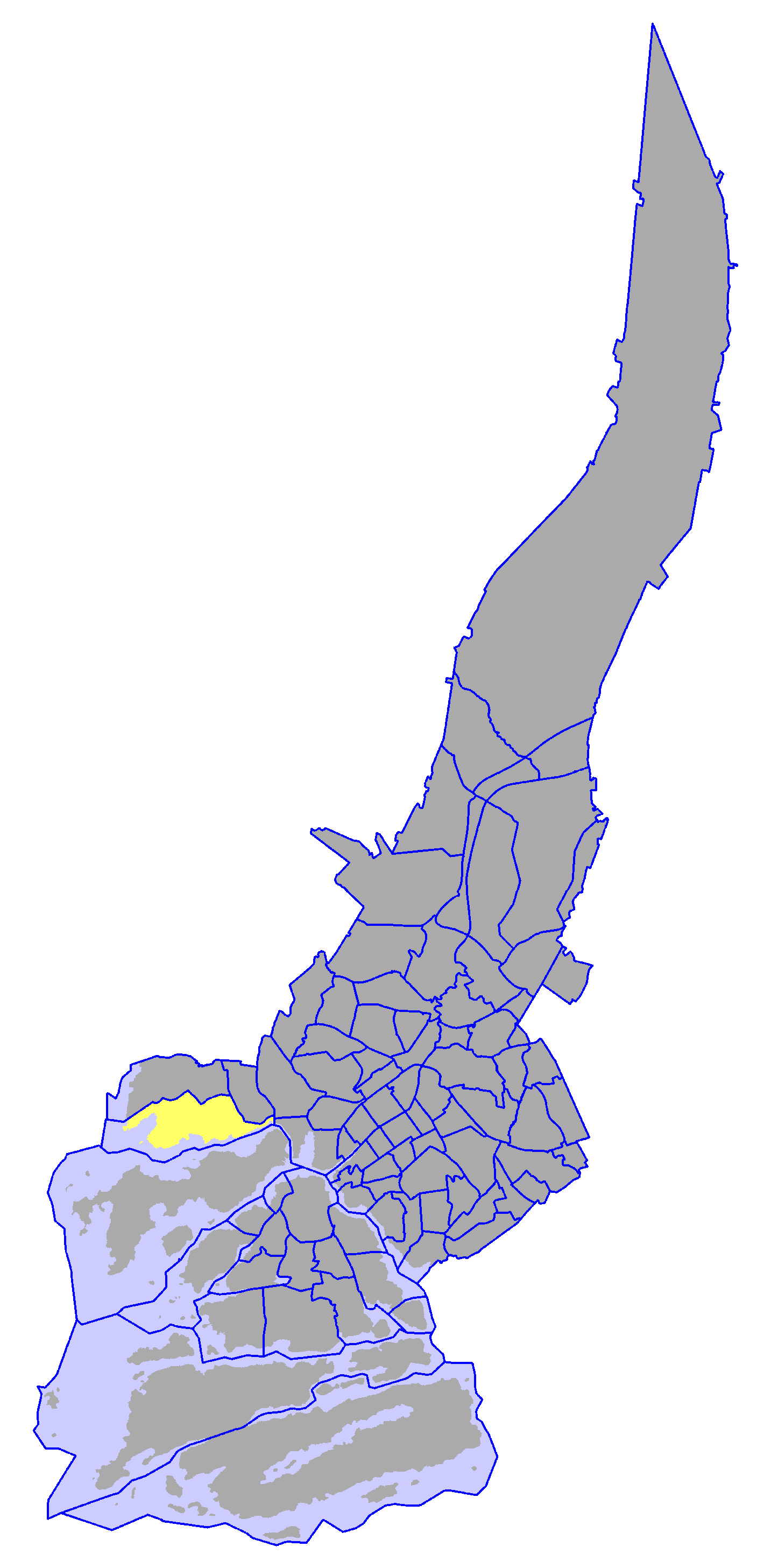
Pansio on a map of Turku.

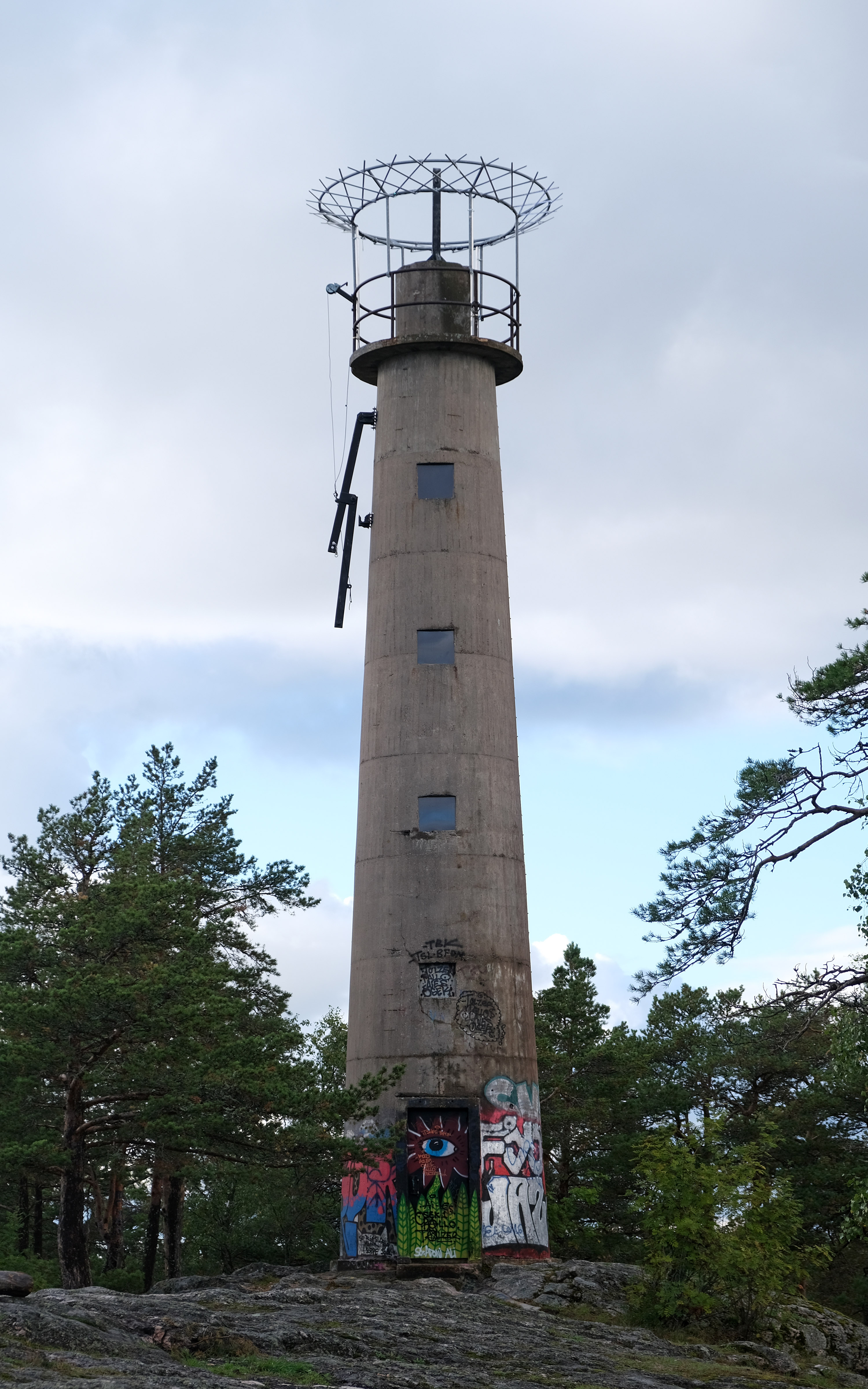
An aerial lighthouse in Pansio

Pansio is a district and a suburb of the city of Turku, Finland. It is located in the western part of the city. It has a population of 2,809 (as of 2006), and an annual population growth of -3.83%.

19.25% of the district's population are under 15 years old, while 11.85% are over 65. The district's linguistic makeup is 87.82% Finnish, 1.55% Swedish, and 10.93% other. Pansio has a problem with unemployment, with an unemployment rate of 14.2% - the sixth highest of all districts in Turku.

== Community facilities ==
Pansion koulu (Pansio School) offers basic education for students in grades 1–6.

There is a State run youth centre.

== Economy ==
A good part of the district is industrial area, and parts of the Port of Turku are located there. Pansio hosts a naval base of the Finnish Navy, Archipelago Sea Naval Command. The Pansio-class minelayer takes its name from the region.

== See also ==
- Districts of Turku
- Districts of Turku by population
