= Kiiski-class minesweeper =

Minesweeper ship class of the Finnish Navy

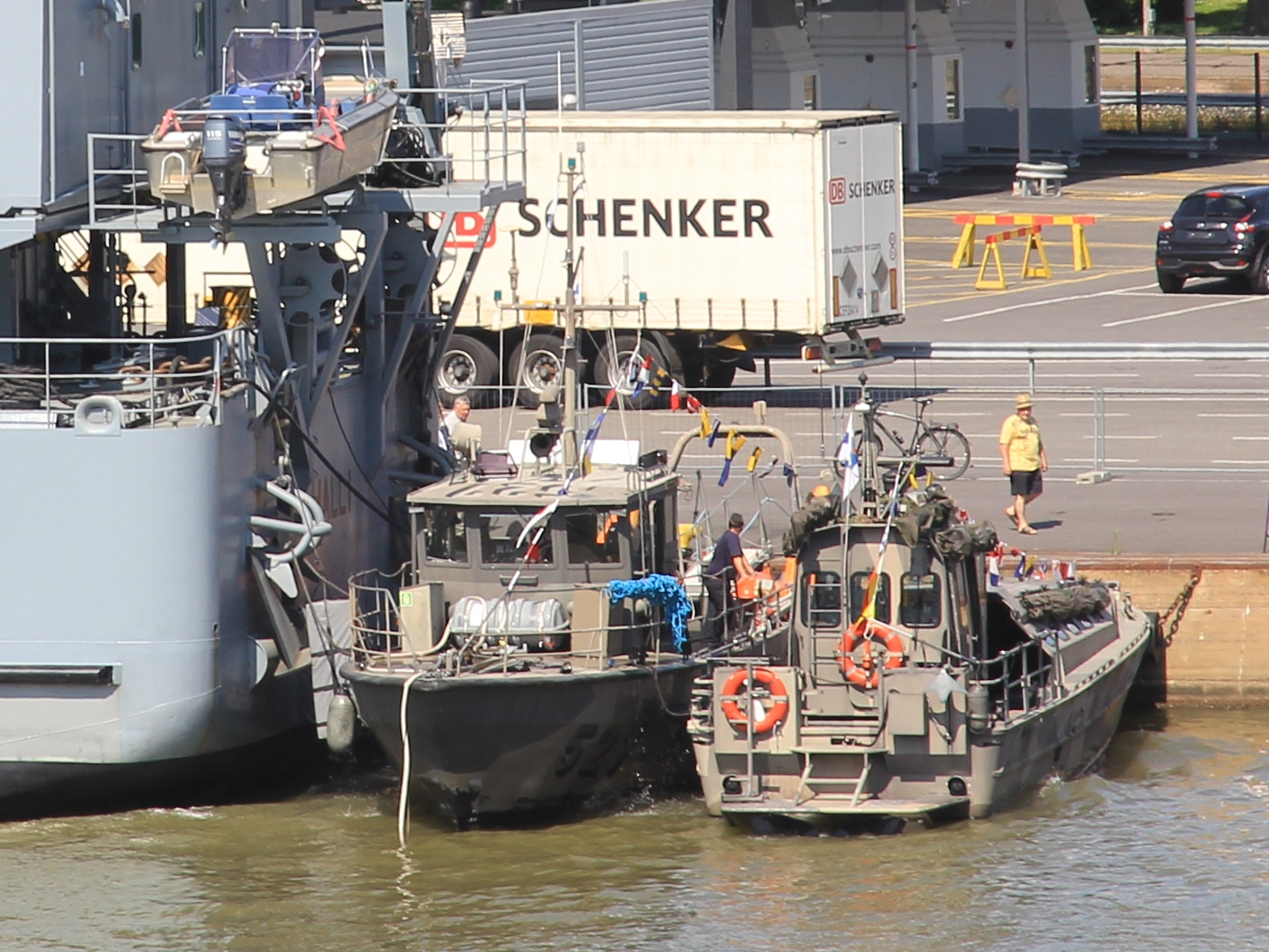
- Kiiski 7 in Aura river between the stern of Halli and Jurmo U613

Class overview
- Name: Kiiski
- Completed: 7

General characteristics
- Type: Minesweeper
- Displacement: 20 tons
- Length: 15.8 m
- Beam: 4 m
- Draught: 1.3 m
- Speed: 11 knots
- Armament: 1× 12.7 mm machine gun

The Kiiski-class minesweepers (English: Ruffe) are a series of seven small minesweepers of the Finnish Navy. The ships were constructed in 1975 and were modernized in the 1990s.

== Vessels of the class ==
Kiiski 1 (521)
Kiiski 2 (522)
Kiiski 3 (523)
Kiiski 4 (524)
Kiiski 5 (525)
Kiiski 6 (526)
Kiiski 7 (527)
