= Heckler & Koch GMG =

GMG
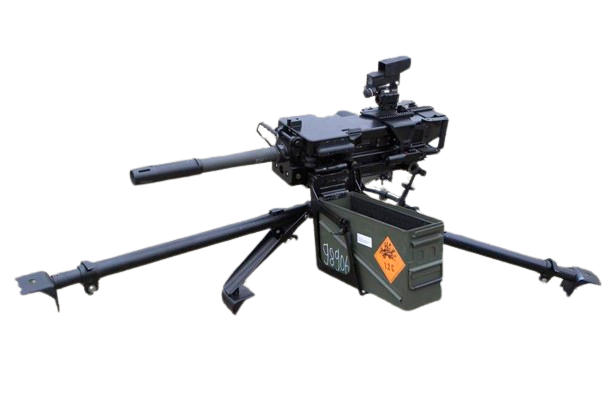
- A GMG of the German Army.
- Type: Automatic grenade launcher
- Place of origin: Germany

Service history
- In service: 1990s–present
- Used by: See Users
- Wars: War in Afghanistan (2001–2021); Russian invasion of Ukraine

Production history
- Designed: 1992–1995
- Manufacturer: Heckler & Koch
- Produced: 1996–present
- Variants: GMW

Specifications
- Mass: 28.8 kg Gun, 10.7 kg tripod and 8 kg softmount.
- Length: 1,090 mm
- Barrel length: 415 mm
- Width: 226 mm (without ammunition box)
- Height: 208 mm
- Cartridge: 40x53 mm
- Action: API Blowback
- Rate of fire: 340 rounds/min
- Muzzle velocity: 241 m/s
- Effective firing range: 1,500 m
- Maximum firing range: 2,200 m
- Feed system: 32-round disintegrating, closed-link belt
- Sights: Reflex sight and back-up leaf sight

The GMG (Granatmaschinengewehr or "grenade machine gun") is an automatic grenade launcher developed by Heckler & Koch for the German Army. It is also often referred to as GMW or GraMaWa (Granatmaschinenwaffe).

== Design details ==
The GMG fires 40 mm grenades at a rate of about 340 rounds per minute. It is belt-fed, and can be loaded from either side, making it easy to mount on most platforms. With a variety of day and night sights available, the GMG can be used for most medium-range infantry support situations.

The weapon is 109 cm long and has a 415 mm rifled barrel and a 470 × 160 × 250 mm ammunition box. The gun cycles on a recoil-operated blow-back basis. It weighs 29 kg; the tripod is an additional 11 kg.

== Testing and operation ==
The HK GMG was tested in the Yuma desert in Arizona in 1997 to be able to compete for United States contracts.

== Users ==
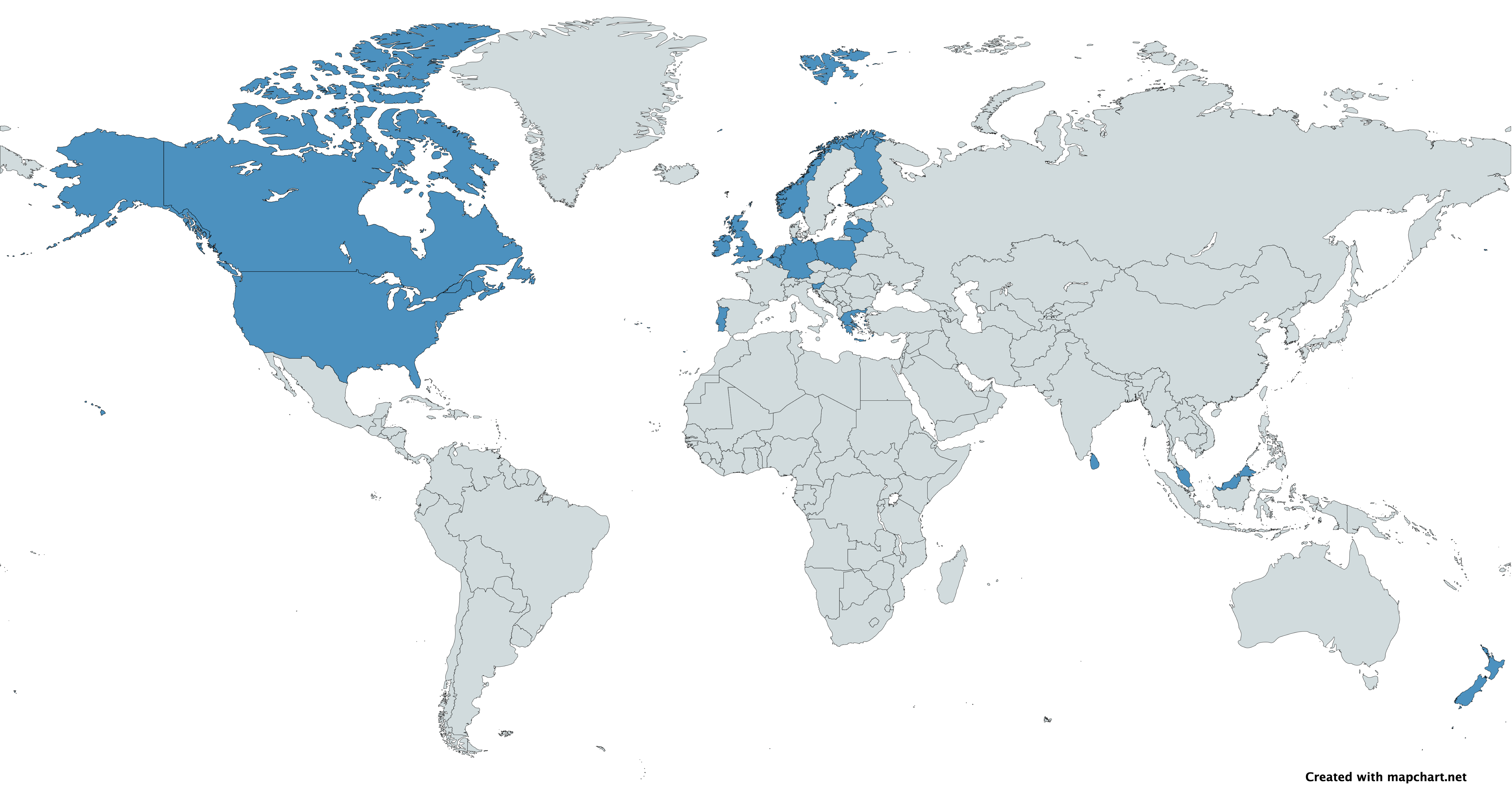
Map with Heckler & Koch GMG users in blue

- Belgium: Mounted on the army's Jankel FOX Rapid Reaction Vehicles
- Canada: 304 ordered. Designated as the C16 Close Area Suppression Weapon (CASW) and licence-built by Rheinmetall Defence Canada.
- Finland Locally known as 40 KRKK 2005
- Germany
- Greece
- Ireland: Irish Army
- Latvia
- Lithuania: Lithuanian Armed Forces.
- Malaysia: Used by Pasukan Khas Laut (PASKAL) of the Royal Malaysian Navy.
- Netherlands
- New Zealand
- Norway
- Poland: Wojska Specjalne.
- Portugal: Used by Portuguese Army, Portuguese Marine Corps and National Republican Guard.
- Slovenia
- Sri Lanka: Used by Sri Lanka Armoured Corps on its Main Battle Tanks & Used by Sri Lanka Navy on its Fast Attack Crafts.
- Ukraine: 100 donated by Germany in response to the Russian invasion of Ukraine as of July 2024.
- United Kingdom: 44 purchased in 2006 for use in Afghanistan and Iraq. Designated as L134A1.
- United States: Used by USSOCOM.
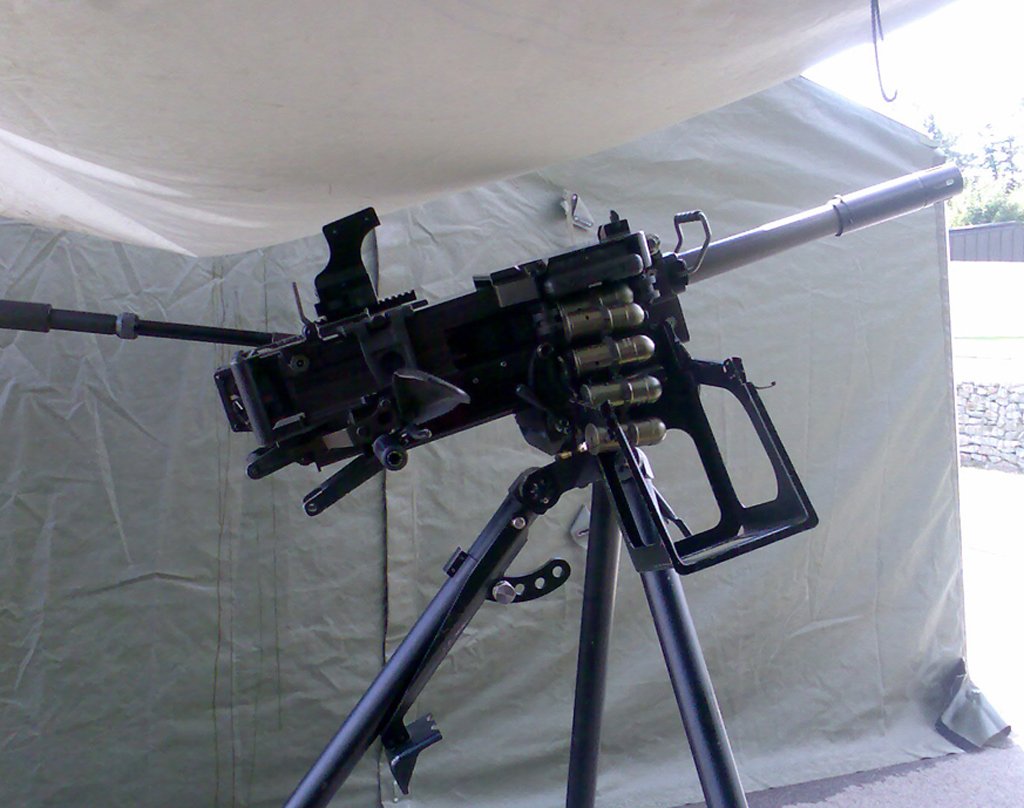
Another GMW/GMG of the German Army.

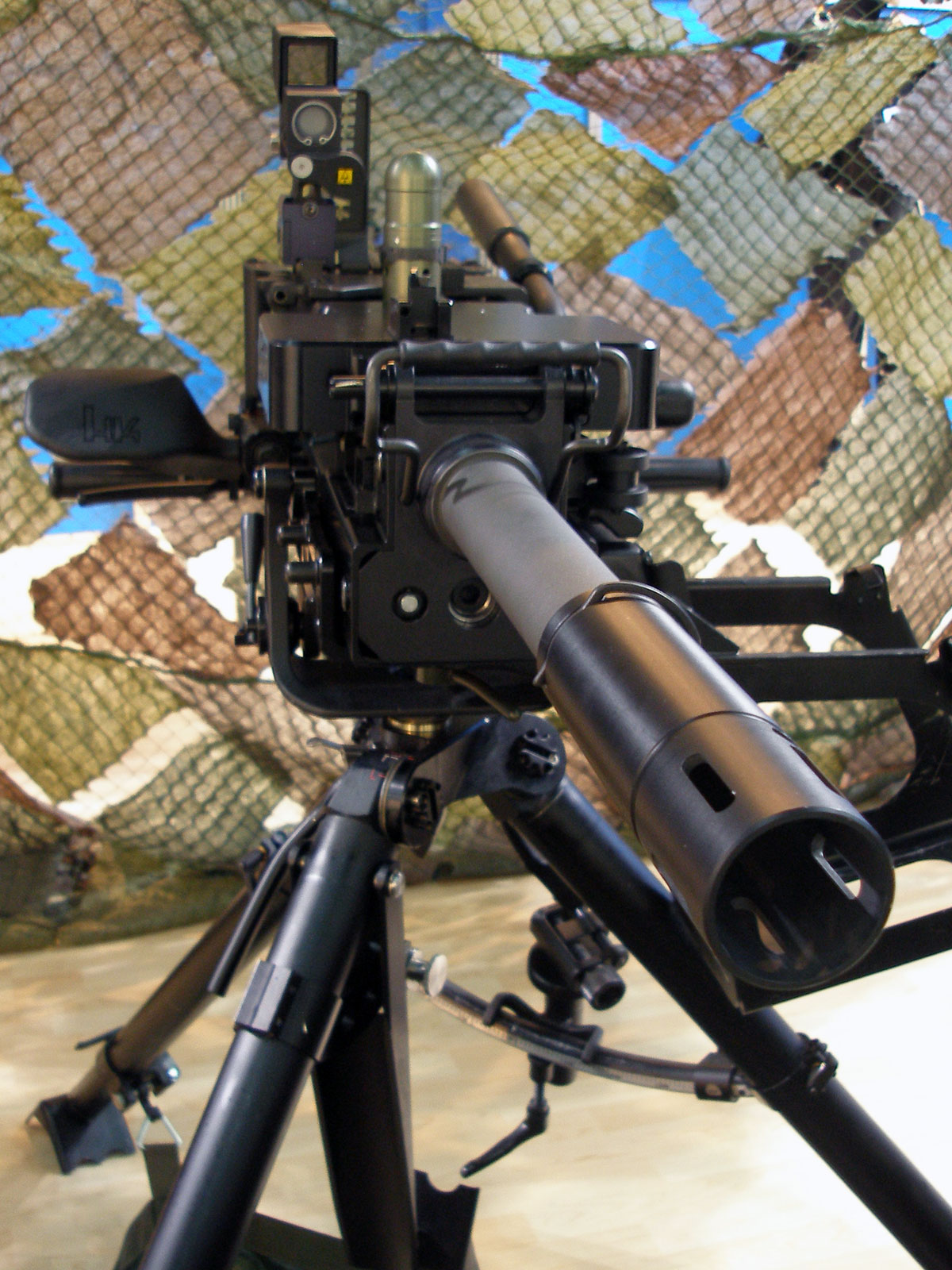
HK GMG on display.

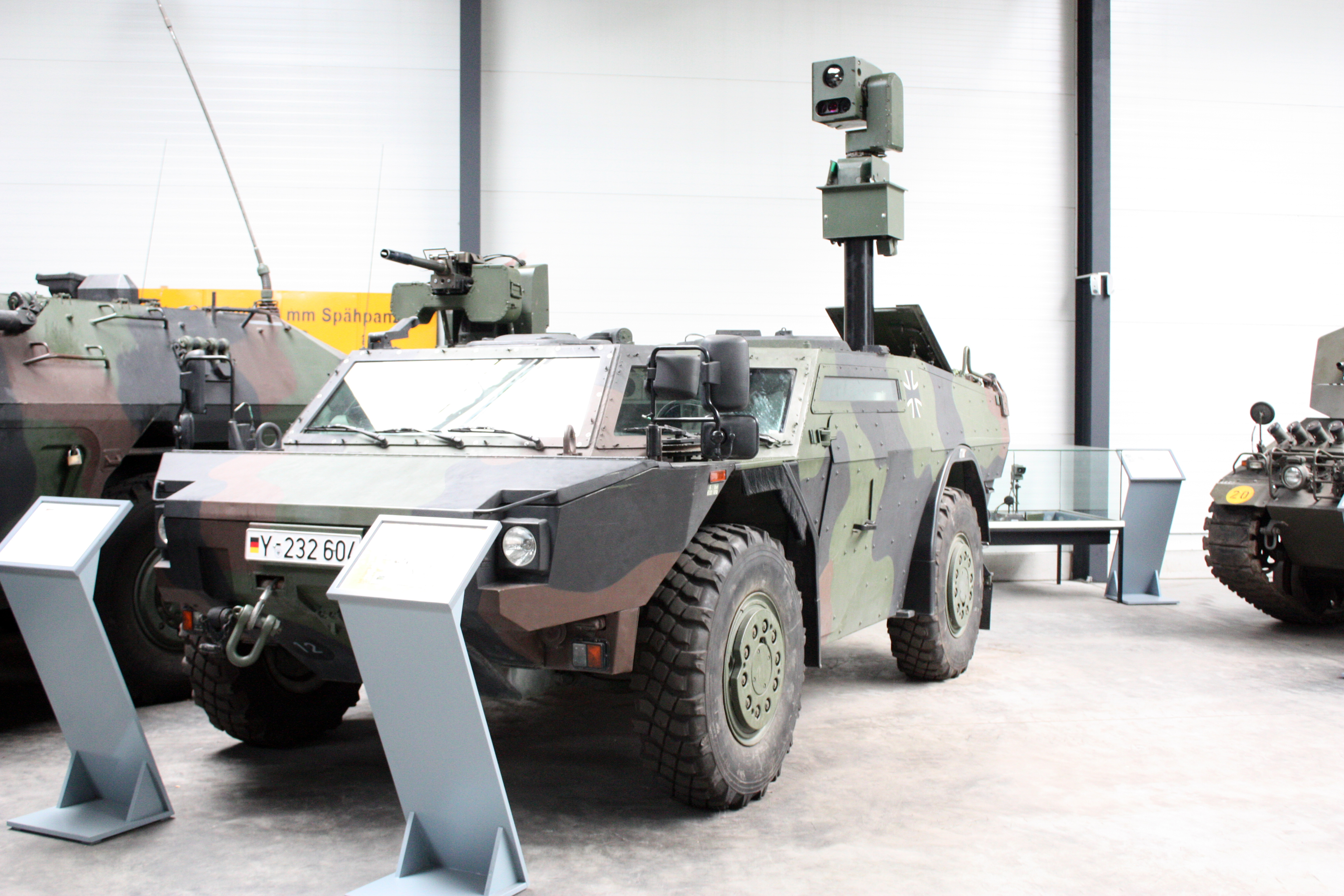
GMG German armed reconnaissance vehicle Fennek

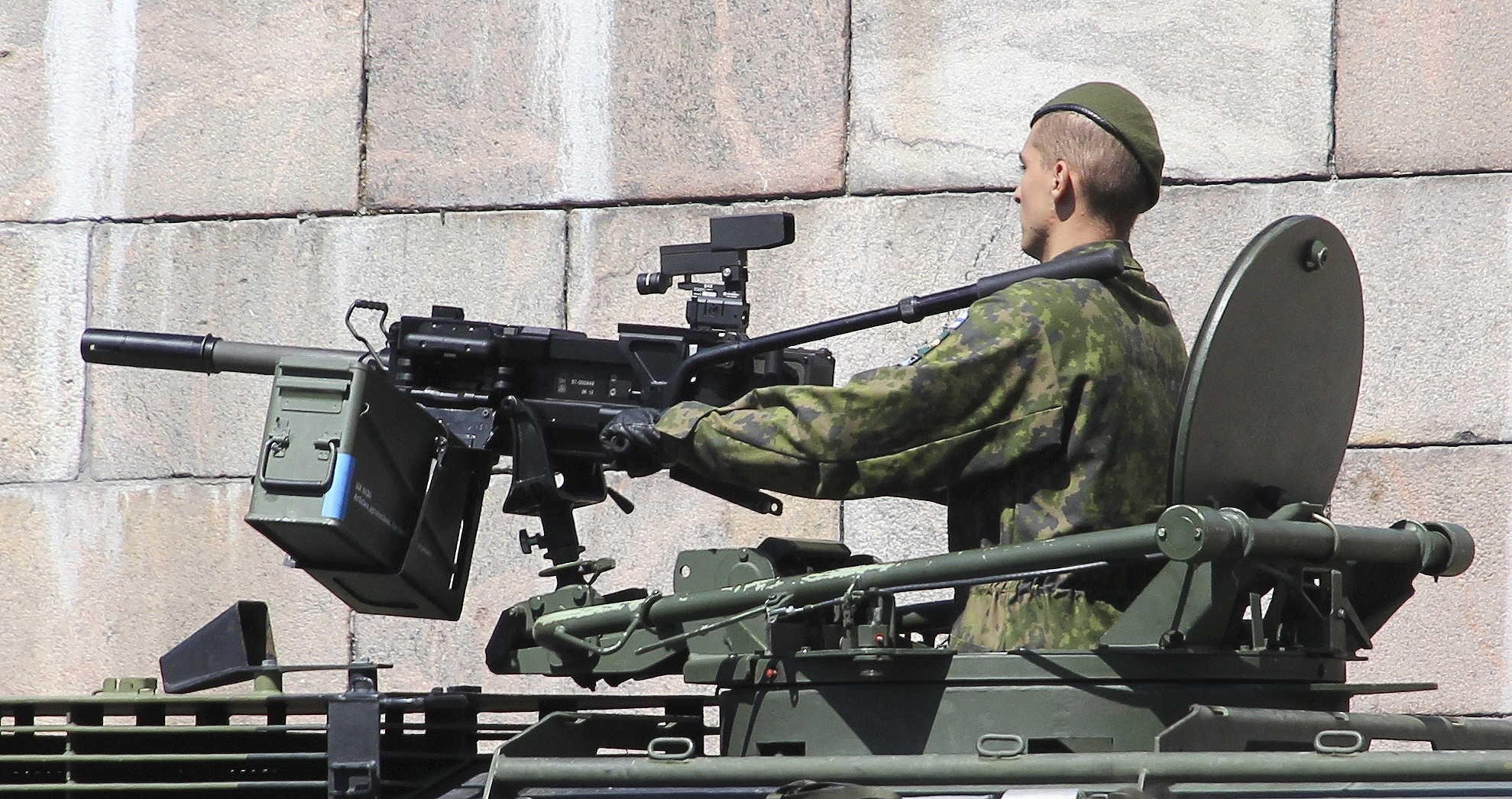
Manned GMG in Finnish service.

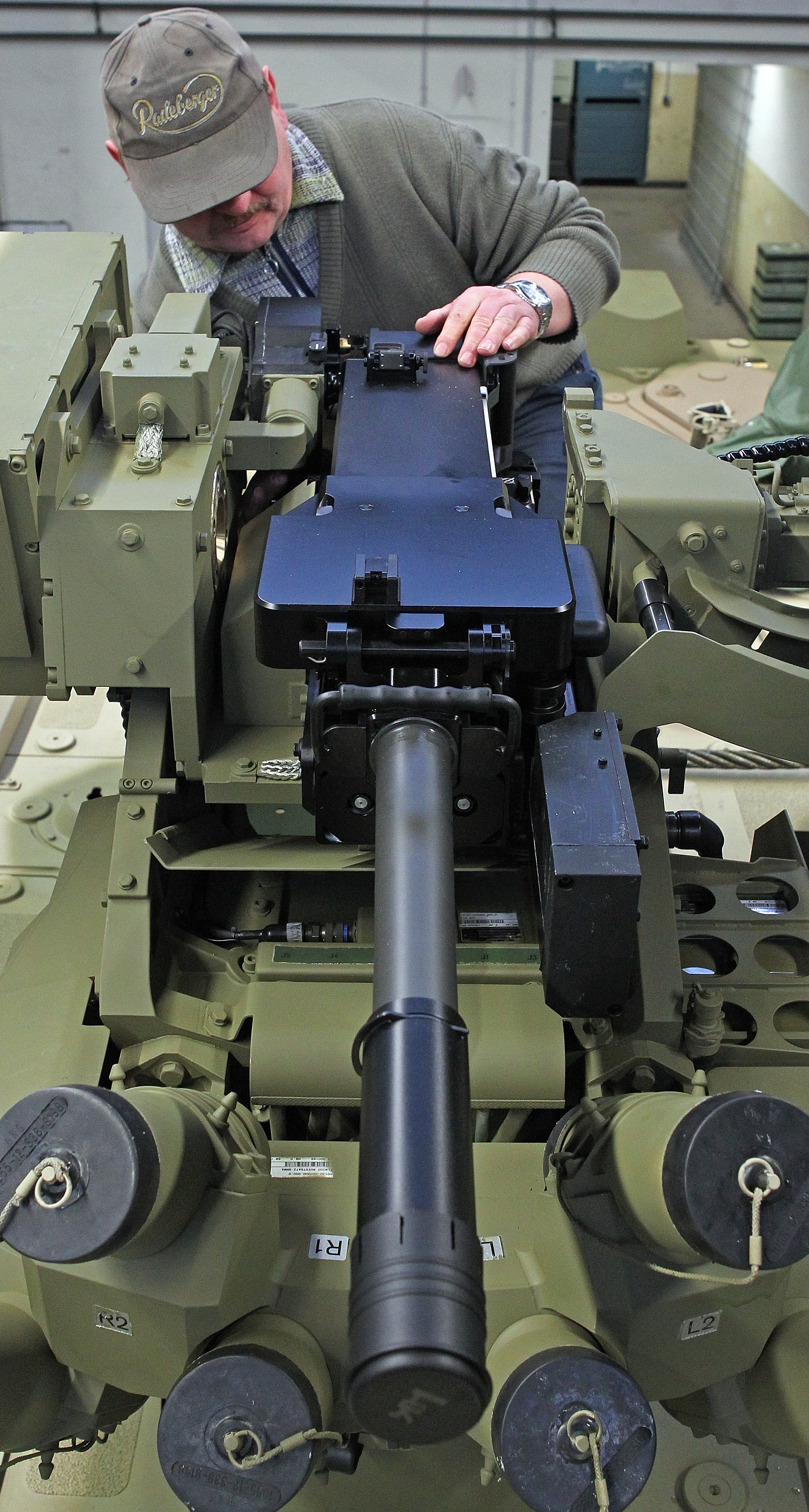
GMG remotely operated on board a GTK Boxer

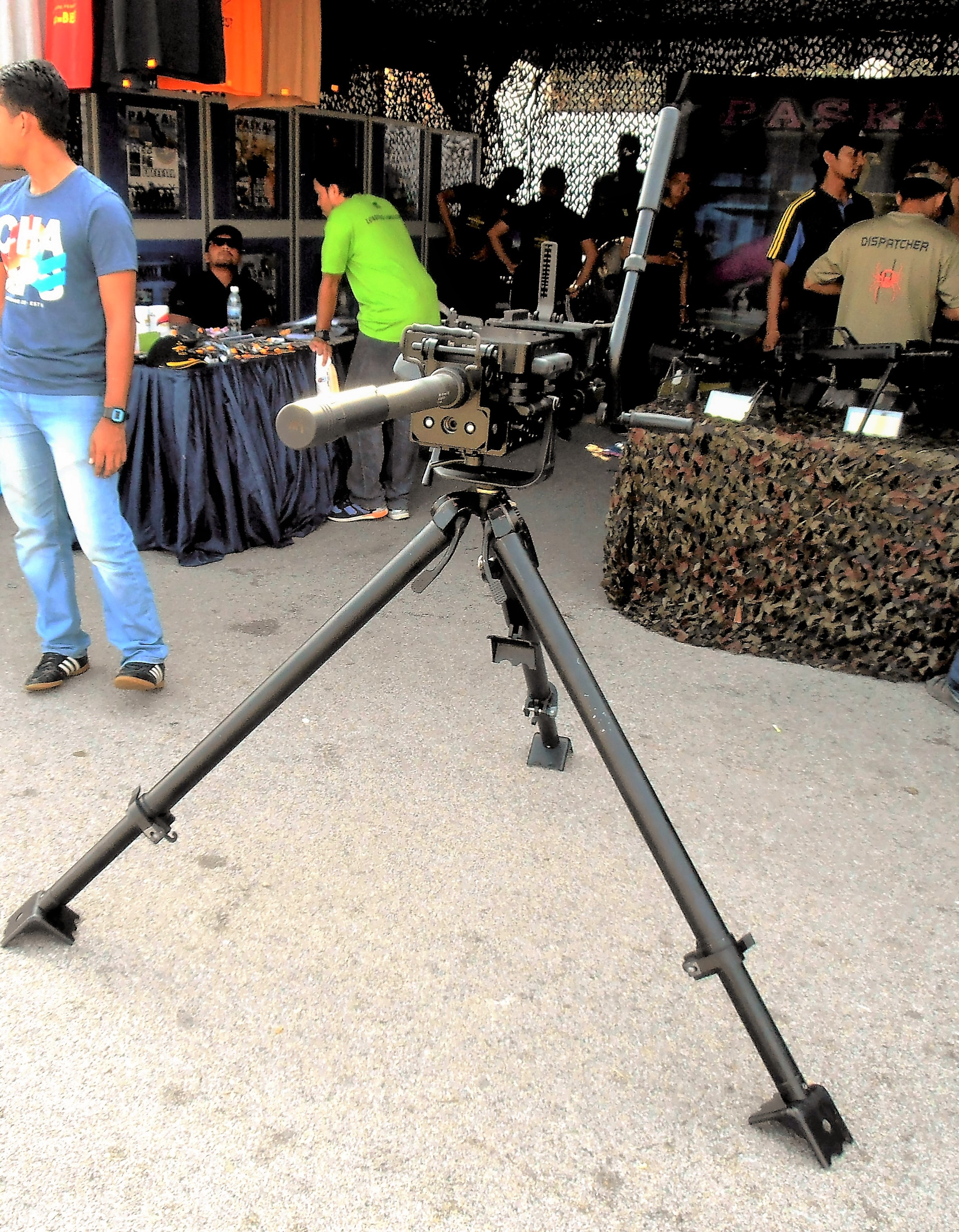
GMW/GMG of the Royal Malaysian Navy on display.

== See also ==
- List of API blowback firearms
- Comparison of automatic grenade launchers
