= Sea Mine 2000 =

Finnish naval stealth mine

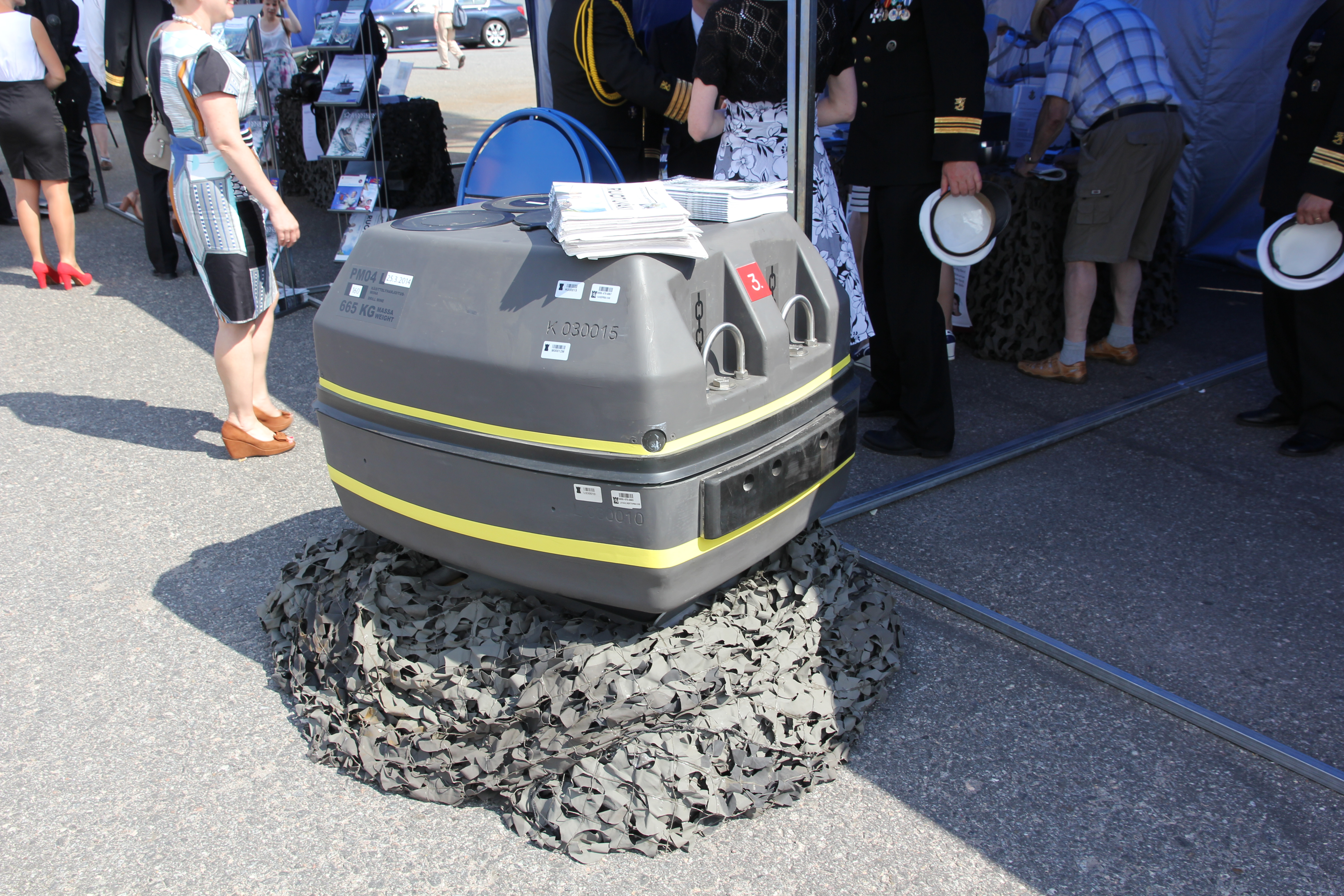
Sea Mine 2000 project result: bottom influence mine PM 04 used by the Finnish Navy

The Naval Mine 2000 (Finnish: Merimiina 2000) is an advanced naval mine developed by Patria for the Finnish Navy. It has stealth and advanced target-recognition capabilities and it is also being marketed elsewhere.

The mine detects the physical impulses of approaching vessels and can choose which ones are the most valuable ones. The Naval Mine 2000 project began in 1997 and the manufacturing was initiated in 2004. Deliveries for the Finnish Navy continued until 2008.
