= Newlands =

Newlands may refer to:

== Places ==
=== Australia ===
- Newlands, Queensland, a locality in the Whitsunday Region
- Newlands, Western Australia, a town in the Shire of Donnybrook–Balingup

=== Ireland ===
- Newlands Cross, Dublin, named after the former Newlands House estate

=== New Zealand ===
- Newlands, Wellington, a suburb of Wellington

=== South Africa ===
- Newlands, Cape Town, a suburb of Cape Town
- Newlands, Johannesburg, a suburb of Johannesburg
- Newlands, Pretoria, a suburb of Pretoria
- Newlands East, a township near Durban
- Newlands West, a township near Durban

=== United Kingdom ===
==== England ====
- Newlands, Allerdale, Cumbria, in Above Derwent
  - Newlands Valley, a valley in Cumbria
- Newlands, Eden, Cumbria
- Newlands, Derbyshire, a location
- Newlands, Hampshire
- Newlands, Milton Keynes
- Newlands, Northumberland
- Newlands, Nottinghamshire, a location
- Newlands, Staffordshire, a location
- Newlands Corner in Surrey

==== Northern Ireland ====
- Newlands, County Antrim, a townland in County Antrim

==== Scotland ====
- Newlands, Dumfries and Galloway, a location
- Newlands, Glasgow, an area of Glasgow
- Newlands, Highland, a location
- Newlands, Roxburghshire, a location in the Scottish Borders
- Newlands, Scottish Borders, Peeblesshire

=== Zimbabwe ===
- Newlands, Harare, a neighbourhood in the Eastern suburbs of Harare

== Other uses ==
- Newlands (surname)
- Newlands Cricket Ground, a cricket ground in Cape Town, South Africa
- Newlands House, a listed building in Bridgend, Scotland
- Newlands Stadium, a rugby and football stadium in Cape Town, South Africa
- Newlands Girls' School, Maidenhead, England
- Agnes Keith House, formerly known as Newlands, Sandakan, Borneo

== See also ==
- Newlands Resolution
- Newland (disambiguation)
- New Land (disambiguation)
- New states (disambiguation)
- New Country (disambiguation)
