= Nijland (surname) =

Nijland is a Dutch toponymic surname. Nijland, modern Dutch nieuw land means "new land", indicating that a person may have lived on newly recovered land or that he came from any number of places named such. Equivalent surnames are Dutch Nieuwland, Scandinavian Nyland, German Neuland, and English Newland. People named Nijland include:

- Albertus Antonie Nijland (1868–1936), Dutch astronomer
- Dorus Nijland (1880–1968), Dutch cyclist
- de:Maarten Nijland (born 1976), Dutch cyclist
- Stef Nijland (born 1988), Dutch footballer
- Stern Nijland (born 1976), Dutch illustrator

== See also ==
- Nijland, a town in Friesland
- Nijland, a lunar crater named after Albert A. Nijland
