= List of United Kingdom locations: New-Newl =

The United Kingdom

This is part of the list of United Kingdom locations: a gazetteer of place names in the United Kingdom showing each place's locality and geographical coordinates.

== New ==
=== New A-Newb ===
Location	Locality	Coordinates (links to map & photo sources)	OS grid reference
New Abbey	Dumfries and Galloway	54.97°N 03.62°W	NX9666
New Aberdour	Aberdeenshire	57.65°N 02.20°W	NJ8863
New Addington	Croydon	51.34°N 00.01°W	TQ3862
Newall	Leeds	53.91°N 01.69°W	SE2046
Newall Green	Manchester	53.37°N 02.28°W	SJ8187
New Alresford	Hampshire	51.08°N 01.17°W	SU5832
New Alyth	Perth and Kinross	56.60°N 03.23°W	NO2447
Newark	Cambridgeshire	52.58°N 00.21°W	TF2100
Newark	Orkney Islands	59.26°N 02.49°W	HY7242
Newark-on-Trent	Nottinghamshire	53.08°N 00.81°W	SK7953
New Arley	Warwickshire	52.49°N 01.57°W	SP2989
New Arram	East Riding of Yorkshire	53.88°N 00.43°W	TA0344
Newarthill	North Lanarkshire	55.80°N 03.94°W	NS7859
New Ash Green	Kent	51.36°N 00.29°E	TQ6065
New Balderton	Nottinghamshire	53.05°N 00.79°W	SK8152
Newball	Lincolnshire	53.27°N 00.39°W	TF0776
Newbarn	Kent	51.11°N 01.07°E	TR1539
New Barn	Kent	51.38°N 00.32°E	TQ6268
New Barnet	Barnet	51.63°N 00.18°W	TQ2695
New Barnetby	North Lincolnshire	53.57°N 00.38°W	TA0710
Newbarns	Cumbria	54.12°N 03.21°W	SD2170
New Barton	Northamptonshire	52.26°N 00.75°W	SP8564
New Basford	Nottinghamshire	52.97°N 01.18°W	SK5542
Newbattle	Midlothian	55.87°N 03.07°W	NT3365
New Beaupre	The Vale Of Glamorgan	51.44°N 03.44°W	ST0073
New Beckenham	Bromley	51.41°N 00.04°W	TQ3670
New Bewick	Northumberland	55.47°N 01.90°W	NU0620
Newbie	Dumfries and Galloway	54.97°N 03.28°W	NY1865
Newbiggin (Ainstable)	Cumbria	54.83°N 02.70°W	NY5549
Newbiggin (Dacre)	Cumbria	54.65°N 02.82°W	NY4729
Newbiggin (Kirkby Thore)	Cumbria	54.64°N 02.59°W	NY6228
Newbiggin (Furness)	Cumbria	54.11°N 03.13°W	SD2669
Newbiggin (Copeland)	Cumbria	54.33°N 03.40°W	SD0994
Newbiggin (Hutton Roof)	Cumbria	54.20°N 02.69°W	SD5579
Newbiggin (Teesdale)	Durham	54.63°N 02.14°W	NY9127
Newbiggin (Lanchester)	Durham	54.81°N 01.78°W	NZ1447
Newbiggin (South Wensleydale)	North Yorkshire	54.26°N 02.01°W	SD9985
Newbiggin (Askrigg)	North Yorkshire	54.31°N 02.07°W	SD9591
Newbiggin (Blanchland)	Northumberland	54.83°N 02.07°W	NY9549
Newbiggin-by-the-Sea	Northumberland	55.17°N 01.53°W	NZ3087
Newbigging (near Dundee)	Angus	56.50°N 02.83°W	NO4936
Newbigging (Inveraldie)	Angus	56.52°N 02.94°W	NO4237
Newbigging	City of Edinburgh	55.97°N 03.41°W	NT1277
Newbigging	Scottish Borders	55.42°N 02.47°W	NT7015
Newbigging	South Lanarkshire	55.68°N 03.57°W	NT0145
Newbiggings	Orkney Islands	59.25°N 02.59°W	HY6641
Newbiggin Hall Estate	Newcastle upon Tyne	54.99°N 01.68°W	NZ2067
Newbiggin-on-Lune	Cumbria	54.44°N 02.46°W	NY7005
New Bilton	Warwickshire	52.37°N 01.28°W	SP4975
Newbold	Derbyshire	53.25°N 01.44°W	SK3773
Newbold (North-west Leicestershire)	Leicestershire	52.76°N 01.40°W	SK4019
Newbold (Harborough)	Leicestershire	52.67°N 00.87°W	SK7609
Newbold	Rochdale	53.61°N 02.13°W	SD9113
Newbold Heath	Leicestershire	52.64°N 01.35°W	SK4405
Newbold-on-Avon	Warwickshire	52.38°N 01.28°W	SP4976
Newbold-on-Stour	Warwickshire	52.11°N 01.65°W	SP2446
Newbold Pacey	Warwickshire	52.21°N 01.57°W	SP2957
Newbolds	Wolverhampton	52.59°N 02.10°W	SJ9300
Newbold Verdon	Leicestershire	52.62°N 01.35°W	SK4403
New Bolingbroke	Lincolnshire	53.09°N 00.05°W	TF3057
New Bolsover	Derbyshire	53.22°N 01.31°W	SK4670
Newborough	Cambridgeshire	52.62°N 00.22°W	TF2005
Newborough (Niwbwrch)	Isle of Anglesey	53.15°N 04.36°W	SH4265
Newborough	Staffordshire	52.82°N 01.80°W	SK1325
New Boston	St Helens	53.46°N 02.66°W	SJ5697
New Botley	Oxfordshire	51.75°N 01.29°W	SP4906
Newbottle	Northamptonshire	52.02°N 01.24°W	SP5236
Newbottle	Sunderland	54.85°N 01.48°W	NZ3351
New Boultham	Lincolnshire	53.21°N 00.56°W	SK9670
Newbourne	Suffolk	52.03°N 01.30°E	TM2742
New Bradwell	Milton Keynes	52.06°N 00.80°W	SP8241
New Brancepeth	Durham	54.76°N 01.65°W	NZ2241
Newbridge	Bath and North East Somerset	51.38°N 02.40°W	ST7265
Newbridge	Caerphilly	51.66°N 03.14°W	ST2197
Newbridge (Kenwyn, near Truro)	Cornwall	50.25°N 05.10°W	SW7944
Newbridge (Callington, east Cornwall)	Cornwall	50.48°N 04.34°W	SX3468
Newbridge (Madron, west Cornwall)	Cornwall	50.12°N 05.61°W	SW4231
Newbridge	Dumfries and Galloway	55.09°N 03.66°W	NX9479
Newbridge	East Sussex	51.06°N 00.06°E	TQ4532
Newbridge	City of Edinburgh	55.93°N 03.41°W	NT1272
Newbridge	Hampshire	50.93°N 01.58°W	SU2915
Newbridge	Isle of Wight	50.68°N 01.42°W	SZ4187
Newbridge	Lancashire	53.83°N 02.22°W	SD8538
Newbridge	North Yorkshire	54.25°N 00.77°W	SE8085
Newbridge	Oxfordshire	51.70°N 01.42°W	SP4001
Newbridge	Shropshire	52.81°N 03.04°W	SJ3025
Newbridge	Wolverhampton	52.58°N 02.16°W	SO8999
Newbridge	Wrexham	52.96°N 03.07°W	SJ2841
Newbridge Green	Worcestershire	52.04°N 02.23°W	SO8439
Newbridge on Usk	Monmouthshire	51.64°N 02.89°W	ST3894
Newbridge-on-Wye	Powys	52.21°N 03.45°W	SO0158
New Brighton	Bradford	53.82°N 01.81°W	SE1236
New Brighton	Flintshire	53.17°N 03.12°W	SJ2565
New Brighton	Hampshire	50.84°N 00.93°W	SU7506
New Brighton	Leeds	53.73°N 01.60°W	SE2627
New Brighton	Wirral	53.42°N 03.05°W	SJ3093
New Brighton	Wrexham	53.04°N 03.09°W	SJ2750
New Brimington	Derbyshire	53.26°N 01.40°W	SK4074
New Brinsley	Nottinghamshire	53.04°N 01.33°W	SK4550
New Brotton	Redcar and Cleveland	54.57°N 00.94°W	NZ6820
Newbrough	Northumberland	54.99°N 02.20°W	NY8767
New Broughton	Wrexham	53.05°N 03.03°W	SJ3151
New Buckenham	Norfolk	52.46°N 01.06°E	TM0890
New Buildings	Bath and North East Somerset	51.31°N 02.44°W	ST6957
New Buildings	Dorset	50.61°N 02.01°W	SY9980
Newbuildings	Devon	50.81°N 03.71°W	SS7903
Newburgh	Aberdeenshire	57.31°N 02.01°W	NJ9925
Newburgh	Fife	56.34°N 03.24°W	NO2318
Newburgh	Lancashire	53.58°N 02.78°W	SD4810
Newburn	Newcastle upon Tyne	54.97°N 01.73°W	NZ1765
Newbury	Berkshire	51.40°N 01.32°W	SU4767
Newbury	Kent	51.29°N 00.75°E	TQ9259
Newbury	Somerset	51.24°N 02.44°W	ST6950
Newbury	Wiltshire	51.16°N 02.25°W	ST8241
New Bury	Bolton	53.54°N 02.40°W	SD7305
Newbury Park	Redbridge	51.57°N 00.07°E	TQ4488
Newby	Cumbria	54.58°N 02.63°W	NY5921
Newby	Lancashire	53.90°N 02.29°W	SD8145
Newby (Craven)	North Yorkshire	54.12°N 02.42°W	SD7270
Newby (Hambleton)	North Yorkshire	54.50°N 01.22°W	NZ5012
Newby (Huby)	North Yorkshire	53.91°N 01.60°W	SE2647
Newby (Skelton-on-Ure)	North Yorkshire	54.09°N 01.46°W	SE3567
Newby (Scarborough)	North Yorkshire	54.29°N 00.44°W	TA0190
Newby Bridge	Cumbria	54.26°N 02.96°W	SD3786
Newby Cote	North Yorkshire	54.12°N 02.41°W	SD7370
Newby East	Cumbria	54.91°N 02.82°W	NY4758
Newby Head	Cumbria	54.58°N 02.65°W	NY5821
New Byth	Aberdeenshire	57.57°N 02.30°W	NJ8254
Newby West	Cumbria	54.86°N 02.99°W	NY3653
Newby Wiske	North Yorkshire	54.27°N 01.44°W	SE3687

=== Newc ===
Location	Locality	Coordinates (links to map & photo sources)	OS grid reference
Newcastle	Bridgend	51.49°N 03.58°W	SS9079
Newcastle	Monmouthshire	51.84°N 02.81°W	SO4417
Newcastle	Shropshire	52.43°N 03.11°W	SO2482
Newcastle Emlyn	Carmarthenshire	52.03°N 04.47°W	SN3040
Newcastleton (Copshaw Holm)	Scottish Borders	55.17°N 02.81°W	NY4887
Newcastle-under-Lyme	Staffordshire	53.01°N 02.22°W	SJ8546
Newcastle upon Tyne		54.97°N 01.61°W	NZ2564
New Catton	Norfolk	52.64°N 01.29°E	TG2310
Newchapel	Pembrokeshire	52.02°N 04.59°W	SN2239
Newchapel	Powys	52.43°N 03.50°W	SN9883
Newchapel	City of Stoke-on-Trent	53.08°N 02.21°W	SJ8654
Newchapel	Surrey	51.16°N 00.05°W	TQ3642
New Charlton	Greenwich	51.48°N 00.01°E	TQ4078
New Cheltenham	South Gloucestershire	51.46°N 02.50°W	ST6574
New Cheriton	Hampshire	51.04°N 01.17°W	SU5828
Newchurch	Blaenau Gwent	51.78°N 03.21°W	SO1610
Newchurch	Carmarthenshire	51.89°N 04.35°W	SN3824
Newchurch	Herefordshire	52.14°N 02.95°W	SO3550
Newchurch	Isle of Wight	50.66°N 01.22°W	SZ5585
Newchurch	Kent	51.04°N 00.92°E	TR0531
Newchurch	Lancashire	53.69°N 02.27°W	SD8222
Newchurch	Monmouthshire	51.66°N 02.79°W	ST4597
Newchurch	Powys	52.14°N 03.15°W	SO2150
Newchurch	Staffordshire	52.80°N 01.79°W	SK1423
Newchurch in Pendle	Lancashire	53.84°N 02.27°W	SD8239
New Costessey	Norfolk	52.64°N 01.22°E	TG1810
Newcott	Devon	50.86°N 03.09°W	ST2308
New Coundon	Durham	54.66°N 01.66°W	NZ2230
New Cowper	Cumbria	54.79°N 03.37°W	NY1245
Newcraighall	Midlothian	55.92°N 03.08°W	NT3271
New Crofton	Wakefield	53.64°N 01.42°W	SE3817
New Cross	Lewisham	51.46°N 00.04°W	TQ3676
New Cross	Oxfordshire	51.49°N 00.90°W	SU7678
New Cross	Somerset	50.96°N 02.84°W	ST4119
New Cross Gate	Southwark	51.46°N 00.05°W	TQ3576
New Cumnock	East Ayrshire	55.39°N 04.19°W	NS6113

=== New D-New F ===
Location	Locality	Coordinates (links to map & photo sources)	OS grid reference
New Danna	Argyll and Bute	55.94°N 05.70°W	NR6979
New Deer	Aberdeenshire	57.50°N 02.20°W	NJ8846
New Delaval	Northumberland	55.10°N 01.54°W	NZ2979
New Delph	Oldham	53.56°N 02.03°W	SD9807
New Denham	Buckinghamshire	51.54°N 00.50°W	TQ0484
Newdigate	Surrey	51.16°N 00.29°W	TQ1942
New Downs (St Agnes)	Cornwall	50.31°N 05.23°W	SW7051
New Downs (St Just)	Cornwall	50.12°N 05.69°W	SW3631
New Duston	Northamptonshire	52.25°N 00.96°W	SP7162
New Earswick	York	53.98°N 01.08°W	SE6055
New Eastwood	Nottinghamshire	53.00°N 01.31°W	SK4646
New Edlington	Doncaster	53.47°N 01.20°W	SK5398
New Elgin	Moray	57.63°N 03.30°W	NJ2261
New Ellerby	East Riding of Yorkshire	53.83°N 00.23°W	TA1639
Newell Green	Berkshire	51.43°N 00.74°W	SU8771
New Eltham	Greenwich	51.42°N 00.07°E	TQ4472
New End	Lincolnshire	53.24°N 00.15°W	TF2374
New End	Warwickshire	52.23°N 01.85°W	SP1060
New End	Worcestershire	52.23°N 01.92°W	SP0560
Newenden	Kent	51.01°N 00.60°E	TQ8327
New England	Cambridgeshire	52.59°N 00.25°W	TF1801
New England	Essex	52.05°N 00.47°E	TL7042
New England	Lincolnshire	53.10°N 00.23°E	TF5059
New England	Somerset	50.88°N 02.96°W	ST3210
Newent	Gloucestershire	51.92°N 02.40°W	SO7225
Newerne	Gloucestershire	51.72°N 02.53°W	SO6303
New Farnley	Leeds	53.77°N 01.63°W	SE2431
New Ferry	Wirral	53.35°N 02.99°W	SJ3485
Newfield (Chester-le-Street)	Durham	54.86°N 01.62°W	NZ2452
Newfield (Bishop Auckland)	Durham	54.69°N 01.69°W	NZ2033
Newfield	Highland	57.76°N 04.05°W	NH7877
Newfield	City of Stoke-on-Trent	53.06°N 02.22°W	SJ8552
New Fletton	Cambridgeshire	52.55°N 00.24°W	TL1997
Newfound	Hampshire	51.25°N 01.17°W	SU5851
New Frankley	Birmingham	52.40°N 02.01°W	SO9978
New Fryston	Leeds	53.73°N 01.31°W	SE4527

=== Newg-New K ===
Location	Locality	Coordinates (links to map & photo sources)	OS grid reference
Newgale	Pembrokeshire	51.85°N 05.13°W	SM8422
New Galloway	Dumfries and Galloway	55.06°N 04.14°W	NX6377
Newgarth	Orkney Islands	59.05°N 03.30°W	HY2519
Newgate	Lancashire	53.53°N 02.74°W	SD5105
Newgate	Norfolk	52.94°N 01.04°E	TG0543
Newgate Corner	Norfolk	52.66°N 01.60°E	TG4413
Newgate Street	Hertfordshire	51.71°N 00.11°W	TL3004
New Greens	Hertfordshire	51.76°N 00.34°W	TL1409
New Grimsby	Isles of Scilly	49.95°N 06.35°W	SV8815
New Ground	Hertfordshire	51.78°N 00.62°W	SP9510
Newgrounds	Hampshire	50.92°N 01.75°W	SU1714
Newhailes	City of Edinburgh	55.93°N 03.09°W	NT3272
New Hainford	Norfolk	52.71°N 01.27°E	TG2118
Newhall	Cheshire	53.00°N 02.59°W	SJ6045
Newhall	Derbyshire	52.77°N 01.58°W	SK2820
Newhall Green	Warwickshire	52.47°N 01.61°W	SP2686
New Hall Hey	Lancashire	53.69°N 02.30°W	SD8022
Newham	Lincolnshire	53.03°N 00.09°W	TF2850
Newham	Northumberland	55.54°N 01.73°W	NU1728
New Hartley	Northumberland	55.07°N 01.53°W	NZ3076
Newhaven	Devon	50.97°N 04.29°W	SS3922
Newhaven	Derbyshire	53.13°N 01.76°W	SK1660
Newhaven	East Sussex	50.79°N 00.04°E	TQ4401
Newhaven	City of Edinburgh	55.98°N 03.20°W	NT2577
New Haw	Surrey	51.35°N 00.49°W	TQ0563
Newhay	North Yorkshire	53.76°N 01.00°W	SE6630
New Headington	Oxfordshire	51.75°N 01.20°W	SP5506
New Heaton	Northumberland	55.65°N 02.19°W	NT8840
New Hedges	Pembrokeshire	51.68°N 04.70°W	SN1302
New Herrington	Sunderland	54.86°N 01.48°W	NZ3352
Newhey	Oldham	53.59°N 02.10°W	SD9311
Newhill	Rotherham	53.48°N 01.35°W	SK4399
Newhills	City of Aberdeen	57.17°N 02.21°W	NJ8709
New Hinksey	Oxfordshire	51.73°N 01.26°W	SP5104
New Holkham	Norfolk	52.91°N 00.79°E	TF8839
New Holland	Bradford	53.81°N 01.87°W	SE0835
New Holland	North Lincolnshire	53.69°N 00.36°W	TA0823
Newholm	North Yorkshire	54.47°N 00.67°W	NZ8610
New Horwich	Derbyshire	53.31°N 01.98°W	SK0180
New Houghton	Derbyshire	53.18°N 01.26°W	SK4965
New Houghton (or Houghton)	Norfolk	52.81°N 00.65°E	TF7927
New House	Durham	54.74°N 02.20°W	NY8739
New House	Kent	51.42°N 00.34°E	TQ6372
Newhouse	North Lanarkshire	55.82°N 03.93°W	NS7961
Newhouse	Scottish Borders	55.49°N 02.76°W	NT5223
Newhousemill	South Lanarkshire	55.75°N 04.15°W	NS6553
Newhouses	Scottish Borders	55.68°N 02.78°W	NT5144
New Houses	North Yorkshire	54.15°N 02.30°W	SD8073
New Houses	Wigan	53.51°N 02.68°W	SD5502
New Hunwick	Durham	54.68°N 01.72°W	NZ1832
New Hutton	Cumbria	54.31°N 02.67°W	SD5691
New Hythe	Kent	51.30°N 00.43°E	TQ7059
Newick	East Sussex	50.97°N 00.01°E	TQ4121
Newingreen	Kent	51.08°N 01.02°E	TR1236
Newington	City of Edinburgh	55.92°N 03.18°W	NT2671
Newington (Folkestone and Hythe)	Kent	51.09°N 01.09°E	TR1737
Newington (Swale)	Kent	51.34°N 00.65°E	TQ8564
Newington (Thanet)	Kent	51.34°N 01.38°E	TR3666
Newington	Nottinghamshire	53.43°N 01.00°W	SK6693
Newington	Oxfordshire	51.65°N 01.13°W	SU6096
Newington	Shropshire	52.44°N 02.84°W	SO4383
Newington	Southwark	51.49°N 00.09°W	TQ3279
Newington Bagpath	Gloucestershire	51.64°N 02.27°W	ST8194
New Inn	Carmarthenshire	52.00°N 04.23°W	SN4736
New Inn	Devon	50.85°N 04.21°W	SS4408
New Inn	Monmouthshire	51.69°N 02.75°W	SO4800
New Inn	Torfaen	51.68°N 03.01°W	ST3099
New Invention	Shropshire	52.37°N 03.04°W	SO2976
New Invention	Walsall	52.60°N 02.04°W	SJ9701
New Kingston	Nottinghamshire	52.84°N 01.24°W	SK5128
New Kyo	Durham	54.85°N 01.73°W	NZ1751

=== New L ===
Location	Locality	Coordinates (links to map & photo sources)	OS grid reference
New Ladykirk	Scottish Borders	55.72°N 02.17°W	NT8948
New Lanark	South Lanarkshire	55.65°N 03.78°W	NS8842
Newland	Cumbria	54.20°N 03.07°W	SD3079
Newland	East Riding of Yorkshire	53.75°N 00.78°W	SE8029
Newland	Gloucestershire	51.77°N 02.65°W	SO5509
Newland	City of Kingston upon Hull	53.76°N 00.36°W	TA0831
Newland	North Yorkshire	53.71°N 00.95°W	SE6924
Newland	Oxfordshire	51.78°N 01.47°W	SP3610
Newland	Worcestershire	52.13°N 02.30°W	SO7948
Newland Bottom	Cumbria	54.21°N 03.09°W	SD2980
Newland Common	Worcestershire	52.23°N 02.14°W	SO9060
Newland Green	Kent	51.17°N 00.71°E	TQ9045
Newlandhead	Angus	56.54°N 02.84°W	NO4840
Newlandrig	Midlothian	55.84°N 03.02°W	NT3662
Newlands (Allerdale)	Cumbria	54.56°N 03.19°W	NY2320
Newlands (Eden)	Cumbria	54.74°N 03.02°W	NY3439
Newlands	Derbyshire	53.00°N 01.34°W	SK4446
Newlands	Dumfries and Galloway	55.14°N 03.63°W	NX9685
Newlands	City of Glasgow	55.81°N 04.28°W	NS5760
Newlands	Highland	57.47°N 04.08°W	NH7545
Newlands	Northumberland	54.89°N 01.84°W	NZ1055
Newlands	Nottinghamshire	53.15°N 01.14°W	SK5762
Newlands	Scottish Borders	55.48°N 02.74°W	NT5321
Newlands	Staffordshire	52.78°N 01.89°W	SK0721
Newlands Corner	Surrey	51.23°N 00.51°W	TQ0449
Newlandsmuir	South Lanarkshire	55.75°N 04.21°W	NS6153
Newlands of Geise	Highland	58.56°N 03.58°W	ND0865
Newlands of Tynet	Moray	57.63°N 03.05°W	NJ3761
Newlands Park	Isle of Anglesey	53.28°N 04.56°W	SH2980
New Lane	Lancashire	53.60°N 02.87°W	SD4212
New Lane End	Cheshire	53.44°N 02.55°W	SJ6394
New Langholm	Dumfries and Galloway	55.14°N 03.02°W	NY3584
Newlay	West Yorkshire	53.83°N 01.63°W	SE239367
New Leake	Lincolnshire	53.08°N 00.08°E	TF4056
New Leeds	Aberdeenshire	57.57°N 02.01°W	NJ9954
Newliston	City of Edinburgh	55.94°N 03.44°W	NT1073
Newliston (Kirkcaldy)	Fife	56.11°N 03.20°W	NT2592
New Lodge	Barnsley	53.57°N 01.48°W	SE3409
New Longton	Lancashire	53.71°N 02.75°W	SD5025
New Luce	Dumfries and Galloway	54.93°N 04.85°W	NX1764
Newlyn	Cornwall	50.09°N 05.55°W	SW4628
