= Nieuwland (surname) =

Nieuwland or Van Nieuwland is a Dutch toponymic surname meaning "(from) new land", indicating that a person may have lived on newly recovered land or that he came from any number of places named such. Archaic spellings include Nieuland, Nieulandt and Nijland. Equivalent surnames are Scandinavian Nyland, German Neuland, and English Newland. People named (van) Nieuwland include:

- Julius Nieuwland (1878–1936), Belgian-born American chemist and priest
- Nicolaas van Nieuwland (1510–1580), Dutch bishop of Haarlem and abbot of Egmond Abbey
- Pieter Nieuwland (1764–1794), Dutch nautical scientist, chemist, mathematician, and poet
- Rens Nieuwland (born 1953), Dutch jazz-guitarist
- Sandra van Nieuwland (born 1977), Dutch singer

(van) Nieuland(t)

- Adriaen van Nieulandt the younger (1587–1658), Dutch painter and engraver, brother of Willem
- Freddy Nieuland (1944–2008), Belgian drummer and pop rock singer
- Willem van Nieulandt II (1584–1635), Dutch painter and engraver, brother of Adriaen

== See also ==
- Six places in the Netherlands named Nieuwland
