= New Land =

New Land or variant may refer to:

- The New Land (1972 film), a Swedish film
- The New Land (1924 film), a German film
- The New Land (TV series), a 1974 American dramatic series
- New Land (magazine), an Australian magazine
- New Land (novel), a 1933 children's book by Sarah Lindsay Schmidt
- "New Land" (song), by Avatar, 2017
- Novaya Zemlya (English: New Land), a Russian archipelago in the Arctic Ocean
- Uusimaa (English: New Land), a region of Finland

== See also ==
- New Lands, a 1923 book by Charles Fort
- "New Lands" (song), a 2012 single by Justice
- New states (disambiguation)
- New Country (disambiguation)
- Newland (disambiguation)
- Newlands (disambiguation)
