= Nieuwland =

Nieuwland is the name of several Dutch villages:

- Nieuwland, Amersfoort, a neighbourhood of Amersfoort, in Utrecht
- Nieuwland, Brielle, a neighbourhood of Brielle, in South Holland
- Nieuwland, Schiedam, a neighbourhood of Schiedam, in South Holland
  - Schiedam Nieuwland metro station
- Nieuwland, Vijfheerenlanden in Utrecht
- Nieuwland, Zeeland in the province of Zeeland, now part of Nieuw- en Sint Joosland
- Former name of Vierpolders, in South Holland.

== See also ==
- Nieuwland (surname)
