= Project 50 =

Project 50 may refer to:

- HK50 of Heckler & Koch G36
- Soviet designation of the Riga-class frigates
- Project 50 of housing for the homeless spearheaded by American politician Zev Yaroslavsky
