= Sint Joosland =

Coordinates: 51.473157°N 3.659842°E

Sint Joosland is a former municipality in the Dutch province of Zeeland. It existed until 1816, when it was merged with Nieuwland to form the new municipality of Nieuw- en Sint Joosland. The municipality consisted of a single polder southeast of the current village of Nieuw- en Sint Joosland.
