= RY Persei =

Star in the constellation Perseus

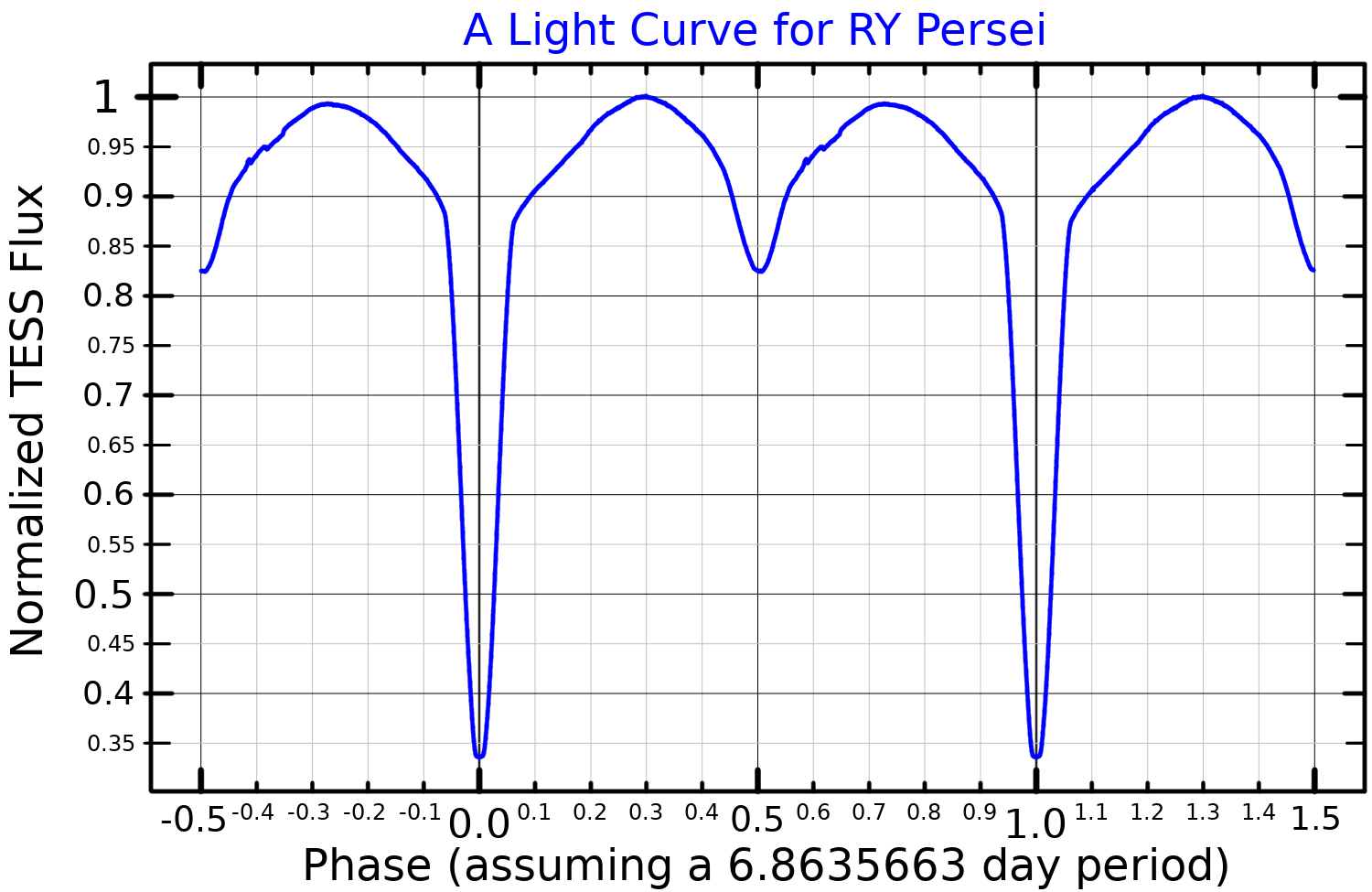
- A light curve for RY Persei, plotted from TESS data

Observation data Epoch J2000 Equinox ICRS
- Constellation: Perseus
- Right ascension: 02^{h} 45^{m} 42.123^{s}
- Declination: +48° 08′ 37.89″
- Apparent magnitude (V): 8.50 min_{1}: 10.25 min_{2}: 8.65

Characteristics
- Spectral type: B4 + F5III
- Variable type: Semidetached Algol

Astrometry
| Radial velocity (R_{v}) | −11.6±2.6 km/s |
| Proper motion (μ) | RA: 2.420 mas/yr Dec.: 2.680 mas/yr |
| Parallax (π) | 1.1026±0.0274 mas |
| Distance | 2,960 ± 70 ly (910 ± 20 pc) |
| Absolute magnitude (M_{V}) | −1.46/0.04 |

Orbit
| Period (P) | 6.863569 d |
| Semi-major axis (a) | 30.3±0.6 R_{☉} |
| Eccentricity (e) | 0.036±0.005 |
| Inclination (i) | 83.0° |
| Periastron epoch (T) | 2,451,467.15±0.10 HJD |
| Argument of periastron (ω) (secondary) | 75±7° |
| Argument of periastron (ω) (primary) | 255 (fixed)° |
| Semi-amplitude (K_{1}) (primary) | 47.3±3.9 km/s |
| Semi-amplitude (K_{2}) (secondary) | 174.5±0.9 km/s |

Details

Primary
| Mass | 6.25±0.16 M_{☉} |
| Radius | 4.06±0.14 R_{☉} |
| Luminosity | 1,630 L_{☉} |
| Surface gravity (log g) | 4.02 cgs |
| Temperature | 18,250 K |
| Rotational velocity (v sin i) | 280 km/s |

Secondary
| Mass | 1.60±0.10 M_{☉} |
| Radius | 8.10±0.17 R_{☉} |
| Luminosity | 95 L_{☉} |
| Surface gravity (log g) | 2.83 cgs |
| Temperature | 6,017 K |

Other designations
- RY Per, BD+47°692, HD 17034, HIP 12891, PPM 45447

Database references
| SIMBAD | data |

RY Persei is a variable star in the northern constellation of Perseus, abbreviated RY Per. It is an Algol variable with a period of 6.8635663 days, which indicates this is an eclipsing binary star system with an orbital plane oriented close to the line of sight from the Earth. The system has a maximum apparent visual magnitude of 8.50, which drops down to magnitude 10.25 during the eclipse of the primary component, then to 8.65 with the secondary eclipse. Based on parallax measurements, this system is located at a distance of approximately 2,960 light years from the Sun, but is drifting closer with a radial velocity of −12 km/s.

The variability of this system was reported by L. Tseraskaya in 1906. An orbital period of 6.864 d for this eclipsing binary was determined in 1913 based on a light curve from A. A. Nijland. W. A. Hiltner in 1946 found differing rotational velocities for the hydrogen and helium lines, suggesting that the former forms a slowly rotating envelope around the star. The data indicated that a stream of gas is being transferred from the cooler F5 class star to the hotter B4 component. The former displays the spectral characteristics of an evolved giant star.

The hot component was found to be rotating rapidly with a projected velocity of 280 km/s. This rotation is asynchronous with the orbital rotation rate. The system is understood to be a semidetached binary although close to being a full contact binary. The secondary component is the more evolved star and is filling its Roche lobe. The primary component was originally the less massive of the pair, but has since accreted mass from its partner. This transfer has caused the rapid spin up of the hotter star.

The primary component appears to be a B-type main-sequence star with a stellar classification of B4. It has 6.3 times the mass and 4 times the radius of the Sun. The star is spinning with a projected rotational velocity of 280 km/s and is being viewed from close to the equator. It is radiating 1,630 times the luminosity of the Sun from its photosphere at an effective temperature of 18,250 K. Separated from the primary by 30 times the radius of the Sun is the secondary partner. It is an F-type giant of class F5III. Presently it has 1.6 times the mass of the Sun but has expanded to 8.1 times the Sun's radius. This star is radiating 95 times the Sun's luminosity at a temperature of 6,017 K.
