= Uusimaa (disambiguation) =

Uusimaa is a region of Finland.

Uusimaa may also refer to:

== Places ==
- Uusimaa (constituency), an electoral district of Finland
- Uusimaa (historical province), a traditional linguistic-cultural provincial region, and defunct historical province of Sweden in present-day Finland
- Uusimaa and Häme County (Nyland and Tavastehus County), a former county of Sweden
- Uusimaa Province, a former province of Finland
- Eastern Uusimaa, a former region of Finland

== Ships ==
- Finnish gunboat Uusimaa, during World War II
- Finnish frigate Uusimaa, in Finnish Navy service 1964–1980
- FNS Uusimaa, a Hämeenmaa-class minelayer, built in 1992

== Other uses ==
- Uusimaa (newspaper), a daily newspaper

== See also ==
- Nyland (disambiguation) (Swedish for Uusimaa)
- Häme
- Udema, a type of warship built for the Swedish archipelago fleet
- Southern Finland
