= List of shipwrecks in February 1831 =

The list of shipwrecks in February 1831 includes ships sunk, foundered, grounded, or otherwise lost during February 1831.

== 1 February ==
List of shipwrecks: 1 February 1831
Ship	State	Description
Alexander	United Kingdom	The sloop was driven ashore in the Mull of Galloway, Ayrshire.
Ann	United Kingdom	The ship was driven ashore at Milford Haven, Pembrokeshire. Her crew were rescued. She was on a voyage from Dartmouth, Devon to Liverpool, Lancashire.
Beer & Wyngett	United Kingdom	The ship was driven ashore near Saltfleet, Lincolnshire. She was on a voyage from Gallipoli, Ottoman Empire to Hull, Yorkshire.
Bell	United Kingdom	The ship was wrecked at Dundee, Forfarshire.
Cygnet	United Kingdom	The ship was driven ashore near Saltfleet.
Dwyna	United Kingdom	The collier, a brig, was wrecked at Bridlington, Yorkshire with the loss of all eight of her crew.
Endeavour	United Kingdom	The sloop was driven ashore and wrecked at Boulby, North Riding of Yorkshire.
Fame	United Kingdom	The brig was wrecked near Rye, Sussex with the loss of all hands. She was on a voyage from Sciacca, Sicily to London.
Gleaner	United Kingdom	The schooner was driven ashore at Cambois, Northumberland with the loss of four of her six crew.
Helen	United Kingdom	The schooner was driven ashore and wrecked 2 nautical miles (3.7 km) east of Queensferry, Lothian with the loss of all hands.
Henry	United Kingdom	The ship was driven ashore near Saltfleet.
Hibberts	(United Kingdom of Great Britain and Ireland) British North America	The ship was driven ashore 2 leagues (6 nautical miles (11 km) south of Porto, Portugal. Her crew had abandoned her in the Atlantic in October 1830.
Industry	United Kingdom	The smack was driven ashore near Saltfleet.
Jarman	United Kingdom	The ship was driven ashore near Saltfleet. She was on a voyage from London to Selby, Yorkshire. Jarman had been refloated by 15 February and taken in to Hull.
Maid of the Mill	(United Kingdom of Great Britain and Ireland) New South Wales	The schooner capsized off Nobbys Island. Her four crew were rescued.
Margerie	United Kingdom	The ship was driven ashore and wrecked at "Achabone". She was on a voyage from Belfast, County Antrim to Irvine, Ayrshire.
Mark & Ann	United Kingdom	The ship was driven ashore near Saltfleet.
Mary	United Kingdom	The brig was wrecked at Auchmuthie, Forfarshire with the loss of all seven crew. She was on a voyage from Aberdeen to Sunderland.
Mearns	United Kingdom	The ship was driven ashore near Saltfleet. She was on a voyage from London to York. Mearns had been refloated by 15 February and taken in to Wainfleet, Lincolnshire.
Newcastle	United Kingdom	The ship was driven ashore at North Berwick, Lothian. All on board were rescued. She was on a voyage from Newcastle upon Tyne, Northumberland to Aberdeen.
Peggy and Jenny	United Kingdom	The brig was driven ashore in the Mull of Galloway.
Petrel	United Kingdom	The ship was driven ashore and wrecked at South Shields, County Durham.
Providence	United Kingdom	The ship ran aground at Blyth and was abandoned by her crew.
Rambler	United Kingdom	The ship was driven ashore at Great Yarmouth, Norfolk. Her crew were rescued. She was on a voyage from Gainsborough, Lincolnshire to London. Rambler was later refloated.
Robert and Jean	United Kingdom	The ship was driven ashore and wrecked in Kilkenny Bay. She was on a voyage from Dublin to Liverpool.
Robert and Mary	United Kingdom	The barge was wrecked at Dundee.
St Charles	France	The ship was driven ashore east of Dungeness, Kent, United Kingdom and sank with the loss of six of her crew. She was on a voyage from Tréguier, Côtes-du-Nord to Dunkirk, Nord.
Stranger	United Kingdom	The ship was driven ashore near Saltfleet.
Surprize	United Kingdom	The ship foundered in the North Sea off Peterhead, Aberdeenshire with the loss of all hands. She was on a voyage from Belfast, County Antrim to London.
Treore	United Kingdom	The ship was driven ashore near Sunderland. Her crew were rescued.
Union	United Kingdom	The ship was driven ashore and wrecked at South Shields.
Venus	United Kingdom	The ship was driven ashore at Great Yarmouth. Her crew were rescued. She was on a voyage from London to Leeds, Yorkshire. Venus was refloated on 3 February.
Vulcan	United Kingdom	The ship was driven ashore at Rye, Sussex.

== 2 February ==
List of shipwrecks: 2 February 1831
Ship	State	Description
Argo	United Kingdom	The ship was wrecked on the Herd Sand, in the North Sea off Hartlepool, County Durham.
Alfred	United Kingdom	The ship was driven ashore and wrecked near Bamburgh, Northumberland.
Amelia	United Kingdom	The ship was driven ashore near Hartlepool. Her crew were rescued. She was on a voyage from South Shields, County Durham to Guernsey, Channel Islands.
Boston Packet	United Kingdom	The ship was driven ashore near Ryhope, County Durham. Her crew were rescued.
Commerce	United Kingdom	The brig was driven ashore at Warkworth. Northumberland. Her crew were rescued.
Diamond	United Kingdom	The ship was driven ashore at Leith, Lothian. Her crew were rescued. She was on a voyage from Portsmouth, Hampshire to Sunderland, County Durham.
Duke of Kent	United Kingdom	The smack was driven ashore at Warkworth. Her crew were either rescued, or lost.
Enterprize	United Kingdom	The ship capsized in the North Sea off Blyth, Northumberland with the loss of all hands.
Flora	United Kingdom	The brig was driven ashore at Warkworth. Her crew were either rescued, or lost.
Friore	United Kingdom	The ship was driven ashore at Sunderland, County Durham.
Good Intent	United Kingdom	The collier was wrecked on the Herd Sand. Her crew were rescued.
Humility	(United Kingdom of Great Britain and Ireland) Jersey	The ship was driven ashore in Whitburn Bay.
Isabella	United Kingdom	The ship was driven ashore at Hendon, County Durham.
Jane	United Kingdom	The ship was driven onto the Seaton Rocks, County Durham and wrecked. Her crew were rescued.
Juno	United Kingdom	The brig was driven ashore and wrecked at St Monans, Fife with the loss of all but one of her crew. She was on a voyage from Hull, Yorkshire to Newcastle upon Tyne, Northumberland.
Lilley	United Kingdom	The ship was driven ashore at Hendon.
Mary Ann	United Kingdom	The brig was driven ashore at Warkworth with the loss of a crew member
Masham	United Kingdom	The ship was driven ashore near Hartlepool with the loss of two of her crew.
Peterel	United Kingdom	The ship was driven ashore near Hartlepool. Her crew were rescued.
Prince Regent	United Kingdom	The collier was driven ashore and wrecked near Hartlepool. Her crew were rescued.
Romulus and Regulus	United Kingdom	The ship was driven ashore in Whitsand Bay.
Samuel	United Kingdom	The brig was driven ashore at Warkworth. Her crew were rescued.
Stockton Packet	United Kingdom	The ship was driven ashore near Ryhope. Her crew were rescued.
Thomas and Mary	United Kingdom	The brig was driven ashore at Warkworth with the loss of a crew member.
Union	United Kingdom	The ship was driven ashore near Hartlepool. Her crew were rescued.
Venus	United Kingdom	The brig was driven ashore at Warkworth. Her crew were rescued.
Webster	United Kingdom	The schooner was driven ashore at Warkworth. Her crew were rescued.
William	United Kingdom	The ship was wrecked on the Herd Sand. Her crew were rescued.
William and Henry	United Kingdom	The ship foundered in the North Sea off Spurn Point, Yorkshire with the loss of all hands. She was on a voyage from North Shields to London.
William and Mary	United Kingdom	The sloop foundered in the North Sea off Whitby, Yorkshire with the loss of all hands.

== 3 February ==
List of shipwrecks: 3 February 1831
Ship	State	Description
Apollo	United Kingdom	The ship ran aground on the Sunk Sand, in the Humber. She was on a voyage from Rotterdam, South Holland, Netherlands to Hull, Yorkshire. Apollo was refloated on 11 February and taken in to Hull.
Britannia	United Kingdom	The ship foundered in the North Sea off Bridlington, Yorkshire.
James Anderson	United Kingdom	The ship was driven ashore and wrecked at Blyth, Northumberland.
Jean	United Kingdom	The ship was driven ashore near Great Yarmouth, Norfolk. Her crew were rescued. She was on a voyage from Great Yarmouth to Stirling. Jean was later refloated.
Young Husband	United Kingdom	The collier foundered in the North Sea off Alnmouth, Northumberland with the loss of all hands.

== 4 February ==
List of shipwrecks: 4 February 1831
Ship	State	Description
Ann	United Kingdom	The ship was driven ashore and wrecked at Rosto do Cão, Azores, Portugal. Her crew were rescued.
Arundel	United Kingdom	The ship was driven ashore at Dunbar, Lothian. Her crew were rescued. She was on a voyage from Arundel, Sussex to South Shields, County Durham.
Belvidera	United Kingdom	The ship was driven ashore and wrecked at Seaton Sluice, County Durham. Her crew were rescued.
Brothers	United Kingdom	The smack was driven ashore and wrecked at Dunbar with the loss of all hands.
Commerce	United Kingdom	The brig was wrecked on the Ribble Bank, in Liverpool Bay. She was on a voyage from Saint John, New Brunswick, British North America to Liverpool, Lancashire.
Corsican	United Kingdom	The brig was driven ashore and wrecked 3 nautical miles (5.6 km) north of Berwick upon Tweed, Northumberland. Her crew were rescued. She was on a voyage from Aberdeen to Southampton, Hampshire.
Czar	United Kingdom	The smack was driven ashore and wrecked at Dunbar with the loss of 27 lives. She was on a voyage from London to Leith, Lothian.
Dolly	United Kingdom	The ship was driven ashore on the Goodwick Sands, Pembrokeshire. She was on a voyage from Chester, Cheshire to Swansea, Glamorgan.
Hester	United Kingdom	The ship was wrecked at "Requexado" with the loss of all but her captain. She was on a voyage from Plymouth, Devon to "Requexado".
Johanna	Netherlands	The ship was driven ashore and wrecked at Nieuwland, Zeeland. She was on a voyage from Vlissingen, Zeeland to Antwerp, Belgium.
Newcastle	United Kingdom	The ship was driven ashore at Berwick upon Tweed. Her crew were rescued.
Scilly	United Kingdom	The brig was driven ashore and wrecked at Seacliff, Lothian. All six crew were rescued. She was on a voyage from Arundel to South Shields.
Trident	United Kingdom	The ship ran aground on the Herd Sand. Her crew were rescued by the South Shields Lifeboat. Trident broke up on 7 February.

== 5 February ==
List of shipwrecks: 5 February 1831
Ship	State	Description
Fame	United Kingdom	The ship was driven ashore at Pakefield, Suffolk. Her crew were rescued. She was on a voyage from Sunderland, County Durham to London.
Frances	United Kingdom	The ship was wrecked on Barbuda. All on board were rescued. She was on a voyage from Liverpool, Lancashire to New Orleans, Louisiana, United States.
George & William	United Kingdom	The ship ran aground on the Herd Sand, in the North Sea off Hartlepool, County Durham. She was refloated on 14 February and taken in to North Shields, County Durham.
HNLM Gunboat No. 2	Royal Netherlands Navy	Belgian Revolution: The gunboat ran aground in the Scheldt at Fort St. Lawrence, Antwerp, Belgium and was boarded by twelve Belgian Free Corps soldiers, who wished her captain to surrender. The boat was scuttled by the detonation of her magazine with the loss of 30 of her 32 crew and all Belgian Free Corps members that were aboard, 42 lives in total.
Jupiter	United Kingdom	The ship was abandoned in the North Sea off Lowestoft, Suffolk.
Venus	United Kingdom	The ship sank at Margate, Kent.

== 6 February ==
List of shipwrecks: 6 February 1831
Ship	State	Description
Fame	United Kingdom	The ship foundered in the North Sea off Pakefield, Suffolk. Her crew were rescued.
Isabella	United Kingdom	The ship ran aground off Great Ganilly, Isles of Scilly. She was on a voyage from Aberdeen to Liverpool, Lancashire.

== 7 February ==
List of shipwrecks: 7 February 1831
Ship	State	Description
Alfred	United Kingdom	The ship was wrecked south of North Sunderland, County Durham.
Caroline	United Kingdom	The ship was driven ashore and severely damaged at Hartlepool, County Durham. Her crew were rescued.
Friendship	United Kingdom	The ship was driven ashore at Hartlepool. Her crew were rescued.
Mary and Susan	United Kingdom	The ship struck The Manacles and sank. She was on a voyage from Poole, Dorset to Liverpool, Lancashire.
Progress	United Kingdom	The ship was driven ashore and severely damaged at Hartlepool. Her crew were rescued.
Shylock	United Kingdom	The ship departed from St. Ives, Cornwall for Swansea, Glamorgan. No further trace, presumed foundered with the loss of all hands.

== 9 February ==
List of shipwrecks: 9 February 1831
Ship	State	Description
Mary Ann	United Kingdom	The ship was driven ashore and wrecked at Castletown, Isle of Man. She was on a voyage from Drogheda, County Louth to Runcorn, Cheshire.

== 10 February ==
List of shipwrecks: 10 February 1831
Ship	State	Description
Swan	United Kingdom	The ship ran aground in Glenluce Bay. She was on a voyage from Dundalk, County Louth to Glasgow, Renfrewshire.

== 12 February ==
List of shipwrecks: 12 February 1831
Ship	State	Description
Anna	Denmark	The ship was wrecked on Skagen. Her crew were rescued. She was on a voyage from Messina, Sicily to Copenhagen.
Hero	United Kingdom	The ship was driven ashore and sunk at Port Soderick, Isle of Man. Both crew members survived.
Terry	United Kingdom	The brig was driven ashore west of Douglas Head, Isle of Man.

== 13 February ==
List of shipwrecks: 13 February 1831
Ship	State	Description
Lavinia	United Kingdom	The brig ran aground on the Whitton Sand, in the North Sea and sank. Her crew were rescued. She was on a voyage from London to Goole, Yorkshire.
Mary	United Kingdom	The ship was driven ashore in Loch Indaal. She was on a voyage from Tralee, County Kerry to Liverpool, Lancashire.

== 14 February ==
List of shipwrecks: 14 February 1831
Ship	State	Description
Barrick	United Kingdom	The ship was driven ashore near Wexford. She was on a voyage from Pictou, Nova Scotia, British North America to Belfast, County Down.

== 15 February ==
List of shipwrecks: 15 February 1831
Ship	State	Description
Marcella	United Kingdom	The ship was wrecked near Key West, Florida, United States. She was on a voyage from New Orleans, Louisiana, United States to Greenock, Renfrewshire.
Swift	United Kingdom	The ship was wrecked off Castletown, Isle of Man.
William Mabb	United Kingdom	The ship was wrecked at the entrance to the Dardanelles. She was on a voyage from Livorno, Grand Duchy of Tuscany to Constantinople, Ottoman Empire.

== 17 February ==
List of shipwrecks: 17 February 1831
Ship	State	Description
Idus	United Kingdom	The ship was driven ashore in Bootle Bay. She was on a voyage from Savannah, Georgia, United States to Liverpool, Lancashire.

== 19 February ==
List of shipwrecks: 19 February 1831
Ship	State	Description
Folgerdinga	Netherlands	The ship was wrecked on Eierland, North Holland with the loss of all but her captain. She was on a voyage from Stockholm, Sweden to Harlingen, Friesland.
Mary Ann	United Kingdom	The brig was lost in the Pacific Ocean 14 to 30 nautical miles (26 to 56 km) off Valparaíso, Chile. Her crew were rescued. She was on a voyage from Liverpool, Lancashire to Valparaíso.

== 20 February ==
List of shipwrecks: 20 February 1831
Ship	State	Description
Betsey	United Kingdom	The ship collided with Columbia (United States) in the English Channel off Hastings, Sussex and sank. Her crew were rescued but a sailor from Columbia was drowned. Betsey was on a voyage from Ipswich, Suffolk to Liverpool, Lancashire.
Orion	United Kingdom	The ship was wrecked at Larne, County Antrim. She was on a voyage from Alicante, Spain to Belfast, County Down.

== 21 February ==
List of shipwrecks: 21 February 1831
Ship	State	Description
Friends	United Kingdom	The ship capsized at Newcastle upon Tyne, Northumberland.

== 22 February ==
List of shipwrecks: 22 February 1831
Ship	State	Description
Carl	Sweden	The ship sprang a leak and was abandoned in the English Channel. She was on a voyage from Stockholm to Bordeaux, Gironde, France
Oak	United Kingdom	The ship was driven ashore at Sunderland, County Durham. She was on a voyage from King's Lynn, Norfolk to Sunderland.

== 23 February ==
List of shipwrecks: 23 February 1831
Ship	State	Description
Speedwell	United Kingdom	The sloop departed from Girvan, Ayrshire for Liverpool, Lancashire. She subsequently foundered in Woodland Bay with the loss of all five people on board.

== 25 February ==
List of shipwrecks: 25 February 1831
Ship	State	Description
Globe	United Kingdom	The ship capsized in the River Severn at Gloucester with the loss of her captain. She was on a voyage from Bordeaux, Gironde, France to Gloucester.

== 27 February ==
List of shipwrecks: 27 February 1831
Ship	State	Description
Byron	United Kingdom	The brig foundered in the Firth of Clyde off Ailsa Craig. She was on a voyage from Troon, Ayrshire to an Irish port.

== 28 February ==
List of shipwrecks: 28 February 1831
Ship	State	Description
Industry	(United Kingdom of Great Britain and Ireland) New South Wales	The sealing brig was wrecked at "Easy Harbour", Stewart Island, New Zealand, with the loss of seventeen of the nineteen people on board. The ship had been operating at Codfish Island and moved to take shelter on the larger Stewart Island due to an oncoming storm. The crew, not expecting the command to sail, had become intoxicated, and the combination if poor handling and a rising sea led to the Industry running aground.

== Unknown date ==
List of shipwrecks: Unknown date 1831
Ship	State	Description
Anne	United Kingdom	The schooner was wrecked on the Ox Scarrs with the loss of all hands.
Anson	United Kingdom	The ship was driven ashore at Kinghorn, Fife before 3 February.
Elizabeth and Mary	(United Kingdom of Great Britain and Ireland) New South Wales	The schooner was wrecked on the coast of New Zealand. Her crew were rescued.
Enterprize	United Kingdom	The barque ran aground on the Drum Sand, in the Firth of Forth off Cramond, Lothian.
Fame	United Kingdom	The brig foundered in the Irish Sea off Point of Ayre, Isle of Man.
Flor de Amizade	Portugal	The ship was lost near Pará, Brazil before 2 February.
Gaspee	United Kingdom	The ship was wrecked on Heneaga, Bahamas.
Gilbert Ruggles	United Kingdom	The ship was driven ashore at the mouth of the Arno before 11 February.
Mary Ann	United Kingdom	The ship was wrecked on the north west coast of Ireland. She was on a voyage from Liverpool, Lancashire to Galway.
Peter & Jane	United Kingdom	The ship was driven ashore and damaged at Bridlington, Yorkshire. She was refloated on 26 February and taken in to Bridlington. Peter & Jane was on a voyage from Hull, Yorkshire to Newcastle upon Tyne, Northumberland.
Sarah	United Kingdom	The ship was holed by an anchor and sank at Milford Haven, Pembrokeshire.
