= Finnish frigate Hämeenmaa =

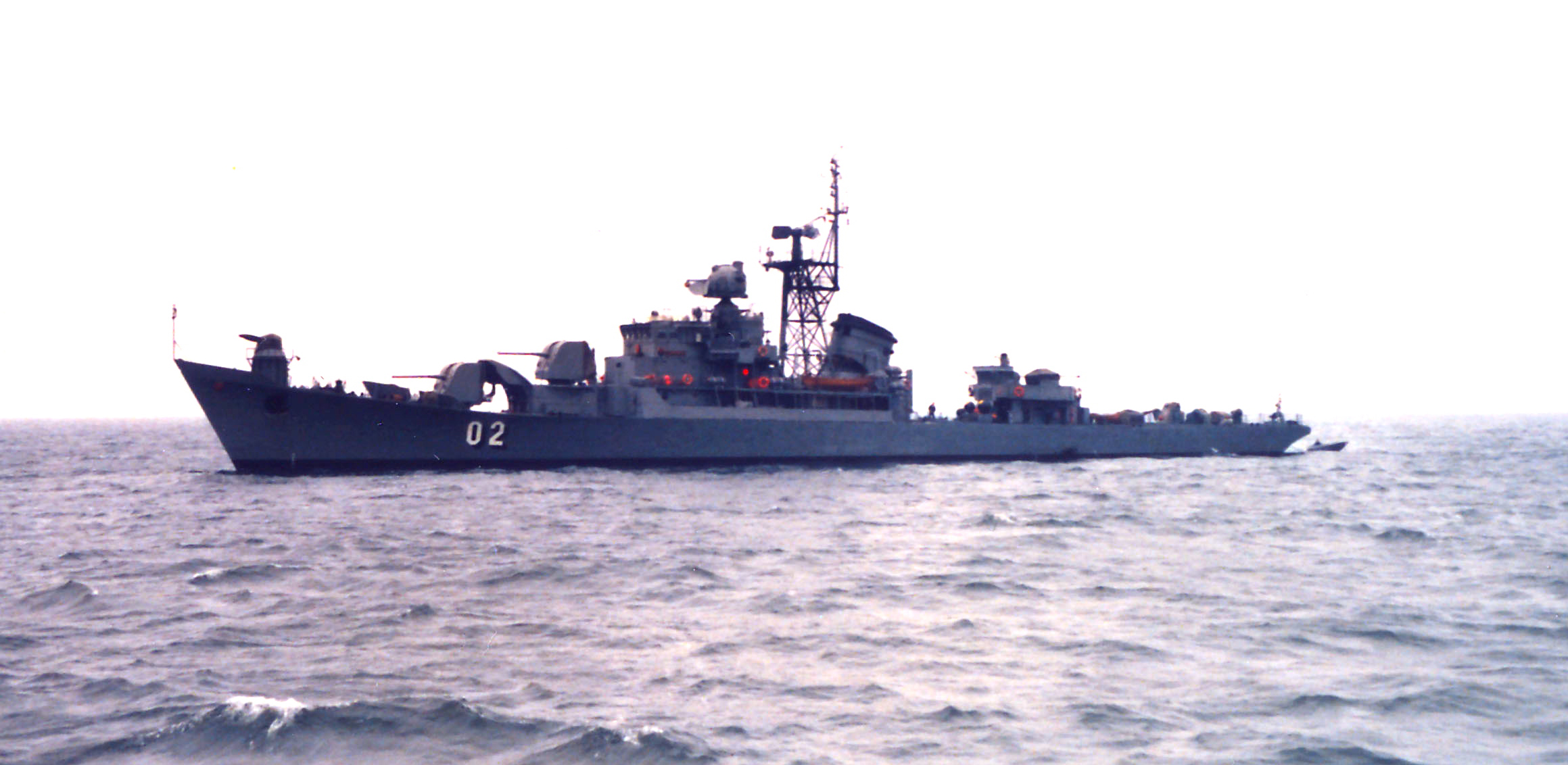
- Hämeenmaa in 1983, somewhere in the Gulf of Finland

History

Soviet Union
- Name: SKR-69
- Builder: Yantar, Kaliningrad
- Yard number: 125
- Laid down: 29 July 1956
- Launched: 28 December 1956
- Completed: 12 June 1957
- Fate: Sold to Finland, 1964

Finland
- Name: Hämeenmaa
- Commissioned: 1964
- Decommissioned: 1985
- Fate: Scrapped 1986

General characteristics
- Class & type: Hämeenmaa class; (modified Riga-class frigate)
- Displacement: 1,260 tons; 1,500 tons (full load)
- Length: 91.5 m (300 ft)
- Beam: 10.1 m (33 ft)
- Draft: 3.2 m (10 ft)
- Propulsion: steam turbines, 14,900 kW (20,000 hp)
- Speed: 28 knots (52 km/h)
- Range: 2,000 nautical miles (3,700 km) at 15 knots (28 km/h; 17 mph)
- Complement: 175
- Armament: three 100 mm guns; two 2 × 37 mm AA guns; two 2 × 25 mm AA guns; two Hedgehog ASW mortars; one 3 × 533 mm torpedo tubes

Hämeenmaa was a Finnish Riga-class frigate. The class was called the Hämeenmaa class in Finland since the ship had some unique modifications (i.e. British submarine hunting equipment). The two 37 mm twin guns were also replaced with two 40 mm single AA guns in 1975.

Hämeenmaa was rebuilt into a minelayer in the 1980s. A communications central replaced the Hedgehog mounting. The torpedo tubes were removed. A bow twin 30 mm AK-230 was added. Hämeenmaa was decommissioned in 1985.

== Operational service ==
The Hämeenmaas were acquired from the Soviet Union in the mid-1960s, to be used as gun training ships. They formed the "Escort Flotilla" (Finnish: Saattajalaivue) together with the Nuoli-class fast gunboats.

The commissioning of Turunmaa and Karjala in the late 1960s led however to personnel shortages in the Finnish Navy (Finland had a naval manpower restriction after World War II) and the navy was forced to limit the use of its two Hämeenmaa frigates. They were initially used one at a time and finally decided to retire them.

Hämeenmaa was in Finnish Navy service between 1964–1985. The sister ship Uusimaa was decommissioned in 1979 and cannibalized for spare parts for Hämeenmaa. Both ships had already served a few years in the Soviet Navy before sale to Finland.
