= Neuland (disambiguation) =

Neuland is a typeface designed in 1923.

Neuland (German for new land) may also refer to:

== Places ==
- Neuland, Hamburg, quarter in the German city of Hamburg
- Neuland Lighthouse, lighthouse in Schleswig-Holstein, Germany; on the coast of Baltic Sea
- Neuland Colony, Mennonite settlement in Paraguay

== People ==
- Alfred Neuland (1895–1966), Estonian weightlifter
- Fritz Neuland (1889–1969), Jewish German lawyer and politician
- Wilhelm Neuland (1806–1889), composer and conductor

== Entertainment ==
- The New Land (1924 film), a 1924 German silent film starring Otto Gebühr
- Neuland, an episode of the PBS series POV by Anna Thomen

== Other uses ==
- Das Neuland, anti-religious magazine in German published in the USSR
- Operation Neuland, 1942 German submarine offensive in the Caribbean Sea
- The Internet, referencing a 2013 statement of Angela Merkel calling the internet "uncharted territory"

== See also ==
- Newland (disambiguation)
- Newlands (disambiguation)
