= Newland =

Newland may refer to:

== Places ==
=== Australia ===
- Electoral district of Newland, a state electoral district in South Australia
- Hundred of Newland, a cadastral unit on Kangaroo Island in South Australia
- Newland, South Australia, a locality in the Kangaroo Island Council
- Newland Head Conservation Park, a protected area in South Australia
- Lake Newland Conservation Park, South Australia

=== United Kingdom ===
- Newland, Cumbria
- Newland, Eastrington, East Riding of Yorkshire
- Newland, Kingston upon Hull, East Riding of Yorkshire
- Newland, Gloucestershire
- Newland, North Yorkshire
- Newland, Worcestershire
- Newland Park, Chalfont St Peter, Buckinghamshire
- Newland with Woodhouse Moor, West Yorkshire

=== United States ===
- Newland, Indiana
- Newland Creek, a stream in Missouri
- Newland, North Carolina

== Other uses ==
- Newland (surname), including a list of people with the name
- Newland Archer, the protagonist of Edith Wharton's novel The Age of Innocence

== See also ==
- Newlands (disambiguation)
- New Land (disambiguation)
- New states (disambiguation)
- New Country (disambiguation)
