= Kola-class frigate =

Class of Soviet frigates

Class overview
- Name: Kola class (Project 42)
- Builders: Yantar Yard, Kaliningrad
- Operators: Soviet Navy
- Succeeded by: Riga class
- Completed: 8
- Lost: 1
- Retired: 7

General characteristics
- Class & type: Frigate
- Displacement: 1,900 tons standard
- Length: 96 m (315 ft)
- Beam: 10.8 m (35 ft)
- Draught: 3.2 m (10 ft)
- Propulsion: 2 shaft geared steam turbines, 2 boilers 27,800 hp (20,700 kW)
- Speed: 30 kn (56 km/h; 35 mph)
- Range: 3,300 nmi (6,100 km; 3,800 mi) at 13.7 kn (25.4 km/h; 15.8 mph)
- Complement: 175
- Armament: 4× 100 mm guns (B-34) (4×1); 4× 37 mm guns (2×2); 4× 25 mm guns (2×2); MBU-900 anti-submarine rocket launchers (replaced by two RBU-2500); 3× 533 mm torpedo tubes (1×3); 48 depth charges

The Kola class was the NATO reporting name for a group of frigates built for the Soviet Navy in the 1950s. The Soviet designation was Storozhevoi Korabl (escort ship) Project 42. These ships were analogous to World War II era destroyer escorts or German Elbing-class torpedo boats. The programme consisted of only 8 ships as these vessels were considered to be too expensive for series production and the smaller and cheaper Riga-class frigate was built instead. Radars and sonars were fitted.

== Design ==
The ships were designed for patrolling Soviet waters and escorting convoys. The design process involved a specification issued in 1946 and two design bureau submitted competing designs with both diesel and steam turbine machinery. The hull was welded and longitudinally framed. The machinery suite consisted of alternating boiler rooms and turbine rooms in a unit machinery arrangement. Armament consisted of four single 100 millimetres (3.9 in) dual purpose guns and torpedo tubes.

== Ships ==
All ships were built by Yantar Yard, Kaliningrad. They were the first major ships built there after the transfer of the area to Soviet rule following World War II.

Name	Russian	Commissioned	Fate
Sokol	Сокол (Falcon)	1951	transferred to the Caspian Sea, scrapped 1970s
Berkut	Беркут (Golden Eagle)	1952	Scrapped 1970s
Kondor	Кондор (Condor)	1952	Lost in grounding accident near Murmansk 1962
Grif	Гриф (Vulture)	1952	Transferred to the Caspian Sea, scrapped 1970s
Krechet	Кречет (Gyrfalcon)	1952	Scrapped 1970s
Orlan	Орлан (Sea Eagle)	1953	Transferred to the Caspian Sea, scrapped 1970s
Lev	Лев (Lion)	1953	Scrapped 1970s
Tigr	Тигр (Tiger)	1953	Scrapped 1970s

== See also ==
- List of ships of the Soviet Navy
- List of ships of Russia by project number
