= Newbridge, North Yorkshire =

Hamlet in North Yorkshire, England

Coordinates: 54.258219°N 0.768531°W

Newbridge
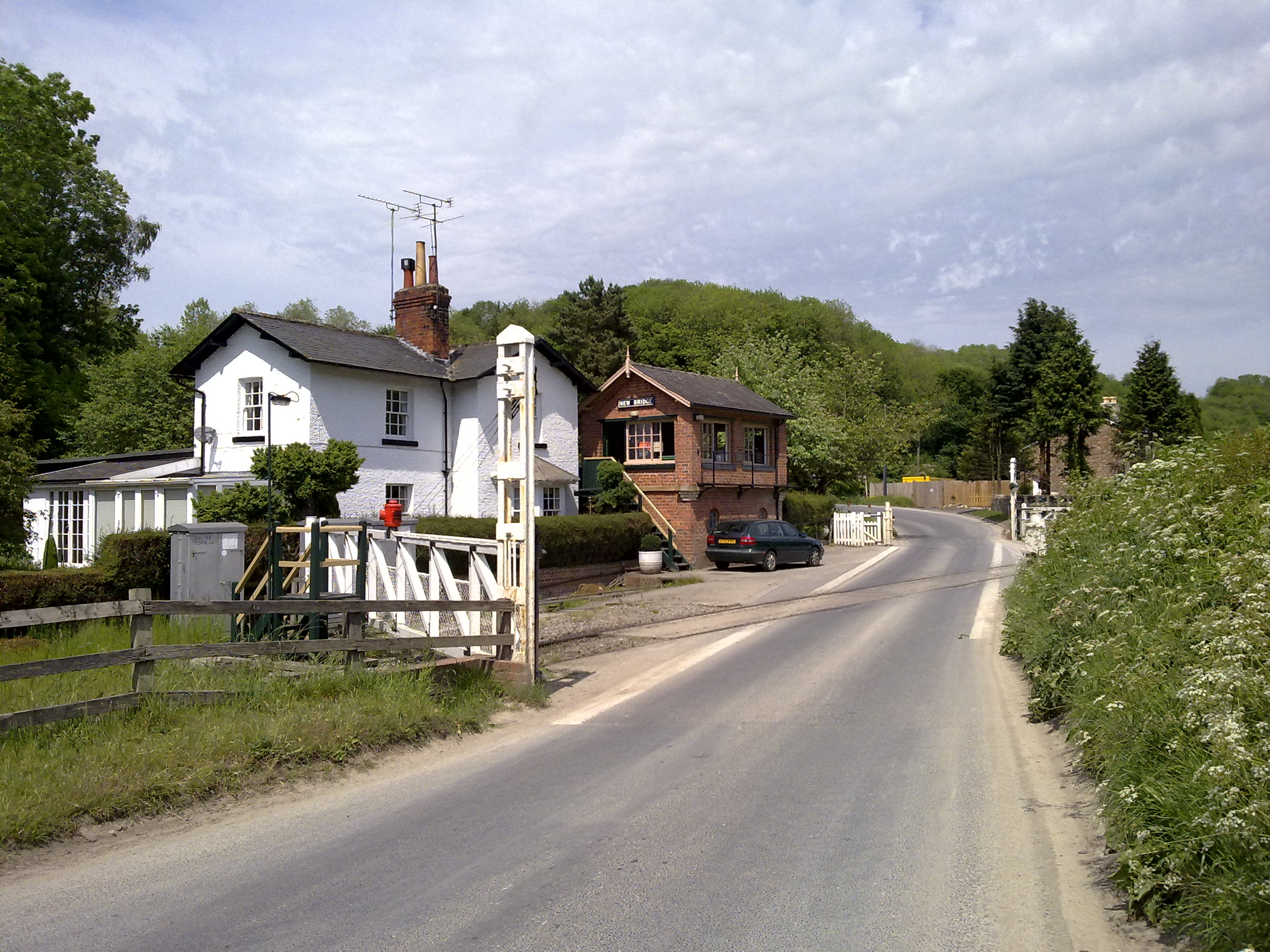
- Railway Crossing at Newbridge

- Location within North Yorkshire
- OS grid reference: SE803854
- Unitary authority: North Yorkshire
- Ceremonial county: North Yorkshire
- Region: Yorkshire and the Humber
- Country: England
- Sovereign state: United Kingdom
- Post town: PICKERING
- Postcode district: YO18
- Police: North Yorkshire
- Fire: North Yorkshire
- Ambulance: Yorkshire

Newbridge is a hamlet, near Pickering in North Yorkshire, England. There is a level crossing in the hamlet over the North York Moors Railway, but the railway calls the place New Bridge. A quarry to the north-west of the village works a limestone outcrop.
