= Sarah Lindsay Schmidt =

American children's author

- Born: Sarah Lindsay; August 24, 1877; Chicago, Illinois, US
- Died: January 31, 1965; Fort Collins, Colorado, US
- Occupation: Author
- Writing career
- Genre: Children's literature

Sarah Lindsay Schmidt (August 24, 1877 – January 31, 1965) was an American writer of children's literature. Her book New Land: A Novel for Boys and Girls was a Newbery Honor recipient in 1934.

== Biography ==
Sarah Lindsay was born in Chicago, Illinois, on August 24, 1877. Her grandfather, Thomas Milner, had been the city's first Methodist minister. Lindsay attended the University of Chicago, and began writing stories for children after graduation. She would later study at both Northwestern University and Columbia University

While teaching at a high school in Sterling, Illinois, she met a fellow teacher, G.A. Schmidt; they were married in 1910. The couple spent a few years farming, but Sarah returned to teaching in 1914, at the Whitewater Normal School (now the University of Wisconsin–Whitewater). In 1919, the Schmidts moved to Fort Collins, Colorado, where Sarah began teaching English at Colorado State University. She continued her employment at CSU until 1935, when she ceased teaching in order to focus on her writing.

New Land: A Novel for Boys and Girls was published in 1933, and was named one of eight Newbery Honor titles in 1934. Schmidt's later books included Ranching on Eagle Eye (1936), Shadow over Winding Ranch (1940), and The Hurricane Mystery (1943); Kirkus Reviews consistently praised Schmidt's novels for the accuracy of their information on farming, ranching, and mining.

Schmidt suffered a serious fall in the autumn of 1961, and never regained full health. She died in a rest home in Fort Collins on January 31, 1965.
