= Nyland =

Nyland may refer to:

== Places ==
- The Swedish-language name for Uusimaa, a region in Finland
- The Swedish-language name for Uusimaa (historical province), a historical province in Finland
- Nylands län, the Swedish-language name for Uusimaa Province, a province of Finland from 1831 to 1997
- Nyland, Somerset, a hamlet in the civil parish of Cheddar, England
- Nyland, Sweden, a locality in Kramfors Municipality, Sweden
- Nyland Station, a railway station in Oslo, Norway
- County of Nyland and Tavastehus
  - Nyland and Tavastehus County Cavalry Regiment
- Nylands Nation
- Östra Nyland, the Swedish-language name for Eastern Uusimaa, a former region in Finland
- Östra Nyland, a Swedish-language newspaper published in Finland

== People ==
- Bente Nyland (born 1958) Norwegian geologist
- Bjørn Nyland (born 1962), Norwegian speedskater
- Bjørn Nyland (born 1979 in Thailand), Norwegian YouTuber a.k.a. TeslaBjørn
- Diane Nyland (1944–2014) Canadian actress
- Johan M. Nyland (1931–2007) Norwegian politician
- Maren Nyland Aardahl (born 1994) Norwegian handball player
- Margaret Nyland (born 1942) Australian judge
- William L. Nyland (born 1946) U.S. soldier
- Ørjan Nyland (born 1990) Norwegian professional footballer

== Other uses ==
- Nyland Brigade, Finnish Navy marines brigade
- Nyland Yacht Club, Helsinki, Finland
- County of Nyland and Tavastehus
  - Nyland and Tavastehus County Cavalry Regiment
- Nylands Nation
- Östra Nyland, the Swedish-language name for Eastern Uusimaa, a former region in Finland
- Östra Nyland, a Swedish-language newspaper published in Finland

== See also ==
- Niland -- common, related surname
- Uusimaa (disambiguation), Finnish for Nyland
