= Newbridge Quarry =

Quarry in North Yorkshire, England

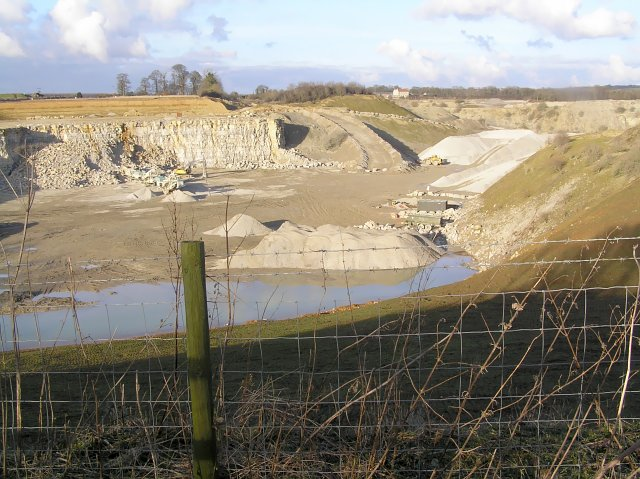
- Interactive map of Newbridge Quarry
- Location: Pickering, North Yorkshire, England; 54.264°N 0.774°W
- Products: Limestone
- Type: Quarry
- Opened: 1946
- Closed: 2026 (projected)
- Company: Breedon

Newbridge Quarry is a limestone quarry located just to the north of Pickering, North Yorkshire, England. The quarry works the Upper Calcerous Grit Formation and quarrying operations have been carried out at the site since at least the 1840s when the first quarry was rail-connected to the Whitby and Pickering Railway. The current quarry has been in operation since the 1946, and has a projected closure date of December 2026.

== History ==
Covering an area of 200 acres (80 hectares), Newbridge Quarry is 1.9 miles (3 km) north of Pickering and lies between 279 feet (85 m) and 344 feet (105 m) above sea level. The quarry works a limestone in the Upper Calcerous Grit Formation (the Upper Oxfordian Stage), which encircles the site to the south.

To the immediate south-west of the site is an 17-acre (6.9 ha) SSSI (Newbridge Quarry), which has been recorded on account of its geological state which allows for the "...dating [of] the final phase of Corallian sedimentation in Yorkshire." Evidence of Iron Age activity has been discovered in the quarry in the form of a large square barrow, which it is thought to have been part of a settlement.

Historically, limestone from the Newbridge area has been worked since at least 1840 when railway sidings were laid to transport the stone out using the Whitby and Pickering Railway, and then when the line was opened out southwards towards Malton and York. The sidings for the quarry were also used to forward sand quarried from Saintoft (further north), which arrived at the quarry sidings via a narrow-gauge railway. During the 19th century, the site had a section of lime-kilns, with a report detailing that one worker fell to his death from the top of the kiln, 25 feet (7.6 m) below. The current quarrying operations were started in 1946, and have been owned by a number of companies such as RMC, Cemex and latterly, Breedon.

In 1992, the owners had to stop blasting the limestone as they were threatened with legal action by local residents who accused the company of causing subsidence and other damage to their properties. In 2003, the then owners (RMC), announced they would relinquish the rights to work the quarry at Yatts Brow (to the north) in favour of an expanded Newbridge Quarry; Yatts Brow extends into the North York Moors National Park and forms part of the Newtondale SSSI. Quarrying operations nearly ceased at the site in 2013, but the building works for Woodsmith Mine required aggregates and a deal was struck to keep the quarry in operation. The site has permission to keep quarrying until December 2026, when the 80 hectares (200 acres) site must be returned to agricultural land.

Various ammonite fossils have been found and documented from the quarry workings.
