= Newlands, Johannesburg =

Newlands
- Location within Gauteng Location within South Africa
- Coordinates: 26.172°S 27.963°E
- Country: South Africa
- Province: Gauteng
- Municipality: City of Johannesburg
- Main Place: Johannesburg
- Established: 1897

Area
  - Total: 1.98 km^{2} (0.76 sq mi)

Population (2011)
  - Total: 11,295
  - Density: 5,700/km^{2} (14,800/sq mi)

Racial makeup (2011)
  - Black African: 39.4%
  - Coloured: 32.1%
  - Indian/Asian: 1.6%
  - White: 24.7%
  - Other: 2.1%

First languages (2011)
  - Afrikaans: 36.7%
  - English: 27.8%
  - Tswana: 10.1%
  - Zulu: 7.5%
  - Other: 17.9%
- Time zone: UTC+2 (SAST)
- Postal code (street): 2092
- PO box: n/a
- Area code: 011

Newlands is a suburb of Johannesburg, South Africa. It is located in the province of Gauteng.

== History ==
Prior to the discovery of gold on the Witwatersrand in 1886, the suburb lay on land on one of the original farms called Waterval. The suburb was established in 1897 by J.J.P. Ackermann.

== See also ==
- Newlands, a suburb of Cape Town
- Newlands, a suburb of Pretoria
