= Newland (surname) =

Newland is a surname. Notable people with the name include:

- Abraham Newland (1730–1807), English banker
- Arthur Ernest Newland (1882–1964), British World War I observer ace
- Courttia Newland (born 1973), English novelist
- Dan Newland (born 1949), American journalist, translator, blogger, and writer
- Henry Garrett Newland (1805–1860), English cleric and author
- Henry Simpson Newland (1873–1969), Australian surgeon
- James Newland (1881–1949), Australian WWI Victoria Cross recipient
- James E. Newland (1830–1907), American politician
- John Newland (1917–2000), US director and actor
- John Newlands (Australian politician) (1864–1932), was known as John Newland until May 1926
- Ken Newland (1949–2025), Australian rules footballer
- Martin Newland (born 1961), British journalist
- Marv Newland, North American animation filmmaker
- Richard Newland (cricketer) (1713–1778), English cricketer
- Richard Francis Newland ( –1873), banker, politician and public servant in South Australia
- Ridgway William Newland (1788–1864), Congregationalist minister in South Australia, head of large family
- Simpson Newland (1853–1925), Australian pastoralist, author and politician
- Victor Marra Newland (1876–1953), Australian army officer and politician
- William C. Newland (1860–1938), American lawyer and politician
