= Newlands, Pretoria =

Newlands
- Location within Gauteng Location within South Africa
- Coordinates: 25°47′40″S 28°16′10″E
- Country: South Africa
- Province: Gauteng
- Municipality: City of Tshwane
- Main Place: Pretoria

Area
  - Total: 1.72 km^{2} (0.66 sq mi)

Population (2011)
  - Total: 3,675
  - Density: 2,140/km^{2} (5,530/sq mi)

Racial makeup (2011)
  - Black African: 24.1%
  - Coloured: 2.5%
  - Indian/Asian: 4.1%
  - White: 66.7%
  - Other: 2.5%

First languages (2011)
  - Afrikaans: 50.1%
  - English: 29.4%
  - Tswana: 2.9%
  - Zulu: 2.8%
  - Other: 14.8%
- Time zone: UTC+2 (SAST)
- Postal code (street): 0181
- PO box: 7725
- Area code: 012

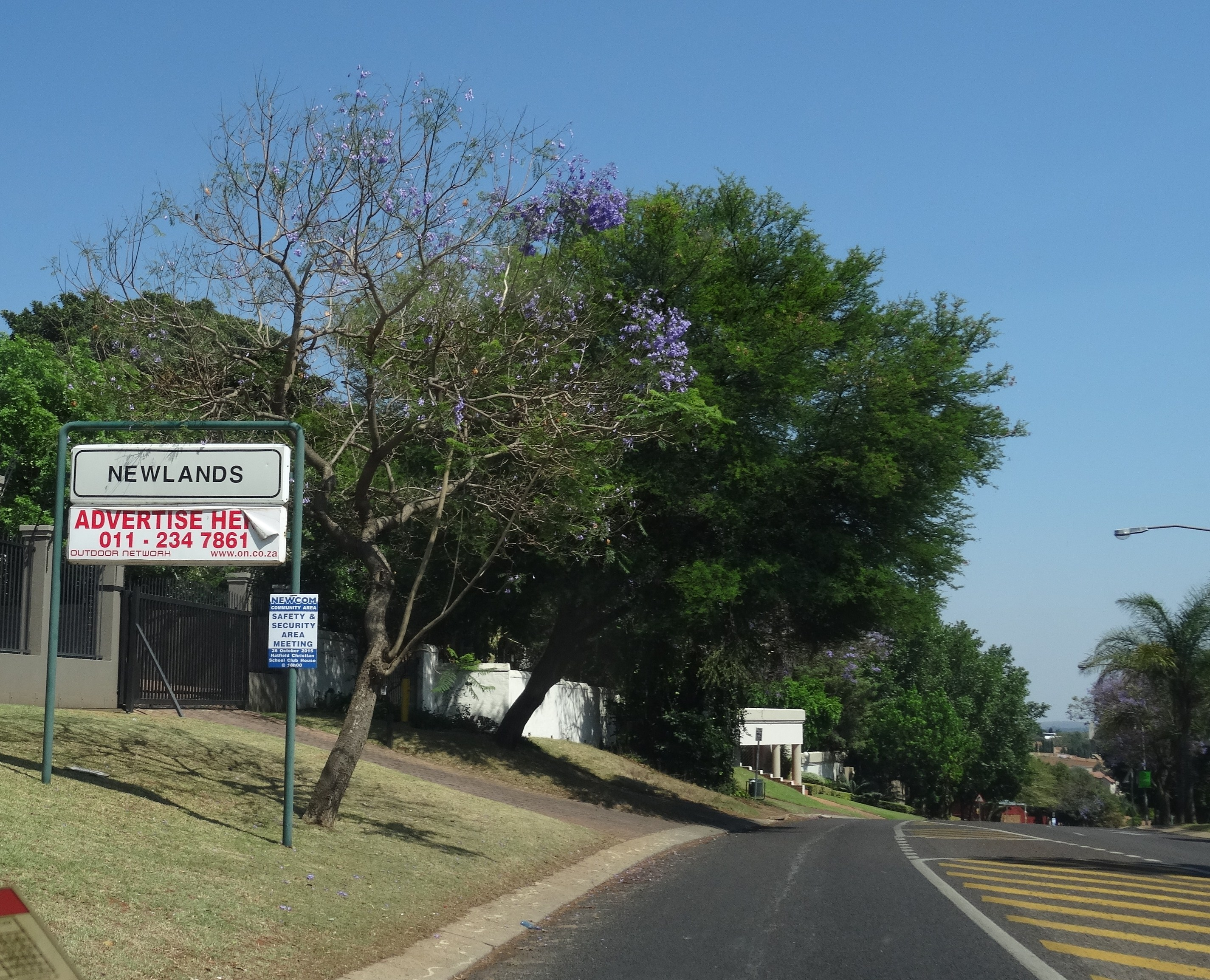
Entrance to Newlands

Newlands is a residential suburb of Pretoria in Gauteng, South Africa.

== See also ==
- Newlands, a suburb of Cape Town
- Newlands, a suburb of Johannesburg
