= Newbury, Kent =

Hamlet in Kent, England

Coordinates: 51.3058°N 0.7629°E

Newbury
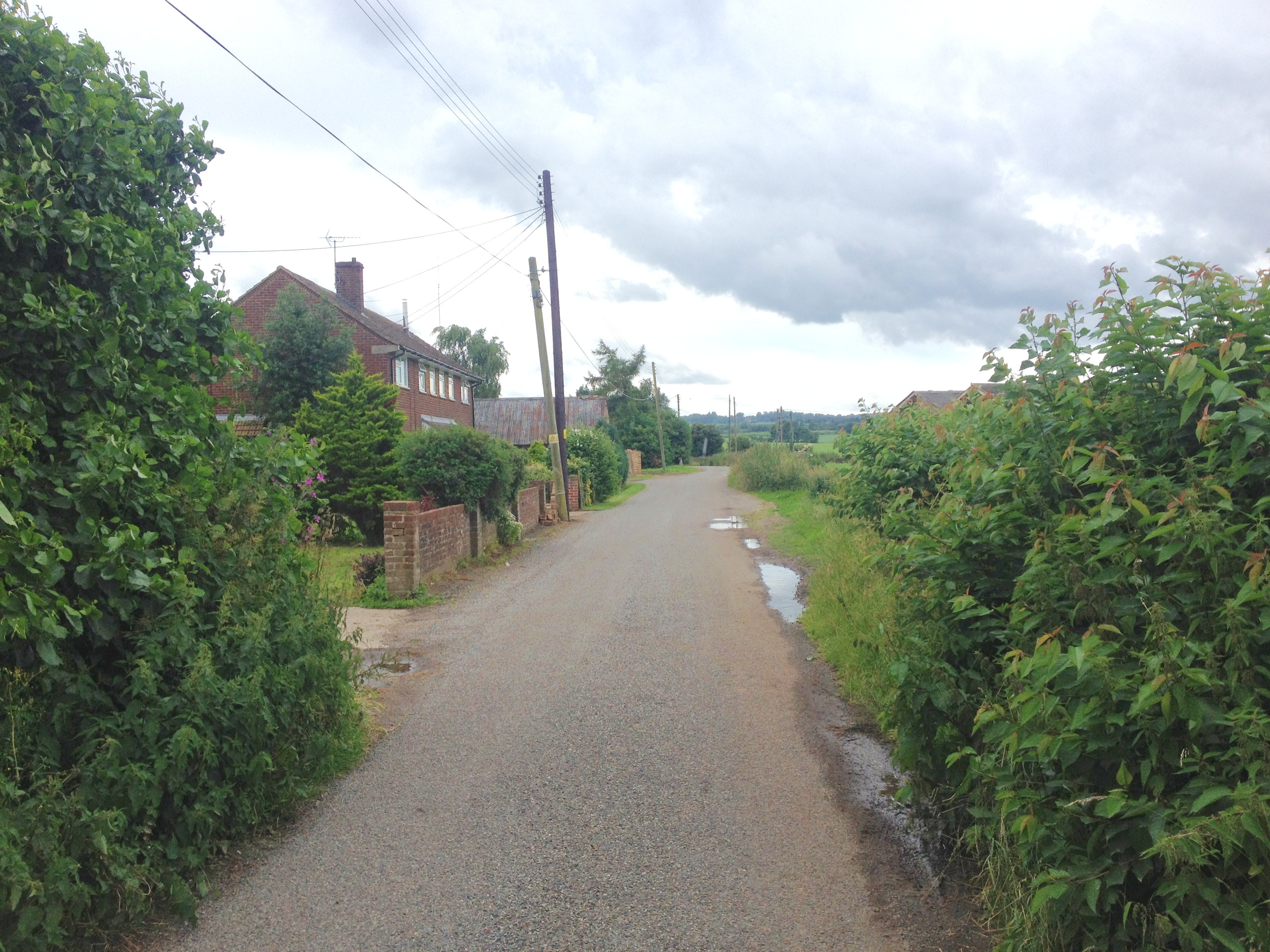
- Dully Road

- Location within Kent
- Civil parish: Tonge
- District: Swale
- Shire county: Kent
- Region: South East
- Country: England
- Sovereign state: United Kingdom

Newbury is a hamlet near the village of Erriottwood, in the Swale district, in the county of Kent, England. It is south of the town of Sittingbourne, and in the far south of Tonge civil parish, on the boundary with Rodmersham parish. The OS grid reference is TQ9260.
