= Niland =

Niland is a surname. Notable people with the surname include:

- Conor Niland (born 1981), tennis player
- D'Arcy Niland (1917–1967), author
- Deborah Niland (born 1950), illustrator
- Elly Niland (born 1954), poet
- John Niland (born 1940), academic
- John Niland (American football) (born 1944), footballer
- Josh Niland, chef
- Kilmeny Niland (1950–2009), illustrator
- Mary Kevin Niland, clerk
- Niland brothers
- Nora Niland (1913–1988), librarian
- Tom Niland (1870–1950), baseball player
- Evan Niland (born 1998), hurler

== See also ==
- Model Arts and Niland Gallery
- Niland, California
