= Newlands (surname) =

Newlands is a surname. Notable people with the surname include:

- Francis G. Newlands, American senator
- George Newlands, Scottish theologian
- Henry William Newlands, Canadian politician
- John Newlands (Australian politician), Australian politician
- John Alexander Reina Newlands, English chemist
- James Newlands, British civil engineer
- Mark Newlands, Australian producer and turntablist
