= New Land (magazine) =

Australian Chinese-English bilingual magazine

- Editor: Michelle Lam
- Founded: 2004
- Country: Australia
- Based in: Sydney
- Website: New Land

New Land Magazine (新天地雜誌) is an Australian Chinese-English bilingual magazine currently headquartered in Sydney. The magazine was established in 2004. Its aim is to bridge the gap between Chinese and Australian cultures, and to provide a gateway for the Asian community into the Australian lifestyle, culture and customs. The content emphasizes real-life stories, and covers fashion, food and travel destinations.
