= Nieuwland, Zeeland =

Coordinates: 51.484323°N 3.670206°E

Nieuwland is a former municipality in the Dutch province of Zeeland. It existed until 1816, when it was merged with Sint Joosland to form the new municipality of Nieuw- en Sint Joosland.

Nieuwland is also the former name of the current village of Nieuw- en Sint Joosland.
