= Newfield, Highland =

Coordinates: 57.76817°N 4.0419°W

Newfield
- Location within the Ross and Cromarty area
- OS grid reference: NH786337
- Council area: Highland
- Country: Scotland
- Sovereign state: United Kingdom
- Post town: Tain
- Postcode district: IV19
- Police: Scotland
- Fire: Scottish
- Ambulance: Scottish

Newfield is a small hamlet in eastern Ross-shire, in the Highland area of Scotland. Newfield is located 3 miles south of Tain.
