= New Land: A Novel for Boys and Girls =

1933 novel by Sarah Lindsay Schmidt

- First edition
- Author: Sarah Lindsay Schmidt
- Illustrator: Frank Dobias
- Language: English
- Genre: Young adult, Historical fiction
- Publisher: Robert M. McBride & Co.
- Publication date: 1933
- Publication place: United States
- Media type: Print

New Land: A Novel for Boys and Girls is a children's novel by Sarah Lindsay Schmidt. During the Great Depression in the United States in the 1930s, the Morgan family, 17-year-old Sayre, twin brother Charley, little sister Hattie, and their father move from Chicago to work on a farm in rural Wyoming. A local store owner, Franklin Hoskins, soon takes a dislike to the family and begins sabotaging them. It was a Newbery Honor recipient in 1934.
