= Nieuwland, Amersfoort =

Coordinates: 52.199°N 5.377°E

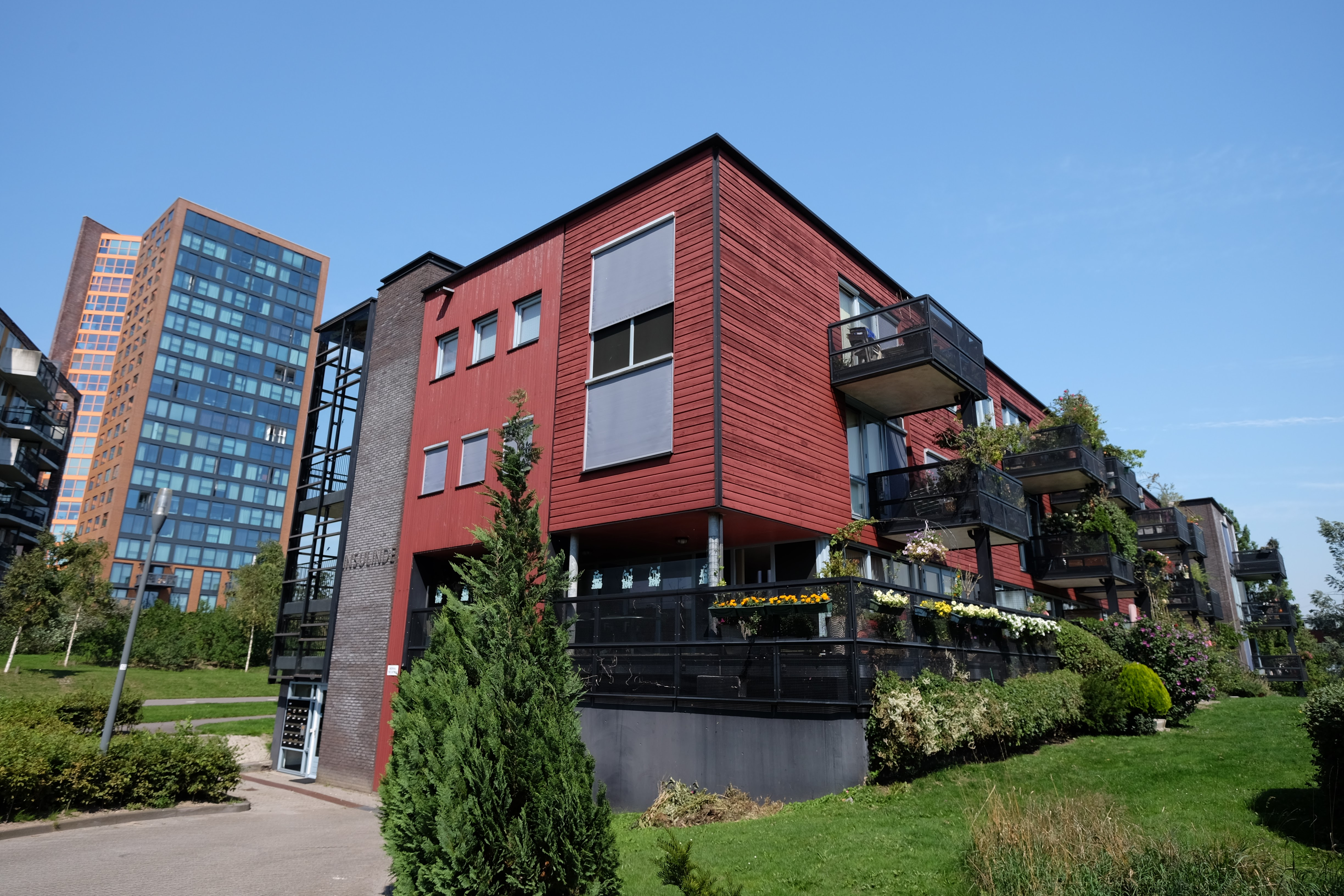
Inside Nieuwland

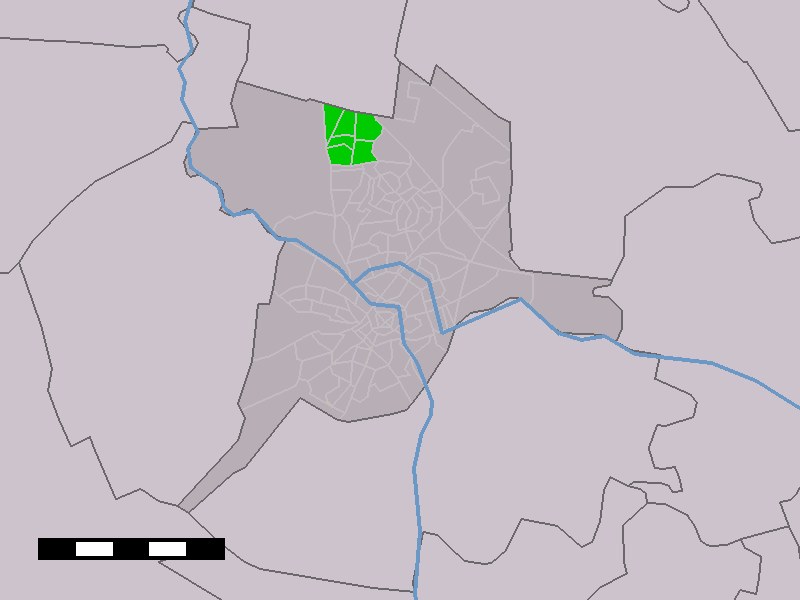

Nieuwland (lit. 'New Land'), is a district in the Dutch city Amersfoort. The project started in 1995 and finished in 2001 when an area with 4500 houses was completed.
