= Riga-class frigate =

Class of Soviet Frigates

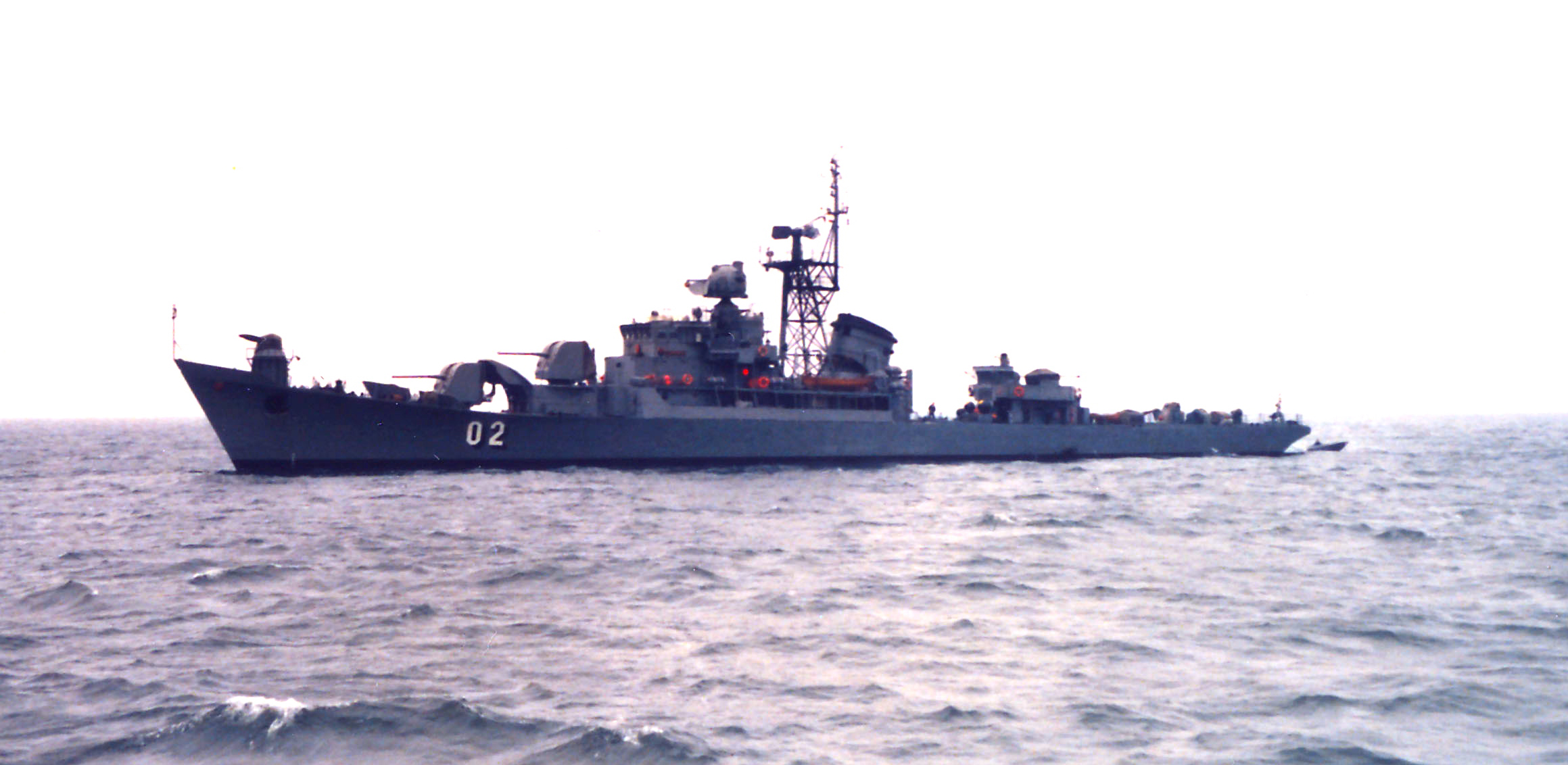
- Finnish Riga class Hämeenmaa

Class overview
- Name: Riga class
- Operators: Soviet Navy; Bulgarian Navy; Volksmarine; Finnish Navy; Indonesian Navy; People's Liberation Army Navy
- Preceded by: Kola class
- Succeeded by: Petya class; Krivak class
- Completed: 69

General characteristics
- Class & type: Frigate
- Displacement: 1,160 tons (standard); 1,416 tons (full load)
- Length: 91 m (299 ft)
- Beam: 10.2 m (33 ft)
- Draught: 3.16 m (10.4 ft)
- Propulsion: 2 × shaft steam turbines, 2 × boilers; 21,000 hp (16,000 kW)
- Speed: 28 knots (52 km/h; 32 mph)
- Range: 1,950 nmi (3,610 km; 2,240 mi) at 14 kn (26 km/h; 16 mph)
- Complement: 175
- Armament: 3 × 100 mm guns/56 (B-34) (3×1); 4 × 37 mm guns (2×2); 4 × 25 mm guns (2×2) - Some ships; MBU-600 anti-submarine rocket launchers (replaced by two RBU-2500); 2 or 3 × 533 mm torpedo tubes (1×2 or 1×3)

The Riga class was the NATO reporting name for class of frigates built for the Soviet Navy in the 1950s. The Soviet designation for these ships was Storozhevoi Korabl (escort ship) Project 50 Gornostay (Ermine stoat). The Riga class was analogous to World War II era destroyer escorts.

== Design ==
These ships were a smaller and simpler version of the Kola class. According to Conway's, this simpler group of ships were ordered by Joseph Stalin who was concerned about the cost of large ships. The class introduced high pressure steam turbines and new radars into Soviet service. The bridge, gun turrets, and magazines were covered in 8 mm (0.31 in)-thick armour. The main armament comprised three single dual-purpose 100 mm (3.9 in) guns with remote power control and a single Yakor type fire control director. The machinery comprised two TV-9 steam turbines with two boilers and had initial problems with reliability.

The Project 50 Riga class was a rather simplistic and straight forward design. With their basic capabilities, moderate size and ease of operation, they made perfect export vessels for smaller navies where such ships could easily fill the multi-purpose role, taking the place of large minesweepers and actual destroyers.

There was a modernisation programme designated Project 50 A in the late 1950s early 1960s. This included fitting anti-submarine rocket launchers (RBU-2500) new radar and adding permanent ballast for improved stability.

== Ships ==
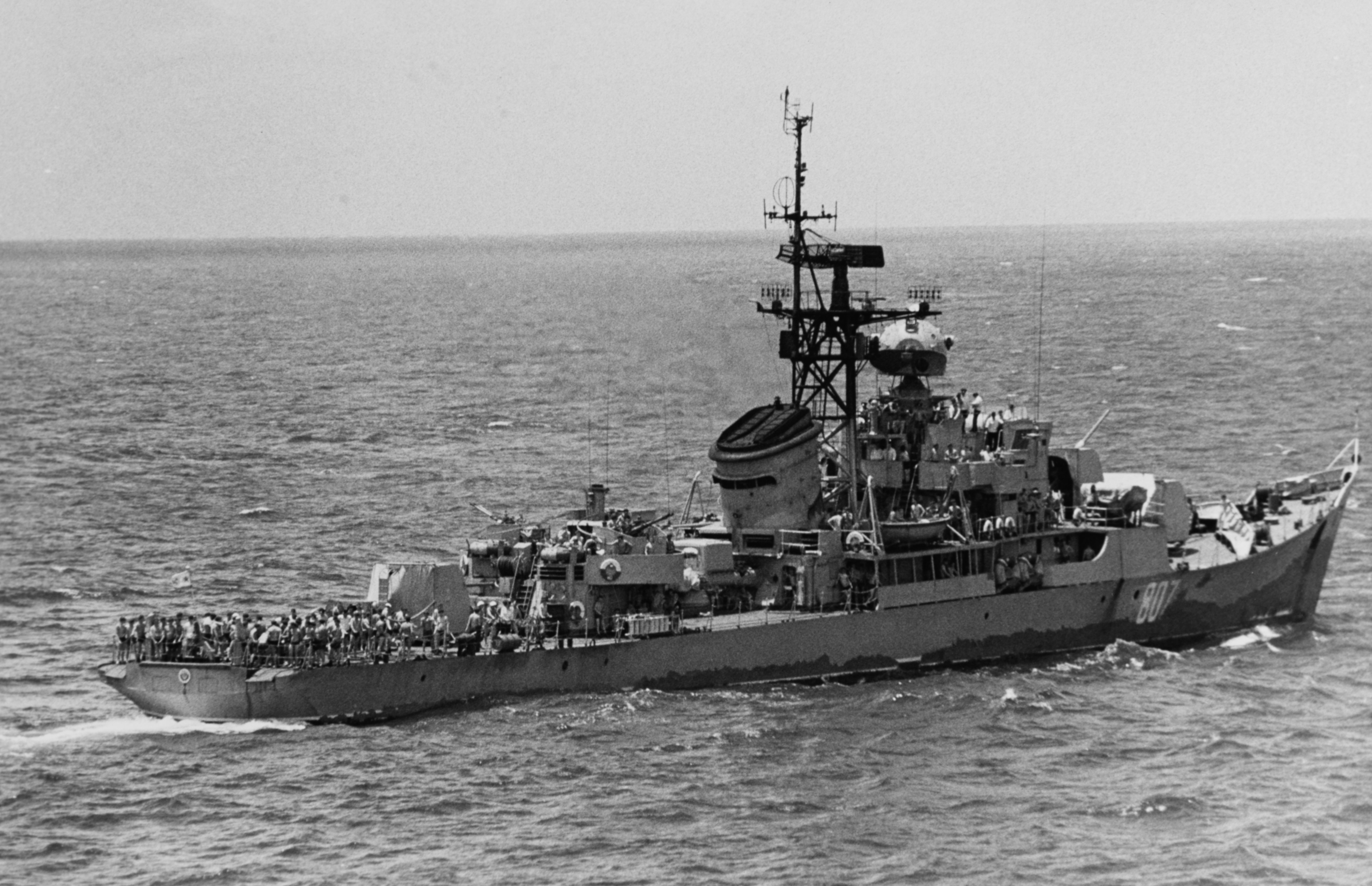
A Soviet Riga class during Exercise OKEAN in April 1970

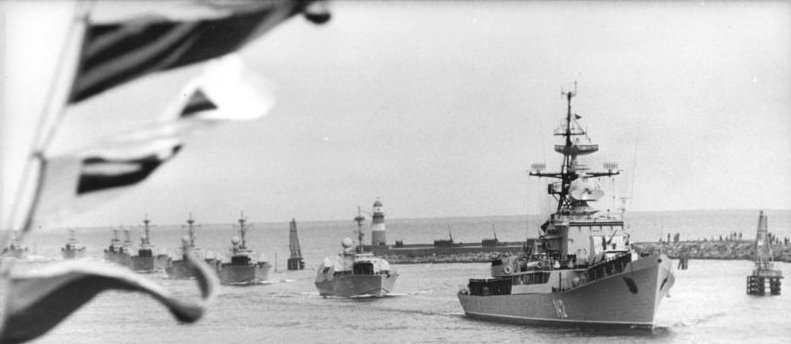
Karl Marx of the Volksmarine

A total of 68 ships were built by Nikolayev yards (20 ships), Komsomolsk-on-Amur (7 ships) and Kaliningrad (the lead yard 41 ships). Most ships were decommissioned by 1980, however some were sold to China. The programme was cut short by Nikita Khrushchev in 1956 as the ships were becoming obsolete and the last ship was completed in 1959.

Riga-class frigates of the Soviet Union
Name	Builder	Laid down	Launched	Commissioned	Decommissioned	Fate
Leopard	Kaliningrad	21 December 1952	30 April 1953	30 April 1954	3 September 1981	
Bars	Kaliningrad	25 April 1952	25 July 1953	30 June 1954	19 April 1990	
Rosomakha	Kaliningrad	19 June 1952	16 August 1953	30 April 1954	4 May 1989	
Sobol	Kaliningrad	27 September 1952	5 November 1953	13 October 1954	31 October 1971	Transferred to East Germany in 1956 as Karl Marx
Barsuk	Kaliningrad	2 December 1952	27 February 1954	15 September 1954	28 May 1980	Sank as target ship in 1981
Kuguar	Kaliningrad	27 March 1953	31 December 1953	31 August 1954	19 April 1990	
Yenot	Kaliningrad	17 October 1953	9 April 1954	30 October 1954	10 October 1969	Transferred to East Germany in 1959 as Friedrich Engels
Filin	Kaliningrad	27 August 1953	6 June 1954	9 December 1954	1979	Transferred to Finland in 1964 as Uusimaa
Luń	Kaliningrad	20 October 1953	5 August 1954	27 December 1954	4 May 1989	
Kobchik	Kaliningrad	26 December 1953	2 November 1954	31 May 1955	1993	Transferred to Bulgaria in 1985 as Bodri
Tur	Kaliningrad	24 March 1954	16 December 1954	31 May 1955	1 October 1969	Transferred to East Germany in 1957 as Karl Liebknecht
Loś	Kaliningrad	26 May 1954	29 March 1955	31 July 1955	20 July 1987	
Oleń	Kaliningrad	2 August 1954	29 April 1954	27 August 1955	29 August 1977	Transferred to East Germany in 1956 as Ernst Thälmann
SKR-76	Kaliningrad	29 April 1957	16 December 1957	15 June 1958	4 May 1989	
SKR-69	Kaliningrad	29 July 1956	28 December 1956	30 May 1957	1985	Transferred to Finland in 1964 as Hämeenmaa
SKR-70	Kaliningrad	13 August 1956	19 February 1957	20 June 1957	24 June 1991	
SKR-71	Kaliningrad	21 September 1956	3 April 1957	13 July 1957	24 June 1991	
SKR-72	Kaliningrad	26 January 1957	16 May 1957	26 September 1957	1 September 1994	Abandoned at the mouth of the Iokanga River, Murmansk Oblast. Wreck is visible as of 2022.
SKR-73	Kaliningrad	24 December 1956	21 June 1957	30 September 1957	11 February 1991	
SKR-74	Kaliningrad	4 February 1957	27 July 1957	26 November 1957	25 June 1988	
SKR-54	Kaliningrad	20 December 1954	31 August 1955	31 December 1955	20 June 1987	
SKR-75	Kaliningrad	14 March 1957	3 September 1957	30 December 1957	25 June 1988	
SKR-77	Kaliningrad	17 June 1957	20 January 1958	29 June 1958	4 May 1989	
SKR-80	Kaliningrad	17 September 1957	13 March 1958	31 July 1958	20 June 1987	
SKR-81	Kaliningrad	17 October 1957	15 April 1958	31 August 1958	26 June 1988	
SKR-10	Kaliningrad	27 November 1957	30 May 1958	21 October 1958	20 June 1987	
SKR-4	Kaliningrad	22 January 1958	30 July 1958	13 December 1958	4 May 1989	
SKR-5	Kaliningrad	24 December 1957	1 September 1958	31 December 1958	4 May 1989	
SKR-8	Kaliningrad	24 April 1958	18 October 1958	31 December 1958	19 April 1990	
SKR-14	Kaliningrad	29 May 1958	9 January 1959	September 1959	20 June 1987	
SKR-15	Kaliningrad	10 July 1958	27 February 1959	1 October 1959	19 April 1990	
SKR-59	Kaliningrad	21 June 1955	2 February 1956	25 May 1956	4 May 1989	
SKR-60	Kaliningrad	8 December 1955	13 April 1956	29 June 1956	25 June 1988	
SKR-61	Kaliningrad	17 October 1955	24 May 1956	23 August 1956	4 May 1989	
SKR-62	Kaliningrad	21 December 1955	27 June 1956	25 September 1956	4 May 1989	
SKR-64	Kaliningrad	8 February 1956	1 August 1956	31 October 1956	1 August 1987	
SKR-55	Kaliningrad	18 February 1955	30 September 1955	31 December 1955	20 June 1987	
SKR-65	Kaliningrad	28 March 1956	4 September 1956	27 December 1956	4 May 1989	
SKR-68	Kaliningrad	17 May 1956	27 October 1956	23 March 1957	4 May 1989	
SKR-56	Kaliningrad	16 April 1955	6 January 1956	21 May 1956	4 May 1989	
SKR-50	Kaliningrad	12 October 1954	16 August 1955	3 January 1956	20 June 1987	
Gornostay	Nikolayev	20 December 1951	30 June 1952	30 June 1954	24 June 1991	
Pantera	Nikolayev	21 February 1952	20 August 1952	21 May 1954	25 June 1988	
Ryś	Nikolayev	22 April 1952	31 December 1952	21 May 1954	19 April 1990	
Yaguar	Nikolayev	23 July 1952	14 February 1953	24 April 1954	13 August 1987	
Sarych	Nikolayev	24 September 1952	31 March 1953	31 August 1954	1986	Transferred to Indonesia in 1963 as RI Jos Sudarso (351)
Puma	Nikolayev	25 November 1952	29 April 1953	31 August 1954	1973	Transferred to Indonesia in 1963 as RI Slamet Rijadi (352)
Volk	Nikolayev	26 February 1953	23 July 1953	31 October 1954	4 October 1988	
Kunitsa	Nikolayev	27 May 1953	30 November 1953	23 December 1954	4 May 1989	
Korsak	Nikolayev	1 August 1953	29 April 1954	30 December 1954	1974	Transferred to Indonesia in 1963 as RI Ngurah Rai (353)
Norka	Nikolayev	12 January 1954	29 April 1954	30 April 1955	4 May 1989	
Voron	Nikolayev	12 March 1954	11 November 1954	18 June 1955	4 May 1989	
Grizon	Nikolayev	15 April 1954	29 November 1954	30 June 1955	1971	Transferred to Indonesia in 1963 as RI Monginsidi (354)
SKR-51	Nikolayev	25 June 1954	26 February 1955	28 September 1955	24 June 1991	
SKR-52	Nikolayev	1 September 1954	15 April 1955	26 November 1955	4 May 1989	
SKR-53	Nikolayev	20 November 1954	15 April 1955	31 December 1955	1989	Transferred to Bulgaria in 1958 as Smeli
SKR-57	Nikolayev	23 December 1954	21 July 1955	28 February 1956	4 May 1989	
SKR-58	Nikolayev	15 March 1955	21 July 1955	7 May 1956	19 April 1990	
SKR-63	Nikolayev	5 May 1955	28 October 1955	30 May 1956		
SKR-66	Nikolayev	10 February 1956	30 May 1956	29 September 1956	5 May 1989	
SKR-67	Nikolayev	1 March 1956	10 July 1956	22 December 1956	1990	Transferred to Bulgaria in 1957 as Druzki
Zubr	Komsomolsk-on-Amur	29 August 1952	9 July 1953	31 May 1954	1971	Transferred to Indonesia in 1965 as RI Hang Tuah (358)
Bizon	Komsomolsk-on-Amur	4 October 1952	9 July 1953	30 June 1954	1985	Transferred to Indonesia in 1965 as RI Kakiali (359)
Aist	Komsomolsk-on-Amur	25 December 1952	25 August 1953	27 August 1954	1986	Transferred to Indonesia in 1965 as RI Lambung Mangkurat (357)
Giena	Komsomolsk-on-Amur	5 March 1953	18 May 1954	25 October 1954	19 June 1981	
Pelikan	Komsomolsk-on-Amur	1 August 1953	18 April 1954	30 November 1954	1981	Transferred to Indonesia in 1964 as RI Nuku (360)
Pingvin	Komsomolsk-on-Amur	10 September 1953	13 August 1954	31 December 1954	25 June 1988	
Gepard	Komsomolsk-on-Amur	21 December 1953	13 August 1954	31 December 1954	31 May 1984	

=== Export operators ===
Bulgaria
Bulgarian Navy : 3 ships (Druzki, Smeli and Bodri) operated 1957–1990, decommissioned 1990.

China
4 ships were built in kits for the People's Liberation Army Navy to be licence assembled in China as Chengdu class (Type 6601/01) frigate. After that, PRC built 5 ships with a different gun arrangements as Jiangnan class (Type 065) frigate, reverse-engineered copies from type 6601.

Finland
Finnish Navy : 2 ships (Uusimaa and Hämeenmaa) acquired 1964, decommissioned 1979 and 1985 (source Conway's). The class was called the Hämeenmaa class or Uusimaa class in Finland since the ships had some unique modifications (i.e. British submarine hunting equipment).

East Germany
East German Navy : 4 ships (Ernst Thälmann, Karl Marx, Karl Liebknecht, Friedrich Engels).

Indonesia
Indonesian Navy: 8 ships (Jos Sudarso, Slamet Rijadi, Ngurah Rai, Monginsidi, Lambung Mangkurat, Hang Tuah, Kakiali, Nuku) transferred 1962–1964, decommissioned 1971–1986 (Source Conway's).

== See also ==
- List of ships of the Soviet Navy
- List of ships of Russia by project number

Equivalent frigates of the same era

- Azopardo class
- Blackwood class
- Van Amstel class
- Centauro class
