= Nijland (crater) =

Crater on the Moon

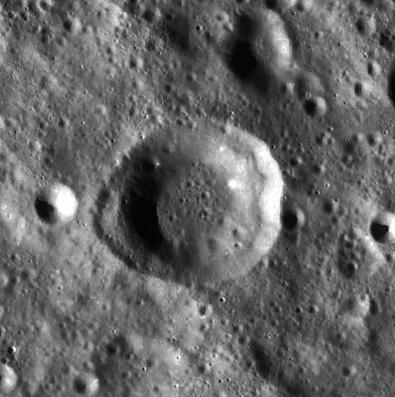
- LRO WAC image
- Coordinates: 33.0°N 134.1°E
- Diameter: 35 km
- Depth: Unknown
- Colongitude: 226° at sunrise
- Eponym: Albertus A. Nijland

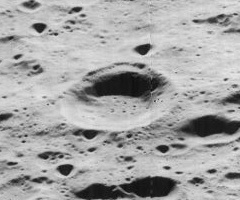
Oblique Lunar Orbiter 5 image

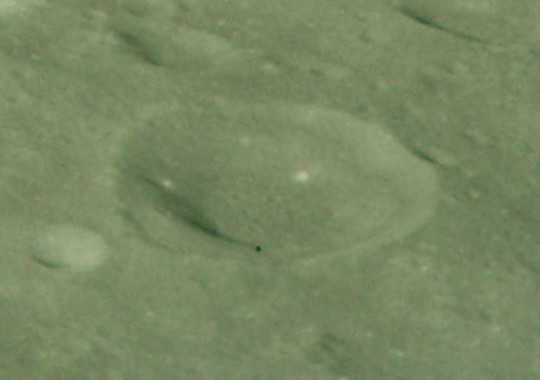
View from Apollo 13

Nijland is a relatively small impact crater on the far side of the Moon. This is a relatively isolated crater that is surrounded by an impacted surface with smaller craters. The nearest significant crater is Kurchatov to the northeast. More than 100 km to the north of Nijland is a crater chain that runs from the south of Kurchatov towards the west-northwest. This chain is designated Catena Kurchatov.

This is a roughly circular, bowl-shaped crater with a slight outward bulge along the western face. Although worn, the rim edge remains well-defined and is not overlain by any significant impacts. The interior floor is about half the crater diameter, and there are only a few tiny craterlets marking the surface.

== Satellite craters ==
By convention, these features are identified on lunar maps by placing the letter on the side of the crater midpoint that is closest to Nijland.

Nijland	Latitude	Longitude	Diameter
A	36.2° N	134.4° E	26 km
V	34.5° N	131.6° E	35 km
