= Newby, Hambleton =

Village and civil parish in North Yorkshire, England

Coordinates: 54.50333°N 1.21799°W

Newby
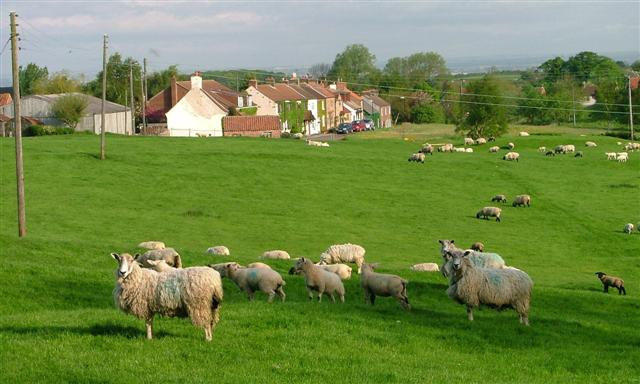
- Newby

- Location within North Yorkshire
- Population: 214 (2011 census)
- OS grid reference: NZ507122
- Civil parish: Newby
- Unitary authority: North Yorkshire
- Ceremonial county: North Yorkshire
- Region: Yorkshire and the Humber
- Country: England
- Sovereign state: United Kingdom
- Post town: MIDDLESBROUGH
- Postcode district: TS8
- Police: North Yorkshire
- Fire: North Yorkshire
- Ambulance: Yorkshire

Newby is a village and civil parish in the county of North Yorkshire, England. Close to the border with the borough of Middlesbrough and 7 miles (11 km) from the centre of Middlesbrough. Newby is located 6.3 miles (10.1 km) west from the North York Moors at its closest point, which became a National Park in 1952. According to the United Kingdom Census 2011 Newby had a total population of 214.

== History ==
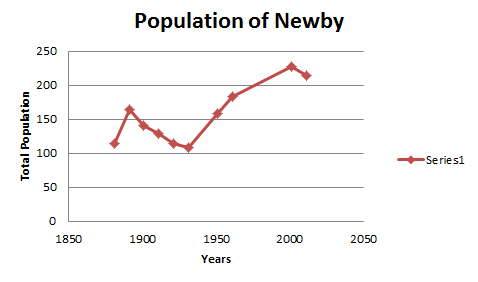
Timescale showing population of Newby 1881–2011

In 1870 John Marius Wilson's Imperial Gazetteer of England and Wales described Newby as:

"Newby, a township in Stokesley parish, N. R. Yorkshire; 2½ miles N of Stokesley. Acres, 1, 211. Real property, £1, 464. Pop., 129. Houses, 29. There is a Wesleyan chapel; and there was formerly a slightly-endowed school."

Census data since 1881 can help to show how Newby has changed throughout the years. The main occupation for residents in 1881 was agriculture with 24 males and 1 female employed in that sector. Another main employment sector in 1881 was domestic services with 6 females working in that sector at the time. In 1881 the population of Newby was 115 and the total number of houses was 29. This has increased since 1881 with the total number of houses significantly increasing between 1931 and 1951 from 22 to 45.

The population of Newby has fluctuated between 109 and 214 people between 1881 and 2011. The population of Newby in the 20th Century hit a peak of 183 in 1961. The population of Newby in 2011 is 214 and covers a wide range of age groups.

From 1974 to 2023 it was part of the Hambleton District, it is now administered by the unitary North Yorkshire Council.

== Listed buildings ==
The Wesleyan Methodist Church in Newby was first built in 1826 and is a grade II Listed building, after it was listed on 4 August 1983. This is not the only listed building in Newby, there are seven others. These include Antelope Lodge, Long Farm House, The Haven and Newby Grange. All of the Listed buildings within Newby are listed at a grade II level and were added to the British listed buildings catalogue in 1983.

== Transport ==
The village is on the B1365 and is 2 miles (3.2 km) from the A172. It is also served by the 83 route to Stokesley. Nunthorpe railway station is the located 3 miles (4.8 km) east of the village, with frequent trains running along the Esk Valley Line.
