= Finnish frigate Uusimaa =

History

Soviet Union
- Name: Filin
- Namesake: Russian word for owl (Филин)
- Builder: Yantar, Kaliningrad
- Yard number: 115
- Laid down: 27 August 1953
- Launched: 6 June 1954
- Completed: 21 December 1954
- Fate: Sold to Finland, 1964

History

Finland
- Name: Uusimaa
- Namesake: Uusimaa region
- Acquired: 1964
- Commissioned: 1964
- Decommissioned: 1979
- Stricken: 1980
- Fate: Scrapped 1980

General characteristics
- Class & type: Hämeenmaa class; (modified Riga-class frigate)
- Displacement: 1,260 tons; 1,500 tons (full load)
- Length: 91.5 m (300 ft)
- Beam: 10.1 m (33 ft)
- Draft: 3.2 m (10 ft)
- Propulsion: steam turbines, 14,900 kW
- Speed: 28 knots (52 km/h)
- Range: 2,000 nautical miles (3,700 km) at 15 knots
- Complement: 175
- Armament: three 100 mm; two 2 × 37 mm AA; two 2 × 25 mm AA; two Hedgehog ASW; one 3 × 533 mm torpedo tubes

Uusimaa was a Finnish Riga-class frigate. However the class was called the Uusimaa-class in Finland since the ship had some unique modifications (i.e. British submarine hunting equipment).

As the Finnish Navy had a manpower restriction after World War II, the navy suffered personnel shortages after the commissioning of the Turunmaa and Karjala. The navy limited therefore the use of its two Hämeenmaa frigates and finally decided to retire them.

Uusimaa was in Finnish Navy service between 1964–1980. She was decommissioned in 1979 and cannibalized for spare parts for the Hämeenmaa.

== See also ==
- The sister ship Hämeenmaa
