= New Country =

New Country may refer to:

- New Country (Armenia), a political party in Armenia
- New Country (Sirius), a defunct Modern Country radio station on Sirius Satellite Radio
- New Country Party, a political party in Australia
- South Sudan, the current latest country formed on 9 July 2011

== See also ==
- Country music
- Micronation
- Country (disambiguation)
- New Land (disambiguation)
- New states (disambiguation)
