= Nieuw- en Sint Joosland =

- Village
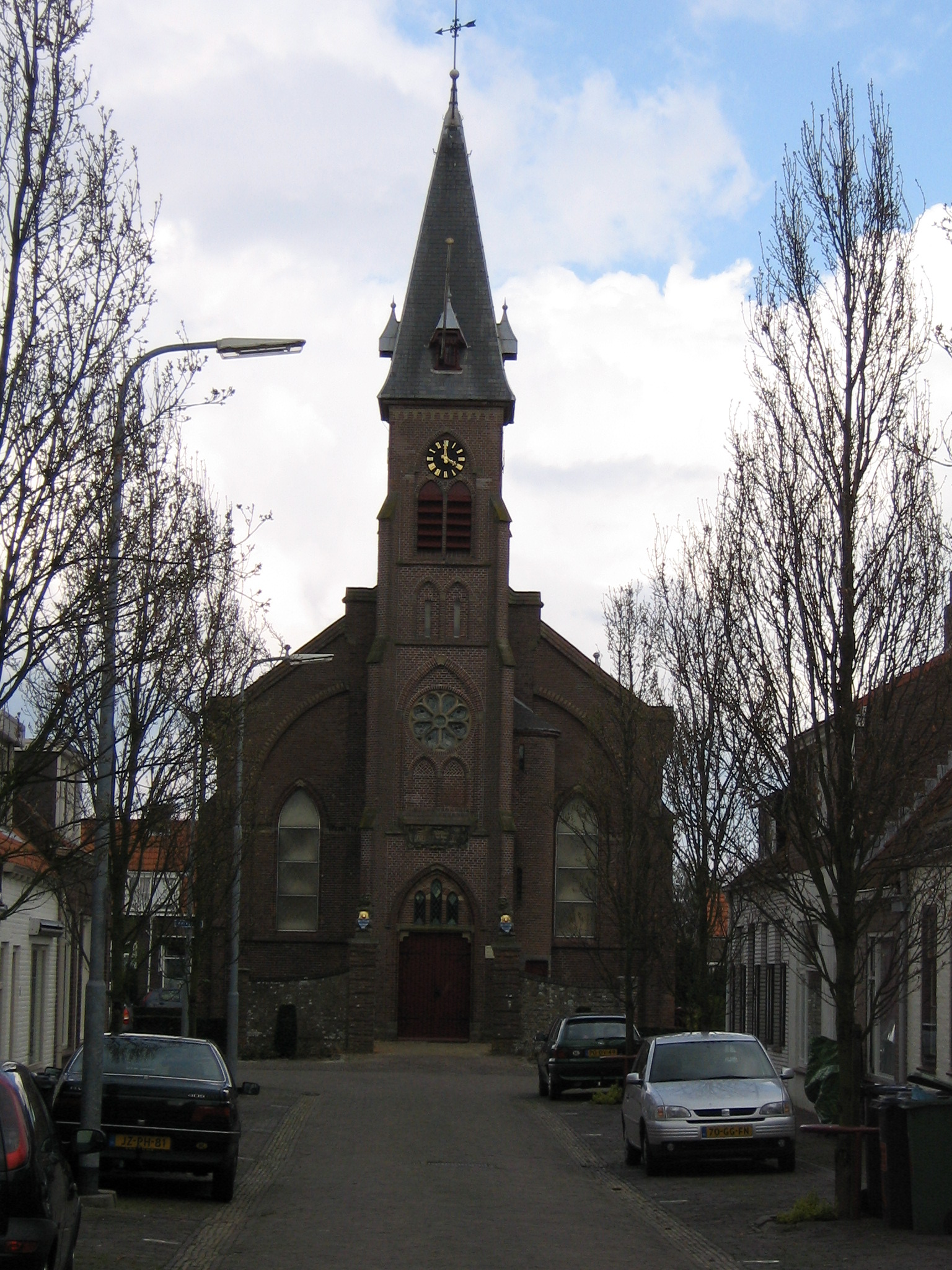

- Coat of arms

- Location in the province of Zeeland in the Netherlands Nieuw- en Sint Joosland (Netherlands)
- Coordinates: 51°28′55″N 3°39′28″E
- Country: Netherlands
- Province: Zeeland
- Municipality: Middelburg

Area
  - Total: 0.50 km^{2} (0.19 sq mi)
- Elevation: 1.4 m (4.6 ft)

Population (2021)
  - Total: 1,165
  - Density: 2,300/km^{2} (6,000/sq mi)
- Time zone: UTC+1 (CET)
  - Summer (DST): UTC+2 (CEST)
- Postal code: 4339
- Dialing code: 0118

Nieuw- en Sint Joosland of Nieuwland (Zeeuws: 't Nieuwland) is a village and a former municipality in the southeast of Walcheren, at the edge of the island, in the municipality Middelburg, in the Dutch province of Zeeland. It has about 1300 inhabitants. Because of its relatively late foundation, Nieuw- en Sint Joosland is not a churchvillage, but more of a wegdorp, despite its clear village centre.

== History: polders and villages in the 17th and 18th centuries ==
Nieuw- en Sint Joosland arose in the seventeenth century, during the time the 'Sloe', the water that split Walcheren in two, began to bog down and the area began to be interesting for polders. In 1603 the city Middelburg bought part of the salt marsh, to sell it in 1644 to the mayor. In 1631 the 'Oud-Sint Jooslandpolder' arose, followed by the 'Middelburgse polder' in 1644. A small core arose in the 'Oud-Sint Jooslandpolder', the actual 'Sint Joosland', but it did not get any bigger; this hamlet is now called 'Oudedorp'. On this new land are, besides some farms, eight sawmills. These helped a lot with the booming trade. People called the 'Middelburgse polder' usually 'Nieuw land(New Land). Multiple polders followed: in 1661 the 'Nieuwerkerkepolder' (Newchurchpolder), in 1671 the 'Nieuw-Sint Jooslandpolder' and in 1672 the 'Molenpolder' (Millpolder). This area is not reachable by land so a ferry over the Welzinge was created. In 1650 the island was big enough for its own church.

== Municipality ==
In 1816 the two municipalities, Nieuwland en Sint Joosland, merged into the new municipality Nieuw- en Sint Joosland, even though the last municipality existed of only one street, the still existing hamlet 'Oudedorp' (Zeelandic: 't Ouwe Durp) and a few farms. Two years later a dam was built through 'Welzinge' connecting the island with the old 'Walcheren'. Middelburg had already dug a channel to Veere, but this was no longer needed. Because of this, the wood industry in 'Nieuw- en Sint Joosland' was redundant, that is why they concentrated on agriculture instead. In 1966 the village 'Nieuwland' and the hamlet 'Oudedorp' were added to Middelburg. More than half of the territory, almost 8 km^{2}, belongs to the municipality Vlissingen, around 7 km^{2} to Middelburg and 7 ha to Arnemuiden. During the municipal reorganization of 1997 the village received the northern part of the 'Nieuw- en Sint Jooslandpolder' back from Vlissingen.

== Buildings ==
The Dutch Reformed Church of 'Nieuwland' was built in 1882; the wall around the church is still from the old church. A bit outside the village is the gristmill 'Buiten Verwachting', built in 1874.

== Gallery ==
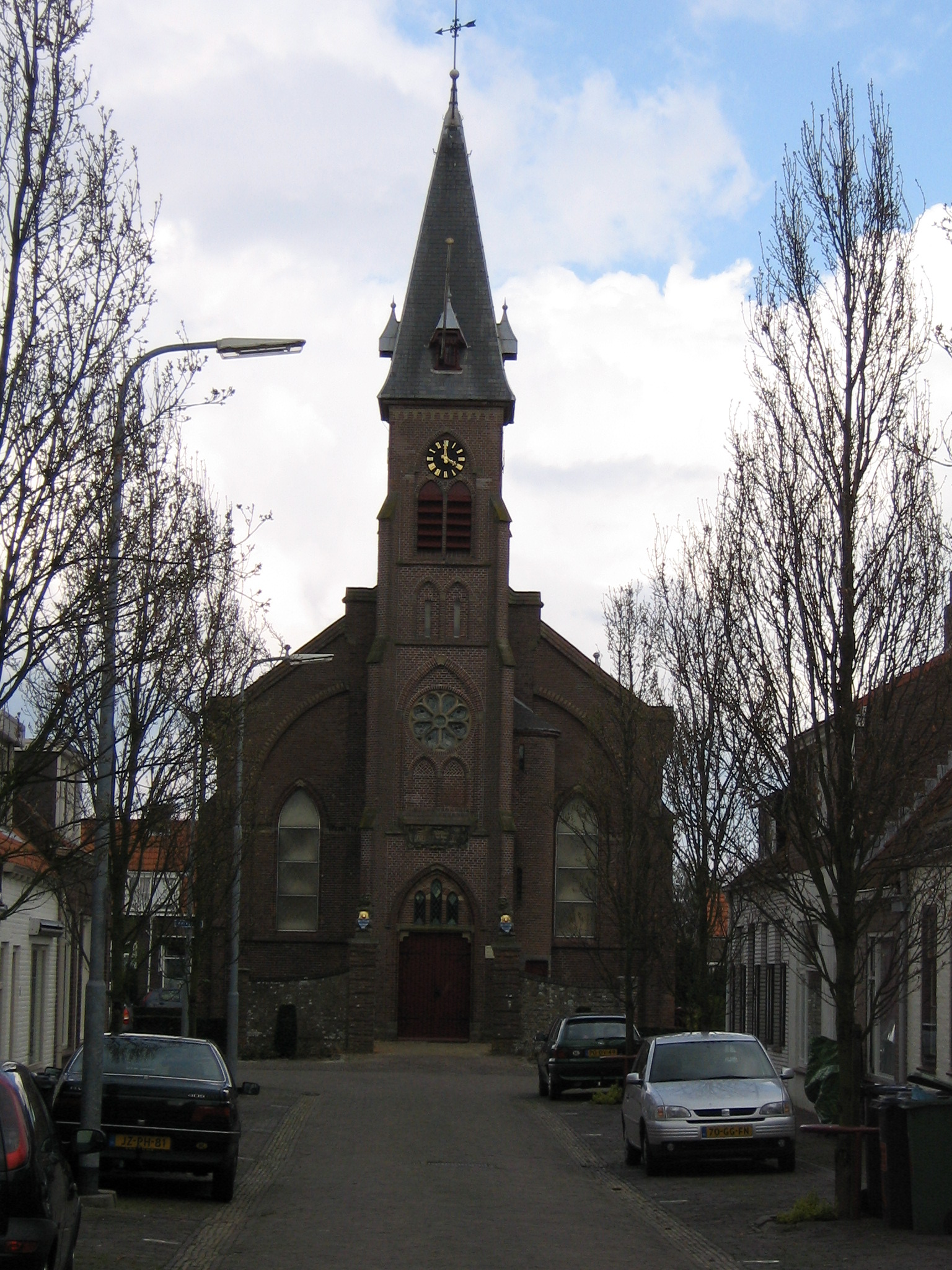
Village church

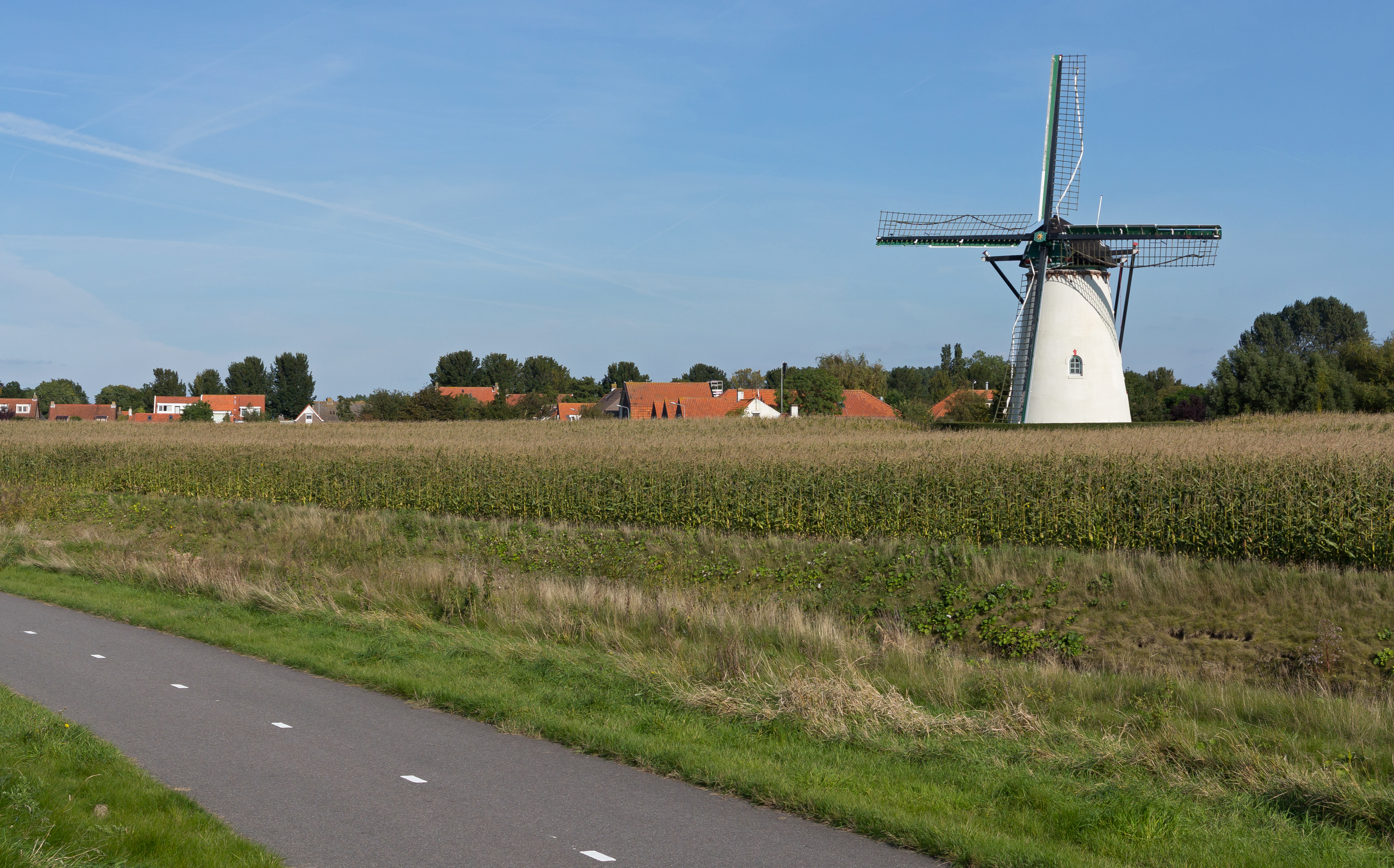
Gristmill 'Buiten Verwachting'
