= Albertus Antonie Nijland =

Dutch astronomer

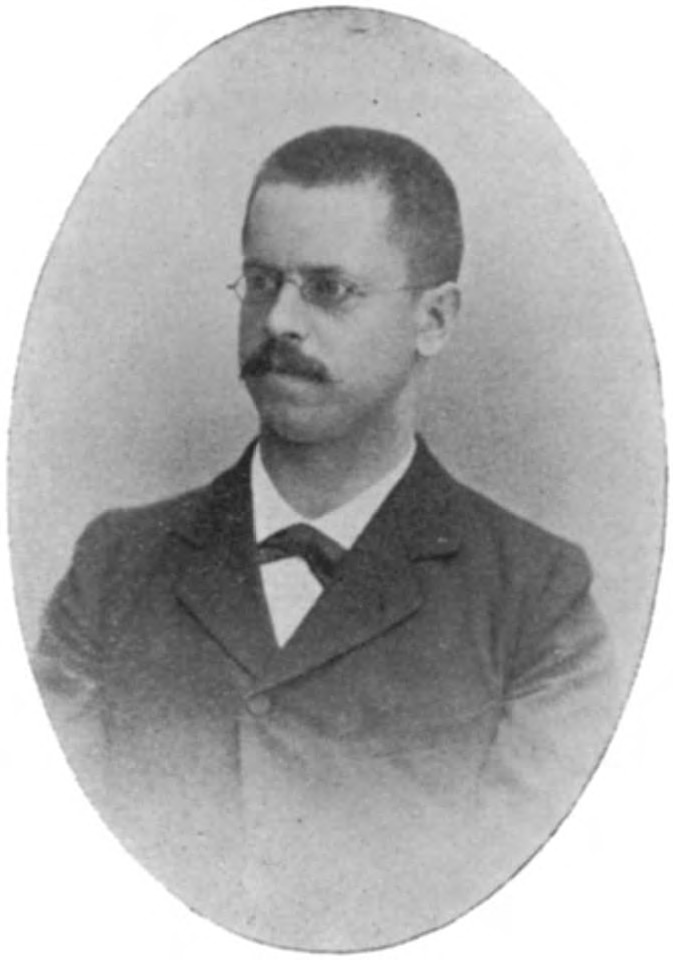
Albertus Antonie Nijland

Albertus (Albert) Antonie Nijland (30 October 1868 – 18 August 1936) was a Dutch astronomer. He was professor of astronomy at the Rijksuniversiteit Utrecht, and served as director of the Sterrewacht Sonnenborgh (now the Sterrekundig Instituut) of the university.

Nijland was born in Utrecht. In 1901 he participated in a Dutch solar eclipse expedition to Karang Sago, Sumatra.

He was noted for his observations of variable stars, and published a number of papers on the subject in Astronomische Nachrichten, and elsewhere, from 1917 until 1936. He proposed naming variable stars in each constellation using a simple numbering system beginning with V1, V2, ... and so forth. However the double-letter system starting with RR was already in widespread use. As a result, variable stars after QZ were numbered according to Nijland's system beginning with V335.

In 1923 Nijland became member of the Royal Netherlands Academy of Arts and Sciences.

The crater Nijland on the Moon is named after him.
