= New states =

New states may refer to:

== Creating new sovereign states (countries) ==
- List of proposed state mergers to create new sovereign states
- Lists of active separatist movements
- List of historical separatist movements

== Creating new administrative subdivisions within countries ==
- 51st state, possible new states in the United States
- List of U.S. state partition proposals
- New states of Germany, five German states recreated in 1990
- List of proposed states of Australia
- List of proposed provinces and territories of Canada
- List of proposed states and territories of India

== See also ==
- Estado Novo (disambiguation)
- State (disambiguation)
- New (disambiguation)
- New Land (disambiguation)
- New Country (disambiguation)
- New areas of the People's Republic of China (special economic new urban zones)
- New Territories, Hong Kong, China
- New Territory, Texas
