= Ruotsinsalmi sea fortress =

Fortress in Kotka, Finland

Coordinates: 60°26′58″N 26°56′15″E

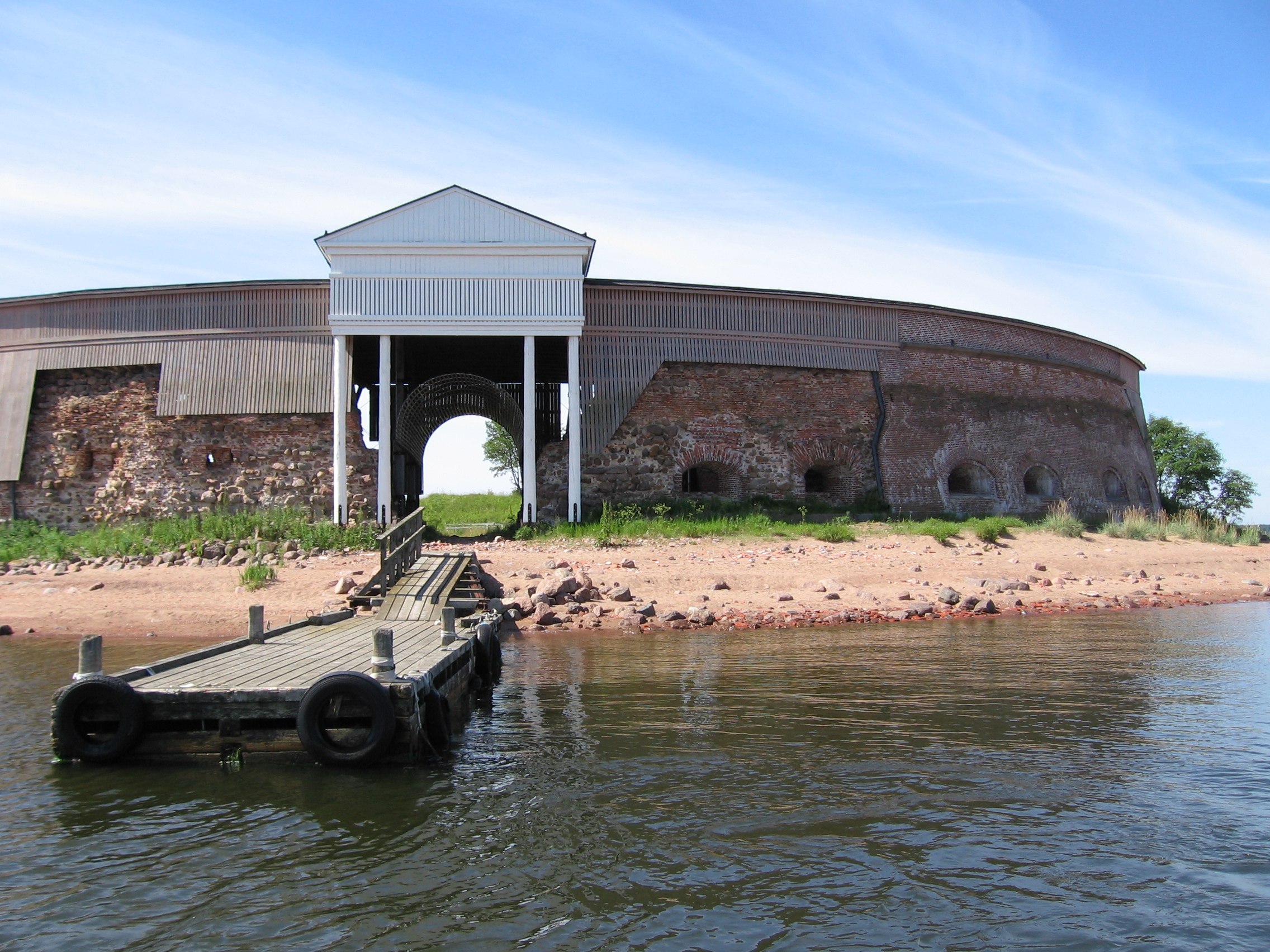
Fort Slava in Kukouri island

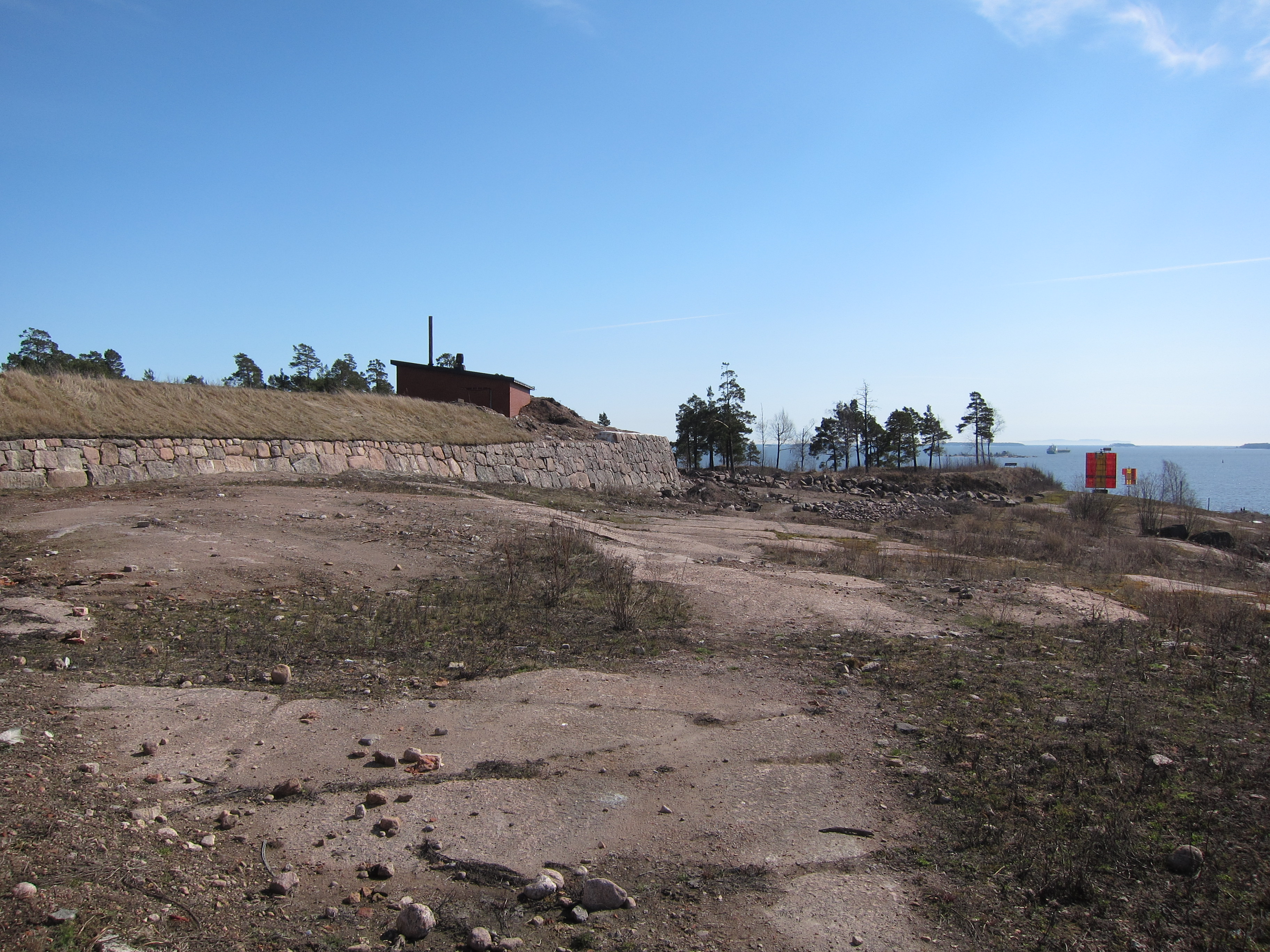
Ruins of Fort Katarina

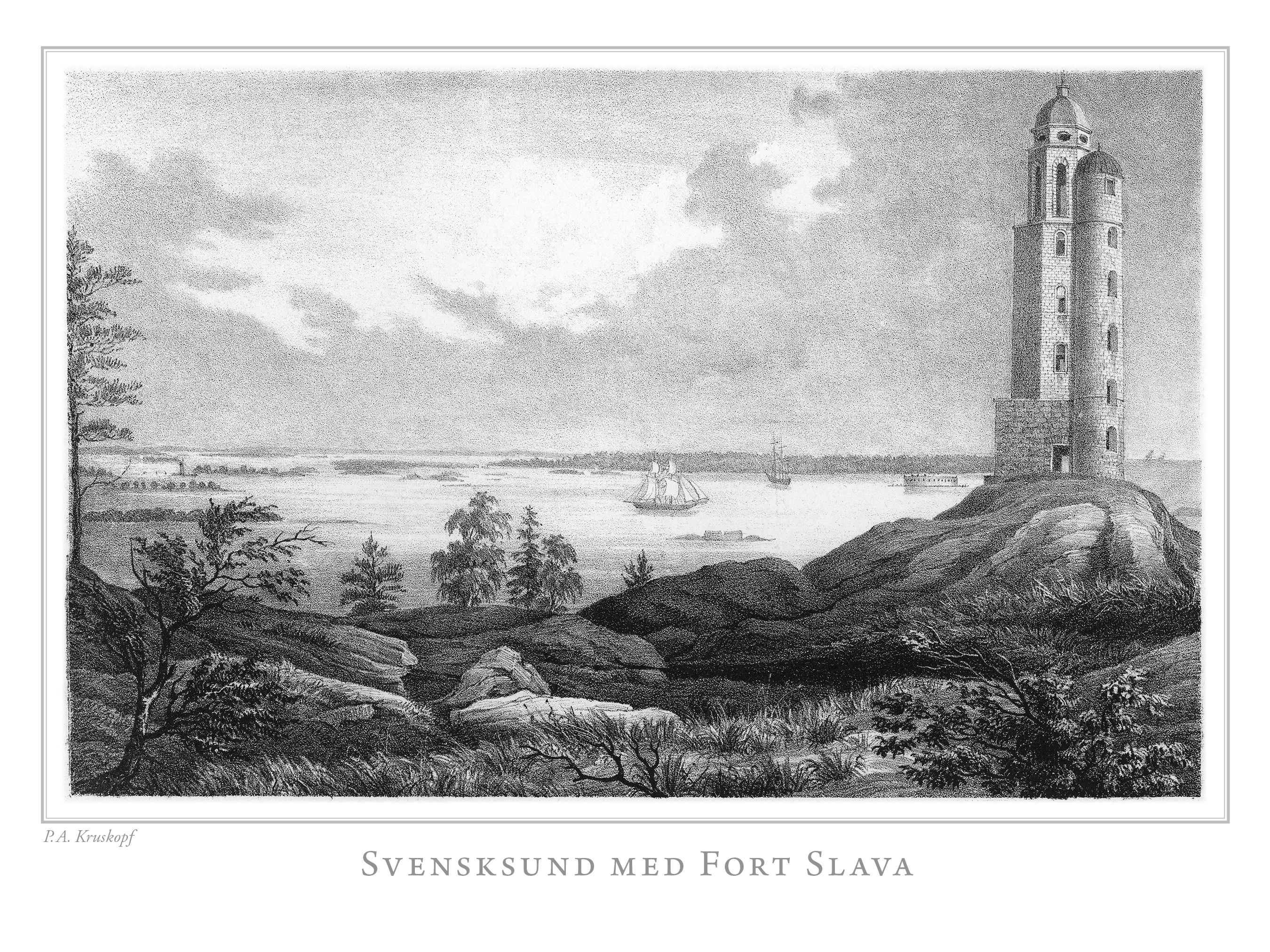
Illustration in Finland framstäldt i teckningar edited by Zacharias Topelius and published 1845-1852.

Ruotsinsalmi sea fortress (Finnish: Ruotsinsalmen merilinnoitus, Swedish: Svensksund, Russian: Морская крепость Руотсинсальми; both names meaning Swedish Strait) is a fortification system in Kotka, Finland. It is part of the South-Eastern Finland fortification system built by Russia after Russo-Swedish War of 1788-1790. Ruotsinsalmi sea fortress formed the southern part of a double fortress together with Kyminlinna and it was built to counter the Swedish sea fortresses of Svartholm in Loviisa and Sveaborg (Suomenlinna) in Helsinki. Ruotsinsalmi also acted as an outpost of the Kronstadt sea fortress in Saint Petersburg. During the Crimean War, a British-French fleet destroyed the Ruotsinsalmi fortifications in 1855.

Ruotsinsalmi sea fortress is composed of a number of separate forts, redoubts, and artillery batteries. The main fortress was the Fort Katarina located on the southern part of Kotkansaari island in the present-day Katariina neighbourhood. Other larger forts were Fort Elisabeth in Varissaari island and Fort Slava in Kukouri island. Remnants of smaller forts can also be found, for example, in Tiutinen island.

== Sources ==
- www.kotka.fi
- www.kotka.fi - linnoitushistoria
- Varissaari (Fort Elisabeth) - Finnish Wikipedia

== See also ==
- First naval battle of Svensksund, 1789
- Second naval battle of Svensksund, 1790
- Kyminlinna
