= Sankt Nikolai =

Sankt Nikolai may refer to the following municipalities in Styria, Austria:

- Sankt Nikolai im Sausal
- Sankt Nikolai im Sölktal
- Sankt Nikolai ob Draßling

or

- the Russian frigate Sankt Nikolai
