= Ordin =

Ordin, feminine: Ordina is a Russian surname. Ordina is also a Hungarian surname, of different etymology.

== Russian ==
- Afanasy Ordin-Nashchokin
- Antonina Ordina (born 1962), Soviet/Swedish former cross-country skier
- Kesar Ordin (1835–1892),Russian statesman, amateur historian, and author
- Vera Ordina (born 1968), Russian hurdler

== Hungarian ==
- Tibor Ordina, Hungarian athlete
