= Hörzendorfer See =

Body of water in Carinthia, Austria

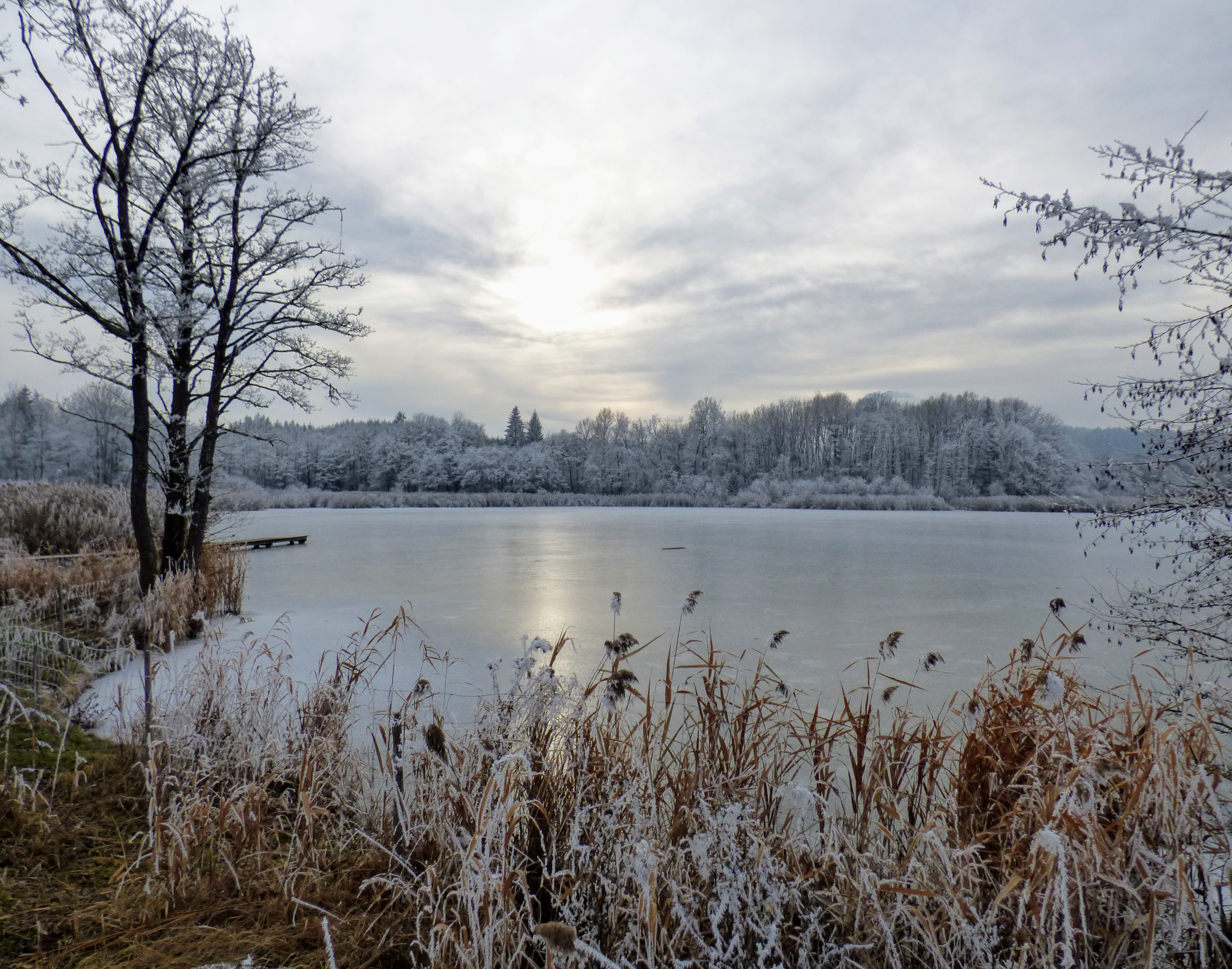
- Hörzendorfer Lake in winter

- Location within Austria
- Location: Carinthia, Austria
- Coordinates: 46°43′25″N 14°20′20″E
- Type: lake

Hörzendorfer See is a lake of Carinthia, Austria. It is an artificial lake located approximately 3 km south of the town of Sankt Veit an der Glan at an elevation of about 517 m above sea level. The lake has a surface area of 6.36 hectares, has a maximum depth of about 5 m.
