= Fort Elisabeth =

Fort Elisabeth or Fort Elizabeth may refer to:

- Fort Elisabeth (Ruotsinsalmi fortress), Finland
- Fort Elizabeth Meagher, Montana, US
- Russian Fort Elizabeth, Hawaii, US

== See also ==
- Elizabeth Fort, in Ireland
- Fortress of St. Elizabeth, in Ukraine
- All pages with titles containing both Fort and Elisabeth/Elizabeth
