= Battle of Svensksund =

1790 naval battle of the Russo-Swedish War 1788

Second Battle of Svensksund / Rochensalm / Ruotsinsalmi
- Part of the Russo-Swedish War (1788–1790)
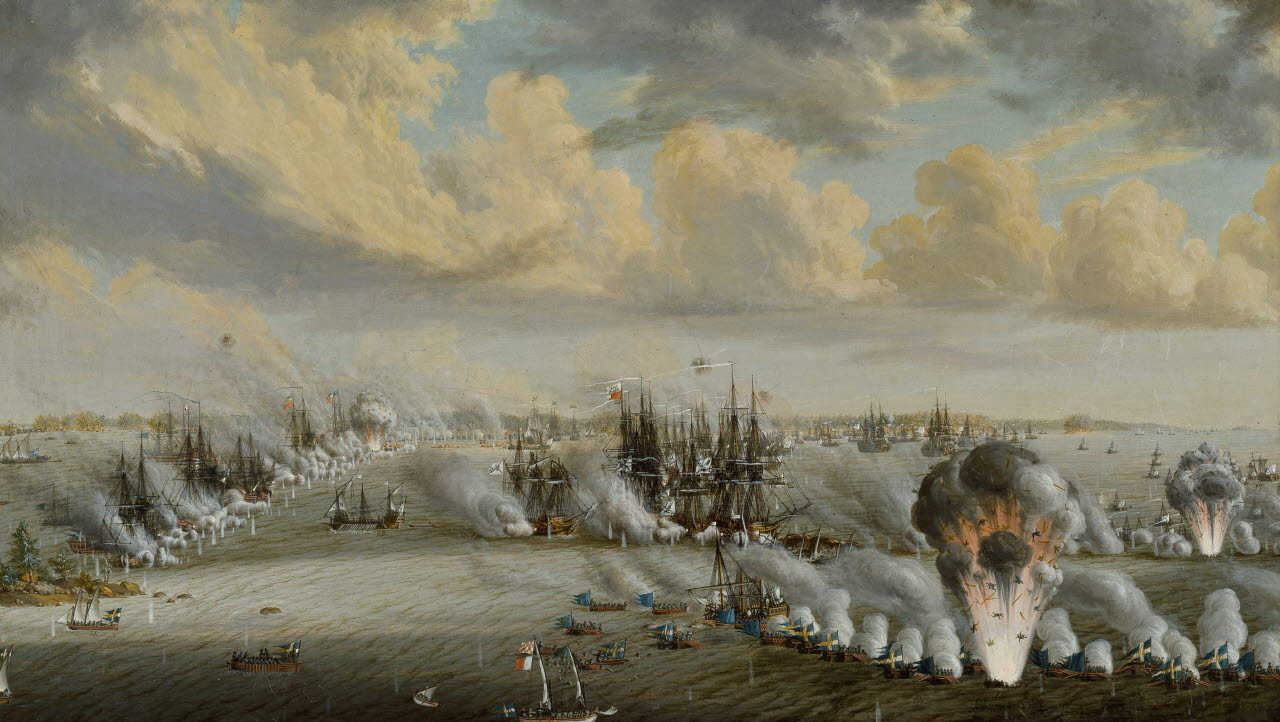
- The battle as depicted by Swedish painter Johan Tietrich Schoultz
Date	9–10 July 1790 (28–29 June O.S.)
Location	Svensksund (now Kotka, south-eastern Finland) 60°26′00″N 26°57′30″E
Result	Swedish victory

Belligerents
Sweden	Russia

Commanders and leaders
Gustav III of Sweden; Carl Olof Cronstedt	Karl von Nassau

Strength
14,000 men; 275 ships^{[a]}	18,500 men; 200–274 ships^{[b]}

Casualties and losses
600–700 killed and wounded; 6 ships sunk or destroyed^{[c]}	10,000 killed, wounded and captured; 50–80 ships sunk, destroyed or captured^{[d]}
- Notes: ^[a]The Swedish archipelago fleet consisted of roughly 275 ships of various sizes with a total of over 14,000 men present, of these close to 13,000 were combat personnel with 206 ships while 1,200 men and 69 ships were on transport, hospital and other various civilian duties. There were a total of about 1,300 Swedish artillery pieces present, of which around 860 were swivel guns and 450 heavy cannons.; ^[b]The Russian fleet had roughly the same numbers as the Swedish, 274 ships or 200 although with heavier tonnage. There were about 18,500 men in total present with between 850 and 1,000 heavy cannons and almost as many swivel guns, resulting in around 1,600 or more artillery pieces in total.; ^[c]The Swedes suffered 171 dead and 122 seriously wounded in the action or 600–700 men in total applying the lightly wounded to the number. One Udema, two gun sloops and one gun yawl sank and one bomb ketch and one gun slope exploded, totalling six ships.; ^[d] The Russian losses are unknown but were significant. A lower estimation was made by Russian naval historian V. F. Golovachev who put the casualties to 7,369 men while another writer (Poselt) puts them as high as 14,648 men. Swedish historian Arnold Munthe estimates the Russian casualties to at least 9,000 men, but probably more considering the fact that captured Russian officers reportedly estimated 12,000 themselves. Kesar Ordin, another Russian historian finds the number of 10,000 Russian casualties, presented by some Swedish historians, as a realistic alternative of these a little over 6,000 were captured and 350 wounded, additionally 50–80 or more ships were lost. Meanwhile, Finnish historian Tapani Mattila estimates the Russian losses at 1,400 dead or wounded and 6,000 captured.

The Second Battle of Svensksund (Finnish: Ruotsinsalmi; Russian: Роченсальм) was a naval battle fought in the Gulf of Finland outside the present day city of Kotka on 9 and 10 July 1790. The Swedish naval forces dealt the Russian fleet a devastating defeat that brought an end to the Russo-Swedish War (1788–1790). The battle is the biggest Swedish naval victory and the largest naval battle ever in the Baltic Sea. It qualifies among the largest naval battles in history in terms of the number of vessels involved.

== Background ==
Circumstances in the 1780s, including the war between the Russian Empire and the Ottoman Empire, and the moving of a portion of the Russian Baltic Fleet to the Black Sea, prompted the Swedish king, Gustav III, to attack Russia in 1788. The war was also initiated to distract domestic attention from political problems and for Gustav III to be able to fulfill his role as a successful and powerful monarch.

Gustav's main aim was to recapture some of the territory in Finland that had been lost to the Russians in the war of 1741–43. In 1788, he launched a surprise attack against the Russian fleet. The plan was to attack Kronstadt and land a force to assault the capital, St Petersburg.

The war was intended to be short and to be won by the assault on St Petersburg, conducted by the navy and skärgårdsflottan (the "archipelago fleet"). The latter, officially designated as arméns flotta ("fleet of the army") was a separate branch of the armed forces designed for coastal operations and amphibious warfare in the Baltic. Since its formation in 1756, it had been something of an elite force within the Swedish armed forces. However, after the Battle of Hogland (1788) (a tactical tie but a strategic failure for the Swedes) Gustav lost the initiative and tensions in Sweden rose. The First Battle of Svensksund on 24 August 1789 ended in a Swedish defeat.

== Prelude ==
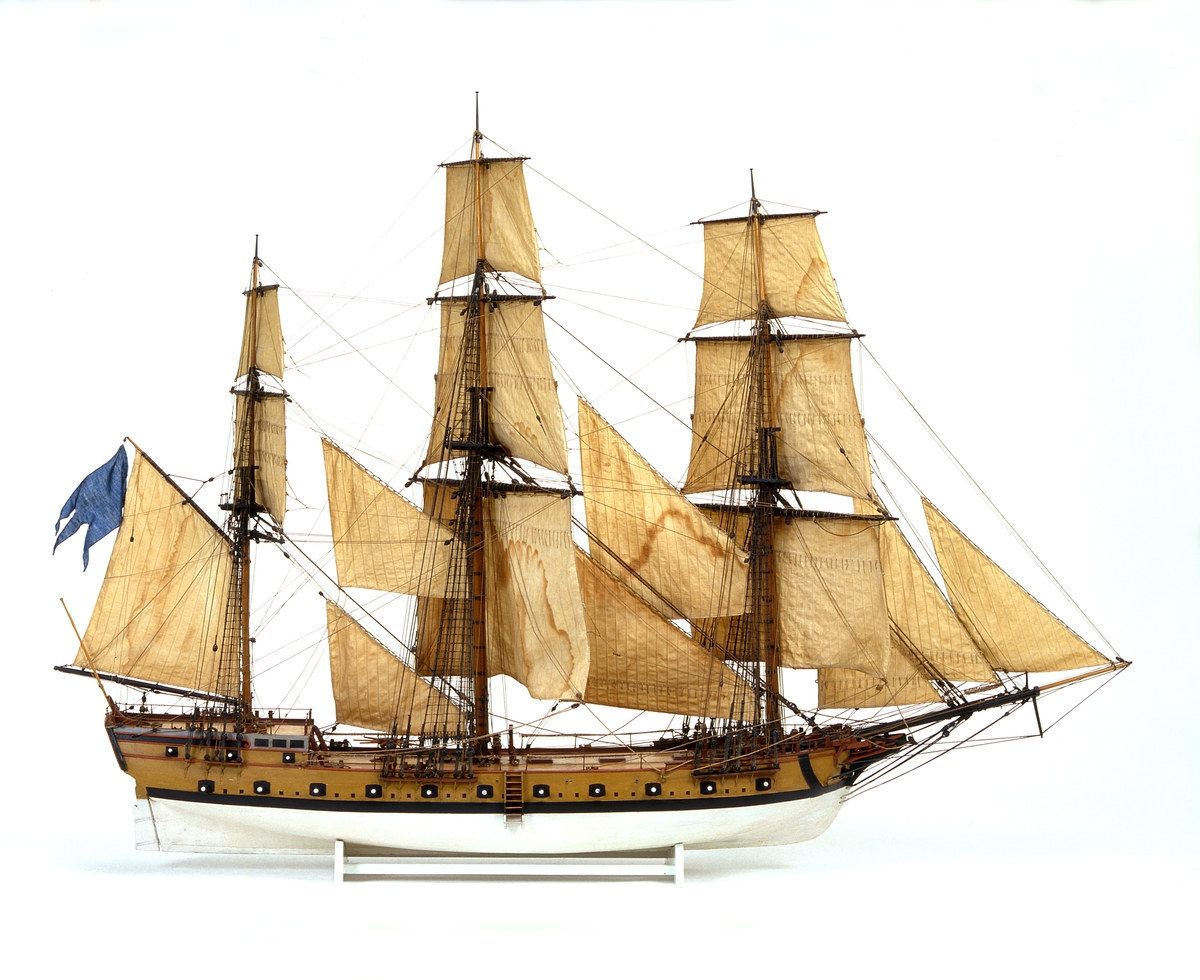
Model of the hemmema Styrbjörn in the Maritime Museum in Stockholm. Styrbjörn was one of two ships of the type that participated in the battle.

In 1790 an attempt to assault Vyborg failed, and the Swedish Navy along with King Gustav himself, was caught in the Bay of Viborg. It managed to escape through the "Viborg gauntlet" on 3 July, though with heavy losses to the deep-sea navy. After retreating to Svensksund, King Gustav made a decision to make a stand there. The Swedish coastal fleet was reinforced by 40 ships under Lieutenant-Colonel Carl Olof Cronstedt after the escape from Vyborg. Gustav made the decision to lead the fight personally and divided his forces into four brigades under lieutenant-colonels Carl Olof Cronstedt, Claes Hjelmstjerna, Victor von Stedingk, and Jakob Törning. Von Stedingk was to lead the center consisting of two hemmema (Styrbjörn and Starkotter) and two udema (Torborg and Ingeborg) archipelago frigates, brig Alexander, 15 galleys, two half-galleys, and 11 cannon or mortar longboats. Törning had the command of the right wing consisting of 39 gun sloops and 22 gun yawls while Hjelmstierna's left wing had 30 gun sloops and 14 gun yawls supported by 12 gun sloops and yawls from Cronstedt's brigade. The rest of Cronstedt's brigade, consisting of the turuma Norden, one galley and 36 gun sloops and yawls, was to remain in reserve and guard against a possible Russian flanking maneuver. Artillery batteries were constructed on the skerries of Kråkskär (between the center and right wings) and Sandskär (between the center and left wings). On 8 July the preparations were completed.

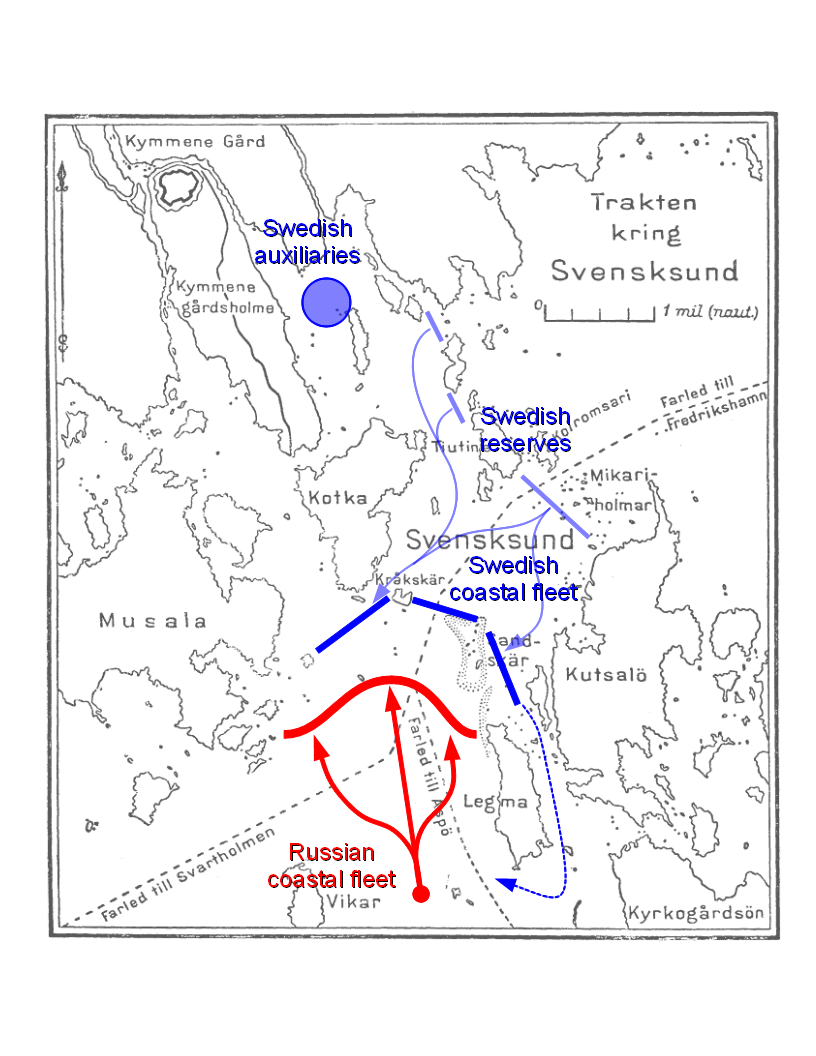
Map of the operations during the Second Battle of Svensksund

The Russian coastal fleet consisted of nine archipelago frigates, 13 xebecs, two mortar ships, four gun prams, three floating batteries, 26 galleys, six schooners, four cutters, 77 gun sloops and 121 lightly armed boats. The Russian fleet carried around 900 cannons compared to 450 Swedish cannons and had clear superiority in both number of ships and men. The Russian coastal fleet was eager to attack, especially on 9 July, the anniversary of Catherine the Great's proclamation as Empress of Russia. Recognizing the failure to decisively defeat the Swedish archipelago fleet a year earlier at the same location, the Russian commander, Prince Charles of Nassau-Siegen, chose to commit his whole force from the south. This was done to prevent the Swedes from escaping to the shelter of Svartholm fortress since Nassau-Siegen was expecting a clear victory, having numerical superiority in ships, artillery as well as in men.

On the morning of 9 July Gustav III suddenly named Lieutenant-Colonel Cronstedt as his flag-captain after relieving Colonel George de Frese from his duties. The reason for this sudden change was likely that de Frese had been in favor of withdrawing from Svensksund to a more favorable location while Cronstedt had advocated fighting the Russians at Svensksund.

== Battle ==
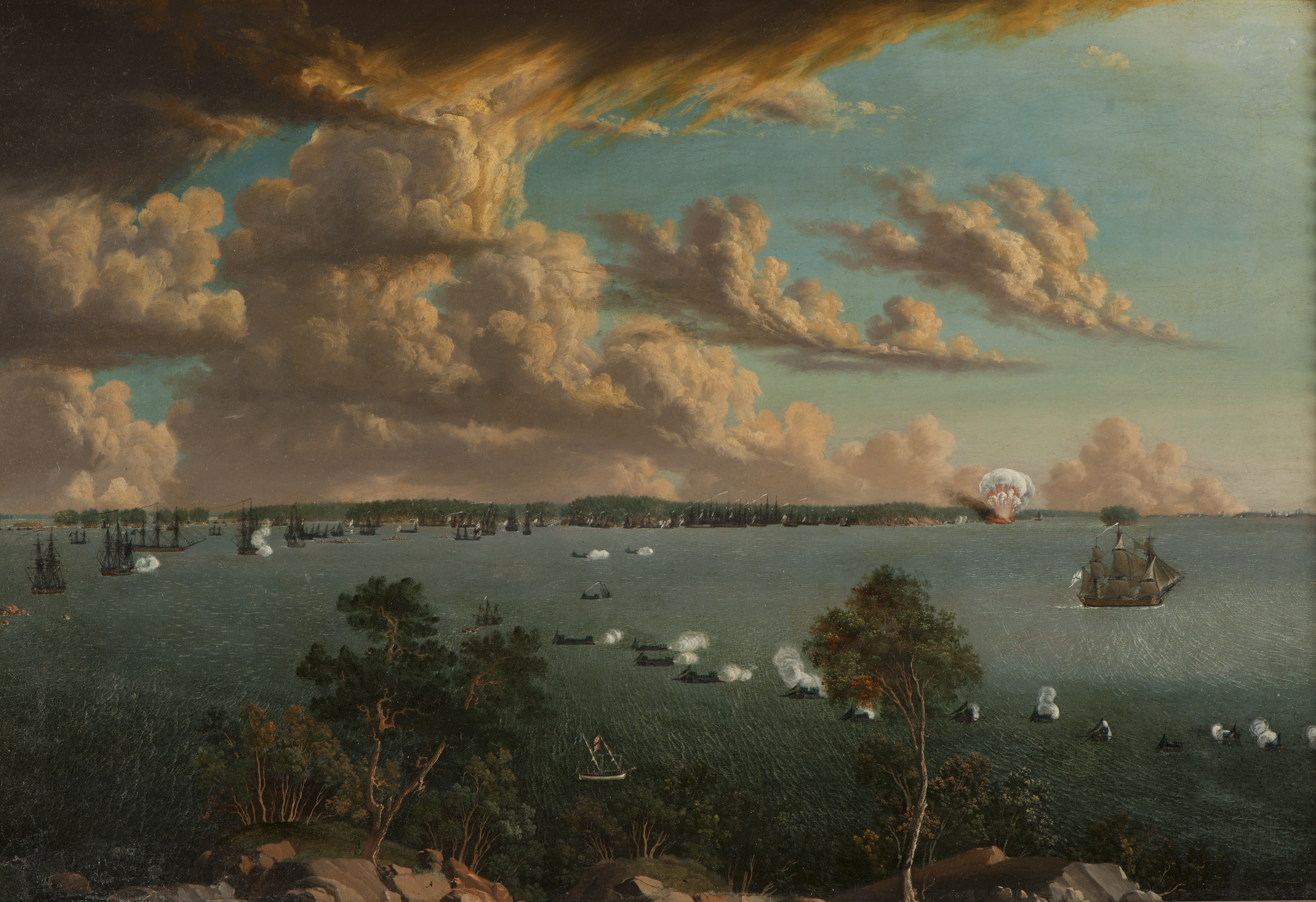
Depiction of an episode of the battle by Johan Tietrich Schoultz

At 08:00 on 9 July the Russian flagship signaled the attack. By 09:30 the first ships had reached firing distance in the western flank but soon after fighting spread throughout the battle lines. The Swedish right wing under Lieutenant Colonel Törning met with increasing resistance as the Russian left wing opposing him was reinforced. However, the Swedes were able to move ships from their reserves to support their right wing with a counterattack which managed to lead the Russian left wing into disorder. Meanwhile, an increasingly strong southwesterly wind forced the Russian center deeper between converging Swedish lines. The strong winds also made it difficult for the Russians to aim their guns, a problem affecting the Swedish ships much less, as the Russian ships acted as a wavebreaker in front of them.

After no Russian ships were seen approaching from Fredrikshamn, the Swedes were able to release more ships from their reserves to bolster the Swedish left wing led by Lieutenant Colonel Hjelmstierna. Half of Hjelmstierna's ships were sent to the rear of the Russian fleet through a narrow passage between Legma and Kutsalö which in turn forced the Russian right wing to deploy accordingly. However, movement to the back of the line was read as a signal to withdraw by the Russian left wing which started its retreat leaving the Russian center to face the Swedes alone.

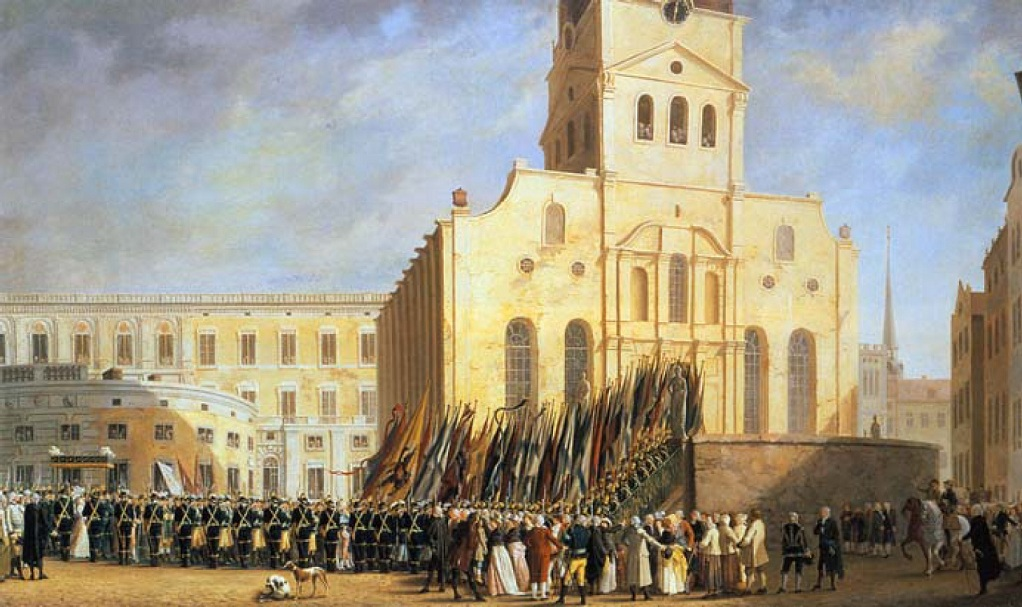
Trophies from the battle taken into Storkyrkan in Stockholm, painting by Pehr Hilleström

By the evening it had become apparent that the Swedes were victorious even though the Russian center, consisting of their galleys and largest ships, continued to fight despite unfavorable winds and battle damage. At this time the Swedes were able to fire at the Russian ships from the front as well as from both sides and several Russian ships started drifting into the Swedish battle line. Other Russian ships caught fire or were intentionally set on fire, while a few were beached to avoid sinking. At 20:00 Naussau-Siegen ordered the Russian fleet to withdraw and to destroy drifting Russian ships in order to keep them from being captured. Strong winds made the withdrawal difficult and several ships failed to escape. A few Russian ships ignored the order to withdraw and instead kept fighting until they sank. Fighting did not end until 22:00. The wind calmed down during the night and several Russian ships tried to escape under the cover of darkness but Swedish gun sloops and yawls were sent to hunt them down, and this fighting continued until 09:00 on the morning of 10 July 1790.

The Russians lost at least 7,400 of 14,000 men; 1,400 dead, wounded and 6,000 captured, compared with Swedish losses of one udema, five minor vessels and 300 men; others place the number of dead and wounded Swedes to around 600. Among the Russian ships that were lost were 10 "archipelago frigates" (sail/oar hybrids) and xebecs, nine half-xebecs (schooners), 16 galleys, four gun prams and floating batteries, seven bomb vessels, five gun sloops and several other small vessels. Along with 21 other ships the Swedes captured the Catarina, Nassau-Siegen's flagship.

The battle of Svensksund is the biggest naval battle ever fought in the Baltic Sea: 500 ships (including supply ships and other ships not involved in combat), over 30,000 men and several thousand cannons. At Svensksund, the Swedes boasted that they destroyed 40 percent of the Russian coastal fleet.

== Aftermath ==
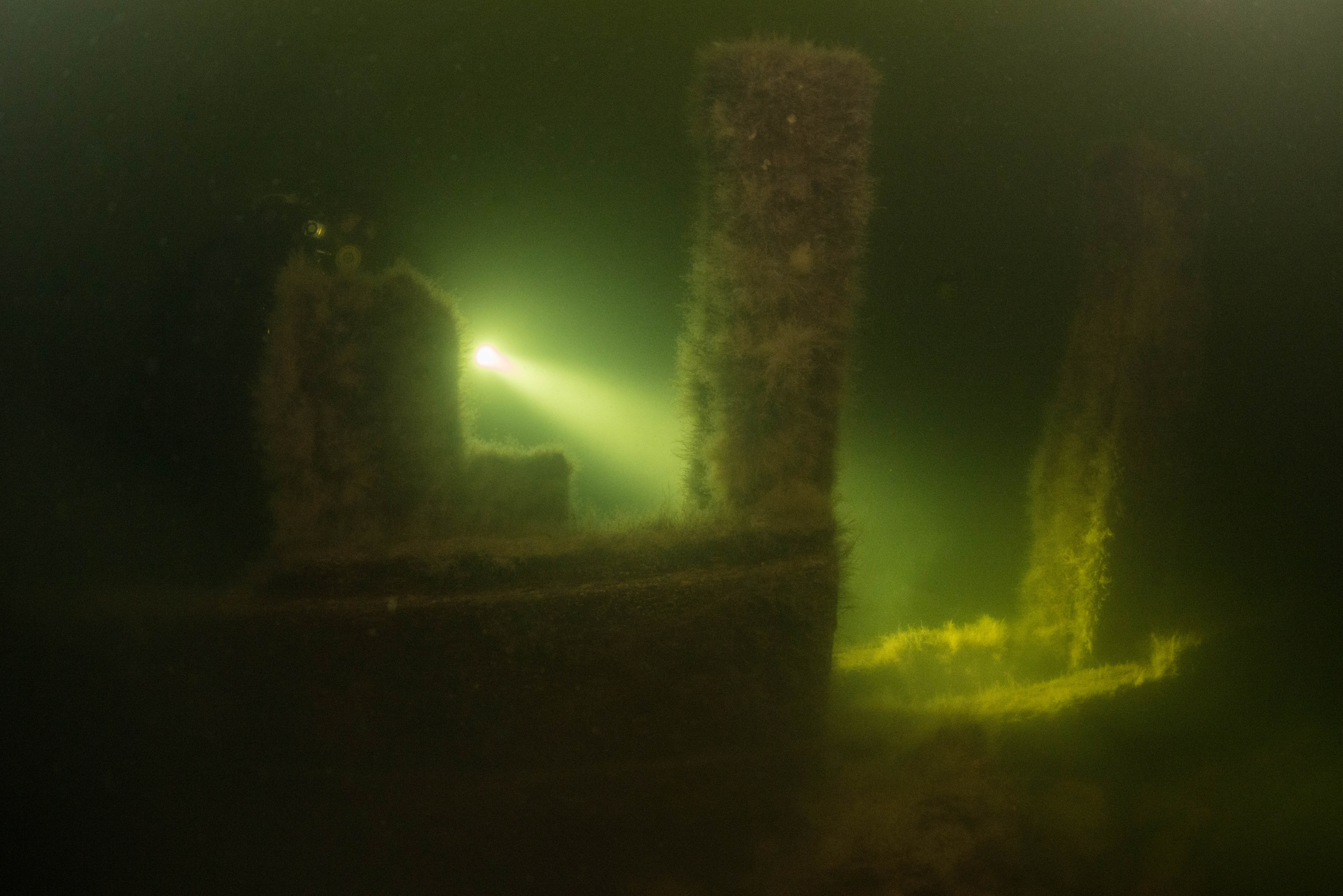
The wreck of the Russian frigate Sankt Nikolai

Surviving Russian ships gathered at Frederikshamn where the badly depleted fleet was being rebuilt while the Swedish coastal fleet stayed at Svensksund. The Swedes later sent a squadron of 25 gun sloops closer to Frederikshamn but they were turned back on 5 August by the rebuilt Russian coastal fleet. The Swedes withdrew back to Svensksund but the Russians did not give chase.

This defeat encouraged Russia to negotiate with Sweden, eventually signing the Treaty of Värälä on 14 August 1790. Neither side gained any territory, however all provisions in the peace treaty of Nystad from 1721 that formally infringed upon Swedish sovereignty were cancelled. After the war the Russians started a massive fortification programme on the eastern, Russian, side of the Kymi river, building the sea fortresses Fort Slava, Fort Elisabeth and the land fortress Kyminlinna. The forts later grew into the port city of Kotka.

The Russian frigate Sankt Nikolai was one of the ships sunk in the battle. She was found in 1948 off Kotka, almost intact. Over 2,300 objects have been recovered from her hull by divers.
