= Sankt Veit am Vogau =

- Former municipality
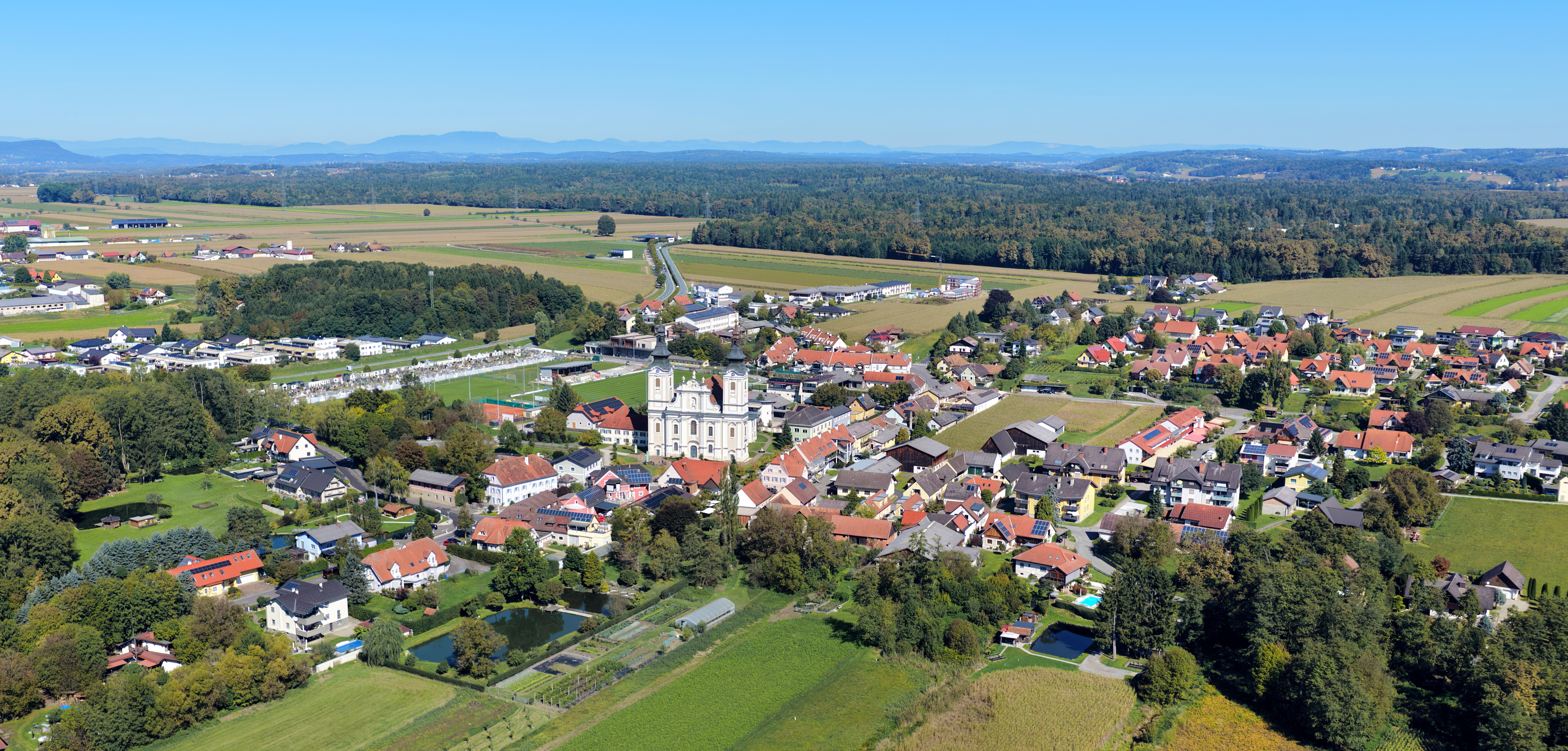
- Aerial view with church

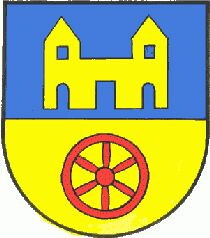
- Coat of arms

- Location within Austria
- Coordinates: 46°44′52″N 15°37′36″E
- Country: Austria
- State: Styria
- District: Leibnitz

Area
  - Total: 25.9 km^{2} (10.0 sq mi)
- Elevation: 262–297 m (860–974 ft)

Population (1 January 2016)
  - Total: 1,918
  - Density: 74.1/km^{2} (192/sq mi)
- Time zone: UTC+1 (CET)
  - Summer (DST): UTC+2 (CEST)
- Postal code: 8423
- Area code: 03453
- Vehicle registration: LB
- Website: www.st-veit-vogau.gv.at

Sankt Veit am Vogau is a former municipality in the district of Leibnitz in Styria, Austria. Since the 2015 Styria municipal structural reform, it is part of the municipality Sankt Veit in der Südsteiermark.

== Homophobia and Islamophobia ==
In March 2013 the small town created a large nationwide publicity, when the town's mayor, Manfred Tatzl from ÖVP told falter.at in an interview, "Wir sind hier auf dem Land, Homosexualität verurteilt ein jeder." ("We are living in a rural area, everybody here condemns homosexuality.") and added, "[es gebe] "Gott sei Dank" keine Muslime im Ort" (there were, "Thank God, [...] no muslims in town.") in order to defend the town's reverend Karl Tropper, who had been preaching against homosexuality and Islam for years.
