= Weinburg am Saßbach =

- Former municipality
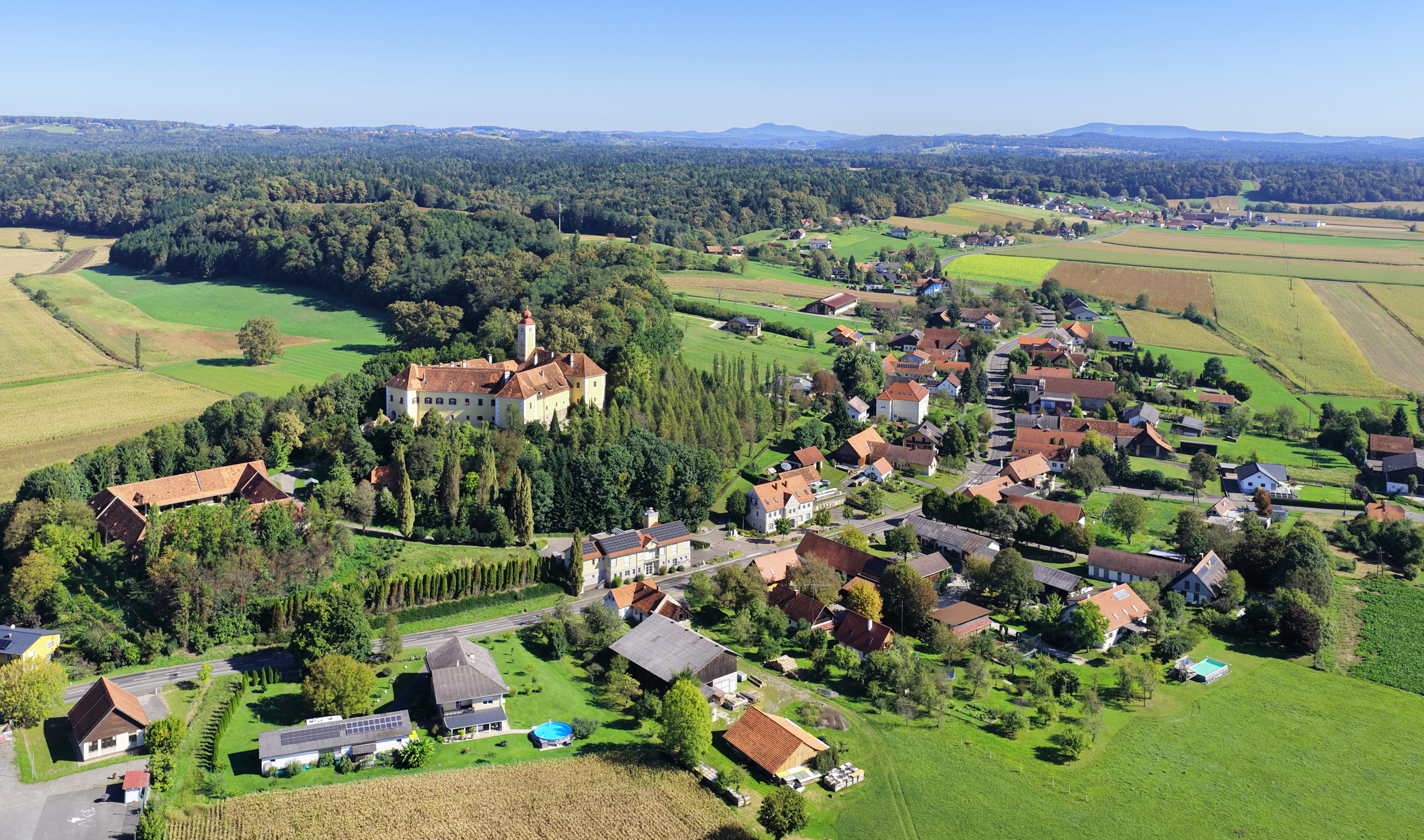
- South-southwest view of Ehrenhausen am Saßbach

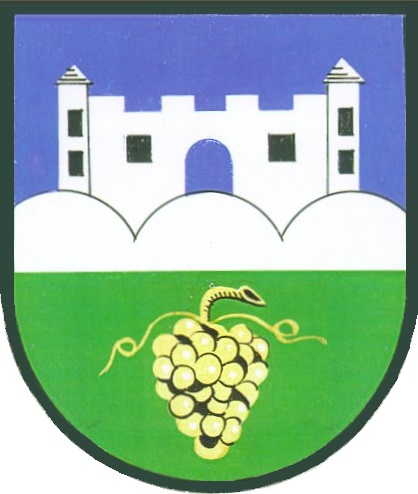
- Coat of arms

- Location within Austria
- Coordinates: 46°45′15″N 15°43′19″E
- Country: Austria
- State: Styria
- District: Leibnitz

Area
  - Total: 25 km^{2} (9.7 sq mi)
- Elevation: 276 m (906 ft)

Population (1 January 2016)
  - Total: 1,052
  - Density: 42/km^{2} (110/sq mi)
- Time zone: UTC+1 (CET)
  - Summer (DST): UTC+2 (CEST)
- Postal code: 8481
- Area code: 03472
- Vehicle registration: RA
- Website: www.weinburg-sassbach.at

Weinburg am Saßbach is a former municipality in the district of Südoststeiermark in the Austrian state of Styria. Since the 2015 Styria municipal structural reform, it is part of the municipality Sankt Veit in der Südsteiermark, in the Leibnitz District.

== Population ==
Historical population
Year	Pop.	±%
1869	1,179	—
1880	1,278	+8.4%
1890	1,248	−2.3%
1900	1,201	−3.8%
1910	1,248	+3.9%
1923	1,235	−1.0%
1934	1,198	−3.0%
1939	1,241	+3.6%
1951	1,251	+0.8%
1961	1,132	−9.5%
1971	1,096	−3.2%
1981	1,114	+1.6%
1991	1,120	+0.5%
2001	1,133	+1.2%
2012	1,052	−7.1%
