= Archipelago fleet =

Arméns flotta Fleet of the army
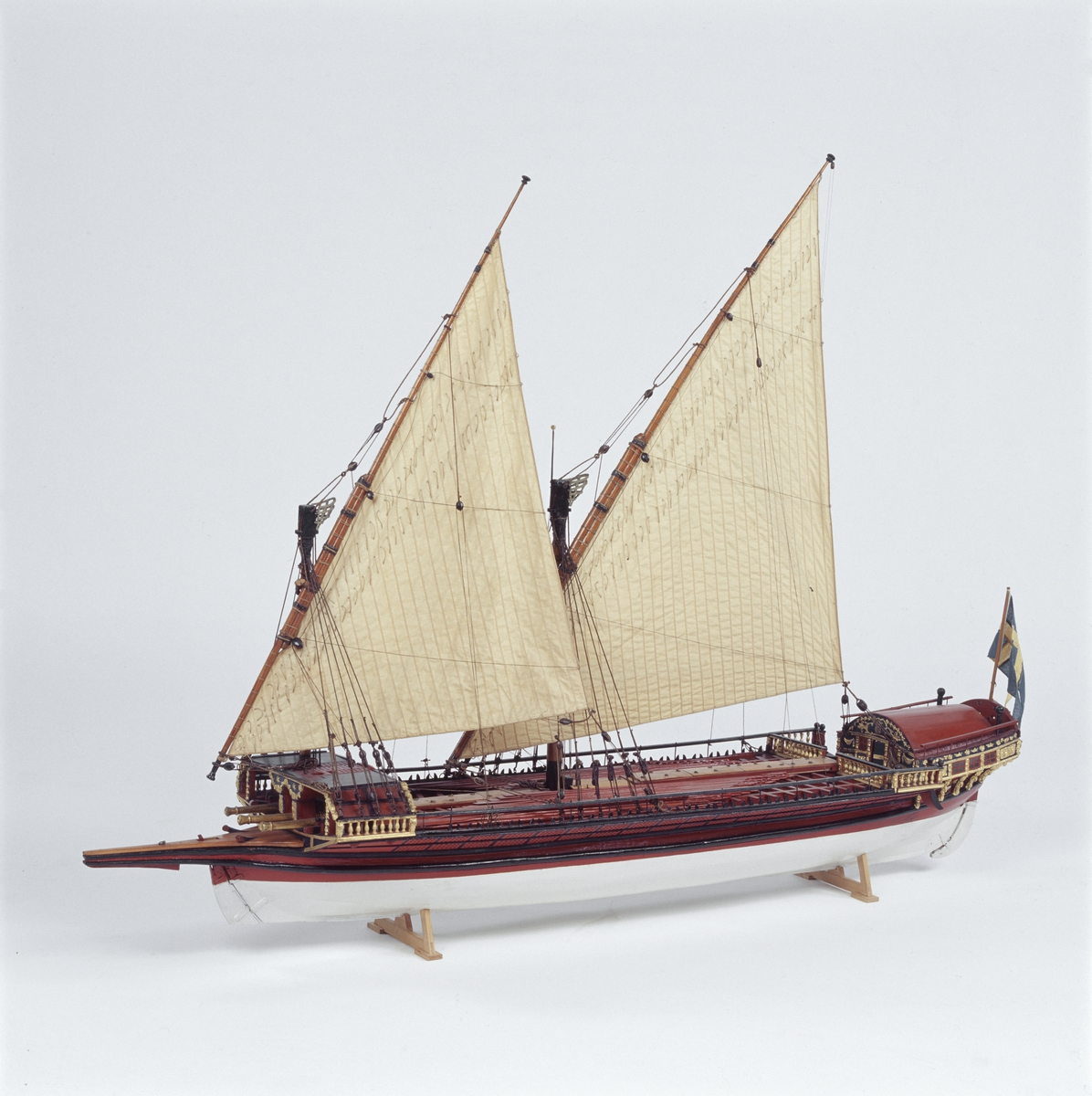
- Active: 1756–1823
- Disbanded: 1823
- Country: Sweden
- Branch: Army
- Type: Fleet
- Role: Coastal defence, amphibious warfare
- Size: 285 ships (1790)
- H/Q: Stockholm
- Colours: Blue
- Engagements: Seven Years' War; Russo-Swedish War (1788–1790); Finnish War; Swedish–Norwegian War

Commanders
- Commander: See list: Augustin Ehrensvärd (1756–1766) Christopher Falkengréen (1767–1770) Augustin Ehrensvärd (1770–1772) Henrik af Trolle (1772–1784) Carl Ehrensvärd (1784–1790) Johan Lagerbjelke (1790–1811) Victor von Stedingk (1812–1823)

Insignia
- Blue Ensign (1761–1813)

The archipelago fleet (Swedish: skärgårdsflottan), officially the "fleet of the army" (Swedish: arméns flotta), was a maritime branch of the Swedish Armed Forces which existed between 1756 and 1823. Its purpose was to protect the coasts of Sweden, which was surrounded by a natural barrier of archipelagoes (or skerries). Throughout its existence, the fleet was a largely independent arm of the Swedish Army, separate from the Swedish Navy, with the exception of a few years in the late 1760s. In a number of respects, it was a precursor of the Swedish Coastal Artillery and its coastal fleet.

The fleet's vessels consisted of traditional Mediterranean-style galleys, prams, gunboats and specially designed broadside-armed "archipelago frigates". All types had the ability to operate under oars and a small draft, enabling them to navigate the shallow and often treacherous inshore waters. The archipelago fleet was active in several wars from 1757 to 1814, such as the Seven Years' War, the Russo-Swedish War of 1788–1790, the Finnish War and the brief Swedish–Norwegian War of 1814.

== History ==
The Russian capture of Nöteborg and Nyen early in the Great Northern War allowed the Russians to access to the Baltic Sea, which had largely been under Swedish control before the war. Since Russian naval units were, at the time, based on coastal squadrons, the Swedes were prompted to start construction of their own small coastal squadrons. However, the small Swedish squadron, which had been hastily created during the war, was overwhelmed by the Russian galley fleet at the battle of Gangut in 1714, as the Russian fleet enjoyed tenfold superiority over the Swedish fleet.

After the Treaty of Nystad in 1721, the Swedish high command realized the need of a fast and agile marine unit that could maneuver in littoral waters. A squadron based in Stockholm was the first to be created. However, the Russo-Swedish War of 1741–1743 demonstrated that the unit was too small to defeat the Russian forces. An official fleet of the army was planned, and the ships would be modeled after Mediterranean galleys and xebecs (a sailing ship hybrid with oar propulsion). These were fast and dangerous ships that were used by the Barbary pirates off the coast of North Africa. The Swedish galleys were redesigned, and made smaller.

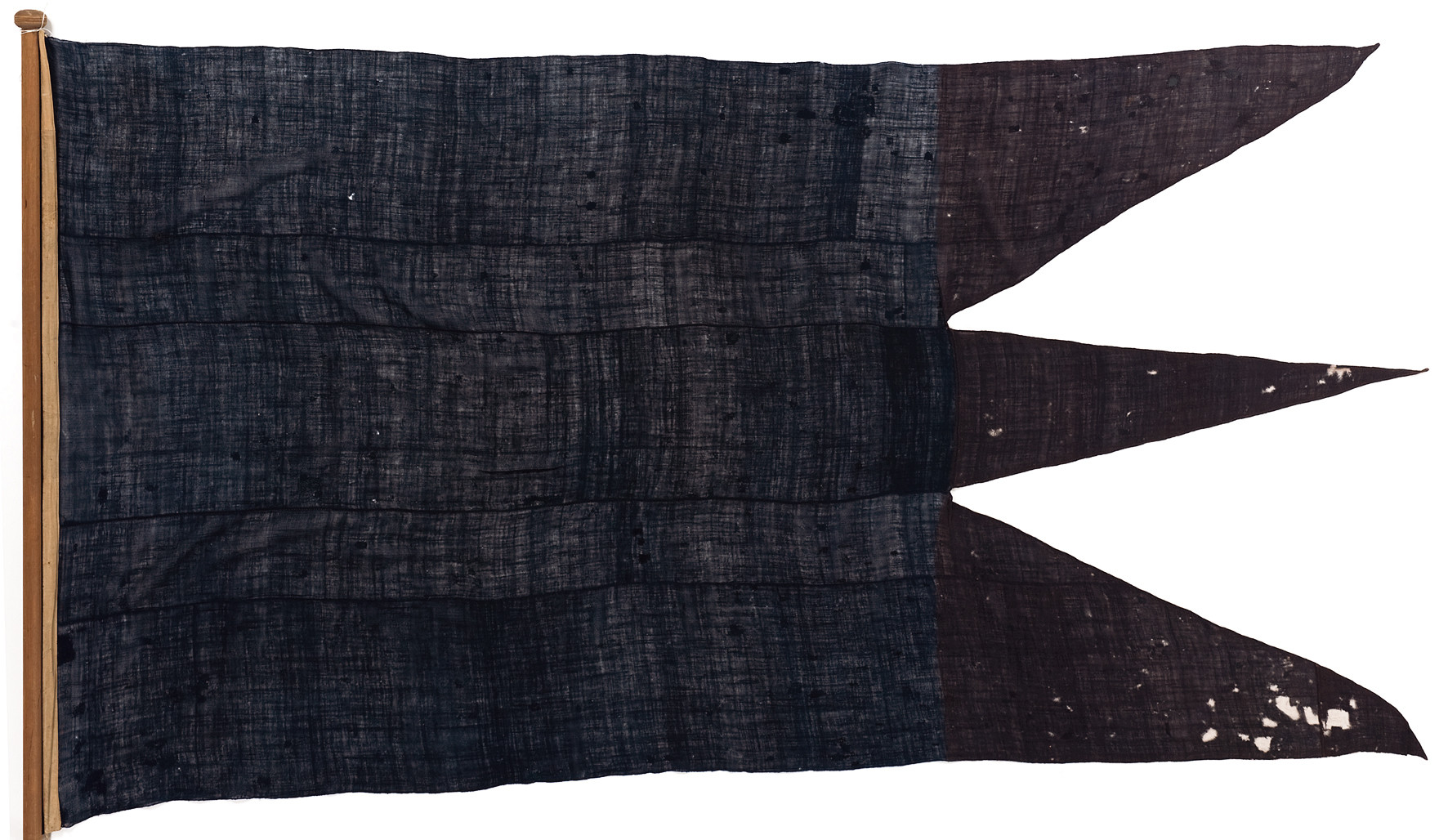
An original three-tailed ensign of the archipelago fleet from the collections of the Maritime Museum in Stockholm

The archipelago fleet was not under the command of the Royal Swedish Navy (örlogsflottan) and the admiralty board based in Karlskrona; instead, it was placed under the command of the army on 18 October 1756. In 1756, the archipelago fleet consisted of two units: a Stockholm squadron and a Finnish squadron. General Augustin Ehrensvärd was appointed commander of the fleet.

The fleet had some initial successes. During the Seven Years' War, the new galleys, supported by heavy gun prams, were victorious against Prussia at the battle of Frisches Haff, but the short range of the galleys limited their use. It was only with a deliberate boarding action that the battle was won. The ship designer Fredrik Henrik Chapman had joined the navy in 1757, and was charged with creating new ship types that would better fulfill the needs of the archipelago fleet. In 1760, the archipelago fleet was granted independent status, and renamed the "fleet of the army" or "the united archipelago fleets", by suggestion of Ehrensvärd.

A Royal warrant in August 1761 stipulated that an all blue triple-tailed flag was to be used by the archipelago fleet. The Commander of the fleet also had the right to order the use of the ordinary war ensign instead of the blue ensign when it was deemed "appropriate". The blue flag was used until 1813.

In 1766, the ruling Caps faction of the Swedish parliament ordered that the archipelago fleet be merged with the navy. However, the ruling was partially reversed when the rival Hats faction regained control in 1770. The Finnish squadron was returned to the army, while the Stockholm squadron remained under the command of the navy; however, it was renamed the "galley fleet" (galärflottan). On 14 November of the same year, both units were once again merged into one unit, and were renamed the arméns flotta ("the "fleet of the army") in 1777.

The main headquarters of the archipelago fleet were located at Stockholm and Sveaborg, with smaller stations established in other places over time. The Bohus squadron was formed in Gothenburg in 1789, and an additional Finnish squadron was created in Åbo (Turku) in 1793. A Pomeranian squadron was created in Stralsund, and was moved to Landskrona in 1807. There were also some smaller units in Malmö, Kristina and Varkaus.

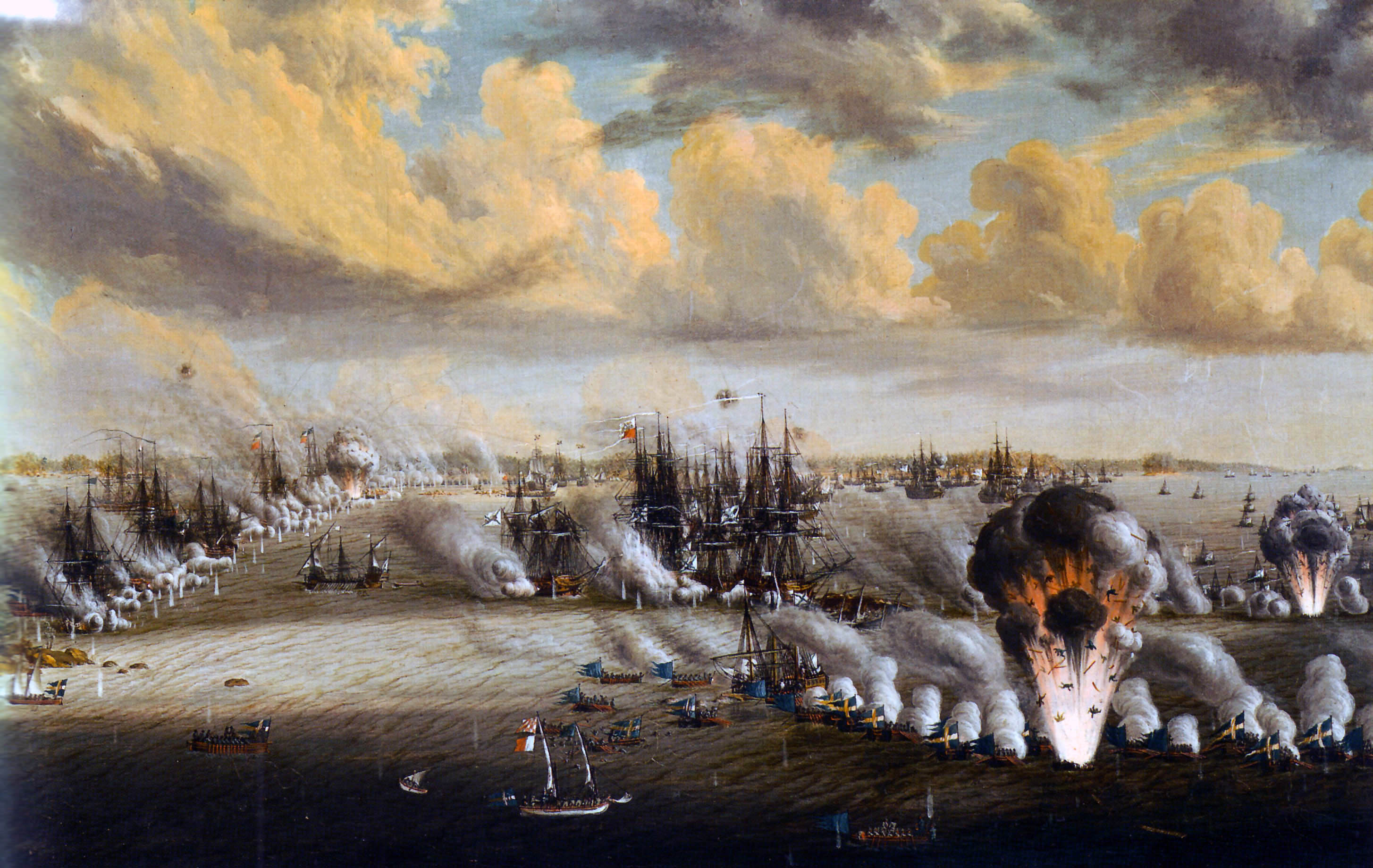
The battle of Svensksund in July 1790, one of Sweden's most decisive naval victories. Contemporary painting by Johan Tietrich Schoultz.

During the Russo-Swedish War of 1788-1790, the High Seas Fleet was roughly equal in quality and often superior in the number and size of its ships in comparison to the Russian navy. The Swedish navy struggled throughout the war, failing to achieve the major victory required to leave the Russian capital of Saint Petersburg open to invasion; it also sustained considerable losses. At best, it only achieved tactical draws. On the other hand, the archipelago fleet was far more successful, although it suffered a few initial setbacks, including a tactical defeat against its Russian equivalent at Svensksund in August 1789; however, it achieved a resounding victory against the Russian inshore fleet at the second battle of Svensksund on 9 July 1790. The war against Russia showed that the heavy archipelago frigates lacked the mobility required for inshore operations, while smaller rowed craft were far more efficient.

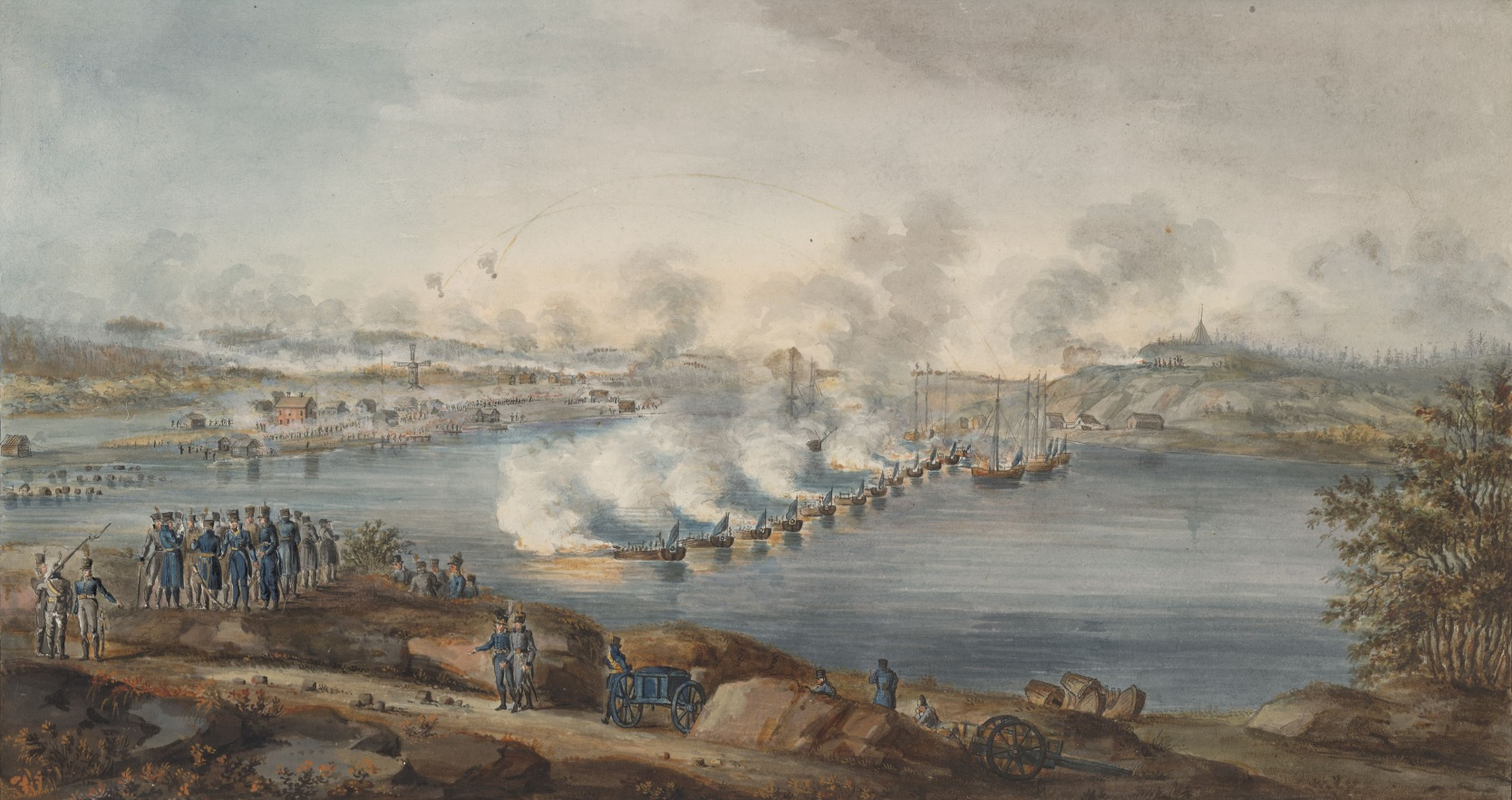
The battle of Ratan near Umeå, the final engagement of the Finnish War, where the archipelago fleet fought to hold off invading Russian land forces.

The archipelago fleet was heavily involved in the Finnish War of 1808–09 against Russia, but with less success. Russia attacked the Swedish forces in Finland during the winter, when ice prevented naval forces from intervening. Sveaborg, the cornerstone of the defense of Finland, was also lost at an early stage, along with most of the ships of the Finnish squadron. Ships were also lost when the archipelago fleet, which had been docked for the winter at Åbo, was burned by the Swedes to prevent their capture. The loss of the bulk of the archipelago fleet was catastrophic, and prevented the Swedes from regaining their advantage in the Finnish Archipelago, despite heavy fighting between Swedish and Russian coastal units during 1808. The war ended with a harsh peace treaty, in which Sweden permanently lost all of Finland to Russia.

During the latter phases of the Napoleonic Wars, Sweden was allied with Great Britain against Napoleon, and participated in battles in continental Europe in 1813. In 1814, the archipelago fleet was deployed in a short war against Norway to conquer strategic fortresses and strong points, with the goal of forcing Norway into a union with Sweden (at the expense of the arch-enemy Denmark). This was also the last war Sweden actively participated in.

In 1823, the archipelago fleet was once again merged with the high-seas navy, and had a minor renaissance between 1866 and 1873 as part of the coastal artillery.

== Vessels ==
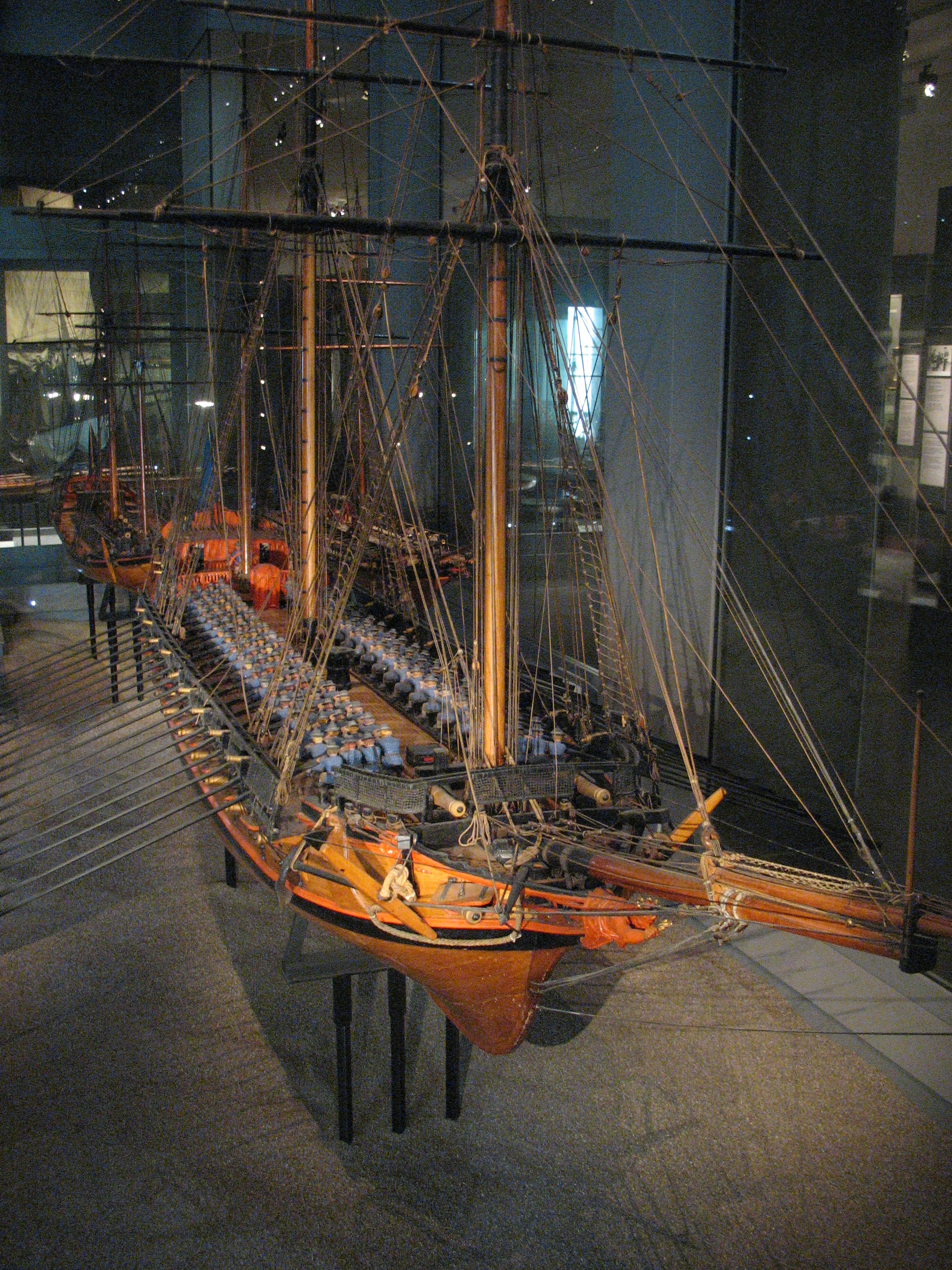
Contemporary model of the turuma Lodbrok (built in 1771) at the Maritime Museum in Stockholm. The turuma were the core of the archipelago fleet during the war of 1788–1790 and were the largest vessels in the inshore squadrons.

In the 1750s and 1760s the naval architect Fredrik Chapman designed several new ship types to bolster the firepower of the new Swedish military arm and to provide it with better naval defense and greater fire support capabilities during amphibious operations. The result was four new vessel types that combined the maneuverability of oar-powered galleys with the superior sail plans and decent living conditions of sailing ships: the udema, pojama, turuma and hemmema, named after the Finnish regions of Uusimaa (Uudenmaan in genitive form), Pohjanmaa, Turunmaa and Hämeenmaa (Tavastia). All four have been referred to as skärgårdsfregatter, "archipelago frigates", in Swedish and English historical literature, though the smaller udema and pojama have also been described as "archipelago corvettes". The first new ship, Norden, a turuma, was launched in Stralsund in 1761.

The archipelago fleet also employed traditional galleys (e.g. the Carls Crona), and several types of prams and sloops. After the war of 1788–1790, it consisted mostly of smaller vessels, primarily specially designed yawls and sloops that carried only one or two heavy guns, usually 24-pounders.

In 1790, the fleet consisted of 285 armed vessels. These were crewed by 320 officers, 675 NCOs, and about 6,000 sailors. Additionally, the vessels carried 593 army officers who commanded about 17,000 NCOs and soldiers.

=== Gun sloop ===
A gun sloop (kanonslup) had two collapsible masts and carried chase guns in both bow and stern. They were 15 to 19 meters in length and 3.5–4 meters in width while having draft of slightly less than one meter. The sloops had 10 to 12 oar pairs with two men on each oar and two collapsible sloop-rigged masts. Armament consisted of a 12- or 24-pound gun at both bow and stern, though some of the first gun sloops carried only a single gun in the bow, and a single 3-pounder swivel gun on each side. Some sloops carried carriages to allow their guns to be used as a shore battery. When not in combat, the guns were secured at the bottom of the vessel. Crew complement was from 50 to 64 men. Later slightly larger, decked versions of gun sloops were built that were called gun schooners (sv. kanonskonert).

=== Gun yawl ===
A gun yawl (kanonjolle) also had two collapsible masts and was armed with a stern chaser. The heavy gun and the small size of the vessel required that the design have a distinct tail for stability. Designed along same principles as the slightly larger gun sloops, the yawls were roughly 11 to 15.3 meters in length while having draft of only 0.75 meters. They had 5–10 oar pairs with one man at each oar, and they were equipped with two collapsible masts. Armament consisted of single 18- to 24-pound gun at stern. Their advantage was their shallow draft and their low crew complements (only 24 men or so).

=== Gun longboat ===
The gun longboat (kanonbarkass) was equipped with two schooner-rigged masts. Only roughly 13 meters in length the longboats were equipped with eight oar pairs with single 12 or 24-pounder cannon in the bow and total of 16 lighter 3-pounder swivel guns mounted along the sides.

=== Mortar longboat ===
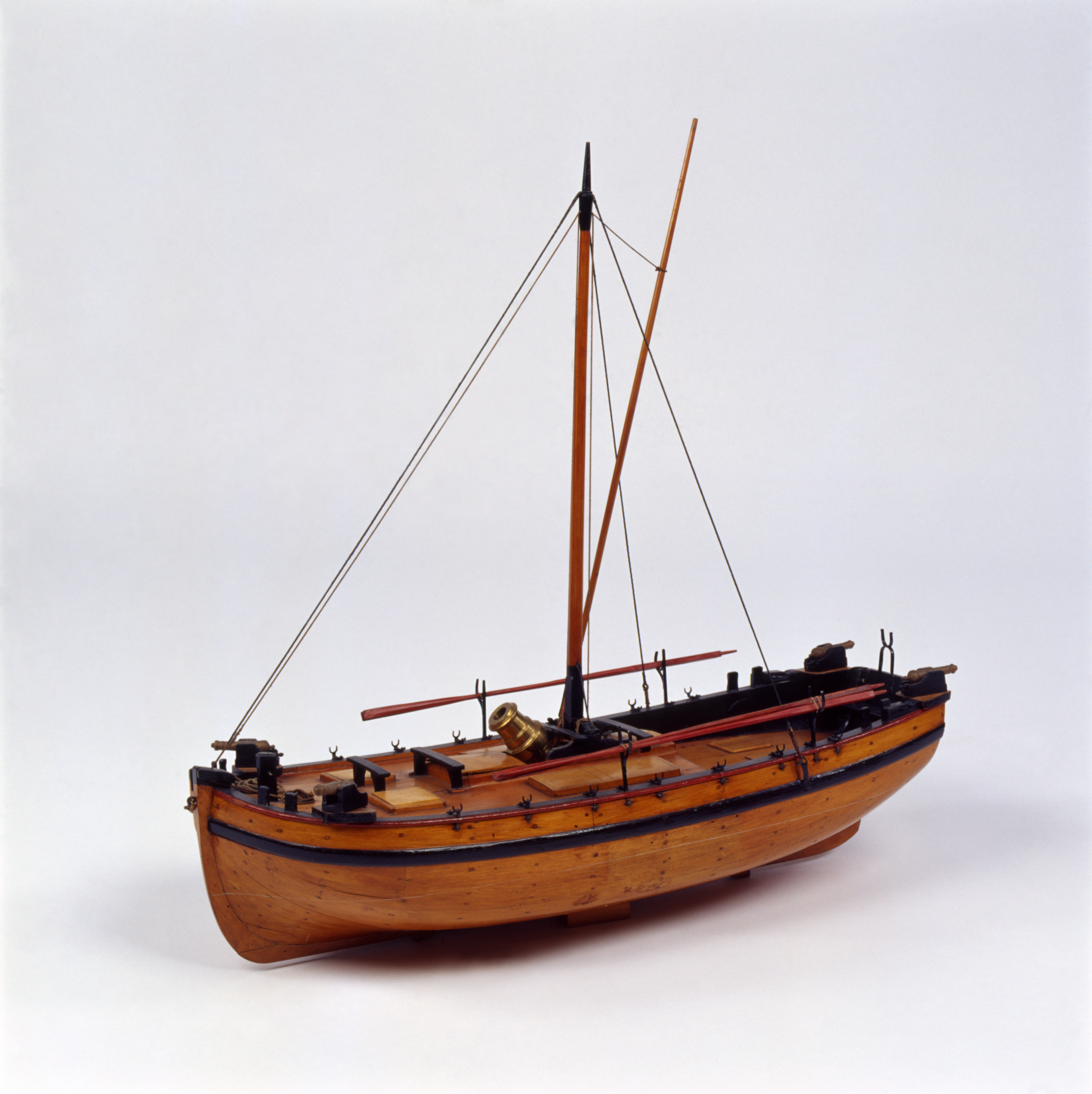
Contemporary model of a mortar longboat from the collections of the Maritime Museum in Stockholm

The mortar longboat (mörsarbarkass) was equipped with two schooner-rigged masts and armed with a mortar. Related to bomb ketches, mortar longboats were designed to operate in shallow waters. The vessels were usually only 10 meters long and had seven oar pairs. Each mortar longboat was armed with single 40-pounder mortar at midships and total of four 3-pounder swivel guns along its sides.

=== Gun pram ===
Gun prams (skottpråm) were intended for broadside engagements in shallow waters. They were equipped with three masts and seven pairs of oars placed between the gun ports. The prams were built in different sizes but the most common was roughly 40 m long and 10 m wide with a draft of less than 3 meters. The armament consisted of up to twenty-four 12-pounder and sixteen 3-pounder swivel guns. Crew complement was around 250 men.

== Commanders ==
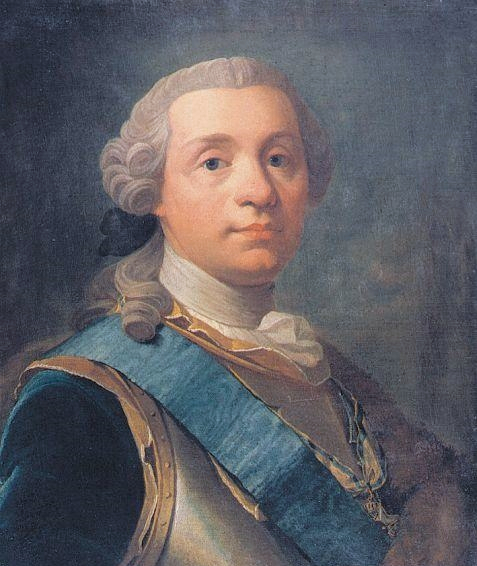
Augustin Ehrensvärd, commander of the archipelago fleet 1770–1772

- Augustin Ehrensvärd (1756–1766)
- Christopher Falkengréen (1767–1770)
- Augustin Ehrensvärd (1770–1772)
- Henrik af Trolle (1772–1784)
- Carl August Ehrensvärd (1784–1790)
- Johan Gustaf Lagerbjelke (1790–1811)
- Victor von Stedingk (1812–1823)
