= HSwMS Carlscrona (1749) =

Swedish galley

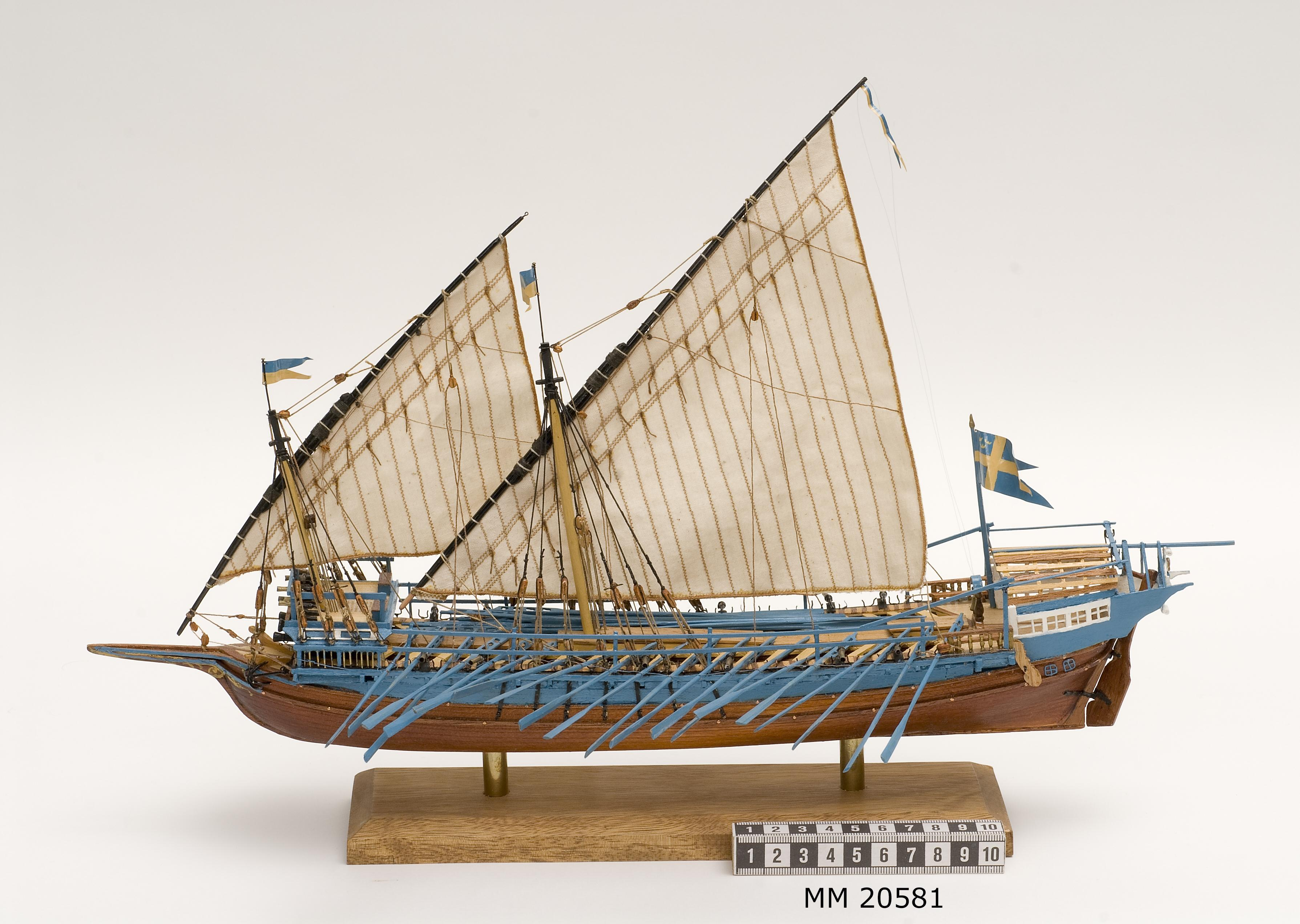
- Model of the galley Carlscrona in Marinmuseum, Karlskrona

History

Sweden
- Namesake: Karlskrona, Sweden
- Builder: Karlskrona Naval Shipyard
- Launched: 1749
- Fate: Participated in the Battle of Stettiner Haff (1759); further fate unknown

General characteristics
- Length: 42.1 m (138 ft 1 in)
- Beam: 5.9 m (19 ft 4 in)
- Draft: 2.1 m (6 ft 11 in)
- Propulsion: 22 pairs of oars
- Complement: 310
- Armament: 1 × 24-pounder cannon; 2 × 6-pounder cannons
- Notes: Galley constructed under the supervision of shipbuilder Gilbert Sheldon for the Archipelago fleet

Carlscrona was a Swedish galley built in 1749 for the Swedish Archipelago fleet at the Karlskrona Naval Shipyard under the direction of shipbuilder Gilbert Sheldon. The vessel was armed with six cannons and carried a crew of 310 men.

== Naming ==
In surviving documents, the name of this galley is spelled in a few different ways, including Carlscrona, Carls Crona and Carls Chrona. There have been many Swedish ships called variations of the name Karlskrona. At least 6 ships with similar names have been built at the Karlskrona Naval Shipyard.

== History ==
The Carlscrona was built in 1749, and was one of the last galley ships ever built in Sweden, as they were not produced after 1749. Ships of this type were considered too fragile and man-power intensive, as the soldiers aboard them were also required as rowers.

Between 1749 and 1757 the ship was stationed in Karlskrona and was primarily used for troop transport to Pomerania. From 1758 to 1759 it was stationed in Stralsund (in modern-day Germany but, at the time, the capital of Swedish Pomerania). The ship was damaged fighting against the Prussians during the Battle of Stettiner Haff in 1759, was later moved to Stockholm in 1768 and decommissioned in 1780.

The coat of arms from the Carlscrona was preserved after its decommissioning, and is displayed in the model hall building at the Karlskrona naval base, along with a 1749 model of the ship, designed by galley builder John Acrell, which is thought to have been used during the construction of the galley.
