= Henrik af Trolle =

Swedish admiral (1730–1784)

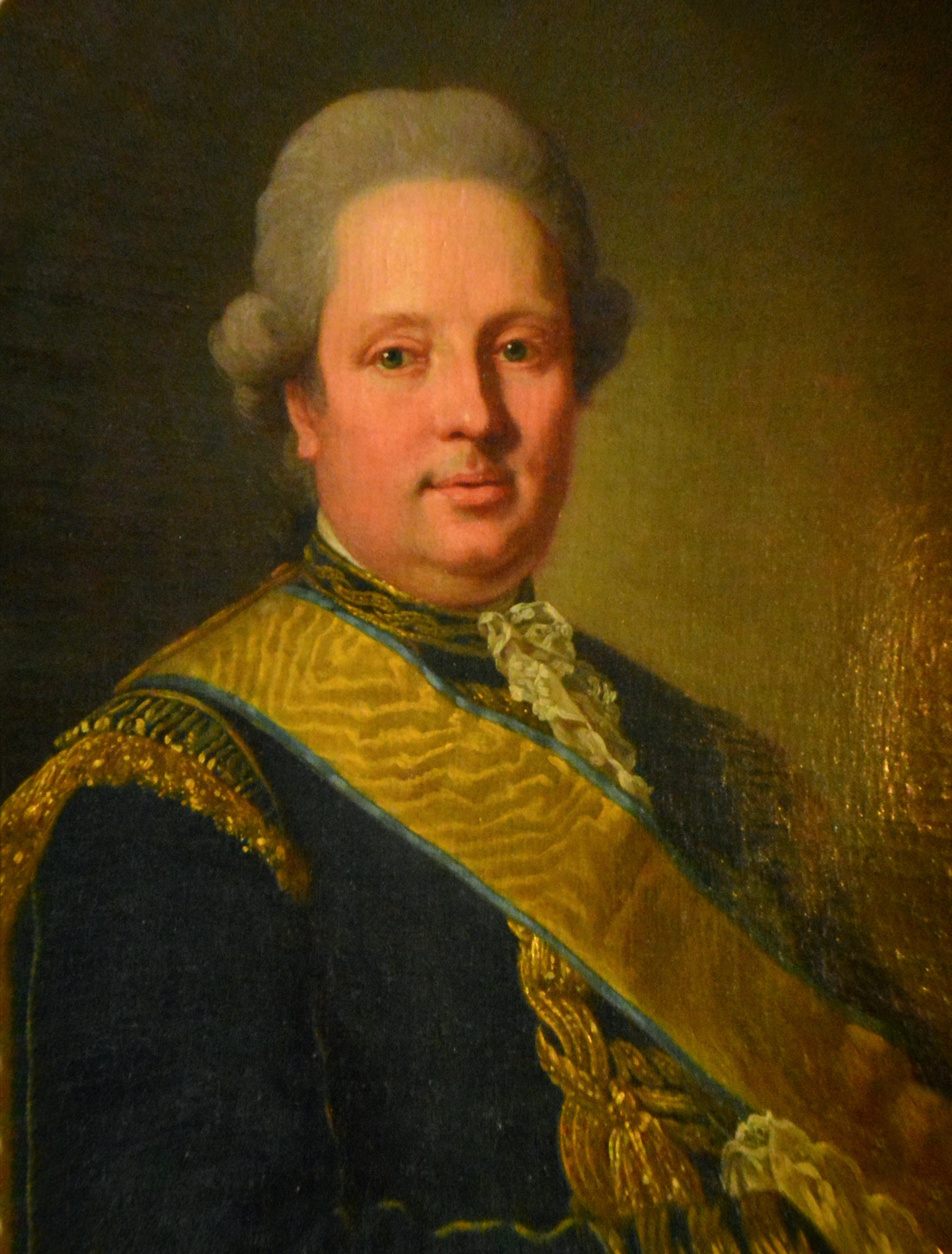
- Portrait by Per Krafft the Elder.
- Born: 24 November 1730; Sweden
- Died: 12 March 1784 (aged 53); Stockholm, Sweden
- Military career
- Allegiance: Sweden
- Branch: Swedish Navy
- Service years: 1740–1784
- Rank: General Admiral
- Conflicts: Pomeranian War: Battle of Frisches Haff

Henrik af Trolle (24 November 1730 – 12 March 1784) was a Swedish naval officer and commander of the Swedish Archipelago fleet. He was ennobled in 1772. He is considered to be one of the foremost administrators and developers of the Swedish Navy throughout the ages (together with Claes Larsson Fleming and Hans Wachtmeister).

== History ==
Henrik Trolle was born in 1730 to the Danish admiral Georg Herman von Trolle, who had entered Swedish service, and Anna Margareta Grill. At age ten his father sent him to serve in the navy, where he spent the next thirteen years, advancing to the rank of second mate. During one adventurous journey outside South America, Trolle's ship encountered four Spanish vessels and fought a four-hour-long battle, which ended with the entire Swedish crew being captured and imprisoned. Trolle was released after four months.

Upon his return to Sweden one year later (1754) he was promoted to the rank of chief mate and rose to lieutenant captain in 1758. He fought in the Seven Years' War at the siege of Peenemünde and at a battle that took place at the Prussian sconce Anklamer-Fehr. There he served as a captain on Carlskrona one of the larger galleys and managed to chase away two Prussian galleys.

In 1759 he organized the transport of the Swedish army to Rügen and served as an aide-de-camp to Count Axel von Fersen who was commander of the Swedish army. The same year he also participated in the victorious battle at Frisches Haff. He was given command of the naval and army units that guarded the waters around the islands of Usedom and Wollin. He rose quickly through the ranks and became a major in 1762, the final year of Sweden's involvement in the Seven Years' War.

In 1766, after years that had seen the Swedish Navy being reduced, he travelled on his own expense to Brest, Flanders and Amsterdam, where he observed shipbuilding and fortress construction techniques. In 1769 he married Carolina Carleson, daughter of politician Edvard Carleson.

In 1770, he was given a high position in the Swedish Archipelago fleet, at the time officially referred to as the "fleet of the army" (arméns flotta), a branch of the military specializing in coastal warfare and amphibious operations. He became the right-hand man of its commander, Augustin Ehrensvärd, and together they supervised the expansion, administration and training of the fleet. As a reward for his support in the royal revolution of king Gustav III in 1772, he was given command of the Archipelago fleet and was ennobled, thus being allowed to attach the prefix "af" to his family name. During the following years, Trolle came into conflict with traditionalist supporters of the blue water navy who were against the very existence of a naval unit under army command. Trolle and the naval architect Fredrik Henrik af Chapman had both come to the conclusion that small, fast and maneuverable vessels with 60-70 guns were of more use than big, slow, depth-craving ships with 100 guns. With the help of powerful allies and support from the court he managed to aide af Chapman become chief naval architect, further developing and renewing the army fleet according to their visions.

While remaining an officer in the Archipelago fleet he then went on to command the Nyland Regiment and the Swedish squadron of the Archipelago fleet. In June 1780 he was appointed the rank of General Admiral. He died in Stockholm on 12 March 1784.
