= Sankt Veit in der Südsteiermark =

- Municipality
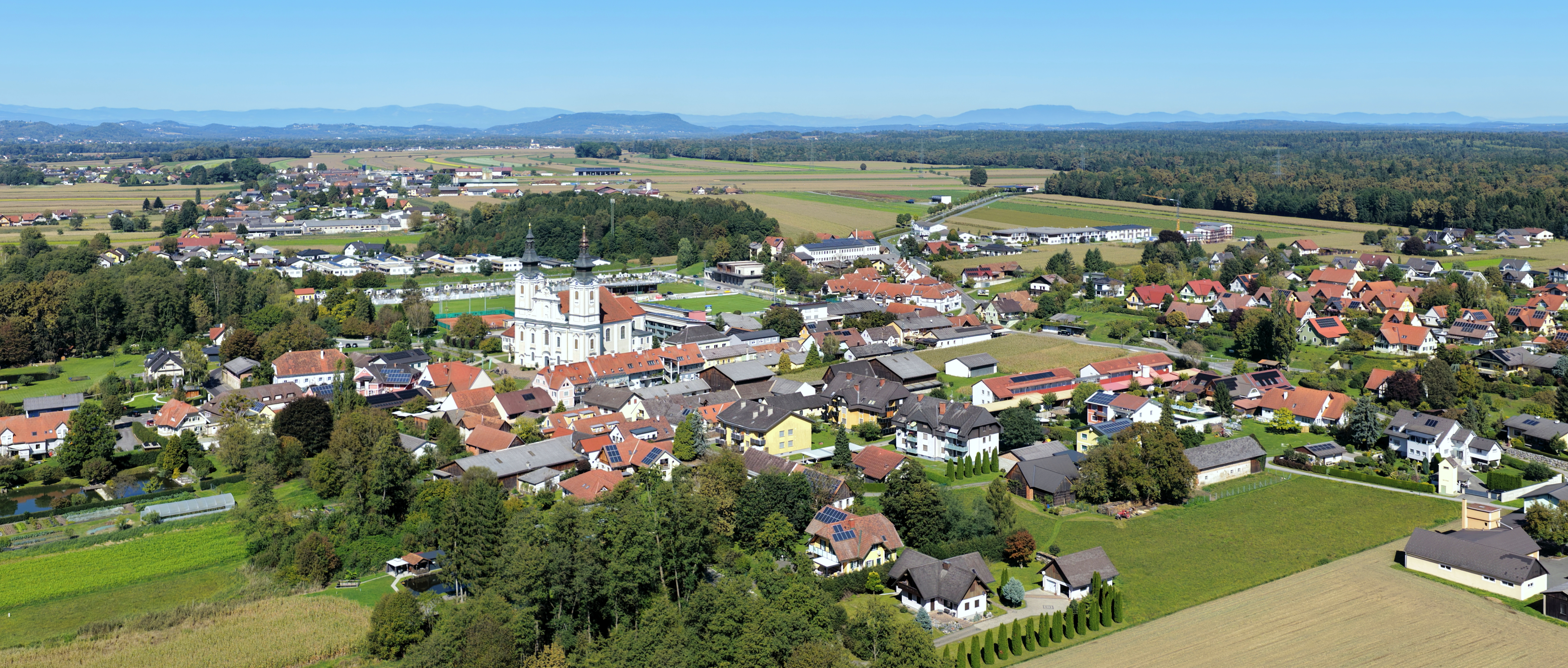
- South-southeast view of St. Veit am Vogau

- Coat of arms

- Location within Austria
- Coordinates: 46°44′52″N 15°37′36″E
- Country: Austria
- State: Styria
- District: Leibnitz

Government
  - Mayor: Manfred Tatzl (ÖVP)

Area
  - Total: 68.42 km^{2} (26.42 sq mi)
- Elevation: 260 m (850 ft)

Population (2018-01-01)
  - Total: 4,062
  - Density: 59.37/km^{2} (153.8/sq mi)
- Time zone: UTC+1 (CET)
  - Summer (DST): UTC+2 (CEST)
- Postal code: 8423, 8421, 8422, 8435, 8481
- Area code: 03453
- Website: www.st-veit-suedsteiermark.gv.at

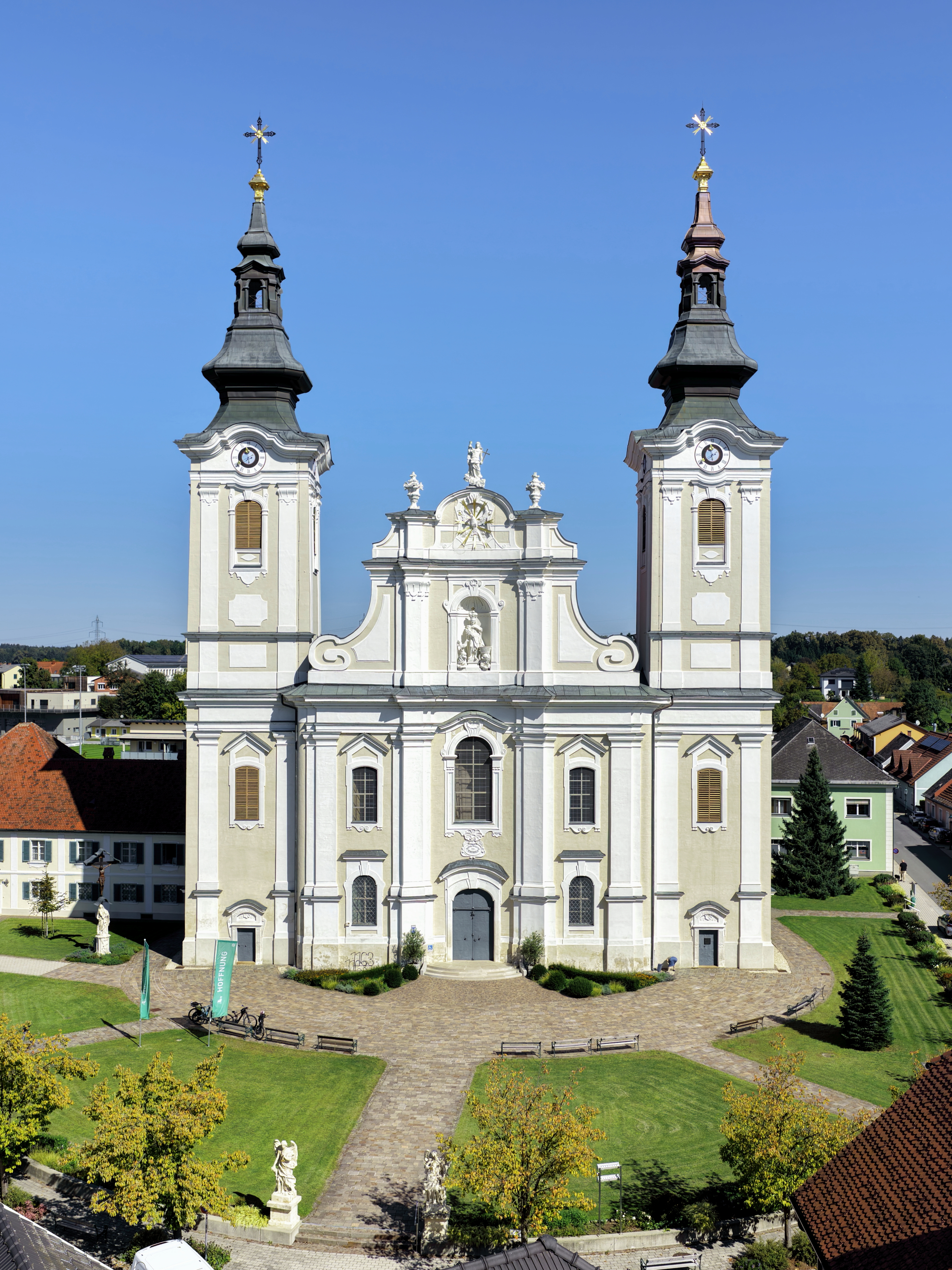
The namesake Catholic Pfarrkirche church, Hl. Veit.

Sankt Veit in der Südsteiermark (Austrian German: [saŋkt ˈfaɪt ɪn deːɐ̯ ˈsyːdˌʃtaɪɐmark]) is a municipality since 2015 in the Leibnitz District of Styria, Austria. The population was 4,069 residents (as of 1 January 2016).

The municipality, Sankt Veit in der Südsteiermark, was created as part of the Styria municipal structural reform, at the end of 2014, by merging the former towns Sankt Veit am Vogau and Sankt Nikolai ob Draßling, both in the political district Leibnitz, plus the town Weinburg am Saßbach in the political Südoststeiermark District.

The borders of the Südoststeiermark District and Leibnitz District were shifted, so that the new municipality would lie completely within Leibnitz District.

The former municipality Weinburg am Saßbach was until the end of 2012 in Radkersburg District and had the Kfz-code "RA". From the middle of 2013 until the end of 2014, the code had abbreviation "SO"; in 2015 it was set as "LB".

== Geography ==
=== Municipality arrangement ===
The municipality territory includes the following 11 Katastralgemeinden and 16 sections (populations as of 1 January 2015):

Katastralgemeinden

- Hütt (592.49 ha or 1,464.1 acres)
- Labuttendorf (478.95 ha or 1,183.5 acres)
- Lind (342.25 ha or 845.7 acres)
- Lipsch (333.30 ha or 823.6 acres)
- Neutersdorf (353.21 ha or 872.8 acres)
- Perbersdorf bei St. Veit (413.10 ha or 1,020.8 acres)
- Pichla (698.92 ha or 1,727.1 acres)
- St. Nikolai ob Draßling (1,174.97 ha or 2,903.4 acres)
- St. Veit am Vogau (1,015.12 ha or 2,508.4 acres)
- Siebing (525.90 ha or 1,299.5 acres)
- Weinburg (936.87 ha or 2,315.1 acres)

Ortschaften

- Hütt (185)
- Labuttendorf (173)
- Leitersdorf (135)
- Lind bei St. Veit am Vogau (220)
- Lipsch (182)
- Marchtring (19)
- Neutersdorf (92)
- Perbersdorf bei Sankt Veit (146)
- Pichla bei Mureck (156)
- Priebing (101)
- Rabenhof (149)
- Sankt Nikolai ob Draßling (771)
- Sankt Veit am Vogau (598)
- Siebing (272)
- Wagendorf (515)
- Weinburg am Saßbach (363)

=== Neighboring municipalities ===
The municipality is bordered by seven neighboring towns, four were in Südoststeiermark District (SO).

== Demographics ==
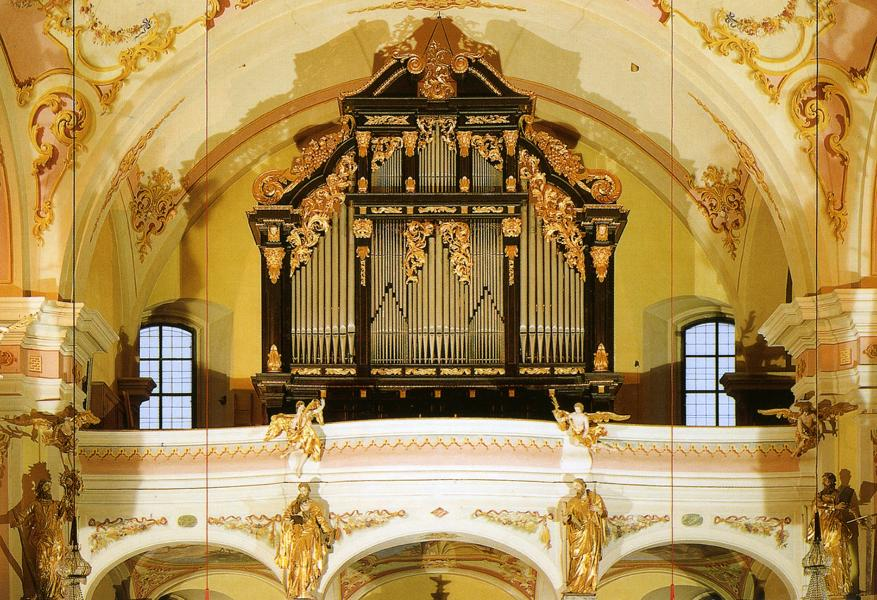
Egedacher-Orgel der Veitskirche

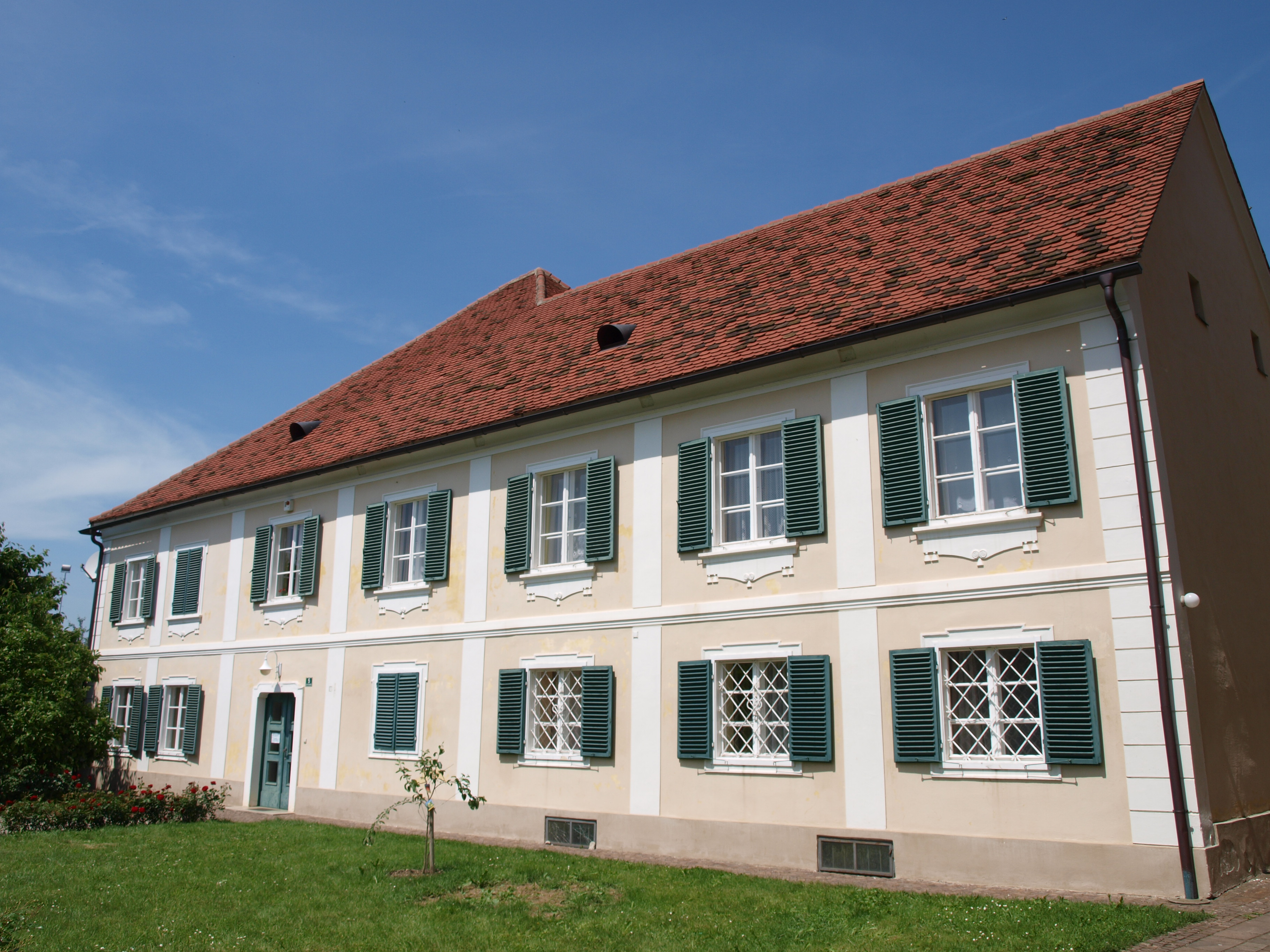
Pfarrhof in St. Veit am Vogau

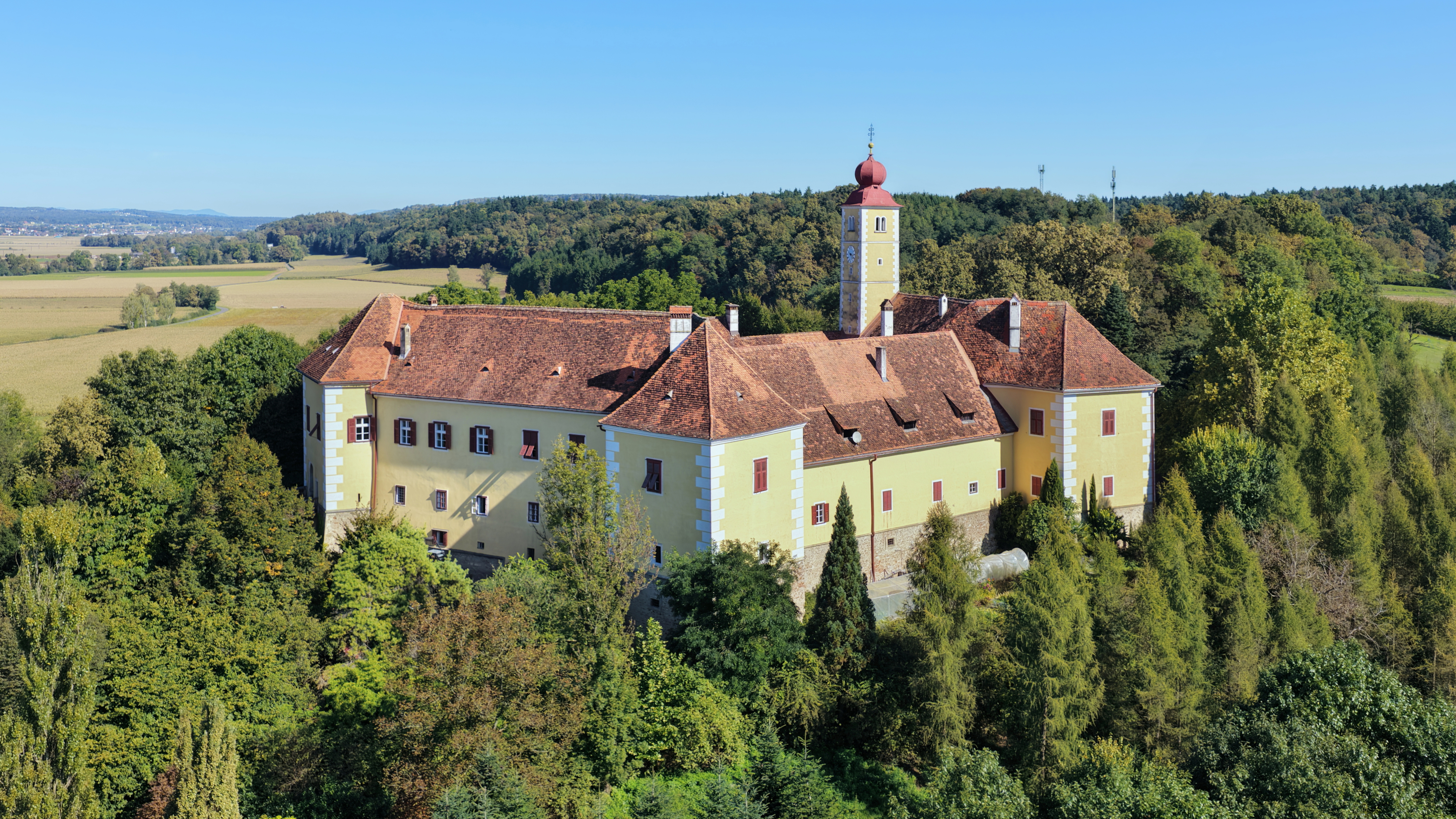
Schloss Weinburg am Saßbach

== Politics ==
=== Mayor ===
Manfred Tatzl (ÖVP) was elected mayor of the newly formed municipality on 20 April 2015, in the inaugural meeting of the Municipal Council. Tatzl was already, at the end of 2014, the mayor of the former municipality of St. Veit am Vogau and led from January 1, 2015, the transactions of the merged municipality as government commissioner.

Josef Pratter, the nearly 25-year mayor of St. Nikolai ob Draßling, was and the former mayor of the municipality of Weinburg am Saßbach, Susanne Lucchesi-Palli, came to the election.

With the results from April 30, 2015, Manfred Tatzl traveled by his council mandate, because he wants to conduct the business of the merged municipality as a "People's Mayor". [7]

The town council also includes the first deputy mayor Gerhard Rohrer, the second Deputy Mayor Harald Schögler, the municipality treasurer Georg Pock and board member Rudolf Reinprecht.

=== Municipality council ===
The town council has 21 members. After the 2015 election, the council had the following results:

- 12 Mandate ÖVP
- 6 Mandate SPÖ
- 3 Mandate FPÖ

The prior elections brought the following results:

Party	2015			2010								
Party	St. Veit in der Südsteiermark			St. Veit am Vogau			St. Nikolai ob Draßling			Weinburg am Saßbach		
Party	Votes	%	Mandate	St.	%	M.	St.	%	M.	St.	%	M.
ÖVP	1458	56	12	767	58	9	588	74	11	497	69	10
SPÖ	736	28	6	518	39	6	107	13	2	not running		
FPÖ	421	16	3	43	3	0	99	12	2	not running		
Einigkeit lohnt sich	not running			not running			not running			228	31	5
Counts	3.444			1.530			927			912		
Percentage	77%			87%			87%			83%		

=== Coat of arms ===
Wappen der Vorgängergemeinden

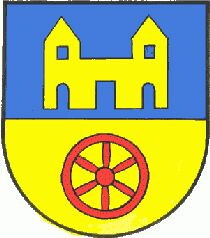
Sankt Veit am Vogau

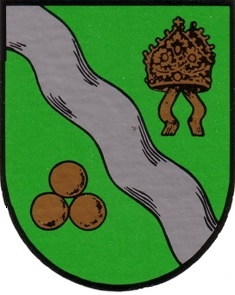
Sankt Nikolai ob Draßling

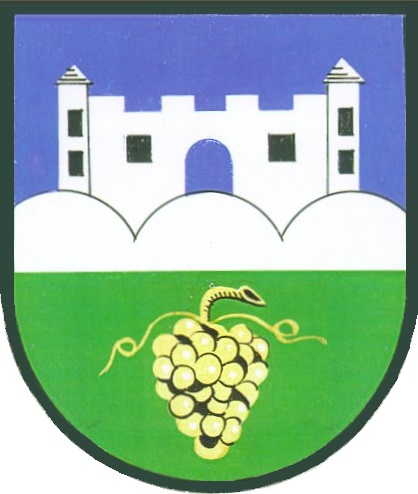
Weinburg am Saßbach

All three predecessors had a town crest. Because of the merger, the crests lost their official validity on January 1, 2015. The authorization of the municipal coat of arms for the joined community took effect on 25 October 2016.
Blazon (crest description):

"Above the silvery shield-foot, over a black, silver-floated wave-beam green three grapes growing from common origin upward and two flat wine leaves, in blue a golden, richly arranged and of window and door fifteenfold black perforated with volute gable and two with Knauf and cross at golden towers; between these, a silver lion's head".
