= Russian frigate Sankt Nikolai =

History

Russian Empire
- Name: Sankt Nikolai
- Fate: Sunk on 9 July 1790

General characteristics
- Class & type: Frigate
- Sail plan: Full-rigged ship

The Russian frigate Sankt Nikolai was sunk in the Baltic Gulf of Finland in the Battle of Svensksund in 1790. She was found in 1948 almost intact in the sea bottom outside the modern city of Kotka. Over 2300 objects have been recovered from her hull by divers.
