= Fort Katarina =

Coordinates: 60.4499°N 26.9375°E

Part of the exterior wall, which is now located in a park.

Fort Katarina, also known as Fort Katariina, is an Imperial Russian fortification located on the island of Kotkansaari, Finland. Fort Katarina is what is called a "dual-purpose" fort, meaning it was meant for both landward and seaward defense.

== History ==
A view from the upper part of Fort Katarina.

Fort Katarina was built in 1791, and was built in two different parts due to elevation differences on the Katariina Peninsula. The fort was equipped with large caliber cannons to dominate the nearby waters, as well as to strike any distant targets on land. Housed within the fort were administrative buildings, officers quarters, and even an orthodox church. During the Crimean War, Fort Katarina was destroyed by Anglo-French naval forces. By the time the City of Kotka was founded in 1879, Fort Katarina was mostly in ruins. Throughout the 20th and early 21st centuries, oil storage tanks were housed in and next to the fort. In 2006, the Finnish National Board of Antiquities reached an agreement with the oil company for them to pay for the damages caused by the oil storage. From 2007 to 2012, restoration was done on Fort Katarina, and today the fort is part of the Katariina Marine Park.
