= Fort Elisabeth (Ruotsinsalmi fortress) =

Coordinates: 60.4456°N 26.9520°E

Varissaari island (smaller island in the front is Pikku-Liisa)

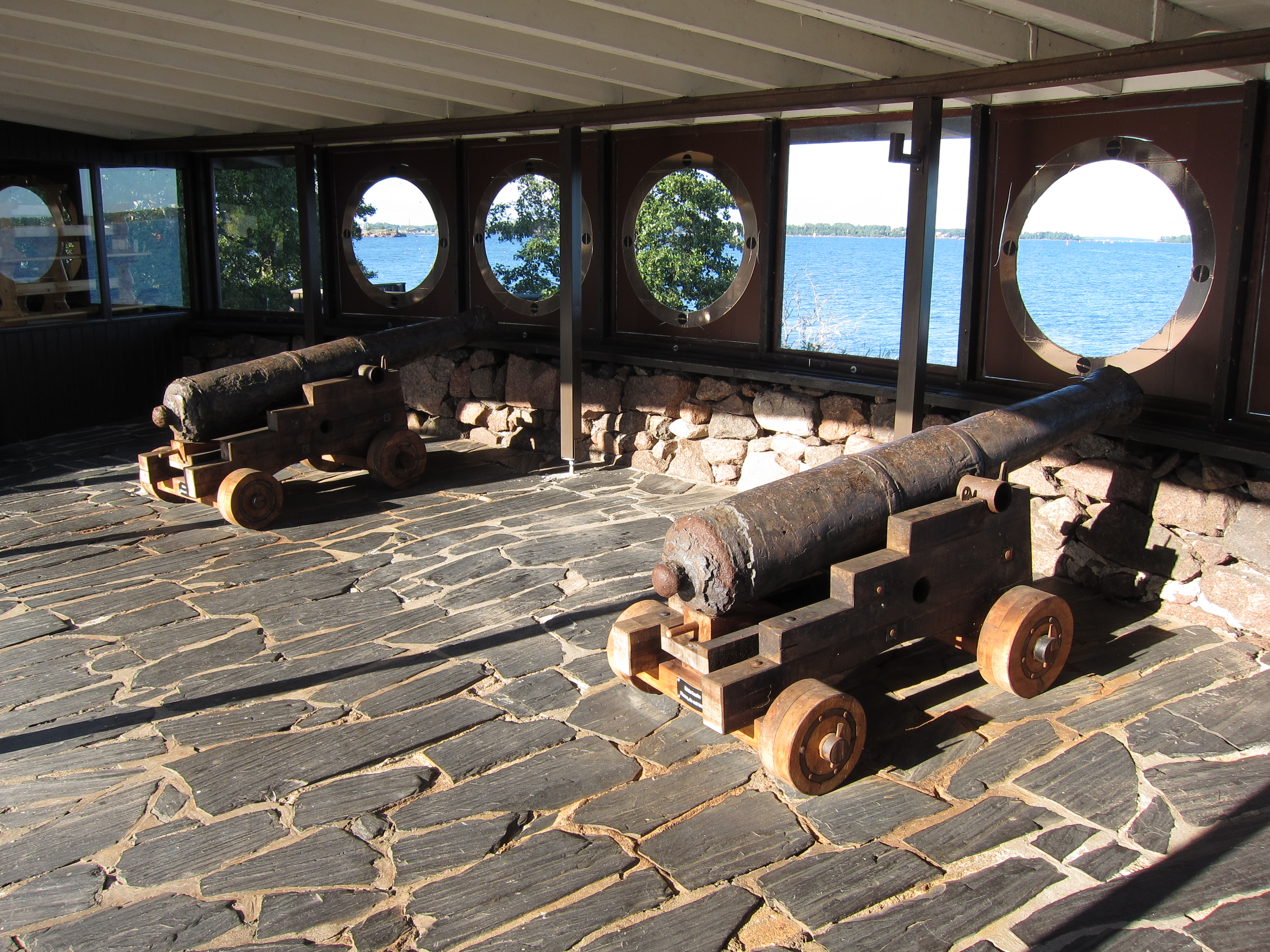
Cannons of Fort Elisabeth

Fort Elisabeth, also known as Fort Elizabeth, was an Imperial Russian fortification located on the island of Varissaari, near Kotka, Finland. Fort Elisabeth was designed to work with the nearby Fort Slava to dominate the nearby sea lanes.

== History ==
Fort Elisabeth was constructed between 1790 and 1796, to block the way to Saint Petersburg, then the Russian capital. The fort was constructed in response to the Russo-Swedish War (1788–1790). Fort Elisabeth gets its name from Princess Elisabeth, the daughter of Peter the Great. The fort was built in a semi-circular elongated shape and followed the coastline. Fort Elisabeth was built in 2 different semi-circular sections. The fort was armed with 44 cannons placed in a double-walled defensive perimeter. In 1855, during the Crimean War, Fort Elisabeth was destroyed by a 14-ship naval detachment commanded by HMS Argonaut. Despite the destruction, you can still see the foundations of the powder magazine, barracks, and warehouse. During World War II, an anti-aircraft battery was stationed in the ruins of Fort Elisabeth. Between 2001 and 2006, part of the fort was repaired and conservatively renovated.
