= Sankt Nikolai ob Draßling =

- Former municipality
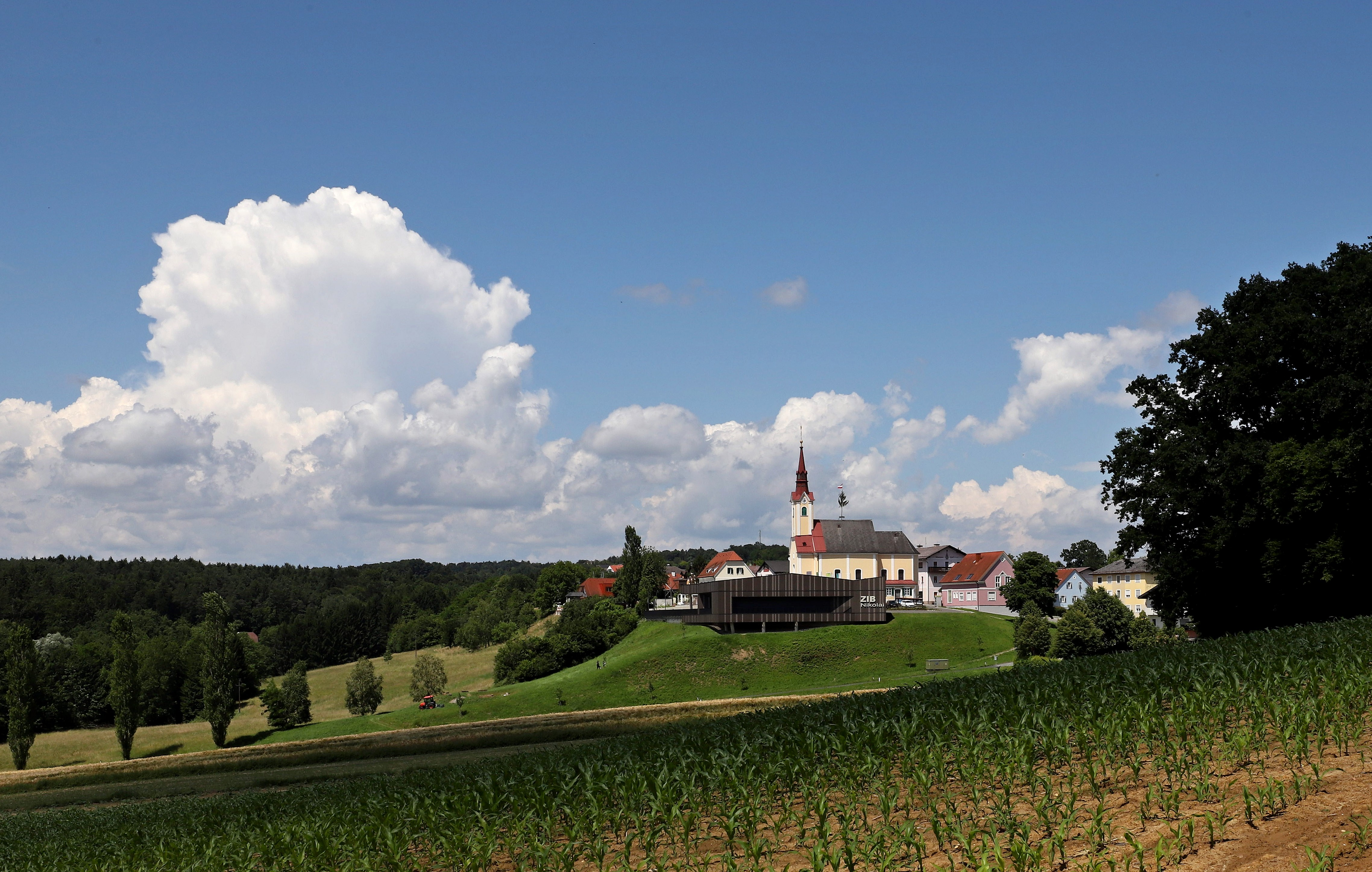
- Church in Sankt Nikolai ob Draßling

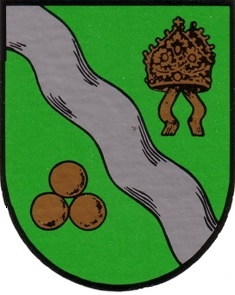
- Coat of arms

- Location within Austria
- Coordinates: 46°46′48″N 15°39′00″E
- Country: Austria
- State: Styria
- District: Leibnitz

Area
  - Total: 17.56 km^{2} (6.78 sq mi)
- Elevation: 333 m (1,093 ft)

Population (1 January 2016)
  - Total: 1,097
  - Density: 62.47/km^{2} (161.8/sq mi)
- Time zone: UTC+1 (CET)
  - Summer (DST): UTC+2 (CEST)
- Postal code: 8422
- Area code: 03184
- Vehicle registration: LB
- Website: www.st-nikolai-drassling.steiermark.at

Sankt Nikolai ob Draßling is a former municipality in the district of Leibnitz in Styria, Austria. Since the 2015 Styria municipal structural reform, it is part of the municipality Sankt Veit in der Südsteiermark.
