= Kesar Ordin =

Russian mathematician and historian

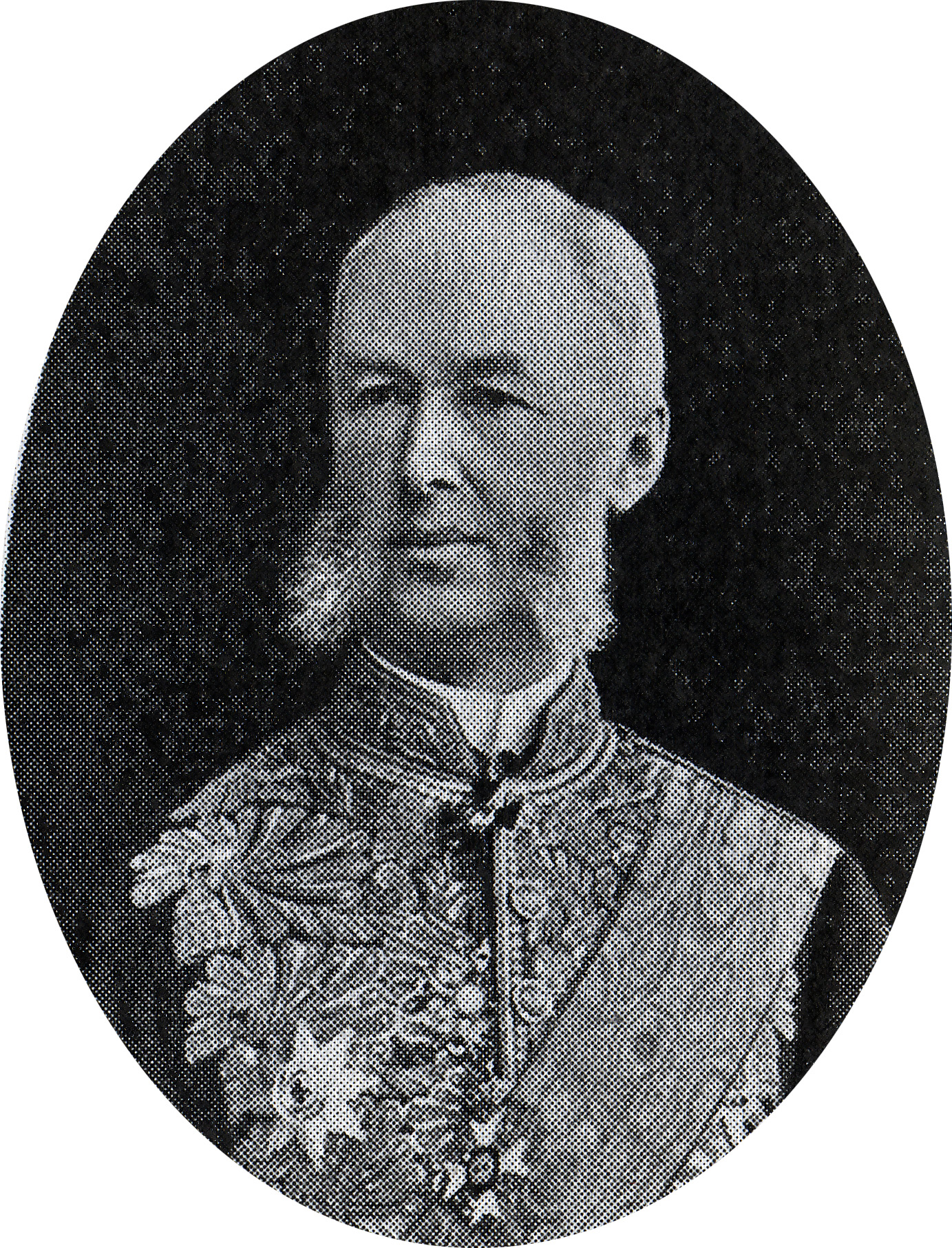
Kesar Ordin

Kesar Filippovich Ordin (1835–1892) was a Russian statesman, amateur historian, and author.

He was a graduate in mathematics of St. Petersburg University and author of a number of articles on Finland, opposing Finnish separatism.

Ordin is perhaps most known for his research in the history of Finland, in particular, for his work in which he contested the claims published by Finnish (also part of Russia at that time) Leo Mechelin about the 1809 Diet of Porvoo.
