= Fort Slava =

Coordinates: 60.4416°N 26.9739°E

Fort Slava today.

Fort Slava was an Imperial Russian fortification located on Kukouri island, near Kotka, Finland. The fort was part of the Ruotsinsalmi sea fortress,' and is the farthest out to sea of all of the fortifications in the sea fortress. Fort Slava was built between 1791-94, and was constructed out of stone and brick.

== History ==
Kukouri, on which Fort Slava is located, was originally a small sandy ridge that barely protruded out of the water. Stone and sand were added to enlarge the island for the fort. The fort was constructed out of brick and stone in a circular shape. The diameter of the fort measures 75 m across. Fort Slava was armed with 44 heavy cannons mounted in embrasures, and had a 360 degree firing radius. Behind every other gun embrasure was accommodation quarters for the crew of Slava. Slava's crew was 242 officers and men in 1854. Russian authorities decided to abandon the fort at the end of 1854, but keep the fort intact.

=== Crimean War ===
On June 15, 1855, during the Crimean War, a detachment of the British Royal Navy landed on the abandoned island and burned all the wooden structures to the ground. Later that year on July 21, a 14-ship detachment led by HMS Argonaut reduced the rest of Fort Slava to ruins by bombarding the fort.

=== Post-Crimean War ===
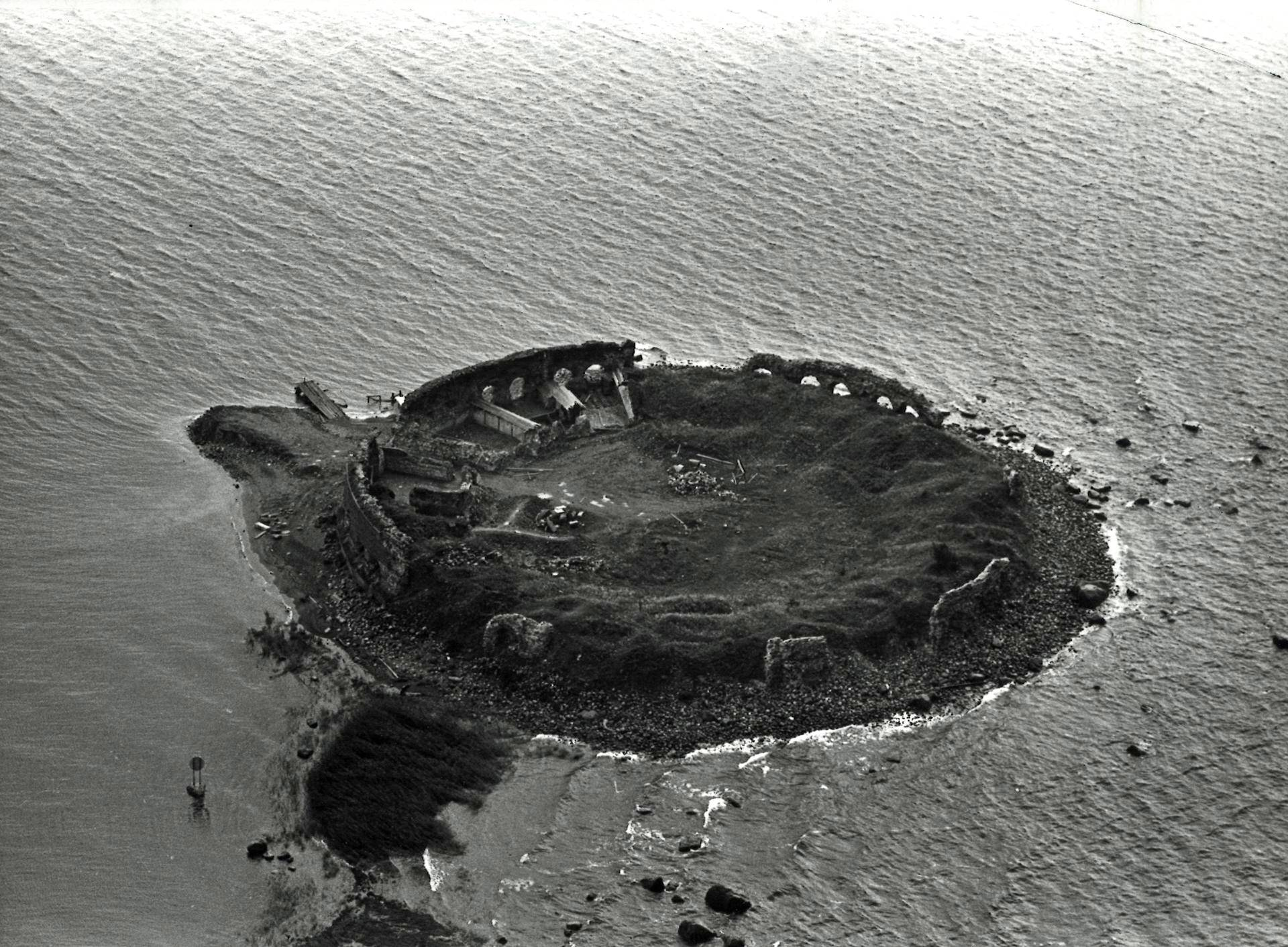
An Aerial photo of Fort Slava in 1970.

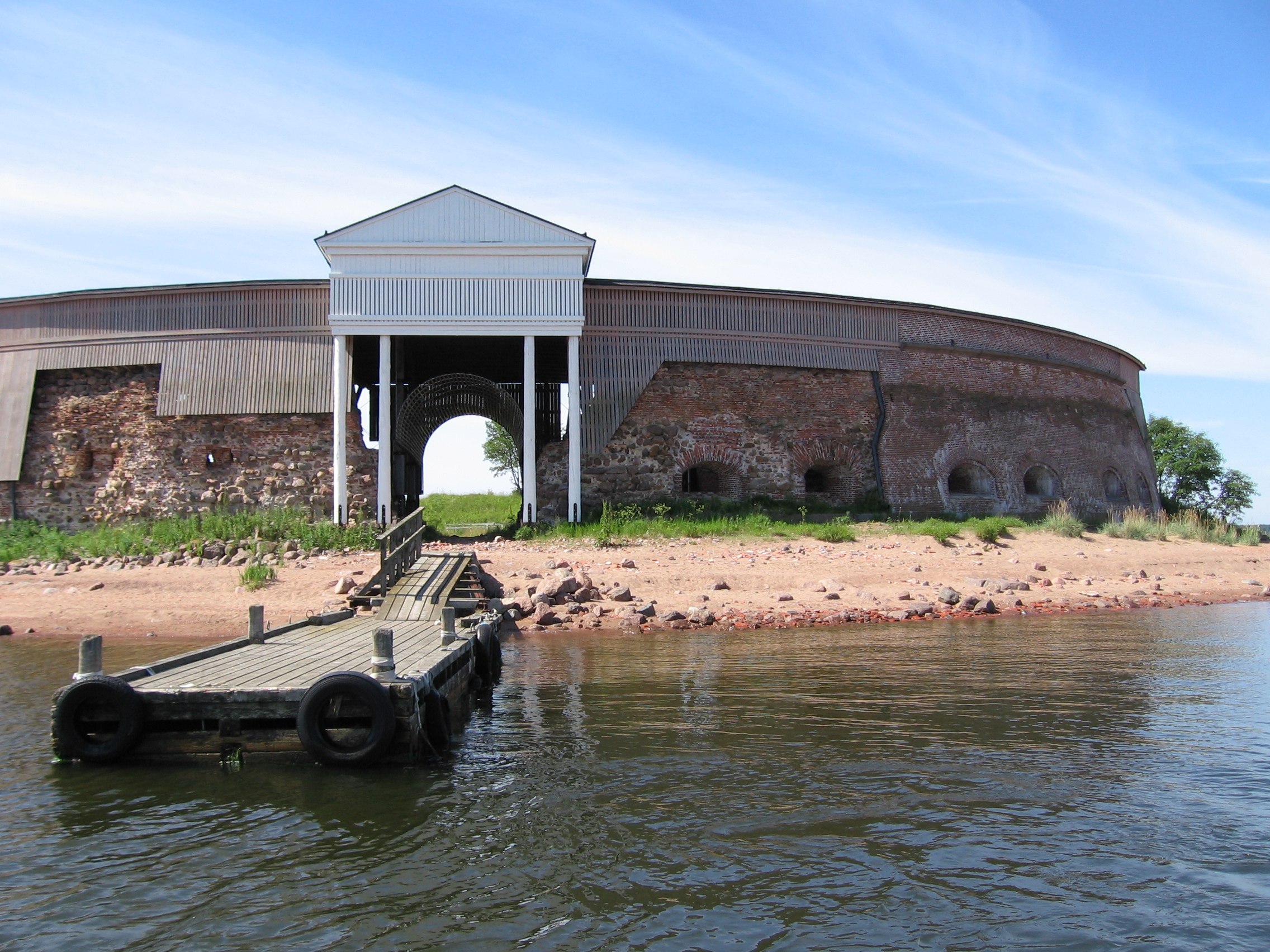
Part of Fort Slava after it had been restored.

After the war, Fort Slava became a monument in 1899. Part of the fort was reconstructed to what it once was by using historical records between 1988 and 1993. Only part of Fort Slava was restored, leaving most of the ruins alone. A small dock was also constructed to facilitate visitors to the island.
