= Fullerö Castle =

- Västerås Municipality, Sweden
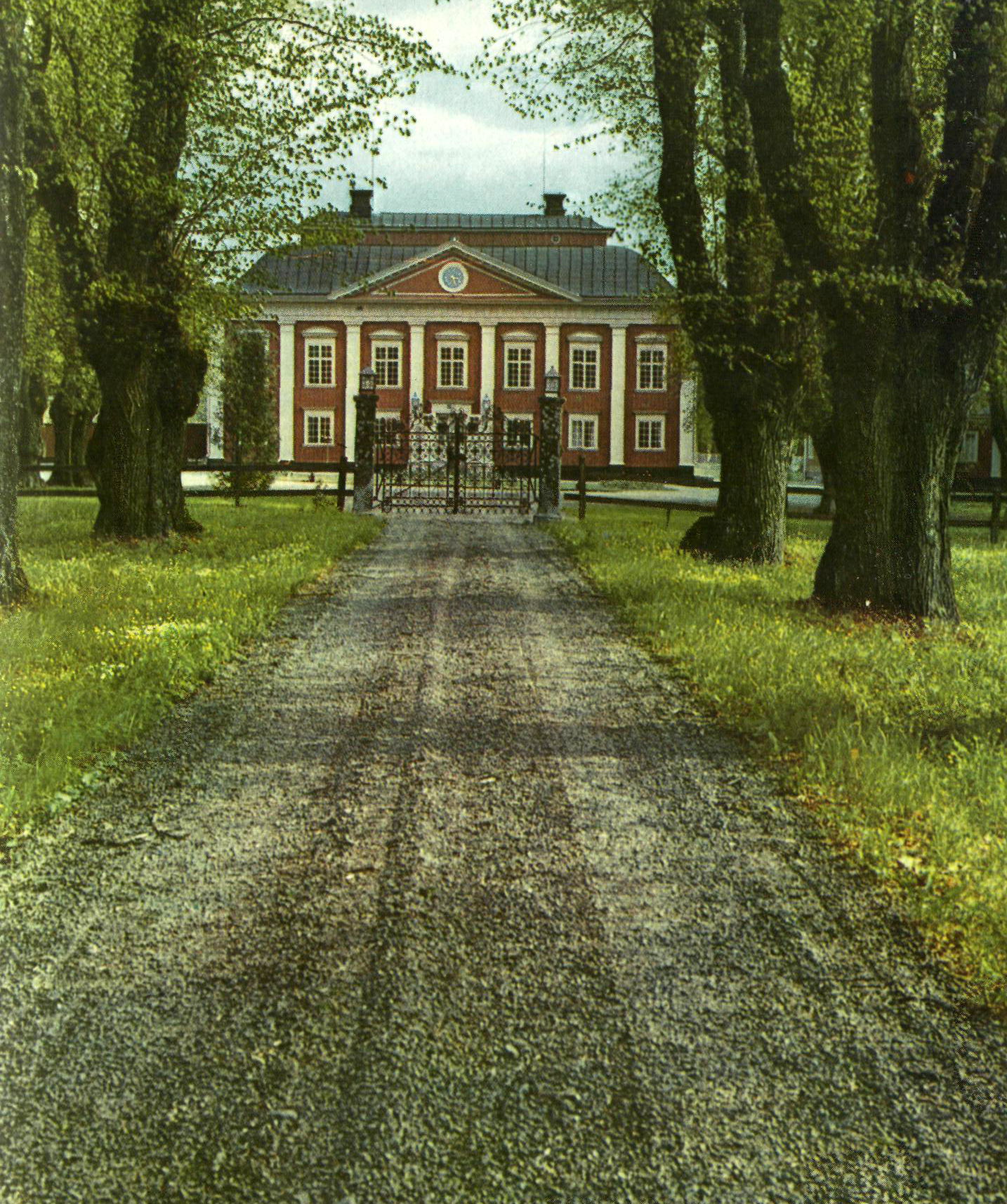

Site information
- Type: Castle

Location
- Coordinates: 59°32′51″N 16°32′45″E

Fullerö Castle is a castle and fideicommissum since 1739, in Barkarö, Sweden. Augustin Ehrensvärd, who was in charge of building the Suomenlinna (Sveaborg) fortress, was born in Fullerö Castle. The comital family Cronstedt acquired the castle in the 17th century.

== See also ==
- List of castles in Sweden
