= Augustin Ehrensvärd =

18th-century Swedish military officer, architect, and artist

Field Marshal Count Augustin Ehrensvärd
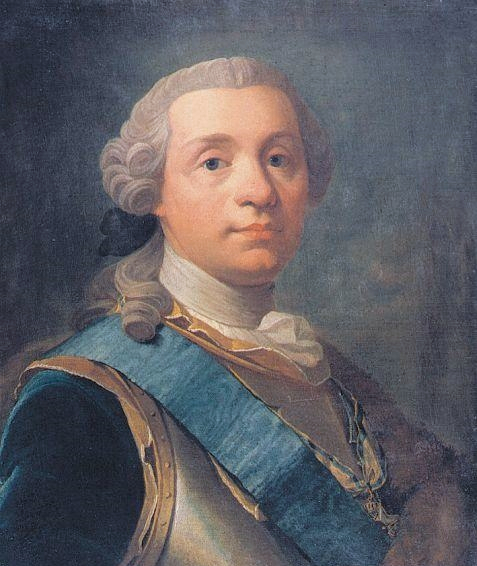
- Portrait of Augustin Ehrensvärd, by Olof Arenius
- Born: 25 September 1710; Fullerö Castle, Sweden
- Died: 4 October 1772 (aged 62); Saris, Mynämäki, Finland
- Burial place: Suomenlinna
- Spouse: Catharina Elisabeth Adlerheim
- Children: Carl August
- Relatives: Johan Jacob Ehrensvärd (father); Anna Margaretha (mother)
- Military career
- Allegiance: Sweden
- Branch: Swedish Army
- Service years: 1739–1772
- Rank: Field Marshal
- Conflicts: Russo-Swedish War (1741–1743); War of the Austrian Succession; Battle of Soor; Pomeranian War
- Awards: Royal Order of the Seraphim; Order of the Sword

Field Marshal count Augustin Ehrensvärd (25 September 1710 – 4 October 1772) was a Swedish military officer, military architect, artist, creator of the Suomenlinna (Sveaborg) fortress, Svartholm fortress and the Swedish archipelago fleet. He was born in Fullerö Castle, Barkarö and died in the village of Saris, Mynämäki.

In 1747, he was chosen by king Frederick I of Sweden to design and construct a maritime fortress near Helsinki in Finland, then a part of the Kingdom of Sweden. Building the fortress of Sveaborg became a life's work for Ehrensvärd, who kept expanding the island fortress until his death in 1772. Ehrensvärd's design was a low-profile bastion-type fortress that would follow the natural contours of the islands and thus remain inconspicuous to enemy fleets. Many of the constructions in Sveaborg are considered to be architectural masterpieces. Augustin Ehrensvärd was also the commander of the Swedish archipelago fleet from 1756 to 1766, and from 1770, until his death in 1772.

In addition to architecture, Ehrensvärd's interests included painting, educational psychology and botany. Upon his death in 1772, Ehrensvärd was promoted to the rank of field marshal. He was also well respected by the Finnish people, who appreciated his efforts in the construction of Sveaborg, an important cultural and economic centre in the eastern part of 18th-century Sweden, which later would become modern Finland. Ehrensvärd's burial monument in Sveaborg was designed by king Gustav III of Sweden himself.

Ehrensvärd was elected a member of the member of the Royal Swedish Academy of Sciences in 1739, the year it was founded.

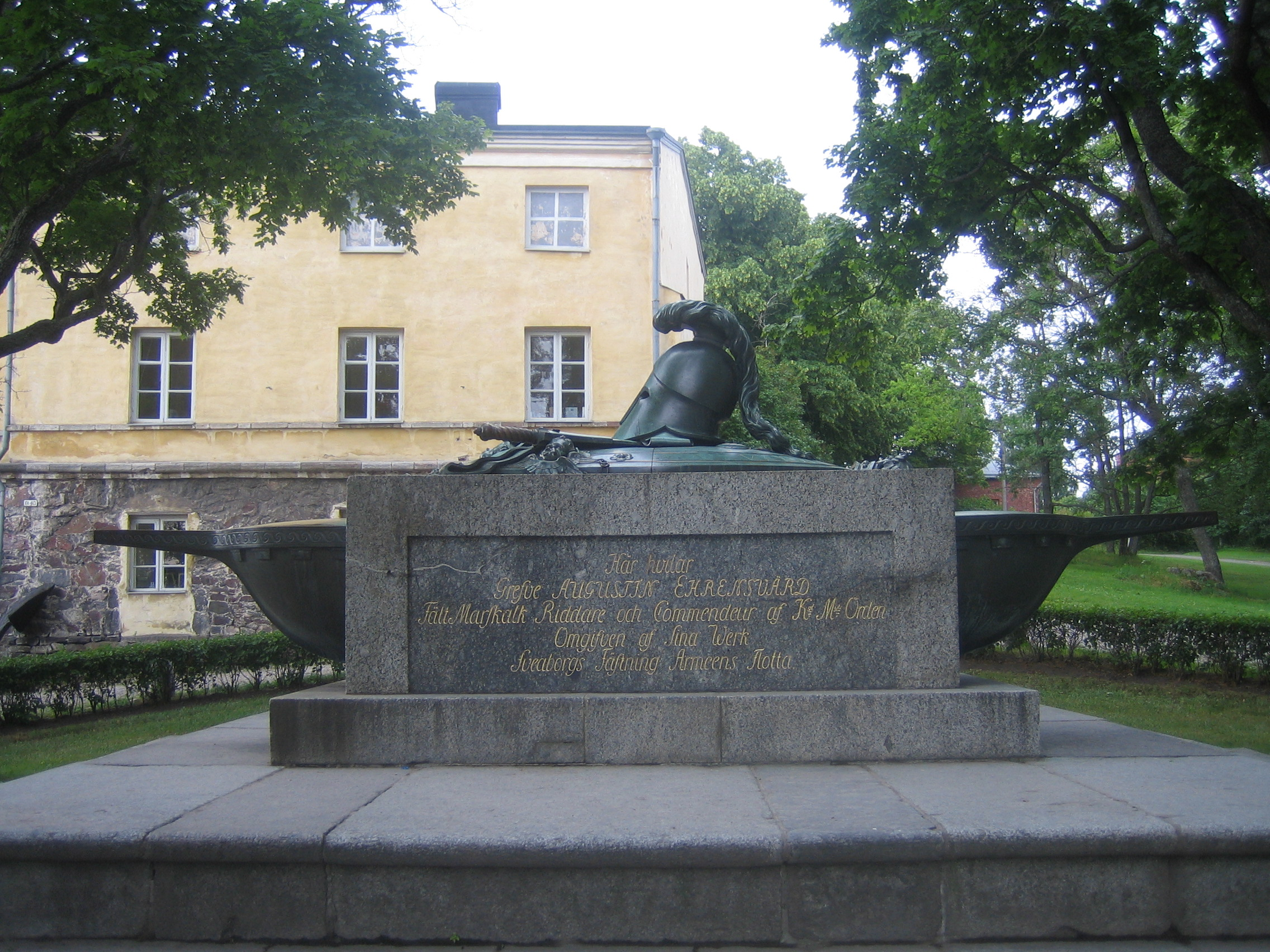
Augustin Ehrensvärd's tomb at the Suomenlinna fortress

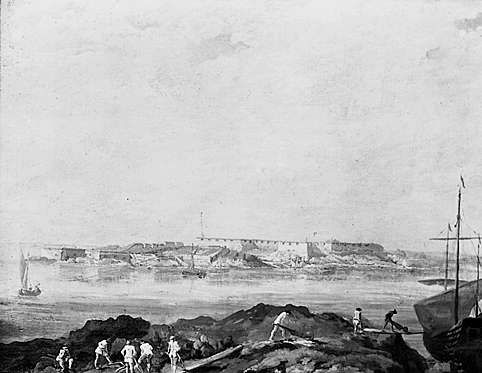
"View over Sveaborg" by Augustin Ehrensvärd

== See also ==
- Suomenlinna (Sveaborg)
