= Christian Fredrik Kress =

German military bandmaster active in Finland (1767–1812)

Christian Friedrich Kress
- Born: 19 March 1767; Germany
- Died: 21 November 1812 (aged 45); Helsingfors, Finland
- Occupations: Military bandmaster, composer, arranger
- Known for: Association with Björneborgarnas marsch
- Spouse: Helena

Christian Friedrich Kress (19 March 1767 – 21 November 1812) was a German military bandmaster, composer and arranger active in Finland. He is associated with the Pori Brigade March (Finnish: Porin prikaatin marssi; Swedish: Björneborgarnas marsch), the official march of honour of the Finnish Defence Forces, though it is more likely that he only arranged the march for piano, or at most composed its trio section.

== Biography ==
The exact date of Kress's arrival in Finland is not known. By 1799 at the latest he had moved to Helsingfors, where he served as bandmaster of the wind orchestra of the Dowager Queen's Life Regiment at Sveaborg. He led the military band during the visit of King Gustav IV Adolf in 1802. That same year he was appointed to perform the duties of organist at the Helsingfors city parish, succeeding the music non-commissioned officer A. C. Medelberg of the Finnish Artillery Regiment.

Kress probably led all the military bands at Sveaborg, though this has not been fully established. It has been suggested that he left his post as bandmaster at Sveaborg for a corresponding post at the Finnish Artillery Regiment; this is supported by the fact that all the godfathers of his son, born in 1806, were officers in that regiment.

During his lifetime Kress was known as a prolific composer and arranger, earning the epithet "the march king". His name is most closely associated with the Pori Brigade March, the present march of honour of the Finnish Defence Forces. Although he has often been credited as the composer of the melody, it is more probable that his contribution was limited to a piano arrangement, or at most the composition of the trio section.

When Sveaborg surrendered during the Finnish War of 1808–1809 and the military bands in Finland were dissolved, Kress was left with a modest income as a piano teacher and piano tuner. He died in Helsingfors on 21 November 1812.
