= Lonna =

Island in Helsinki, Finland

Coordinates: 60°09′14.68″N 24°59′22.23″E

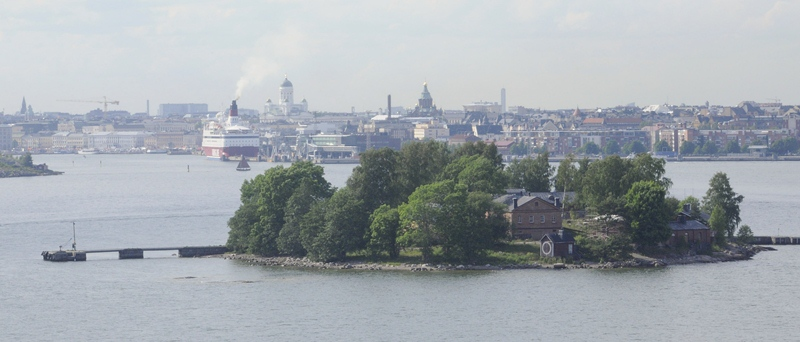
Lonna as seen from the sea

Lonna (Swedish: Lonnan) is a small island off Helsinki, opposite the Suomenlinna Passenger terminal. The island belongs to the Suomenlinna district. Lonna is about 150 meters long and the distance to the mainland is about 1.5 kilometers.

The island was used by the Finnish Defence Forces until the beginning of the 21st century. Renovation of the island for other uses began in the 21st century, and in 2014 the island was opened to the public. The island currently has a summer and bespoke restaurant, an event space and a public sauna. The island is served by a tourist ferry.

== History ==
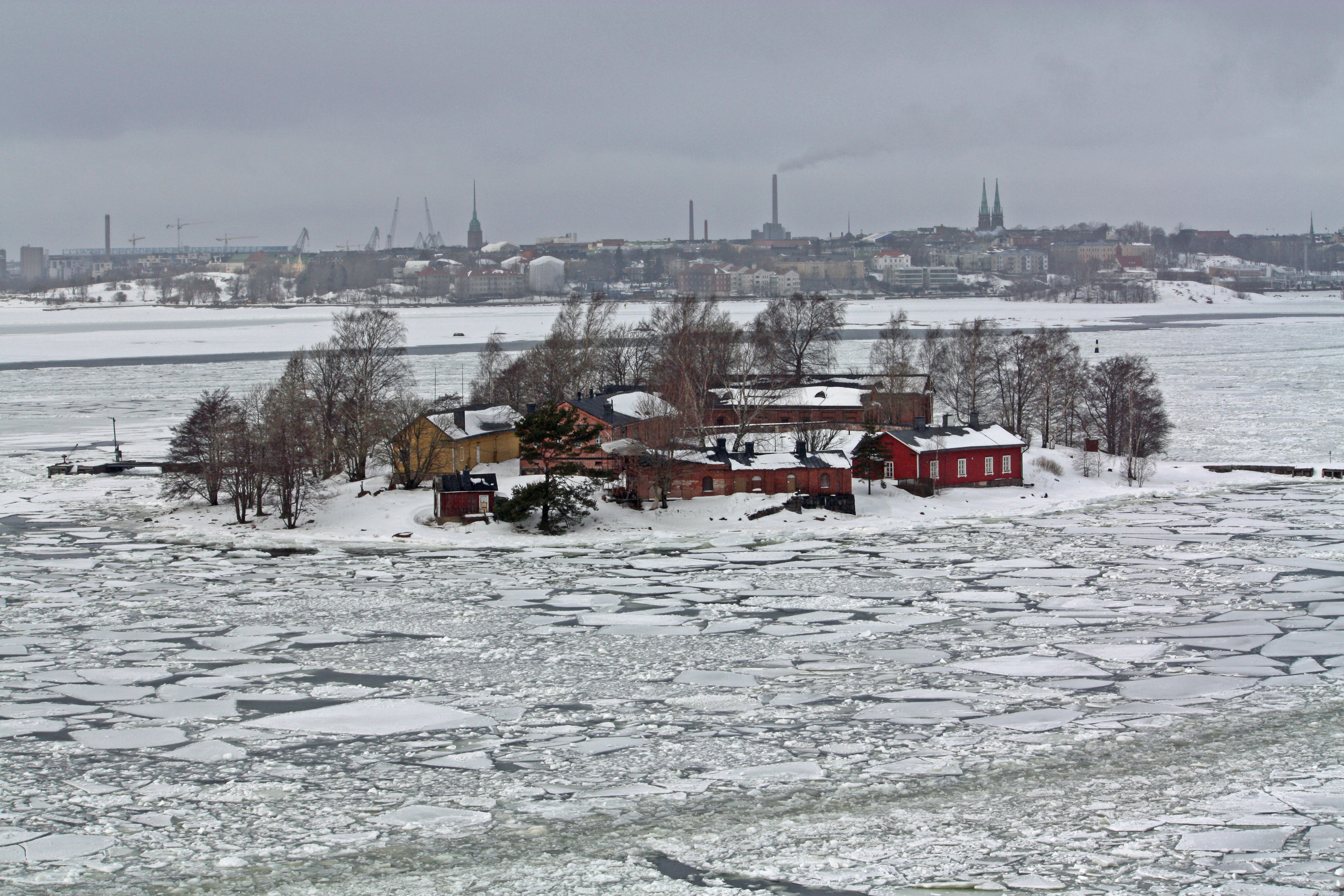
Lonna in the winter

During the Finland under Swedish rule, Lonna was owned by the City of Helsinki. During the Finnish War, negotiations on the surrender of the Sveaborg Fortress (Suomenlinna) were held on the island on a couple of occasions. For this reason, during the Russian rule, the island was called Peregovorny Island ("negotiation island").

During the war years and after that, until 1955, there was a demagnetization station on the island related to the fight against magnetic mines. The method was simple: Finnish, German and metal-hulled ships from allied / neutral states moving in the war zone came to the station once a month, where power lines were laid around them. A power current was applied to the wires, which was allowed to act for six to eight hours per vessel, depending on the size. This removed the magnetism of the hulls and machinery from the ships and made them as immune as possible to magnetic mines. The two Brown-Boveri diesel generators at the demagnetization station and the equipment control table are still in place. The second generator is in working order, the second engine was cut into trial operation in 1994.

Since 2006, the property on the island has been renovated as a prisoner of the Suomenlinna Labor camp. The intention is to make the former Finnish Defense Forces buildings operational and possibly leasable. At the same time, other terrain structures in the area, such as rock embankments, are being repaired. As always in protected areas, the changes are only restorative. Only improvements in electrification must be modernized, but even these changes must not be visible to the outside world.

In May 2014, the island was opened to the public.

== Change ==
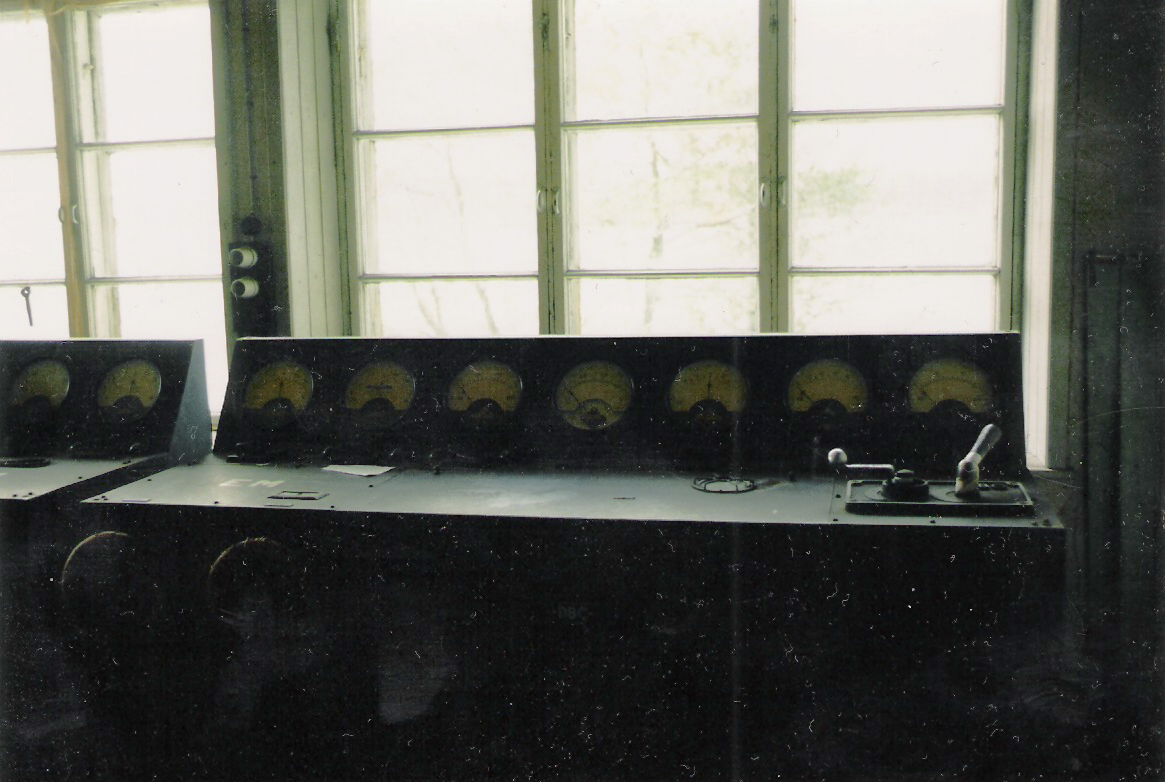
Control panel of the Lonna demagnetization station

As there are quarries in the island that have remained almost original, it has been suggested that the mine museum, which is now temporarily located in Pansio, be located in Lonna. The biggest difficulty is the island's transport links.

In the 1990s, the idea was put forward that minesweepers would be turned into an urn cemetery for non-believers. However, the proposal was firmly rejected: UNESCO, whose World Heritage Site also includes Suomenlinna, requires that the areas included in the Suomenlinna fortification district also remain unchanged – and Lonna belongs to the fortification district. Even the pier was not to be made a permanent place to scatter ashes in the sea; these measures may be carried out, but in Lonna they are exceptional cases considered on a case-by-case basis and are carried out only at the written request of the cremated deceased before his death and confirmed by two witnesses.

The island has a sauna and common areas for the Suomenlinna Executive Officers' Club.

The episodes of Nelonen's adventure program Saari were filmed in Lonna.
