= Suomenlinna (district) =

Neighbourhood of Helsinki, Finland

A map of the city of Helsinki with Suomenlinna highlighted in red.

Suomenlinna (Swedish: Sveaborg) is a village-like district of the city of Helsinki, Finland with about 700 inhabitants. Its best known part is the maritime fortress of Suomenlinna.

The district of Suomenlinna is part of the Ullanlinna major district.

The district of Suomenlinna consists of eight islands, of which the islands of Kustaanmiekka, Susisaari, Iso Mustasaari, Pikku Mustasaari and Länsi-Mustasaari are connected with each other through bridges or causeways. The strait which previously separated the islands of Susisaari and Kustaanmiekka has been filled with reclaimed land. These islands are bordered to the east by the Kustaanmiekan salmi strait and to the west by the Särkänsalmi strait, which are the most important ship routes leading from the open sea to the Kruunuvuorenselkä water area and the South Harbour. Other islands in the Suomenlinna district include Särkkä, Lonna and Pormestarinluodot. The land surface area of Suomenlinna is 2.21 square kilometres, and in late 2017 the district had jobs for 446 persons.

There are about 350 apartments in Suomenlinna, of which 330 are owned by the state of Finland and leased by the Governing Body of Suomenlinna. The city of Helsinki owns about 10 rental apartments and about 10 buildings are in private ownership.

The streets in Suomenlinna do not have names. Postal addresses consist of a letter designating the island (A=Kustaanmiekka, B=Susisaari, C=Iso Mustasaari, D=Pikku-Mustasaari and E=Länsi-Mustasaari) and the house number, possibly also including an additional letter designating the correct stairway. For example the address "Suomenlinna C 83" refers to the house number 83 on the island of Iso Mustasaari. The addresses in Suomenlinna also have the stairway and apartment numbers as normal. The postal code of Suomenlinna is 00190.
