= Ehrensvärd grave =

Coordinates: 60°8′39.22″N 24°59′6.34″E

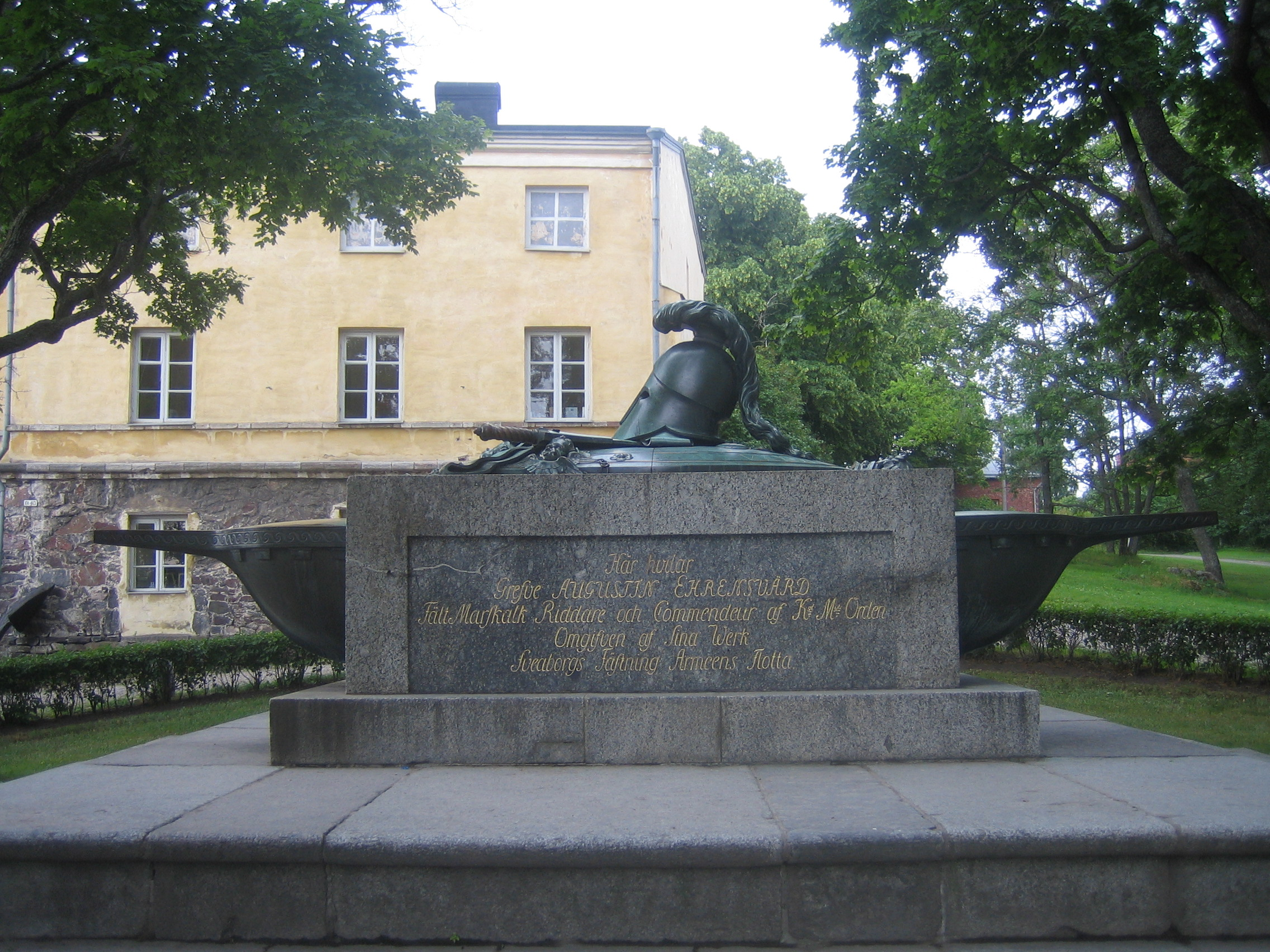
The Ehrensvärd grave.

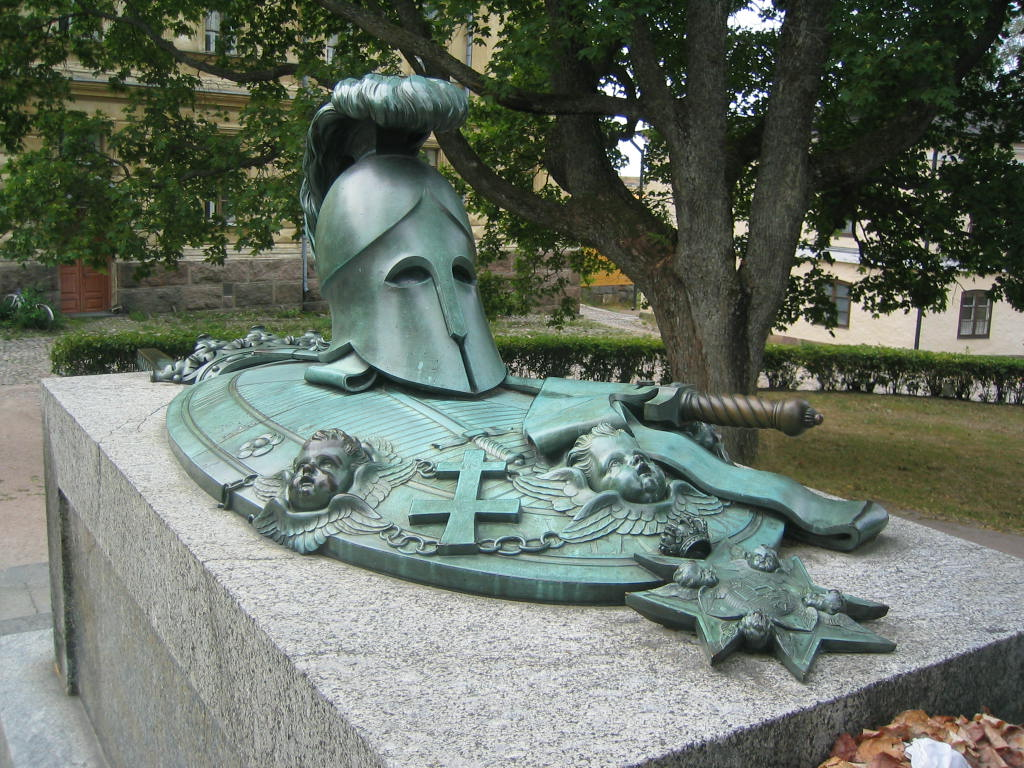
A detail of the ornaments of the Ehrensvärd grave.

The Ehrensvärd grave is the final resting place and memorial of Augustin Ehrensvärd, the founder of the Suomenlinna island fortress in Helsinki, Finland, at the Linnanpiha yard on the island of Susisaari in Suomenlinna. Ehrensvärd was buried at the yard in 1783 but the memorial was only completed in its current form in 1805.

After Ehrensvärd's death in 1772 king Gustaf III of Sweden gave an order that he should be buried at the yard at the heart of the fortress of Sveaborg (later known in Finnish as Suomenlinna). Construction of the tomb took eleven years, during which time the body of Ehrensvärd rested in a temporary grave at the cemetery of the Ulrika Eleonora Church in Helsinki. Ehrensvärd's coffin was moved to Suomenlinna and placed into the fortress tomb on 5 July 1783 in a solemn event attended by the king himself.

== Memorial ==
King Gustaf III sketched a design for Ehrensvärd's memorial himself. The sketch was finished by Ehrensvärd's son Carl August Ehrensvärd and the memorial was made by the most famous sculptor in Sweden, Johan Tobias Sergel. The metal used for the bronze ornaments in the memorial was melted down from Russian cannons obtained as war bounty from the battle of Svensksund in 1790. The memorial was finally completed in 1805.

The pedestal of the Ehrensvärd memorial is made of granite. The memorial consists of an oblong rectangular granite slab with a bronze ship bow at both ends. On the top of the slab are a shield, a sword, a helmet and a chain of the Order of the Seraphim, all cast from bronze. The southern and northern sides of the memorial bear an inscription in 18th-century Swedish:

Här Hvilar Grefve Augustin Ehrensvärd FältMarskalk Riddare och Kommendeur af Kgl Mjits Orden Omgifven af Sina verk Sveaborgs fästning Armeens Flotta.

"Here rests Count Augustin Ehrensvärd, field marshal knight and commander of the order of His Royal Majesty, in the middle of his own work, the fortress of Sveaborg, the fleet of the army."

Although the memorial does not bear a personal portrait, its classicist style resembles the conventions of its contemporary memorials of European war heroes.
