= Governing Body of Suomenlinna =

Coordinates: 60°08′47.6″N 24°59′15.5″E

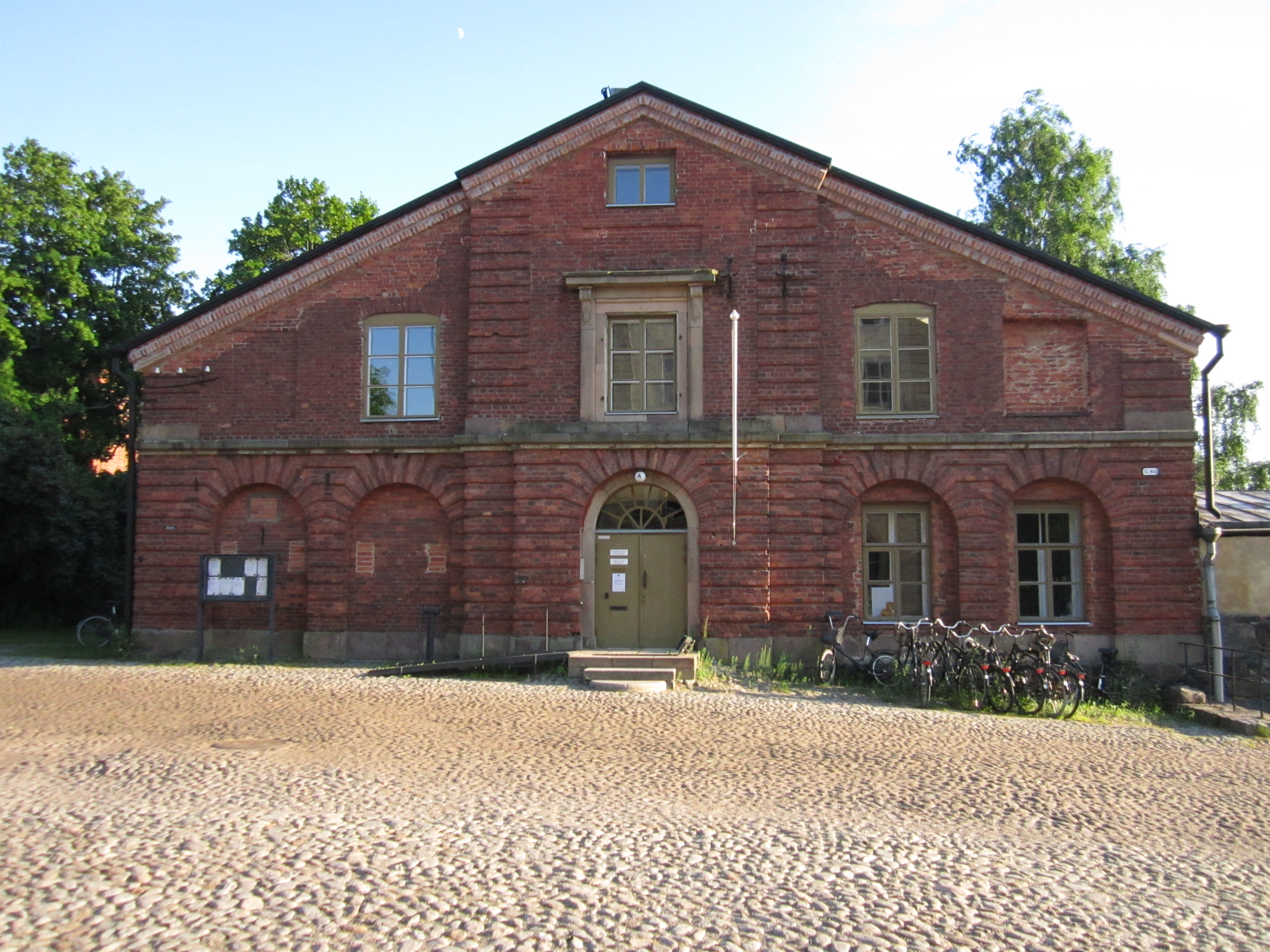
The office of the Governing Body of Suomenlinna at Suomenlinna C 40, 00190 Helsinki.

The Governing Body of Suomenlinna (Finnish: Suomenlinnan hoitokunta) is a bureau belonging to the Ministry of Education and Culture in Finland, whose task is to restore, maintain, demonstrate and govern the island fortress of Suomenlinna, a Unesco World Heritage, in Helsinki, Finland. The governing body was founded in 1973 when ownership of Suomenlinna was transferred from the Finnish Defence Forces to a civilian government. The organisation is divided into four units, consisting of government, maintenance, world heritage and restoration services.

== Duties ==
The duties of the governing body include restoration and maintenance of the fortress, buildings and landscape, leasing of apartments as well as premises for meetings, celebrations and offices, demonstrating the fortress to visitors and government of Suomenlinna. The work is based on a strategy extending to 2025. The work is also guided by a maintenance and usage plan for 2020 to 2024 and an activity program.

The Governing Body of Suomenlinna employs about 70 full-time employees and a large number of seasonal employees. The staff consists of gardeners, architects, building caretakers, tourist informers, carpenters, electricians, painters and various managers.

== Decisions ==
The decisive body of the Governing Body of Suomenlinna is a management board assembling three to four times per year, consisting of representatives of four different ministries, the city of Helsinki, the Board of Antiques, the Senaatti building management body, the Helsinki parish co-operative, the inhabitants of Suomenlinna and the governing body itself.

The Governing Body of Suomenlinna acts as the host of the World Heritage Site, but the site is developed in connection with various bodies and entrepreneurs as well as the citizens' community.

== Finances ==
The income of the governing body consists mainly from rent from apartments and meeting and celebration premises as well as landscape maintenance done as a for-pay service.

The budget is used to pay for all activity of the governing body: restoration of all eight islands of Suomenlinna and its buildings and apartments, maintenance of the fortress, caretaking, demonstrating the fortress to visitors, management of the area and the bureau as well as salaries of the about 70 full-time employees and numerous seasonal employees.

The governing body cooperates with the Suomenlinna prison, and financing projects done with prisoner labour comes from the ministry of education.

== Responsible activity ==
The responsibility of the activity plays a central part in the activity of the Governing Body of Suomenlinna. The activity is both financially and socially responsible as well as inclusive of networks and stakeholders. The visitor site of Suomenlinna is developed through a strategy for lasting travel and aiming to make Suomenlinna accessible both physically and digitally.
