= Cronstedt =

Cronstedt is a surname. Notable people with the surname include:

- Axel Fredrik Cronstedt, Swedish chemist
- Carl Olof Cronstedt, Swedish naval commander
- Carl Johan Cronstedt, Swedish architect, inventor, Earl, noble, civil servant, scientist and bibliophile
- Claes Cronstedt, Swedish corporate lawyer
- Dagmar Cronstedt (1919–2006), Swedish countess and radio personality
- Johan Adam Cronstedt, Swedish general
