= Kekri (festival) =

Finnish autumn festival

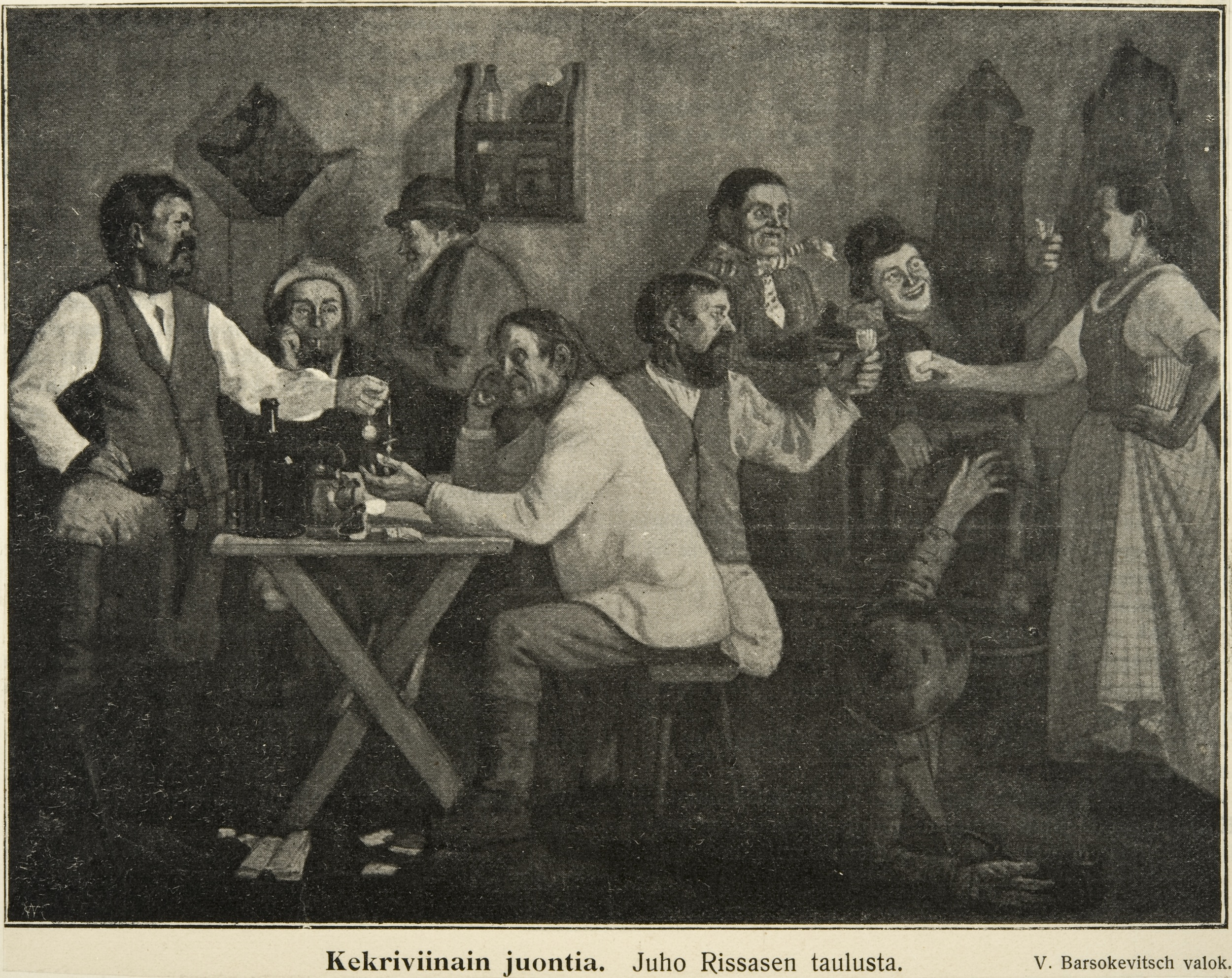

Kekri, also known as keyri, köyri, köyry (in Torne Valley) kööri and kegri (in Karelian), is a Finnish and Karelian harvest festival, celebrated in the fall. Kekri was once widely celebrated in Finland and Karelia, but it has been largely eclipsed by Christmas. Historically, Kekri has also referred to a deity.

Originally, the celebration of Kekri was not tied to a permanent calendar date, but – instead – was determined by the ongoing year's agricultural autumn activities. However, by the early 19th century, it came to coincide with All Saints' Day in Western Finland and Michaelmas in Eastern Finland.

== Etymology ==
In various Finnish dialects, the term kekri and its cognates have been used to refer to the last of a thing left, residuum, or most commonly – and possibly originally – the harvest season. The term has historically also been used to indicate a genius loci, or even a scarecrow.

In his listing of Finnish deities in 1551, the Finnish author Mikael Agricola defined Kekri as a deity that enhances the growth of livestock: "Käkri se liseis Carjan casvon". In his study 'Mythologica fennica' in 1789, Cristfried Ganander stated the same about Kekri, and added that the term Kekri also refers to the celebration of the end of the harvest season.

== Kekri customs ==
=== Ancestor veneration ===
The remembrance of the dead features heavily in traditional Kekri observances. Traditionally, each family invited the spirits of their deceased relatives to return during the Kekri feast, making the first part of Kekri formal and serious. According to E. Castrén's account, the head of the household welcomed the spirits in at the edge of his yard on the evening before the feast day. They were then led to the sauna, which had been heated and cleaned for their use. A table with votive offerings of meat and drink had also been placed there. On the evening after the feast day, the host ushered the spirits out of the yard while baring his head and pouring a libation of brandy and beer.

=== Masked visitors ===
On the second day of Kekri, people traditionally paid visits to friends and neighbors, dressed up as various types of masked characters, referred to as kekritärs (kekri-ess) or kekripukkis (kekri goat) (cf. souling). The masked visitors would demand hospitality, threatening to break the oven if their requests were not heeded. These Kekri characters of the past are commonly viewed as predecessors to Finland's modern-day Santa Claus, Joulupukki (literally Yule Goat).

=== Divination ===
As Kekri is a turn-of-the-year celebration, insuring good luck and a successful harvest in the following year is of primary importance. There are many rites concerned with divining the fortune of the coming year. One such custom involves pouring molten tin into cold water. The shape of the cooled tin was interpreted to predict future events. Another custom involves counting the sticks in the oven or hearth, and deducing the number of deaths in the coming year from the number of missing sticks the following morning.

=== Other customs ===
Traditionally, the end of the harvest season has been celebrated with abundant feasts, which often have included lamb roast as one of the courses served. Various kinds of magic, spells, beliefs and myths, as well as bonfires, have also been an important part of old Kekri traditions, especially in certain parts of Finland.

== Kekri today ==
The traditional household Kekri celebration has lent itself to a new interpretation as a municipal or organizational holiday. Today, it is celebrated as such in the city of Kajaani by the burning of the giant, so-called Kekri goat (Finnish: Kekripukki), constructed by local actors out of straw. The incineration of the Kekri goat usually coincides with other programs and activities, such as dances and musical performances, a street market, feasts, etc. Kekri is celebrated similarly in other parts of Finland, for instance in the Southern Finnish island of Suomenlinna, where various events are prepared annually in honor of Kekri. The celebrations typically have included abundant feasts, with lamb roast traditionally being part of the menu.

Although commercialized Halloween customs have begun to penetrate Finnish autumn traditions through influence of the United States, Kekri has held its ground. Partly due to the commercial nature of Halloween celebrations, many Finns prefer to maintain a distinction between Kekri or All Saints' Day (Finnish: Pyhäinpäivä) and commercialized Halloween traditions, though both of these days fall within the season of Allhallowtide.

Kekri celebrations began to wane with industrialization and urbanization in Finland in the early 1900s. The final divergence between Christmas and Kekri begun when public schools were opened in 1921. The original Kekri customs survived in Eastern Finland until fairly late. Some remaining Kekri customs and traditions have survived within modern Christmas and New Year's celebrations. Growing interest in folk culture has contributed to a resurgence of household Kekri celebrations. This revival of folk customs is accomplished through the use of ethnographic materials, as well as the reclaiming of Kekri traditions from Christmas and New Year's celebrations.

Kekri is still celebrated in some Karelian and Tver Karelian villages. Kekri was first celebrated in Petrozavodsk in 2019. The holiday received support from the Karelian government in 2022. Karelian activists suggested renaming Sverdlov street to Kegri street in Petrozavodsk in 2022.

== See also ==
- Vetrnætr
- Samhain
