= Suomenlinna prison =

Open prison in Helsinki, Finland

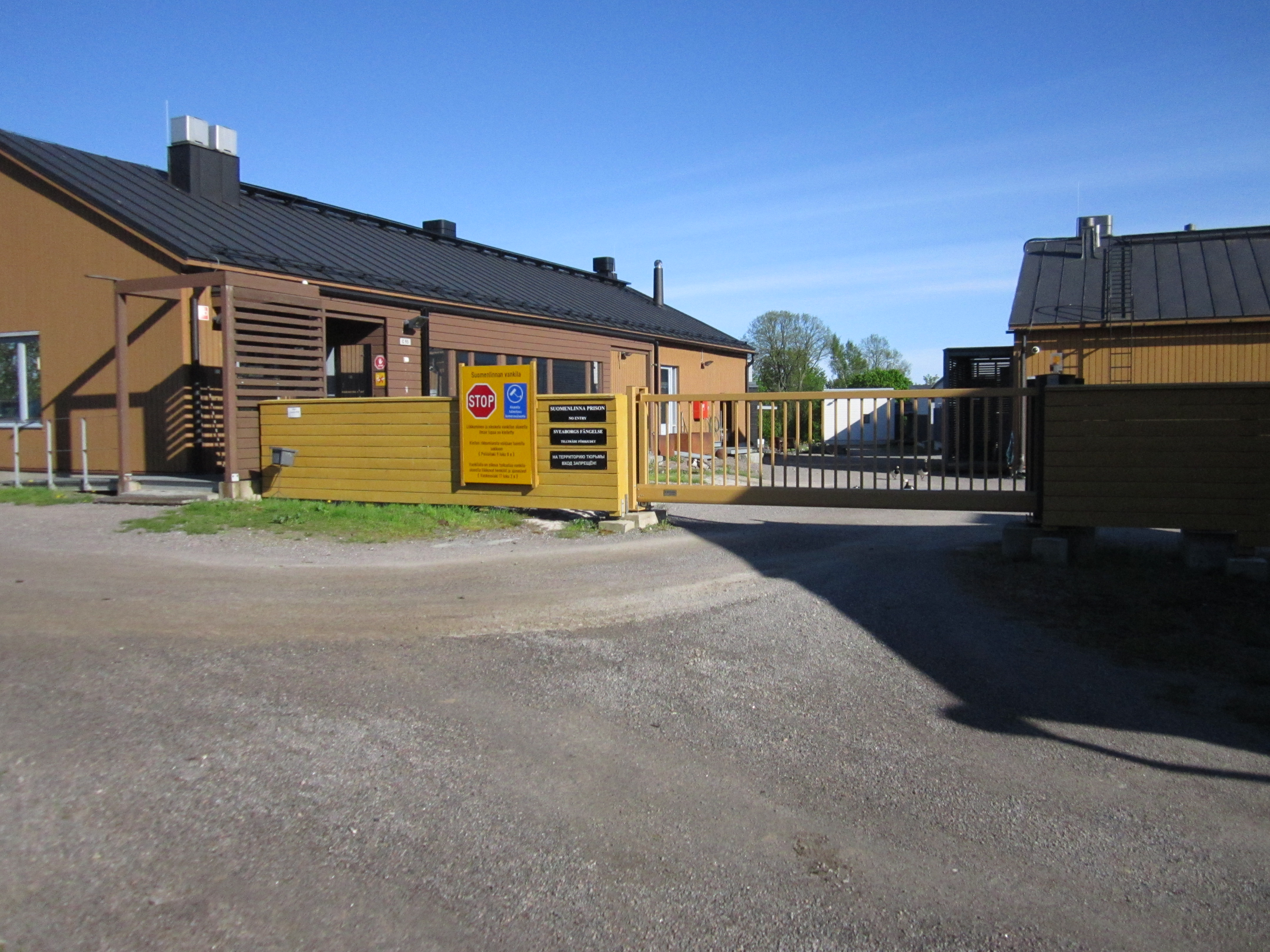
- The main gate to the Suomenlinna prison
- Interactive map of Suomenlinna prison
- Location: Suomenlinna, Helsinki, Finland; 60°08′38″N 24°59′31″E
- Security class: Open prison
- Capacity: c. 100
- Opened: 1971
- Website: Official Site

The Suomenlinna prison is an open prison in Suomenlinna, Helsinki, Finland, founded in 1971. It was previously known as the Suomenlinna penal colony. The prison is located at the southern tip of the island of Iso-Mustasaari. The prison was founded to help in the repair and restoration work of the Suomenlinna fortress; the prison co-operates with the Governing Body of Suomenlinna belonging to the Finnish Ministry of Education. Prisoners in the open prison, nicknamed Konnala (roughly translated as "Crook-land") work on weekdays in various jobs all over the island, under supervision. Most particularly they repair the buildings and stonework in Suomenlinna or maintain the scenery.

In 2017 the average number of prisoners was 137. There are places for 100 prisoners. Prisoners at the Suomenlinna prison are usually near the end of serving their sentences. Some of the prisoners are also studying while serving their sentences.

The prison employs about 30 people. The manager of the prison is Sinikka Saarela.
