= Suomenlinna Church =

Church and lighthouse in Finland

Harmaja Range Rear Light Suomenlinnan kirkko
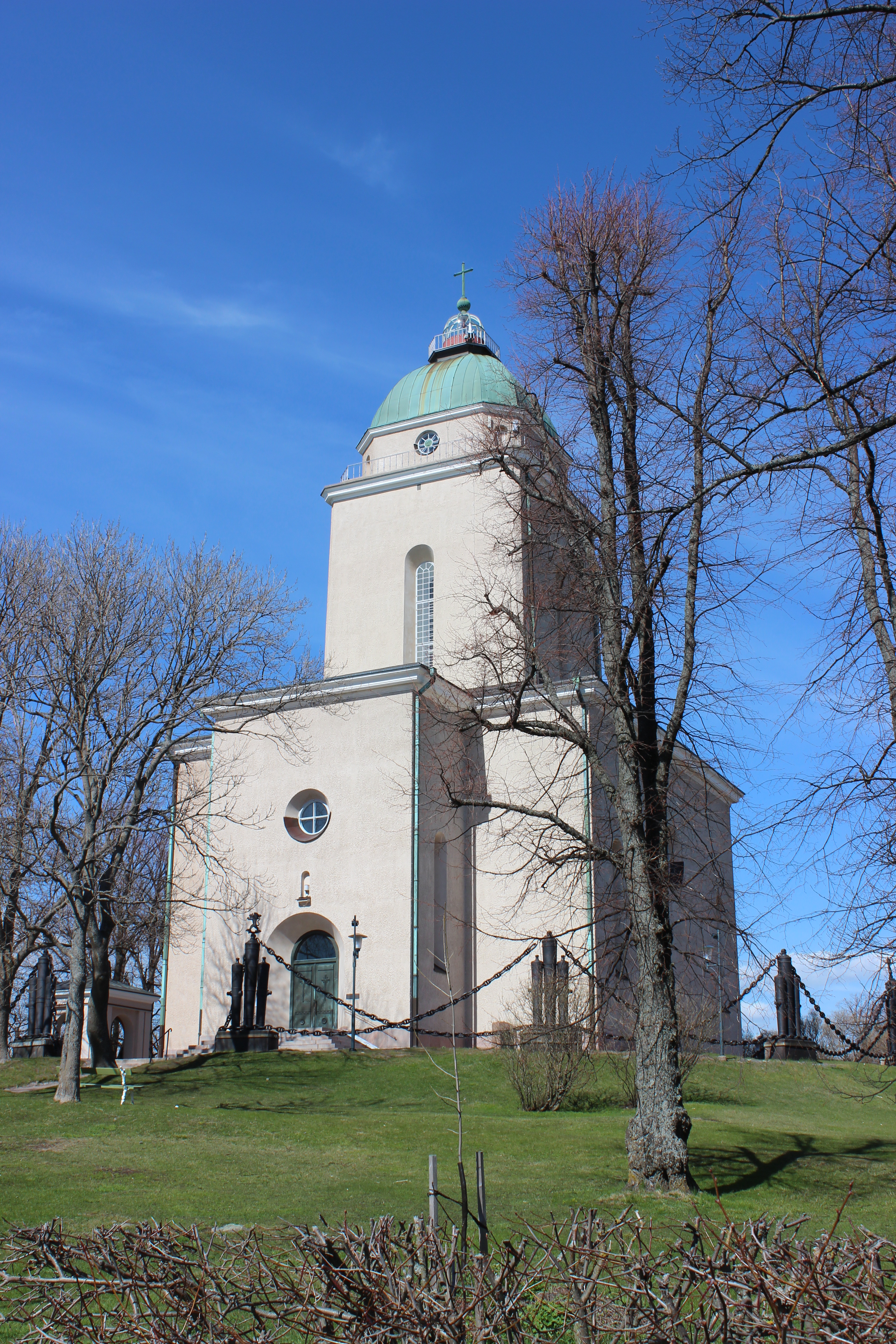
- Location: Iso Mustasaari, Suomenlinna, Helsinki, Finland
- Coordinates: 60°08′52″N 24°59′10″E

Tower
- Constructed: 1928
- Shape: square tower centered on a church
- Racon: M

Light
- Focal height: 54.2 m (178 ft)
- Range: 20.5 nmi (38.0 km; 23.6 mi)
- Characteristic: Fl(4) W 15s

The Suomenlinna Church (Finnish: Suomenlinnan kirkko, Swedish: Sveaborgs kyrka) in Helsinki, Finland, was built in 1854 as an Eastern Orthodox garrison church for the Russian troops stationed at the Suomenlinna sea fortress. The fortress comprises five islands joined by bridges, and the church is the central feature on the island of Iso Mustasaari (Swedish: Stora Östersvartö), located at its highest point. It is surrounded by other fortress buildings, but the old parade ground is immediately to the east, and a park lies immediately to the south. It is oriented southwest to northeast so that it would align with the Crownwork Ehrensvärd defense front located to the southwest of the church.

Before the design and construction of the Orthodox church, plans were drawn up in the 1820s by architect Carl Ludvig Engel for a church on the same site, but designed in the neoclassical style in keeping with the rest of buildings at the fortress and the buildings in the capital city, Helsinki. The actual church was designed by Konstantin Thon, an official architect of Imperial Russia during the reign of Czar Nicholas I, whose major works included the Cathedral of Christ the Saviour, the Grand Kremlin Palace, and the Kremlin Armoury in Moscow. The church was named for Saint/Prince Alexander Nevsky, who defeated the Swedes at the Neva battle of 1240. The Alexander Nevsky Church originally had five onion domes. The perimeter fence, constructed from cannons and chains, was erected in the 1870s. The church bell, the largest in Finland, was cast in Moscow in 1885 and weighs 6,683 kilograms. It is now displayed adjacent to the church. The church was elevated to the status of cathedral within the Orthodox faith in 1891.

In 1918 the Orthodox church was converted into an Evangelical Lutheran church, as Finland sought to indicate its new-found independence from Russia. The onion domes of the four smaller towers were immediately removed. The church's extensive iconography was warehoused by the city of Helsinki, but their current whereabouts are unknown. During the 1920s, it was decided to give the church an extensive renovation for structural repair as well as incorporation of a more Western design. The design competition was won by architect Einar Sjöström, and the finished church was reconsecrated on 28 April 1929.

Another interesting feature from the renovation is that the church's central dome has doubled as a lighthouse since 1929, making it one of only a few churches in the world that has that dual purpose. The lighthouse is officially the Harmaja Range Rear light, and it pairs with the Harmaja lighthouse (4.8 km south in the Gulf of Finland) as the Range Front light. The signal blink is the Morse code for the letter "H" for Helsinki.

Additional renovations have been made in the 1960s (after the church was turned over to the Evangelical Lutheran Parish Union of Helsinki), and again in the late 1980s and 1990s in preparation for the 250th anniversary of Suomenlinna in 1998. The Suomenlinna Church is still a very popular wedding site and one of the first landmarks for people arriving in Helsinki by sea.

== Gallery ==
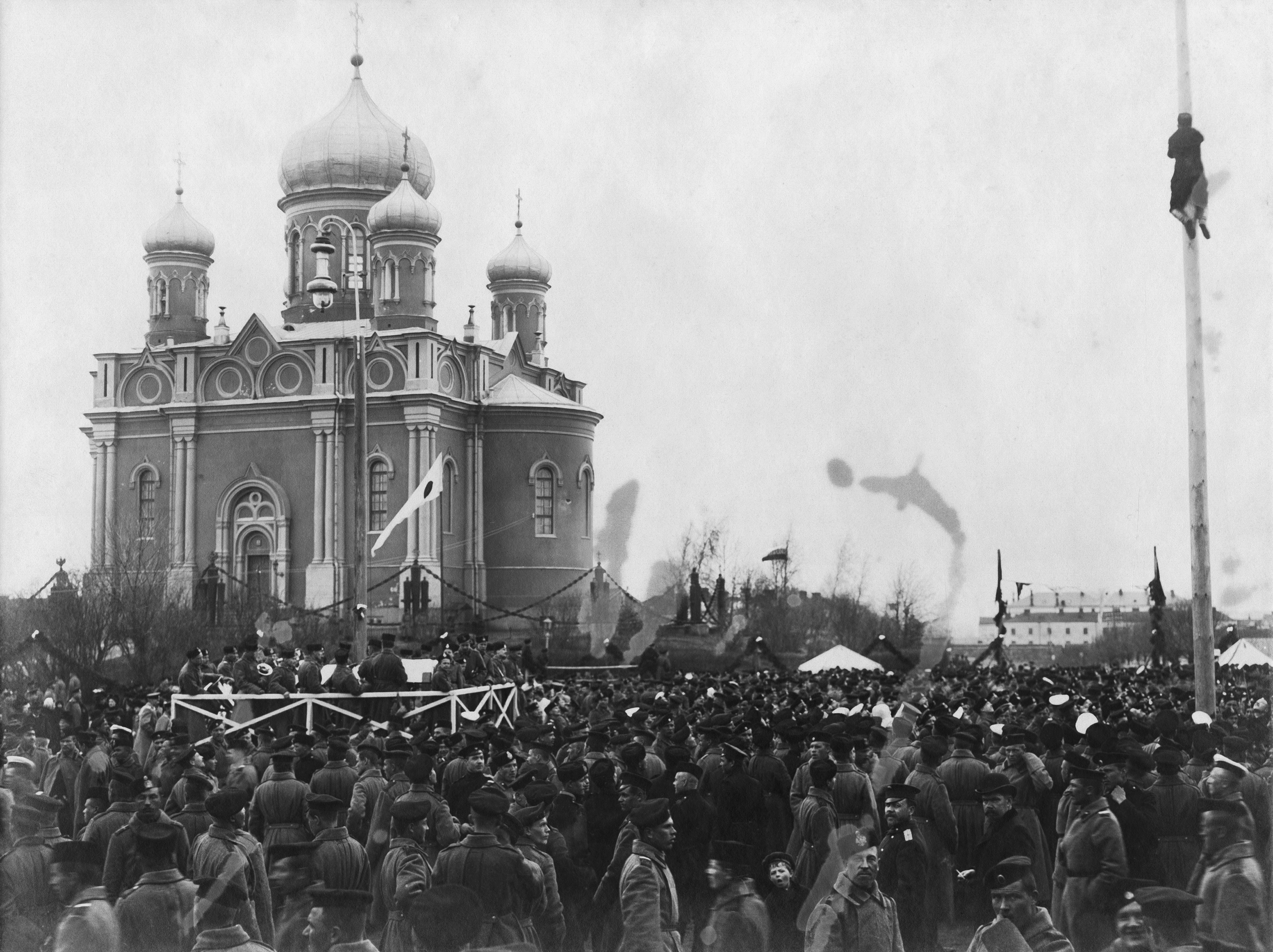
Suomenlinna church in 1908, before rebuilding

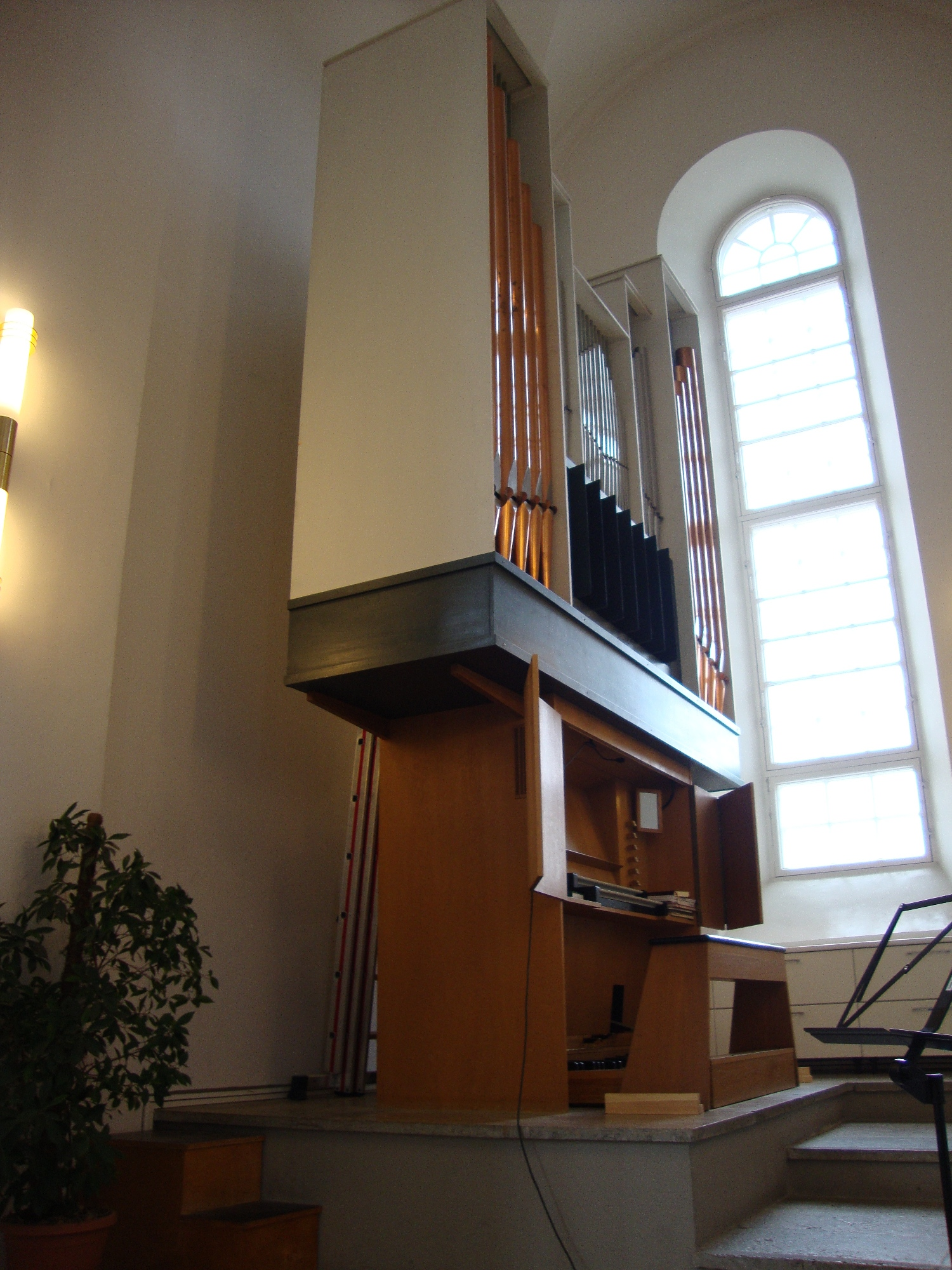
The organ

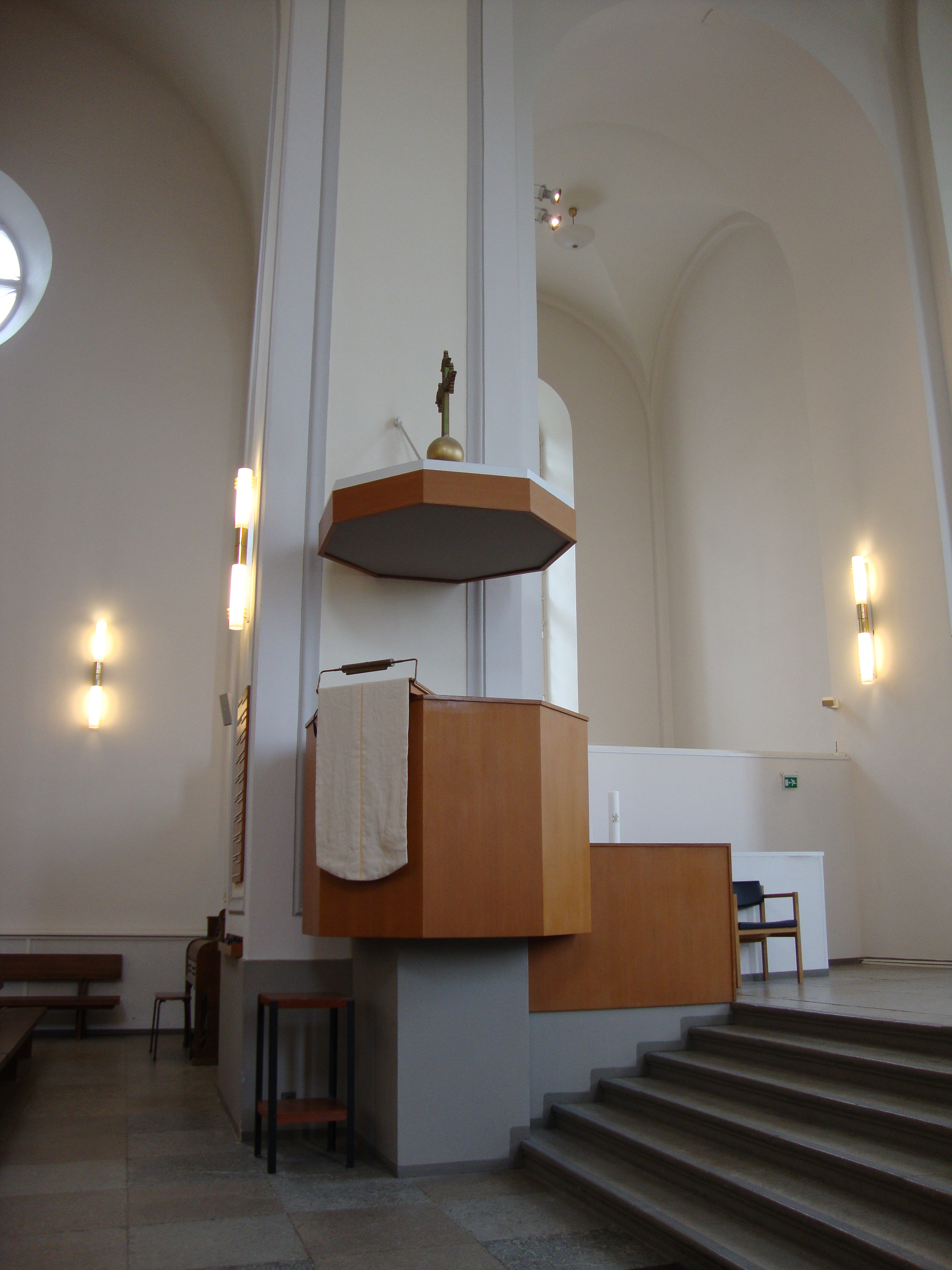
The pulpit

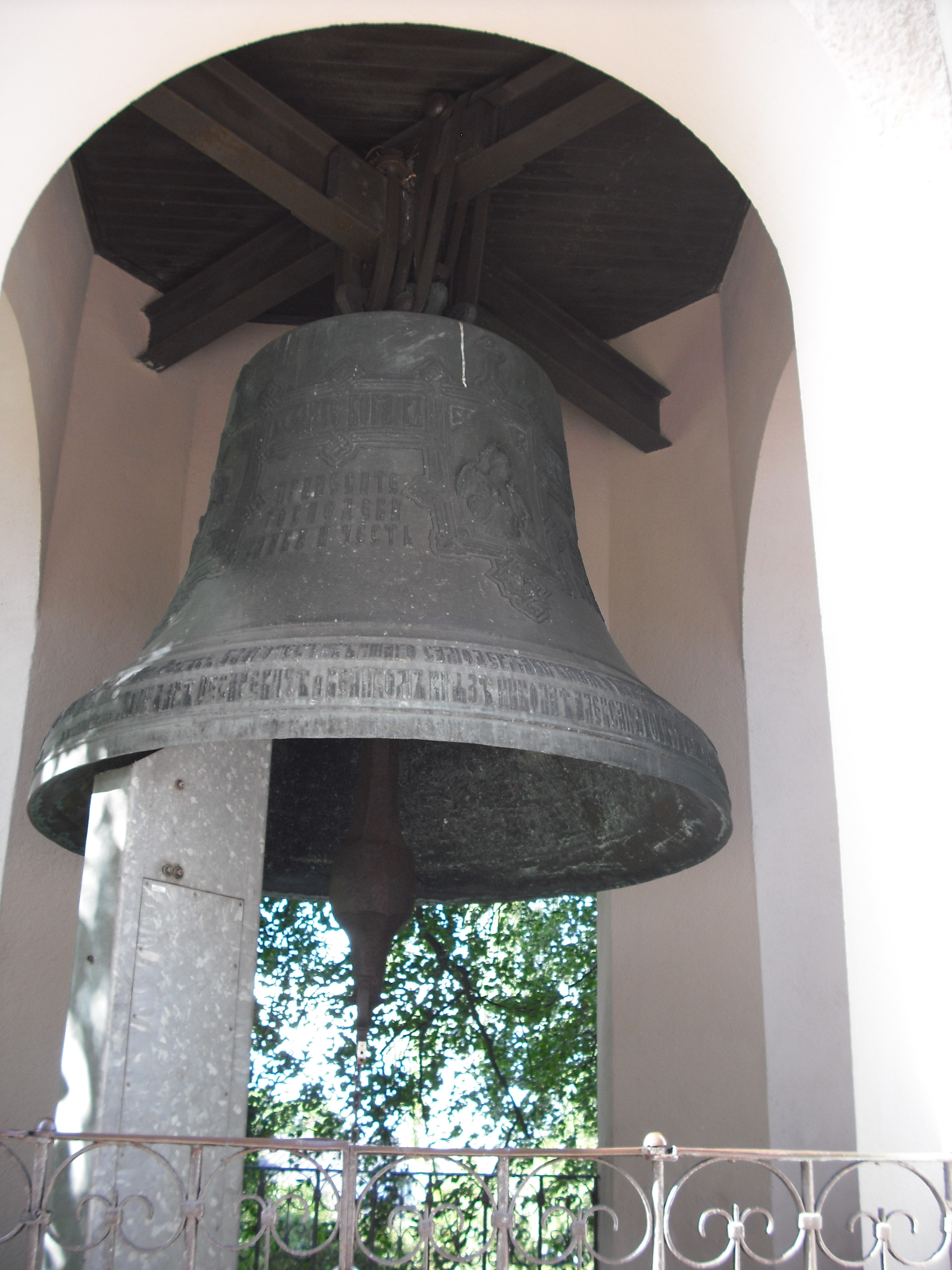
The bell

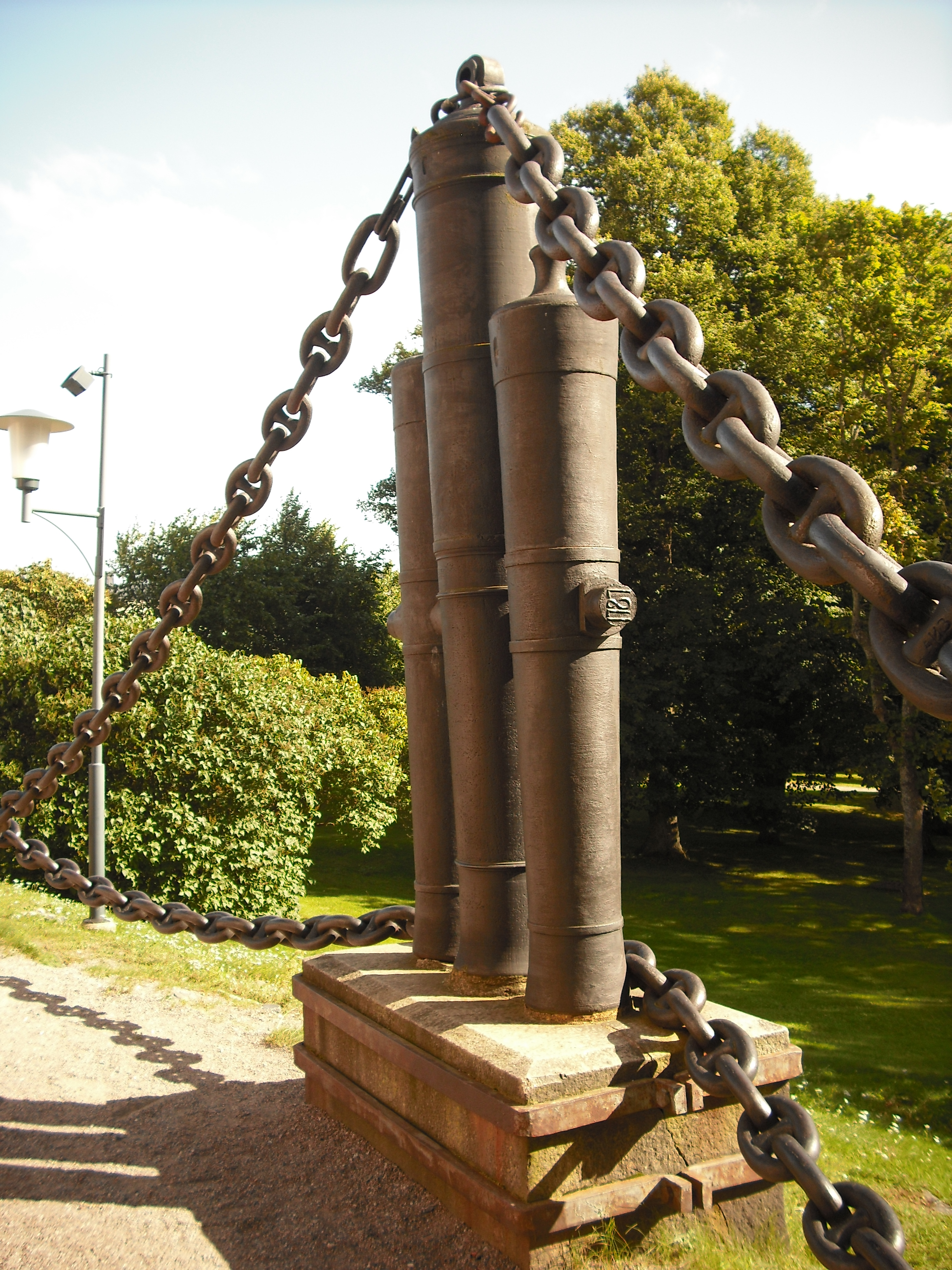
Fence constructed from cannon and chains

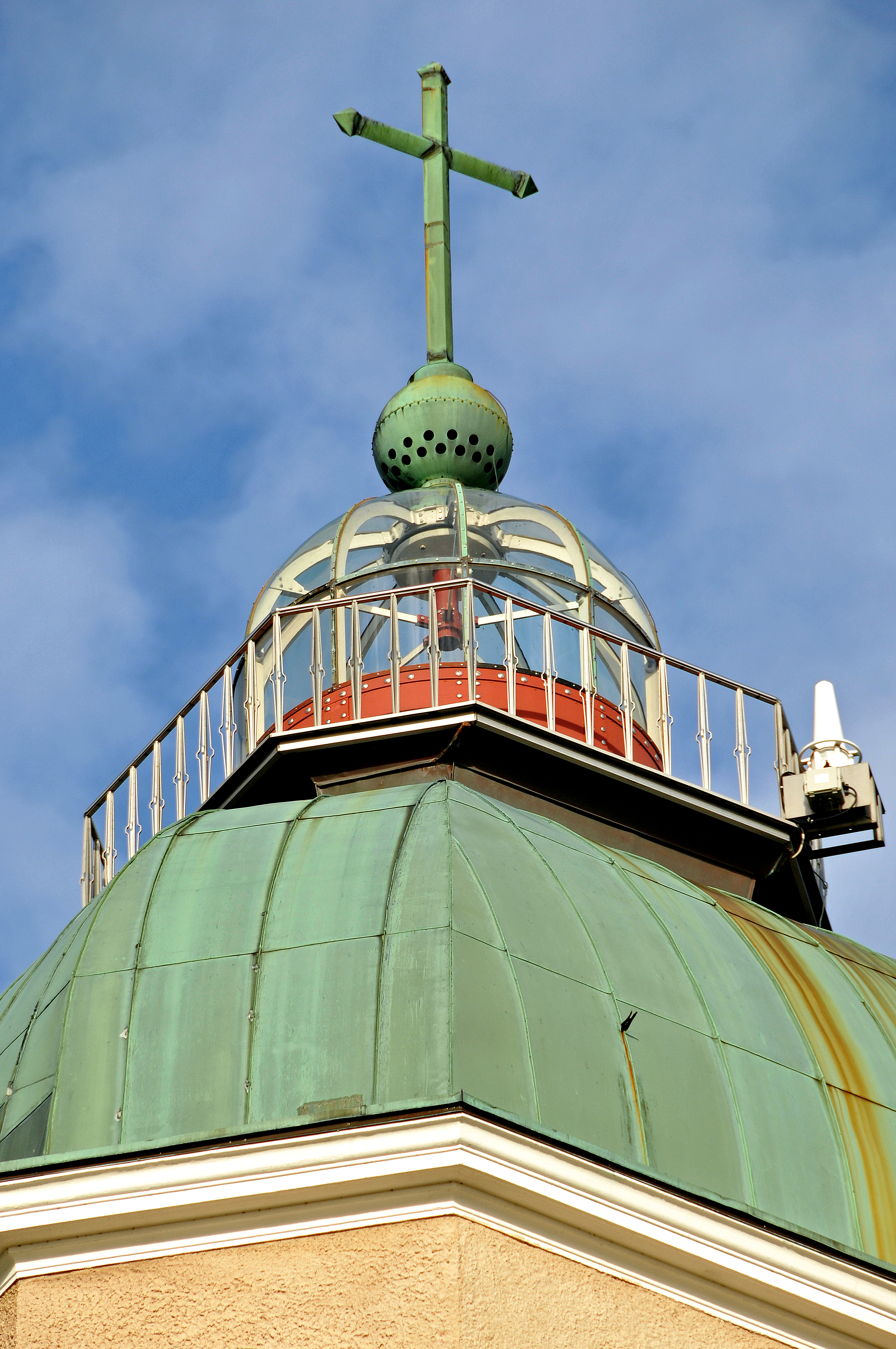
The lighthouse beacon
