= Fältmarskalk =

Field marshal Fältmarskalk
- Country: Sweden
- Service branch: Swedish Army
- Rank group: General officer
- Rank: Five-star rank
- NATO rank code: OF-10
- Formation: Late 16th century
- Abolished: 1972
- Next higher rank: None
- Next lower rank: General

Fältmarskalk (English: field marshal; sometimes generalfältmarskalk, English: general field marshal, equivalent to German Generalfeldmarschall) was a Swedish military rank equivalent to present-day NATO OF-10.

The rank of field marshal, the highest in the Swedish Army, was used from the late 16th century. The last appointment was made in 1824, after which the rank was reserved for wartime use until it was discontinued in 1972. Sweden had a total of 77 field marshals.

== See also ==
- List of Swedish field marshals
- Field marshal (Finland)
- Generalissimo
- Supreme Commander of the Swedish Armed Forces
