= Claes Cronstedt =

Swedish lawyer

Claes Cronstedt (born 1943 in Stockholm, Sweden) is a Swedish international lawyer and a member of the Swedish Bar Association. He is recognized as a pioneer in the field of Business and Human Rights and has contributed to several international legal initiatives in this area.

== Biography ==
Cronstedt earned his law degree in Sweden before beginning his legal career in international corporate law. He joined the law firm Baker & McKenzie, where he became an international partner. During his tenure, he chaired boards and provided legal counsel to companies including Teradyne Scandinavia Inc., TNT Sverige AB, Compaq Computer AB, Adobe Systems Nordic AB, Lear Corporation Sweden AB, and Novell Svenska AB.

Cronstedt led the Corporate Practice Group in the Stockholm office and oversaw mergers and acquisitions. He founded the Stockholm Corporate Social Responsibility (CSR) Practice Group and served as arbitrator and counsel in international arbitration cases. He was involved in international human rights litigation, notably the Raoul Wallenberg case against the USSR.

Over more than three decades in practice, Cronstedt became known for blending corporate legal expertise with human rights advocacy, advocating for responsible business conduct globally.

From 2001 to 2014, Cronstedt was a member of the working group of experts of the Council of Bars and Law Societies of Europe (CCBE), which publishes guidelines for European lawyers on advising regarding corporate social responsibility. He co-founded and served on the advisory board of the Swedish Amnesty International Business Group and, since 2003, has been a member of the Geneva International Committee of Human Rights Watch. Between 2001 and 2004, he was a member of the Swedish Committee of the ICC Commission on Business in Society, contributing to the drafting of a Guidebook on Responsible Business Conduct. He also served as a trustee of International Alert (1999–2006) and was part of the International Commission of Jurists’ Expert Legal Panel on Corporate Complicity in International Crimes (2006–2009). Since 2009, he has been involved with Gaemo Group International, a think tank focused on corporate responsibility.

Cronstedt founded the Raoul Wallenberg Academy for Young Leaders (1999–2004) and chaired The Non-Violence Project (2003–2015), which combats youth violence. He held positions on the boards of the Stockholm Bar Association, the Swedish Federation of Service Industries, and the Swedish Marine Industries Federation (SWEBOAT). He was Vice Commodore and Honorary Secretary of the Royal Swedish Yacht Club from 1992 to 1998.

In 2013, he initiated a project to create an International Arbitration Tribunal on Business and Human Rights to provide accountability for business-related human rights abuses. He presented this proposal at the United Nations Annual Forum in Geneva in December 2014.

== Proposal of an International Arbitration Tribunal on Business and Human Rights ==
In response to gaps in global accountability mechanisms for corporate human rights abuses, Cronstedt developed and promoted a proposal for a dedicated arbitration tribunal. This initiative seeks to offer victims of business-related human rights violations faster and more effective access to justice than traditional national court systems, which are often overburdened and limited in cross-border jurisdiction.

The following individuals have provided advice on the proposal of an International Arbitration Tribunal on Business and Human Rights:

- Yousuf Aftab, Principal, Enodo Rights
- Roger P. Alford, Professor of Law, Notre Dame Law School
- Ian Binnie, former Justice of the Supreme Court of Canada
- William Bourdon, Avocat, Paris
- Douglass Cassel, Notre Dame Presidential Fellow and Professor of Law
- Gabriela Quijano, Amnesty International Legal Adviser
- Steven R. Ratner, University of Michigan Law School

== Other Work and Recognition ==
Cronstedt has participated in podcasts and panels discussing the challenges businesses pose to human rights and has been featured by the Institute for Human Rights and Business (IHRB) for his contributions to arbitration mechanisms for dispute resolution.
