= Barkarö =

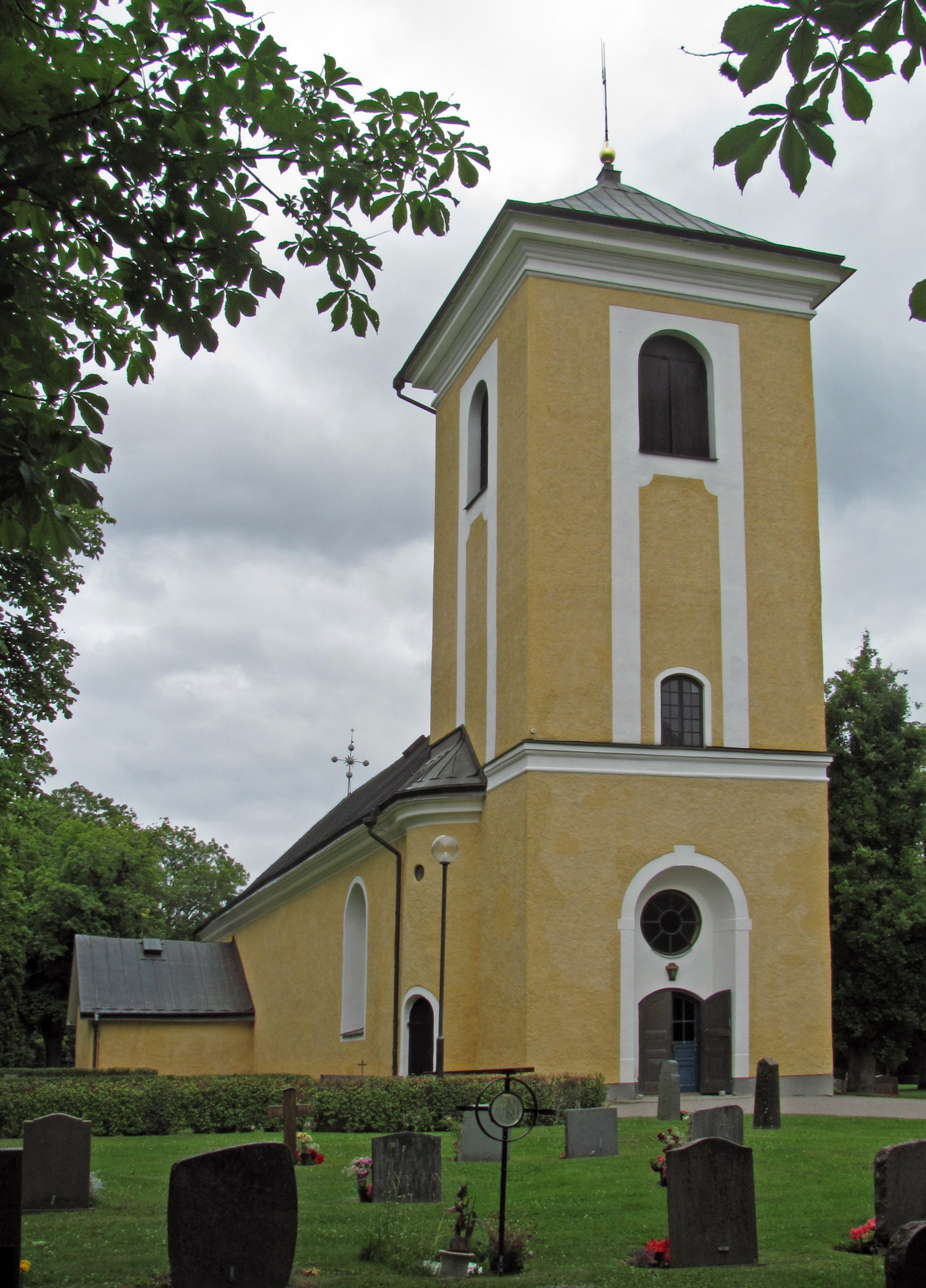
- Västerås-Barkarö Church in Barkarö

- Location within Västmanland Location within Sweden
- Coordinates: 59°33′N 16°30′E
- Country: Sweden
- Province: Västmanland
- County: Västmanland County
- Municipality: Västerås Municipality

Area
  - Total: 0.85 km^{2} (0.33 sq mi)

Population (31 December 2010)
  - Total: 1,163
  - Density: 1,366/km^{2} (3,540/sq mi)
- Time zone: UTC+1 (CET)
  - Summer (DST): UTC+2 (CEST)

Barkarö is a locality situated in Västerås Municipality, Västmanland County, Sweden with 1,163 inhabitants in 2010.

== History ==
The Västerås-Barkarö parish had its origins in the Middle Ages but its name didn’t become Västerås-Barkarö until 1889. Its church probably dates to the turn of the 13th century. A fire in 1771 destroyed the church and it also devastated many of the buildings in its vicinity.

The Västerås-Barkarö parish was in operation until the Swedish Municipal Reform of 1862. This was when its responsibilities were split between the new civic government of Barkarö Municipality and the church congregation. The municipality was in 1952 incorporated into Dingtuna Municipality, which in turn became a part of the town of Västerås in 1967. The town became Västerås Municipality in 1971. The church congregation is today known as the Västerås-Barkarö Congregation.

== Things to Do and See ==
The locality mostly consists of residential areas with the yellow stone church on its southern outskirts. It has good transport connections to the nearby city of Västerås and has Lake Mälaren both to the south and to the east. The lake is the third largest in Sweden.
