= Suomenlinna =

Sea fortress by Helsinki, Finland

Suomenlinna Sveaborg
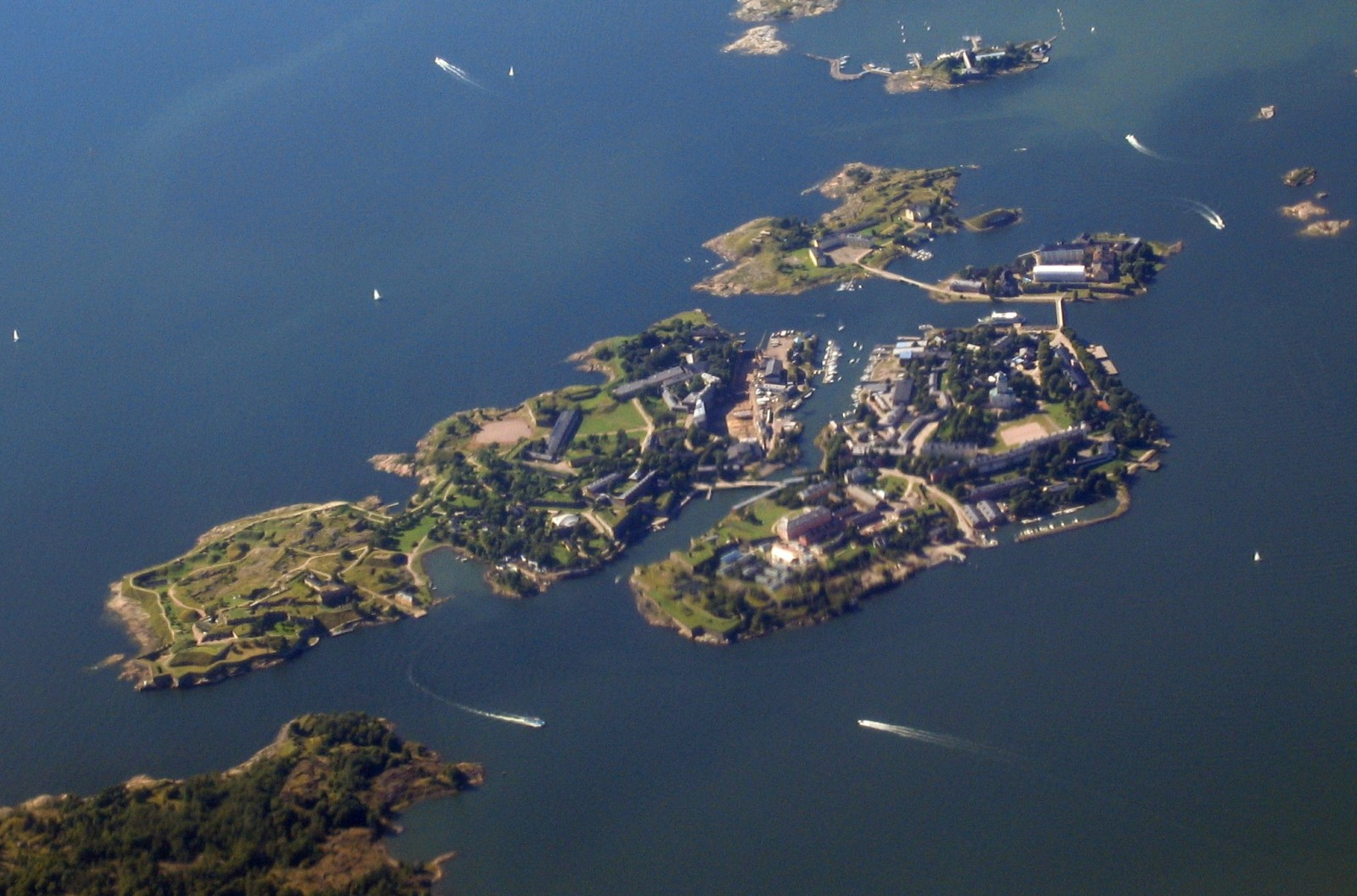
- An aerial view of Suomenlinna
- Interactive map of Suomenlinna; Sveaborg
- 60°08′37″N 24°59′04″E
- Location: Helsinki, Finland

UNESCO World Heritage Site
- Official name: Fortress of Suomenlinna
- Type: Cultural
- Criteria: iv
- Designated: 1991 (15th session)
- Reference no.: 583
- Region: Europe and North America

Suomenlinna (Finnish: [ˈsuo̯menˌlinːɑ]), or Sveaborg (Swedish: [ˈsvɛːɑˈborj]), is a sea fortress composed of eight islands, of which six have been fortified. Located about four kilometres (2.5 mi) southeast of the city center of Helsinki, Finland, Suomenlinna is a popular destination for both tourists and locals, who enjoy it as a picturesque picnic site.

Construction of the fortress began in 1748 under the Swedish Crown as a defense against Russia. The general responsibility for the fortification work was given to Admiral Augustin Ehrensvärd. The original plan of the bastion fortress was heavily influenced by Vauban, a renowned French military engineer, and incorporated the principles of the star fort style of fortifications, albeit adapted to a group of rocky islands.

During the Finnish War, Russian forces besieged the fortress in 1808. Despite its formidable reputation as the "Gibraltar of the North", the fortress surrendered after only two months, on 3 May 1808. Its loss paved the way for Russia's seizure of Finland in 1809, and the subsequent establishment of the Grand Duchy of Finland, an autonomous state within the Russian Empire.

Under Russian rule, the fortress served as a base for the Baltic Fleet during World War I, and in 1915, construction began on the Krepost Sveaborg defense system. Russian forces abandoned the fortress after Finland declared independence in 1917. Originally named Sveaborg ("Fortress of Sweden") and known as Viapori ([ˈviaˌpori]) in Finnish, it was renamed Suomenlinna ("Fortress of Finland") in 1918. In Swedish, however, it retains its original name. In the aftermath of the Finnish Civil War, the islands housed the Suomenlinna prison camp for captured Red soldiers.

Suomenlinna remained under the control of the Finnish Defense Department until 1973, when most of it was transferred to civilian administration. Famous for its bastion fortifications, the fortress was designated a UNESCO World Heritage Site in 1991.

== Geography ==
City map of Suomenlinna. The areas shaded red are military areas off-limits to the general public.

The Suomenlinna district of Helsinki lies southeast of downtown Helsinki and consists of eight islands. Five of the islands are connected by either bridges or a sandbar landbridge. Länsi-Mustasaari (Västersvartö) is bridged to Pikku Mustasaari (Lilla Östersvartö), which is bridged to Iso Mustasaari (Stora Östersvartö), which, in turn, is bridged to Susisaari (Vargö). Susisaari was connected to Susiluoto (Vargskär) by filling in the separating waterway during the Russian period. This island, which has the greatest concentration of fortifications was renamed Gustavssvärd (Kustaanmiekka, meaning "Gustav's sword") during the construction by Sweden. The three unconnected islands are Särkkä (Långören), Lonna (Lonnan), and Pormestarinluodot (Borgmästargrundet). The total land area of the district is 80 hectares (0.80 square kilometres; 0.31 square miles).

Instead of following the standard Finnish postal addressing system, which uses a street name and house number, addresses in Suomenlinna use a letter code for the island followed by a house number. For instance, "C 83" refers to house number 83 on Iso-Mustasaari (designated by the letter "C"). The postal code for the Suomenlinna district is 00190.

Most of the island of Pikku Mustasaari consists of the Naval Academy of Finland, an institution under the Finnish Defence Forces. The civilian area on the island is mostly limited to one street on the south-eastern coast of the island, connecting it to the neighbouring islands of Iso Mustasaari and Länsi-Mustasaari.

== History ==
=== Swedish era ===
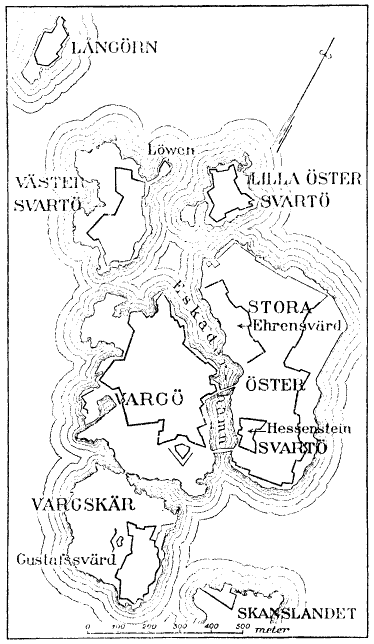
Map of Sveaborg in the 1790s

==== Background ====
Early on in the Great Northern War, Russia took advantage of Swedish weakness in Ingria (sv: Ingermanland) and captured the area near the Neva River as well as the Swedish forts, Nyen and Nöteborg, built to protect it. In 1703, Peter the Great founded his new capital, Saint Petersburg, in that easternmost corner of the Gulf of Finland. In the approach to it he built the fortified naval base of Kronstadt. Russia soon became a maritime power and a force to be reckoned with in the Baltic Sea. The situation posed a threat to Sweden, which until that time had been the dominant power in the Baltic. This was visibly demonstrated by the use of naval forces in the Russian capture of Viborg in 1710. The main Swedish naval base at Karlskrona was too far to the south to meet Sweden's new needs for its navy in the 18th century, which often resulted in Swedish ships reaching the coast of Finland only after Russian ships and troops had either started or completed their spring campaigns.

The lack of coastal defenses was keenly felt with Russian landings in Helsingfors in the spring of 1713 and the Swedish failure to blockade the Hanko Peninsula in 1714. A Russian naval campaign against the Swedish coast towards the end of the Great Northern War further outlined the need to develop Finnish coastal defenses. Immediately after the war ended the first plans were set in motion in Sweden to construct an archipelago fleet and a base of operations for it in Finland. However, nothing with regard to Sveaborg took place until the end of Russo-Swedish War of 1741–1743. Fortifications were left unfinished at Hamina and Lappeenranta while Hämeenlinna was being built into a supply base. Lack of funds, unwillingness to devote funds for defending Finland, and the belief (arising just before the war) that Russia would be pushed away from the Baltic Sea were the main causes for the lack of progress.

The following Russo-Swedish War of 1741–1743, which quickly turned from a Swedish attack into a Russian invasion of Finland, again underlined the importance of developing fortifications in Finland. Lack of base of operations for naval forces made it difficult for the Swedish navy to operate in the area. Other European states were also concerned about developments regarding Russia, especially France, with whom Sweden had concluded a military alliance. After lengthy debate, the Swedish parliament decided in 1747 to both fortify the Russian frontier and establish a naval base at Helsingfors as a counter to Kronstadt. Augustin Ehrensvärd (1710–1772), a young lieutenant colonel, was given the responsibility of designing the fortresses and directing construction operations. He was assisted by Fabian Casimir Wrede in his task.

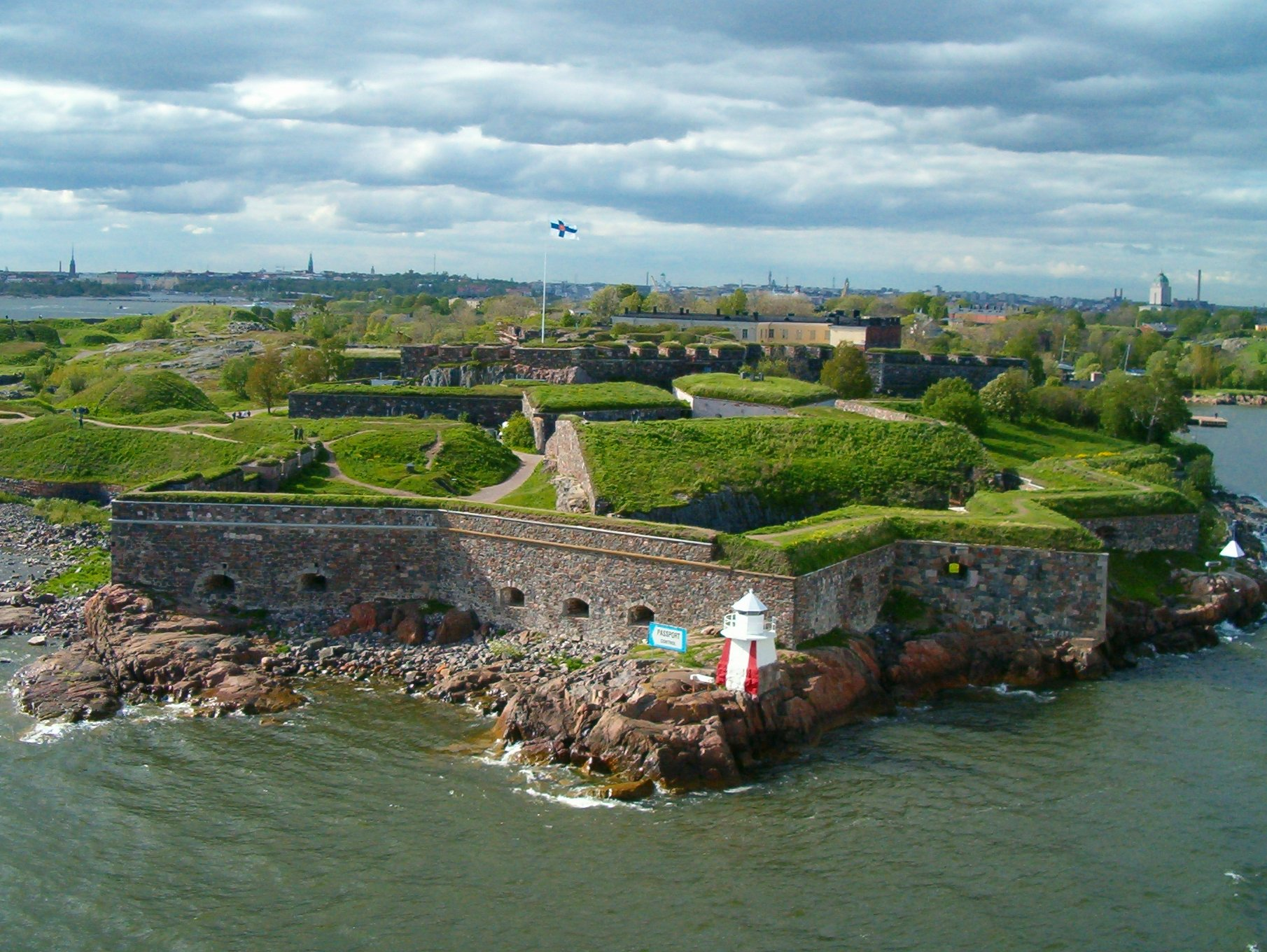
Bastion Zander

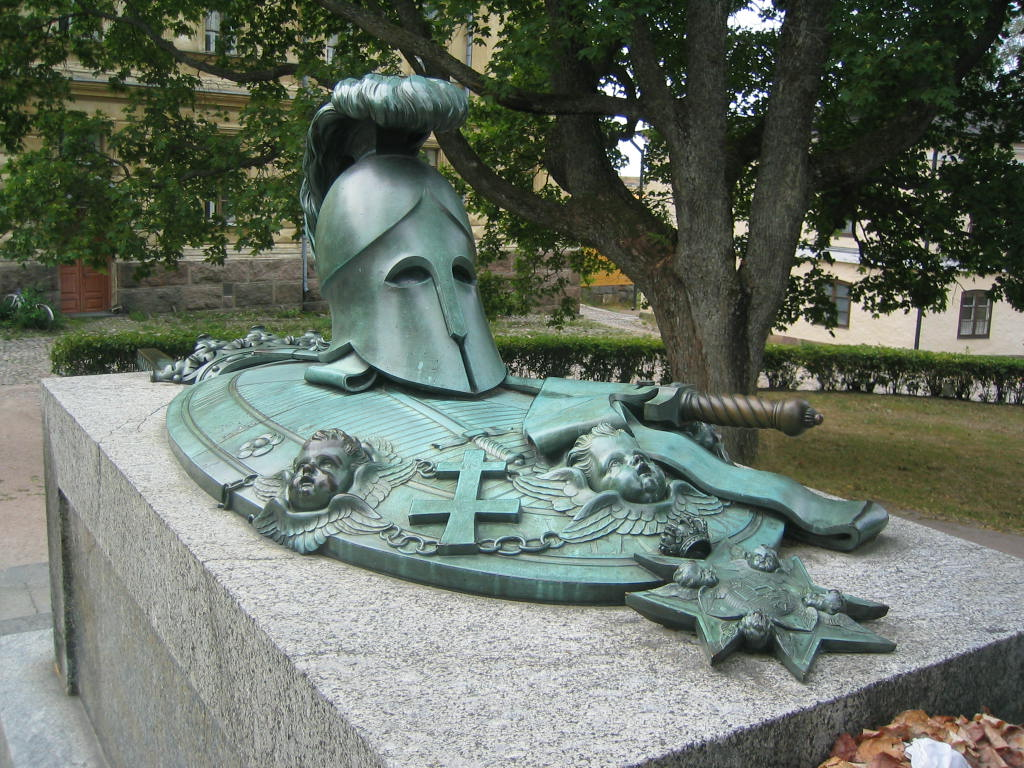
Augustin Ehrensvärd's grave at Suomenlinna

==== Construction ====
Sweden started building the fortresses in January 1748. Ehrensvärd's plan contained two fortifications: a sea fortress at Svartholm near the small town of Lovisa, and a larger sea fortress and naval base (Sveaborg) at Helsingfors. There were two main aspects to Ehrensvärd's design for Sveaborg: a series of independent fortifications across several linked islands and, at the very heart of the complex, a navy dockyard. In addition to the island fortress itself, seafacing fortifications on the mainland would ensure that an enemy could not acquire a beach-head from which to stage attacks on the sea fort. The plan was also to stock munitions for the whole Finnish contingent of the Swedish Army and Royal Swedish Navy there. Additional plans were made for fortifying the Hanko Peninsula, but these were postponed.

Construction started in early 1748 kept expanding, and by September there were around 2,500 men building the fortresses. Initially the soldiers were housed in the vaults of the fortifications, while the officers had specially built quarters integrated into the baroque cityscape composition of the overall plan. The most ambitious plan was left only half completed: a baroque square on Iso Mustasaari partly based on the model of Place Vendôme in Paris. As the construction work progressed, more residential buildings were built, many following the shape of the fortification lines. Ehrensvärd and some of the other officers were keen artists who made oil paintings presenting a view of life in the fortress during its construction, and giving the impression of a lively "fortress town" community.

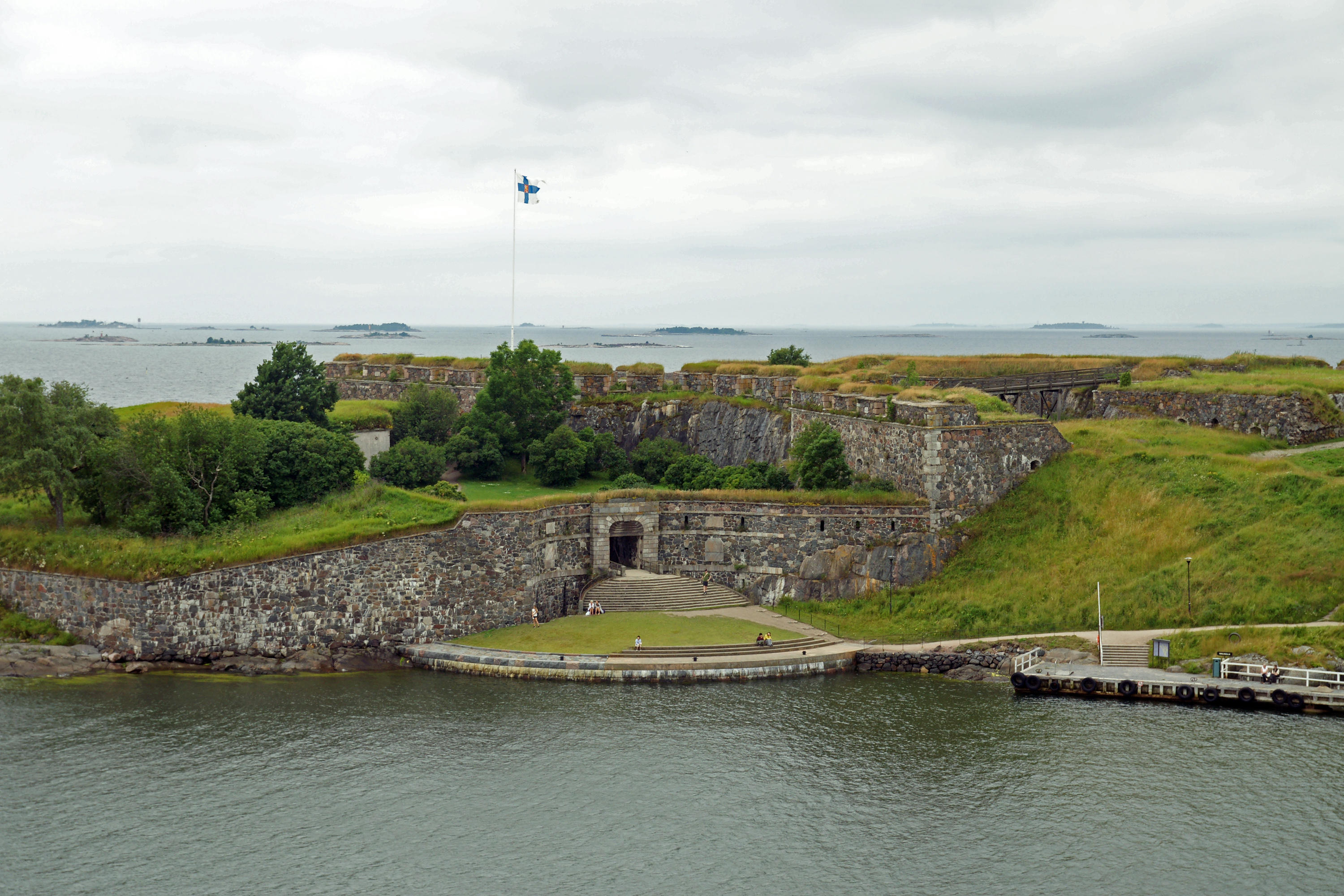
Kuninkaanportti, The King's Gate

Due to repeated Russian threats in 1749 and 1750, more effort was placed on the island fortifications at the expense of those on the mainland, so that a safe base of operations could be secured for the Swedish naval units along the Finnish coast. Using the military garrisoned in Finland as the workforce, construction continued with over 6,000 workers in 1750. Fortifications at Gustavssvärd were completed in 1751 and the main fortifications on Vargö were ready in 1754. The fortress was fully operational though unfinished. These accomplishments did not reduce the pace of construction and in 1755 there were 7,000 workers constructing the fortifications outside of Helsingfors which at the time had around 2,000 residents. The substantial fortification work on the islands south of the town brought it a new and unexpected importance. Swedish participation to the Seven Years' War halted the construction efforts in 1757, which also marked the end of the rapid construction phase of Sveaborg.

This period in Swedish history was known as the Age of Liberty, during which the kingdom was under increased parliamentary control, divided into two political parties, the Hats and the Caps. Ehrensvärd had been supported by the Hats, so when the Caps rose to power in 1766 he was relieved of his post and replaced with ardent Caps supporter Christopher Falkengréen. However, after 1769 when the Hats regained power, Ehrensvärd was again placed in command of the Swedish archipelago fleet in Finland, officially the arméens flotta ("fleet of the army"), and returned to Sveaborg. But additional progress had not been made on the fortifications when Ehrensvärd died in 1772. Efforts to improve the fortress continued under Jacob Magnus Sprengtporten, but his tenure was cut short by disagreements with King Gustav III. Once again efforts slowed down as garrisons were reduced, and in 1776 Sveaborg's commander reported that he could not even man one-tenth of the artillery placed in the fort. Even at the start of the Russo-Swedish War in 1788 Sveaborg remained in an incomplete state.

Facilities for constructing ships for the Swedish archipelago fleet were built at Sveaborg in the 1760s. In 1764 the first three archipelago frigates were launched from there. In addition to the construction of the fortifications and ships, naval officer training was started by Ehrensvärd at his own expense at Sveaborg in 1770. It took until 1779 before a naval military school was formally founded there.

==== Service ====
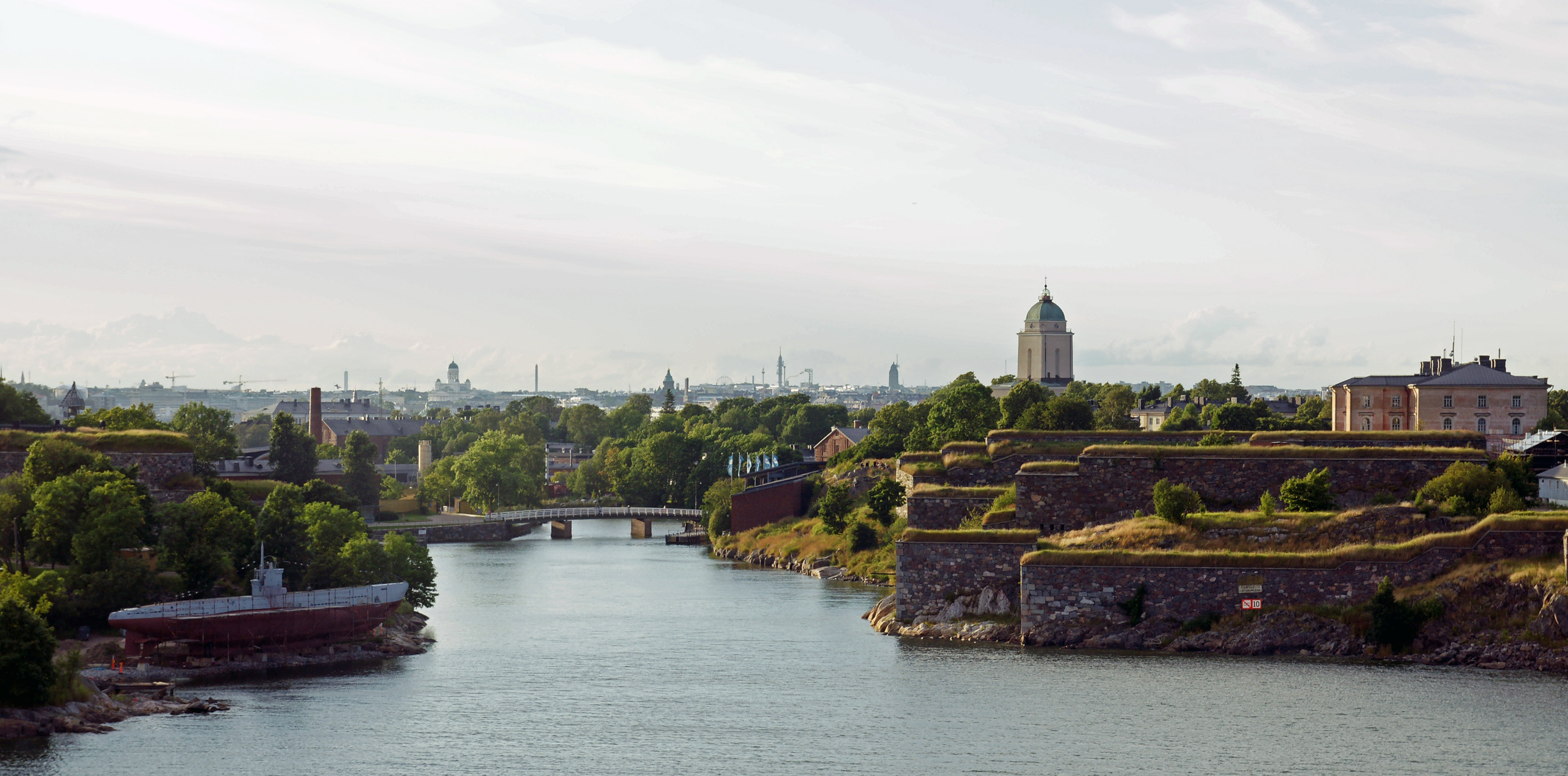
Suomenlinna seen from the sea

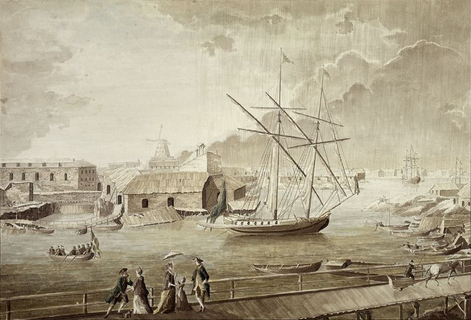
A pojama flying the blue naval ensign of the Swedish archipelago fleet in Artilleriviken (Tykistölahti); painting by Adolf Geete, 1760

Sveaborg was formed and stocked according to the needs of the Swedish archipelago fleet and thus was unable to repair and refit the Swedish battlefleet after the battle of Hogland. Facilities were also found lacking at Sveaborg, especially in the areas intended for taking care of the sick and wounded. Russian control of the waters outside of Sveaborg practically blockaded the Swedish battlefleet to Sveaborg. By cutting the coastal sea route past Hangö, Russians prevented supplies from being shipped from Sweden to Sveaborg. The Swedish fleet finally managed to set sail for its base at Karlskrona on 20 November when the Baltic Sea had already frozen severely enough that ice had to be sawed open before some ships could move. The fleet could not overwinter at Sveaborg since it lacked the facilities and supplies for fitting the ships.

While the route to Sweden was open again in late 1788 and in early 1789, Russian ships cut the connection from Sveaborg to Sweden by forming a blockade at Porkkala cape. Sveaborg was the most important location for archipelago fleet's ship construction and fitting during the war. Even so, and despite efforts, several ships remained unfinished at Sveaborg until the end of the war. The importance of Sveaborg did not escape the Russians whose broad operational plan for 1790 included a siege of Sveaborg both from sea and land.

Following a pact between Alexander I and Napoleon, Russia launched a campaign against Sweden and seized Finland in 1808. The Russians easily took Helsingfors in early 1808 and began bombarding the fortress. Its commander, Carl Olof Cronstedt, negotiated a cease-fire. When no Swedish reinforcements had arrived by May, Sveaborg, with almost 7,000 men, surrendered. The reasons for Cronstedt's actions remain somewhat unclear; but the hopeless situation, psychological warfare by the Russians, some (possibly) bribed advisors, fear for the lives of a large civilian population, lack of gunpowder, and their physical isolation are some likely causes for the surrender. By the Treaty of Fredrikshamn in 1809, Sweden ceded its eastern territory of Finland and the Grand Duchy of Finland was established within the Russian Empire. The Swedish period in Finnish history, which had lasted some seven centuries, came to an end. As of 2024, nine wrecks were known to be in the vicinity, possibly part of the fleet at the fortress. At the time of the surrender in 1808, more than 100 ships changed nationality.

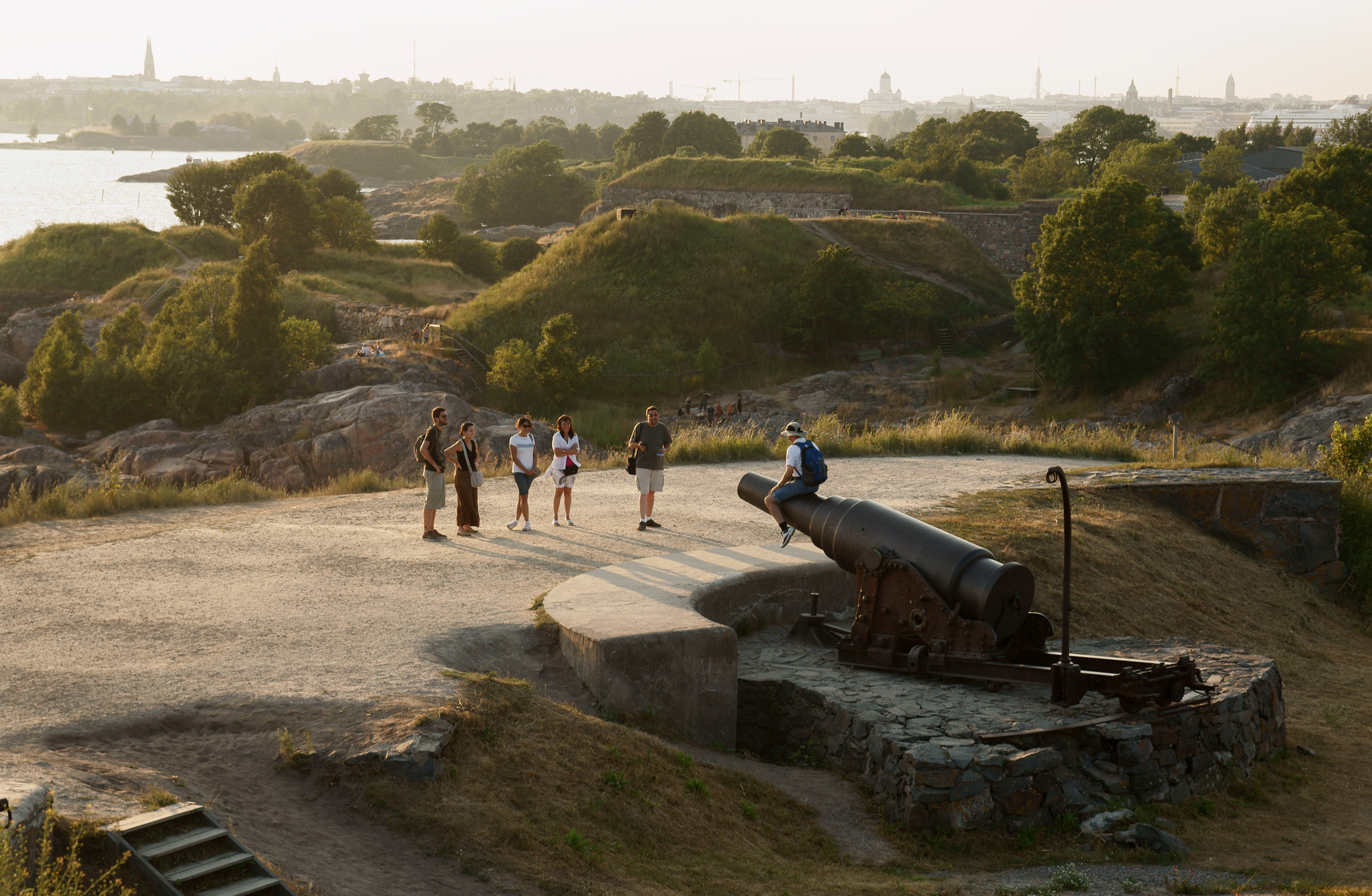
Naval guns of Suomenlinna

=== Under Russian rule ===
After taking over the fortress, the Russians started an extensive building program, mostly extra barracks, and extended the dockyard and reinforced the fortification lines. The long period of peace following the transfer of power was shattered by the Crimean War of 1853–56. The French–British–Ottoman alliance decided to engage Russia on two fronts and sent an Anglo-French fleet to the Baltic Sea. For two summers during the Åland War the fleet shelled the towns and fortifications along the Finnish coast. The bombardment of Sveaborg (also known then as Viapori) by the forces of Richard Saunders Dundas and Charles Pénaud on 9–10 August 1855 lasted 47 hours and the fortress was badly damaged, but they were unable to knock out the Russian guns. After the bombardment, the Anglo-French fleet sent no troops ashore and instead set sail for Kronstadt.

After the Crimean War extensive restoration work was begun at Sveaborg. A new ring of earthworks with artillery emplacements was built at the western and southern edges of the islands.

The next stage in the arming of Sveaborg and the Gulf of Finland came in the build-up to World War I. The fortress and its surrounding islands became part of "Peter the Great's naval fortification" designed to safeguard the capital, Saint Petersburg.

=== Finnish ownership ===
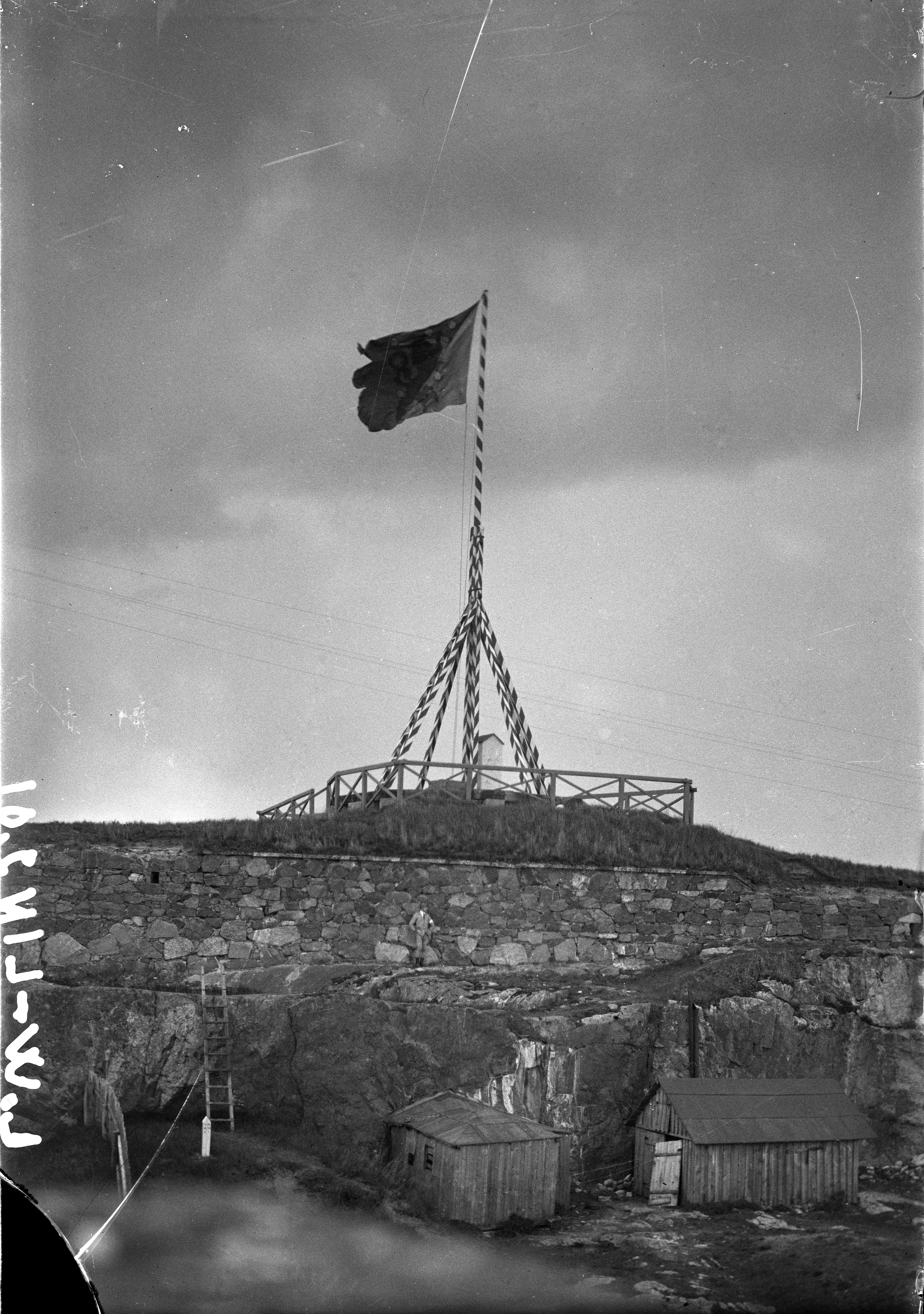
The red-yellow lion flag of Finland was raised in Suomenlinna in early April 1918 to mark the fortress's capture.

Following the Russian Revolution in 1917, Finland declared independence, but Sveaborg remained under the control of Russian military forces. During the Finnish Civil War, they handed part of it over to the Finnish Red Guards in March 1918. The Whites captured the fortress with the support of German forces in early April. Sveaborg received its current name, Suomenlinna ("Castle of Finland"), on May 12, 1918, when the red-yellow lion flag—used temporarily as Finland's national flag—was ceremoniously raised on the flagpole of Gustavssvärd, and eight salutes were fired from two Russian field cannons. The flag-raising ceremony was attended by distinguished guests, including members of the Senate, the city council, and several high-ranking military officers. The name change of the fortress was proposed by Senator Kyösti Kallio.

In 1918 and 1919, the islands housed a large prison camp in the aftermath of the civil war. Of the 10,000 Red Guard prisoners held at the Suomenlinna prison camp, over 1,000 died of hunger and disease. Eighty prisoners were executed.

After the civil war, the fortress functioned as a Finnish garrison. A coastal artillery regiment, the Naval Academy, and a base for the mine-sweeping fleet were stationed on the islands. There were small-scale restoration efforts, and interest in the fortress as a tourist destination started to grow. During the Winter War in 1939–1940, Suomenlinna housed anti-aircraft and artillery units and served as a base for the submarine fleet. During the Continuation War, German military forces were stationed in Suomenlinna. The fortress sustained damage from bombings.

After the war, the Valmet Shipyard at Suomenlinna built barges and trawlers as war reparations. It also constructed vessels for the Finnish Navy and Coast Guard, and repaired ships. For the 200th anniversary of the fortress in 1948, the courtyard of Susisaari (Vargö) Castle and Kustaanmiekka (Gustavssvärd) were restored.

No longer very practical as a military base, Suomenlinna was turned over to civilian administration in 1973. An independent government department, the Governing Body of Suomenlinna, was formed to administer the unique complex. At the time there was some debate over its Finnish name, with some suggesting that the old name Viapori be restored, but the newer name was retained. The presence of the military on the islands has been drastically scaled down in recent decades. The Suomenlinna garrison houses the Naval Academy (Finnish: Merisotakoulu) of the Finnish Navy on Pikku Mustasaari. Suomenlinna still flies the war flag, or the swallow-tailed state flag of Finland.

== Present day ==
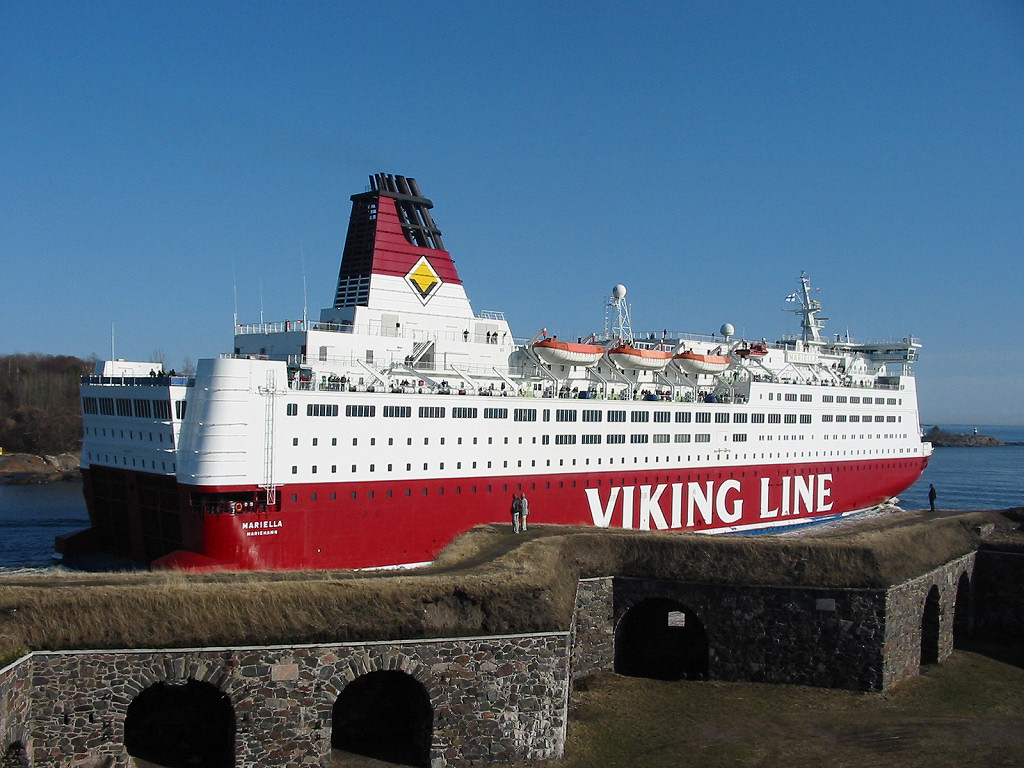
M/S Mariella passing through the Kustaanmiekka strait after leaving Helsinki for Stockholm

Today, Suomenlinna is both a historic sea fortress and a district of Helsinki. About 800 people live on the islands, while approximately 400 people work there throughout the year, increasing to around 500 during the summer season. The district contains residential buildings as well as a school, daycare, church, library, grocery store, restaurants, cafés, artists' studios and other businesses and services. The Finnish Naval Academy is also located on Suomenlinna.

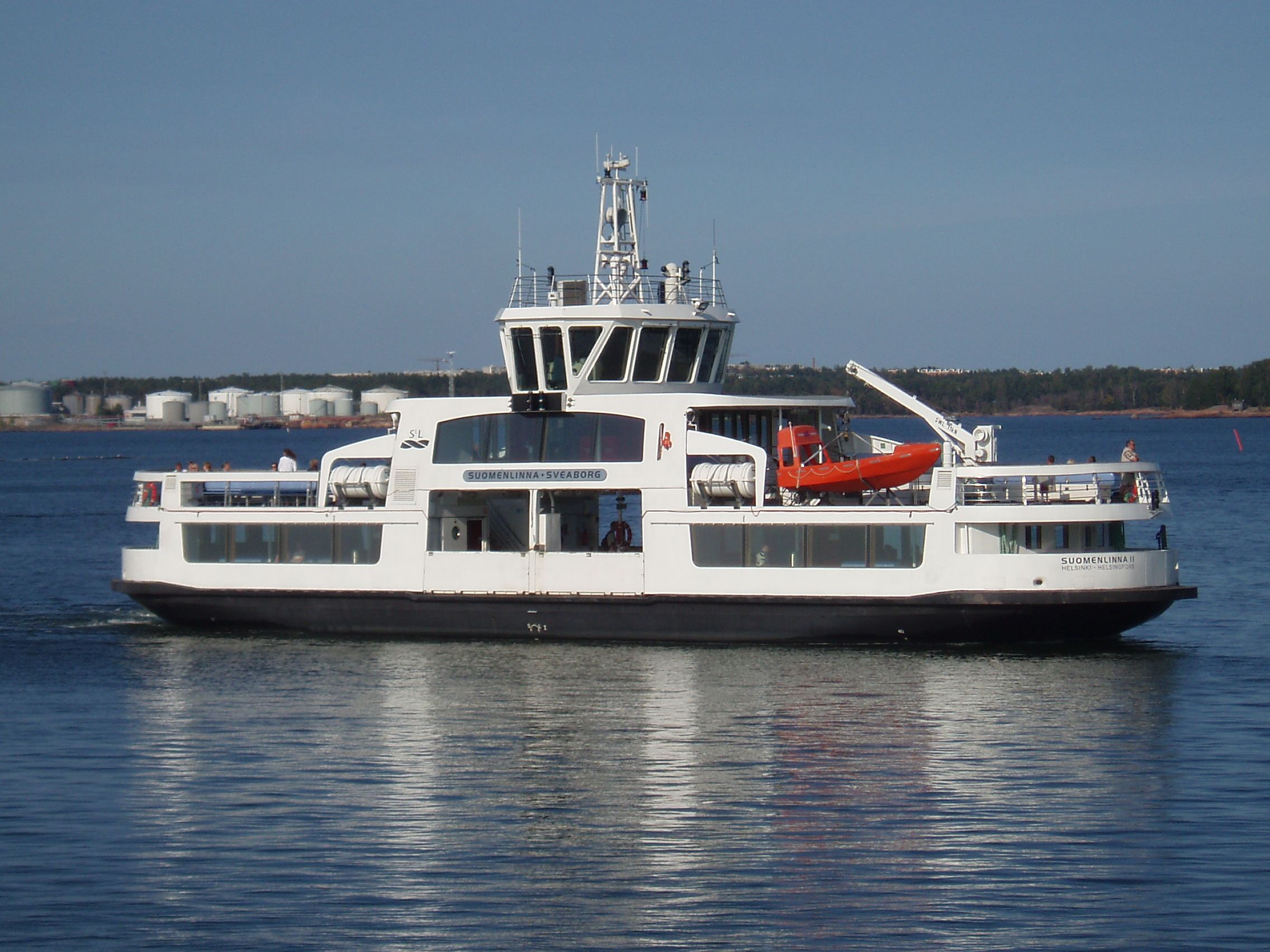
The M/S Suomenlinna II transports residents, tourists and vehicles to and from the harbor at Suomenlinna

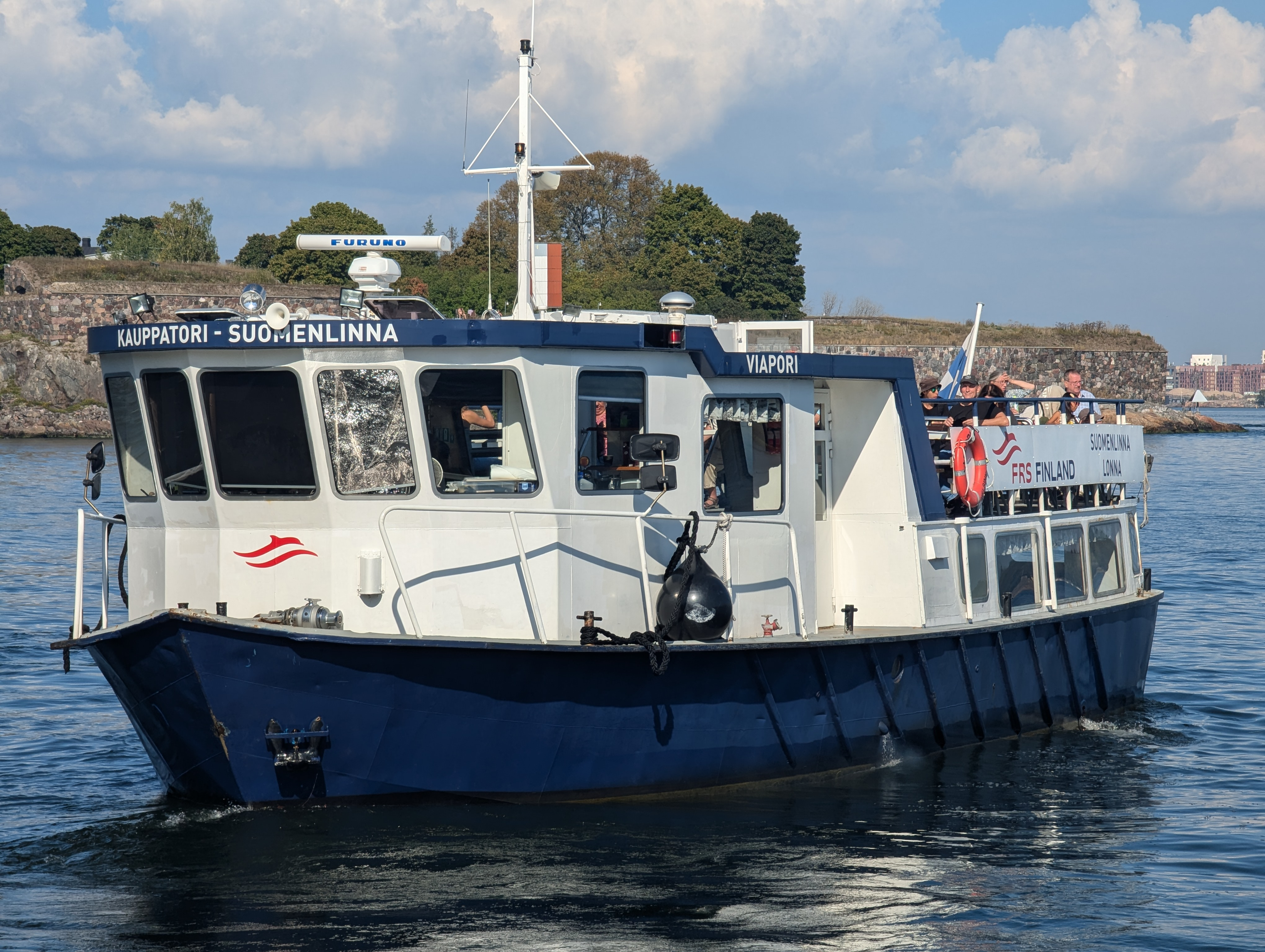
In summertime, Suomenlinna can also be reached on tour boats operated by a private shipping company.

There is a minimum-security penal labor colony (Finnish: työsiirtola) in Suomenlinna, whose inmates work on the maintenance and reconstruction of the fortifications. Only volunteer inmates who pledge non-use of controlled substances are accepted to the labour colony.

For the general public, Suomenlinna is served by ferries all year, and a service tunnel supplying heating, water and electricity was built in 1982. In the beginning of the 1990s, the tunnel was modified so that it can also be used for emergency transport.

Transport to and from the island is generally ceased between the hours of 0300 and 0600 daily, but is otherwise regular and frequent.

Suomenlinna has a long history as a centre for Nordic cultural cooperation. The Nordic Arts Centre (Nordiskt konstcentrum) operated on the island from 1978 to 1996, followed by the Nordic Institute for Contemporary Art. Today, Nordic Culture Point, the successor to these institutions, maintains premises on Suomenlinna and hosts cultural activities and artist residencies. The fortress continues to host exhibitions, concerts, performances, workshops and other events, including Viaporin Kekri, a contemporary celebration inspired by the Finnish kekri harvest tradition, and Viapori Jazz, an annual jazz festival held on the island.

The fortress contains several museums, including the Suomenlinna Museum, Ehrensvärd Museum, Customs Museum and Military Museum, as well as the Vesikko submarine. Vesikko, the only surviving Finnish submarine of its type, is preserved as part of the Military Museum and is its most popular attraction.

Suomenlinna is one of Finland's most popular tourist destinations, attracting approximately one million visitors annually, around two-thirds of whom come from abroad. Approximately 60% of visitors are classified as cultural tourists, visiting to learn about the history of the fortress, visit museums and galleries, attend theatre performances or participate in events.

The island houses a backpackers' hostel operating in a converted school building, built in 1908 and having served as a Russian school (1909–1917), military office (1918–1919), Finnish school (1920–1959), and a canteen and entertainment venue for soldiers (1959–1972).

Suomenlinna Church, built in 1854, was adapted in 1929 to include a lighthouse beacon. Both the church and beacon are still active today. The lighthouse beacon was modernised to use LED lighting in 2019.

== Timeline ==
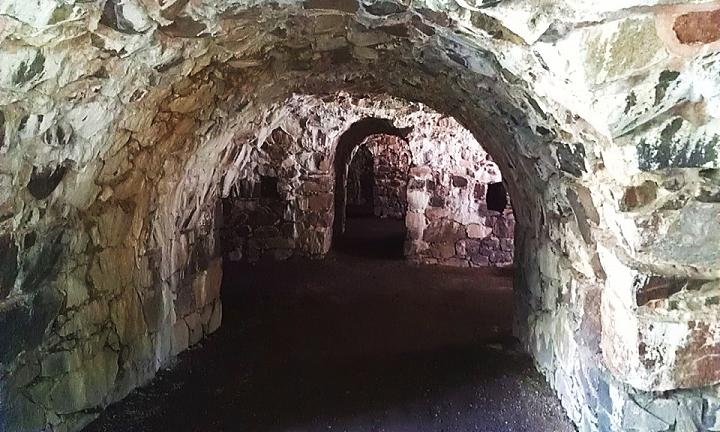
Tunnels at Suomenlinna

- 1748: Building of Sveaborg begins under command of Augustin Ehrensvärd.
- 1808: Sveaborg surrenders to Russia without any opposition during the Finnish War.
- 1809: Treaty of Fredrikshamn: Finland becomes part of Russia.
- 1855: Crimean War: Anglo–French navy bombards Sveaborg and causes substantial damage.
- 1906: Sveaborg Rebellion: Russian soldiers plan to depose the tsar.
- 1914–1917: A ring of ground and sea fortifications, called Krepost Sveaborg, is built around Helsinki.
- 1917: Finland becomes independent after the Russian Revolution.
- 1918: Name Suomenlinna becomes the official name of the fortress in Finnish. Prison camp of Red rebels is located in Suomenlinna after the Finnish Civil War.
- 1921 Valtion lentokonetehdas (State Aircraft Factory) started building airplanes and powered ice sleighs in Suomenlinna for the Finnish Air Force. In 1936 the factory moved to Tampere.
- 1973: Suomenlinna becomes civil administration area.
- 1991: Suomenlinna becomes a UNESCO World Heritage Site.

== In popular culture ==
The Swedish-speaking Finnish poet Johan Ludvig Runeberg wrote a poem called Sveaborg, one of the 35 short poems that together constitute his epic The Tales of Ensign Stål. It includes the following two verses about the fortress, which allude specifically to the "Gustav's Sword" (Gustavssvärd) bastion and its guns:

It looks out over sea and fjord,
With eyes of granite.
It raises its Gustav's sword high,
And proudly says: 'Come hither!'
This sword is not lowered to strike,
It only flashes and so destroys.

Do not let the island be defiantly approached
When the war comes.
Do not disturb the queen of the sea
In her moment of anger:
She slings messages of death toward you,
In the roar of a thousand cannons.

Sveaborg is also mentioned in the lyrics of Gunnar Wennerberg's 1849 hymn O Gud, som styrer folkens öden ("Oh God, who steers the people's fate"), in which Sweden's "age-old freedom" is described as being "...our protection in gloomy dangers, our consolation in every bleached sorrow, our defence against the hegemon's forces, and stronger than Sveaborg". As these words were written forty years after the Swedish cession of Finland to Russia, the use of Sveaborg as a simile has deliberately historic overtones.

George R. R. Martin wrote a short story about the surrender of Sveaborg, "The Fortress", when he was a college student. It was published in his 2007 volume of short stories, Dreamsongs.

The fortress was also the subject of the 1972 Finnish-Soviet historical film Sveaborg, directed by Sergei Kolosov and based on a novel by Nikolai Semenkewitsch. The film depicts the 1906 Sveaborg mutiny, when soldiers and sailors of the Russian garrison rebelled against their officers. The 2017 Finnish war film Unknown Soldier, directed by Aku Louhimies, was partly filmed at Suomenlinna, which was used to represent locations in the Soviet Union.

The music video for Nightwish's 2001 single “Over the Hills and Far Away” was partly filmed at Suomenlinna, including around the King's Gate. Directed by Pasi Takula, the video uses the fortress's historic setting to create a medieval atmosphere.

== Notable people ==
- Nikolai Mikhailovich Knipovich (1862–1939), ichthyologist, marine zoologist and oceanographer

== See also ==
- Battle of Suomenlinna
- Krepost Sveaborg
- List of castles in Finland
- List of fortifications
- Military Museum's Manege
- Suomenlinna church
- Suomenlinna prison
- Walhalla-orden

== Sources ==
=== Bibliography ===
- Mattila, Tapani (1983). Meri maamme turvana [Sea safeguarding our country] (in Finnish). Jyväskylä: K. J. Gummerus Osakeyhtiö. ISBN 951-99487-0-8.
