= Battle of Fredrikshamn =

Part of the Russo-Swedish War (1788–1790)

Coordinates: 60.52°N 27.18°E

- Part of the Russo-Swedish War (1788–90)
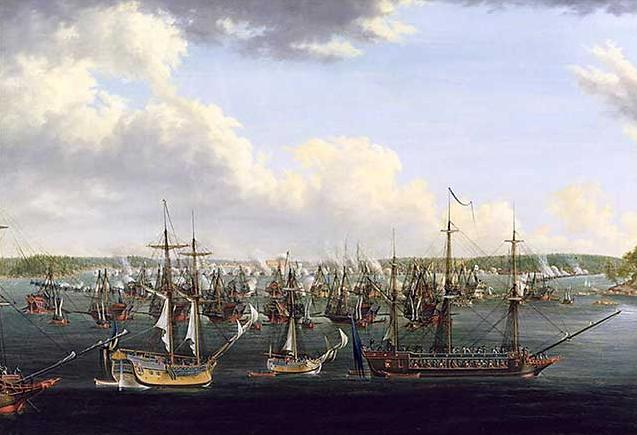
- Battle of Fredrikshamn 15 May 1790
Date	May 15, 1790
Location	Fredrikshamn, Russian Empire (present-day Hamina, Finland)
Result	Swedish Victory

Belligerents
Sweden	Russia

Commanders and leaders
Gustav III	Brigadier Pyotr Slizov

Strength
106 ships of the Archipelago fleet	1 frigate, 72 smaller ships

Casualties and losses
1 gun yawl; 60 dead or wounded	Turuma Sällan Värre recaptured 25 smaller ships sunk or captured 270 men dead, wounded or captured

The battle of Fredrikshamn was an attack by the Swedish archipelago fleet on their Russian counterparts near the town of Fredrikshamn (Hamina) during the Russo-Swedish War (1788–1790).

== Order of battle ==
Swedish coastal fleet was commanded by Gustav III. It consisted of 1 turuma, 1 pojama and 2 udema type archipelago frigates, 1 xebec, 18 galleys, 40 gun sloops (kanonslup), 30 gun yawls (kanonjolle), 9 cannon longboats (kanonbarkass) and 4 mortar longboats (mörsarbarkass).

Russian coastal naval unit was led by Pyotr Slizov. It consisted of 1 turuma type archipelago frigate (Sällan Värre), 1 galley, 10 half-galleys, 59 gun sloops and 2 gun prams Tiger and Leopard. In addition to the naval units the Russians had an artillery battery on the shore supporting them.

== Battle ==
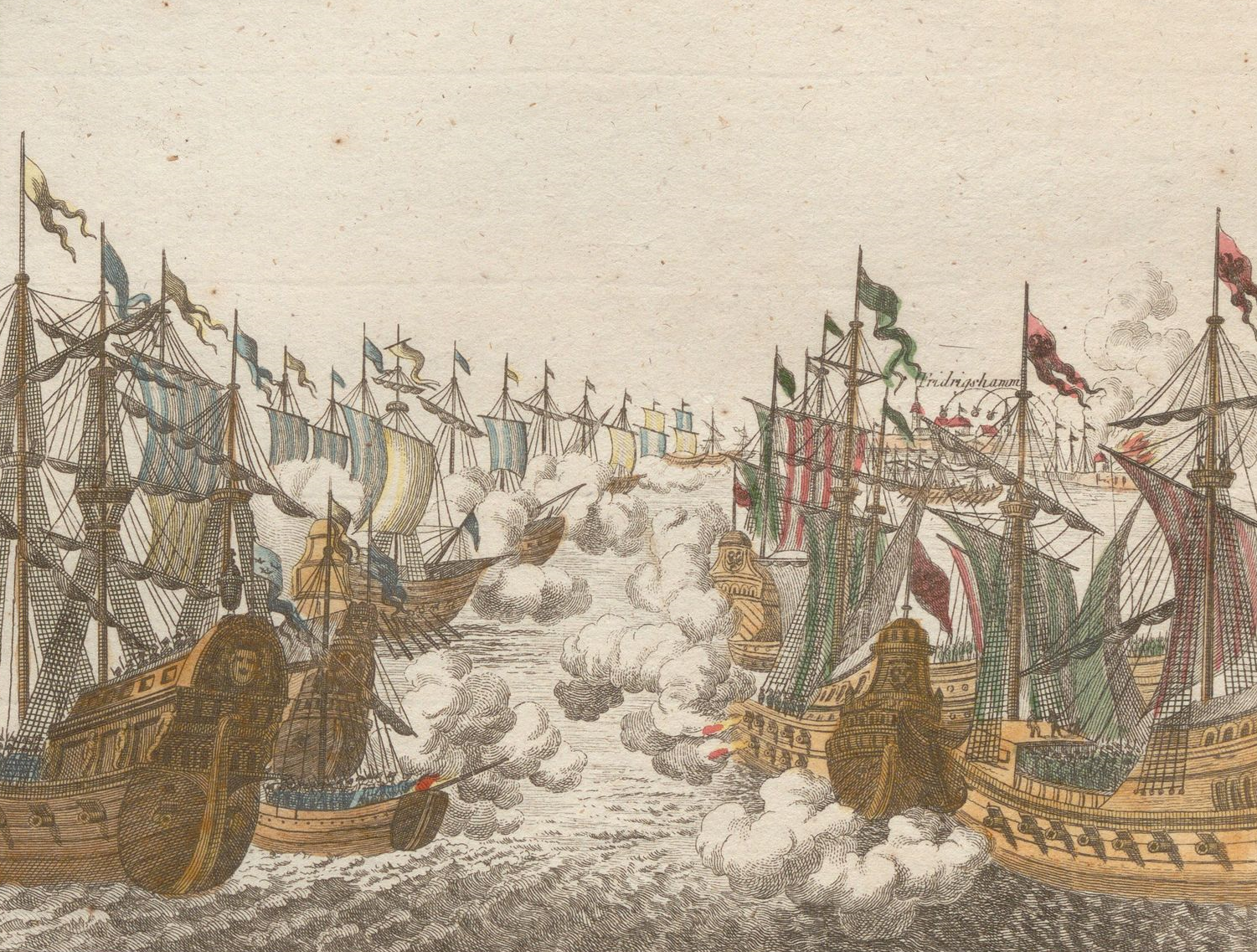
Battle of Fredrikshamn, as depicted in Nordischer Kriegsschauplaz

The battle started in the early morning of May 15, 1790 when the Swedish fleet approached Fredrikshamn. The Russian fleet at Fredrikshamn hastily scrambled and sailed to face them and a several-hour-long firefight commenced with devastating result for the Russians. The battle cost the Russians 26 ships sunk or captured including the turuma type archipelago frigate Sällan Värre that for the second time entered Swedish service after it originally had been captured by the Russians in the First battle of Svensksund. Defenders heaviest vessels were unable to navigate to the shallow waters in the bay and were easily captured by the attacker.

After the battle the Swedish ships entered Fredrikshamn harbor and demanded the commander of the town fortifications to surrender along with the remainder of the Russian fleet. Any surprise initiative the Swedes had after the battle was lost when Gustav III allowed the Russian commander request of an hour of respite to value the demands of surrender. When the attack on the town resumed later that day the garrison was reinforced and ready. Any further Swedish attacks proved fruitless and in the evening of May 15 the Swedish fleet withdrew back to Svensksund.

== Aftermath and analysis ==
According to several historians, the Swedish archipelago fleet under King Gustav III lost a golden opportunity when instead of attacking on 14 May 1790, they chose to delay until 15 May. At the time neither the Russian coastal fleet squadron nor the fort had been properly manned and would have likely been both lost under determined attack by the archipelago fleet alone. The final chance to capture the fort was lost on 15 May when the king allowed an hour of respite which made it possible for the Russians to gather reinforcements and prepare their defenses.

== Bibliography ==
- Jägerskiöld, Stig (1990). Svensksund : Gustav III:s krig och skärgårdsflottan 1788-1790 [Svensksund : War and archipelago fleet of Gustav III 1788-1790] (in Swedish). ISBN 951-50-0498-5.
- Mattila, Tapani (1983). Meri maamme turvana [Sea safeguarding our country] (in Finnish). Jyväskylä: K. J. Gummerus Osakeyhtiö. ISBN 951-99487-0-8.
- Ulf Sundberg, Hjalmarson and Högberg (1998). Svenska krig 1521-1814
