= Amphion (ship) =

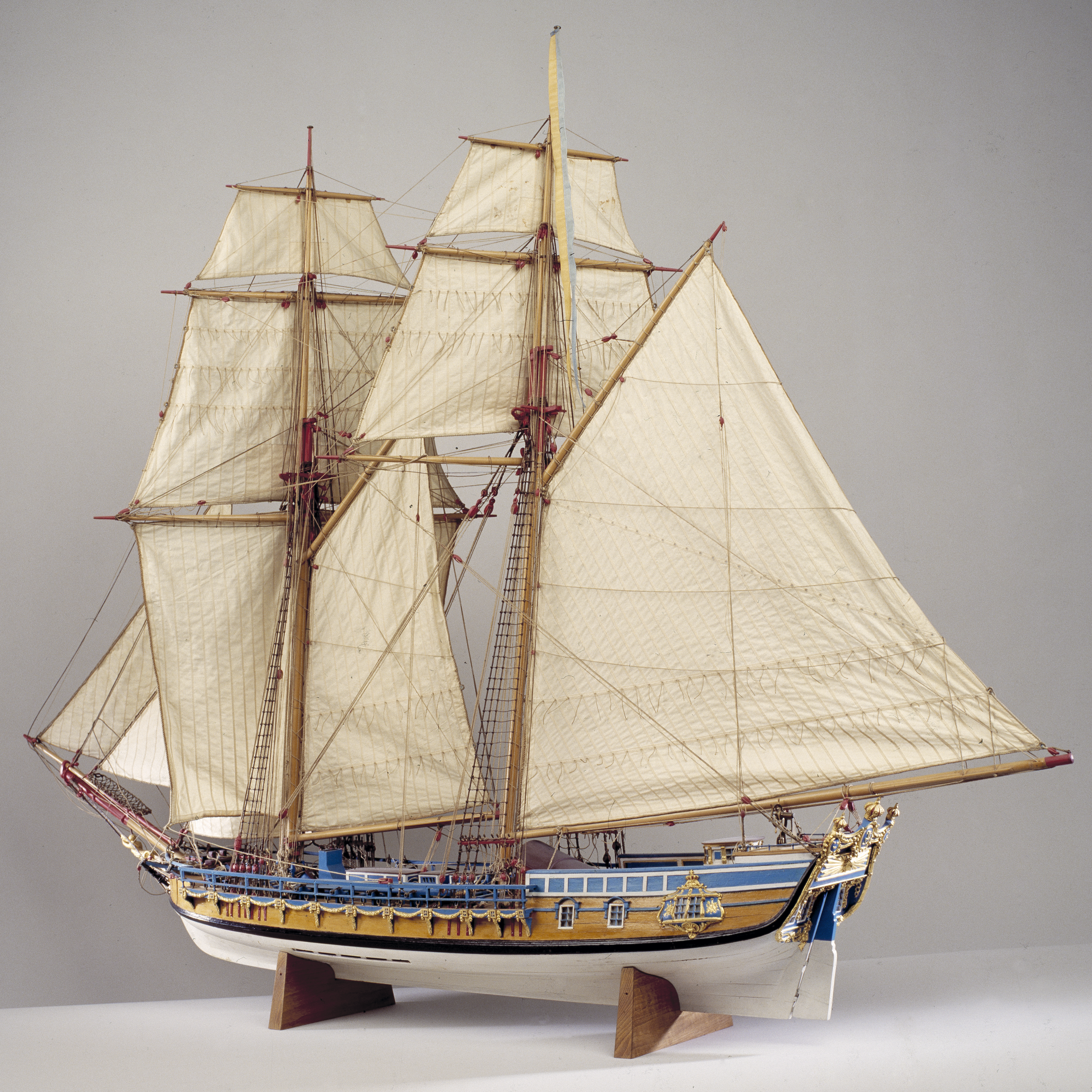
- Model of Amphion with full rig

History

Sweden
- Name: Amphion
- Owner: Gustav III
- Builder: Djurgårdsvarvet
- Launched: 1778
- Decommissioned: 26 August 1884
- Out of service: 14 March 1873
- Fate: Broken up
- Status: Stern preserved at the Maritime Museum in Stockholm

General characteristics
- Class & type: Turuma
- Length: 33 m (108 ft)
- Beam: 6.7 m (22 ft)
- Draught: 2.4 m (7 ft 10 in)
- Installed power: Two-masted sail plan and 16 pairs of oars
- Crew: 150 men

Amphion was the personal pleasure craft of King Gustav III of Sweden. She was designed by Fredrik Henrik af Chapman, built at Djurgårdsvarvet in Stockholm in the summer of 1778, and launched the same year. Amphion, named after Zeus' son and culture patron in Greek mythology, served as a royal yacht and headquarters ship. The ship was essentially a modified turuma, a type of shallow-draught frigate that served in the Swedish archipelago fleet. She was equipped with oars to allow her maneuverability of a galley while retaining a broadside of heavy guns and a full rig. She was equivalent to similar "archipelago frigates" of the archipelago fleet, but at Gustav III's request, she was built without heavy cannons and therefore differed significantly from the other ships of the same type.

Amphion turned out to be one of Chapman's few failures as a ship designer. She suffered from poor seakeeping ability and was also too heavy to row. On her maiden voyage from Karlskrona to Stockholm, poor weather conditions left Amphion shipwrecked in the archipelago of Stockholm, and Gustav III was required to come ashore at Dalarö. Thereafter, she was used mostly for trips out on Lake Mälaren, though also she was used as the king's personal command ship during the Russo-Swedish war of 1788–1790. She later served as a barracks ship into the 19th Century.

In 1884, Amphion was broken up for firewood. Amphion's figurehead and stern castle with the royal command room were spared, and can be seen at the Maritime Museum in Stockholm. The preserved parts underwent preservation and restoration, performed by conservation studio Ateljé Catellani, between 2003 and 2006.

The current stern was added in 1791 after the ship was damaged at the end of the Russian War. The former stern lacked the royal cypher, and its four windows gates were of a simpler design.

== Gallery ==
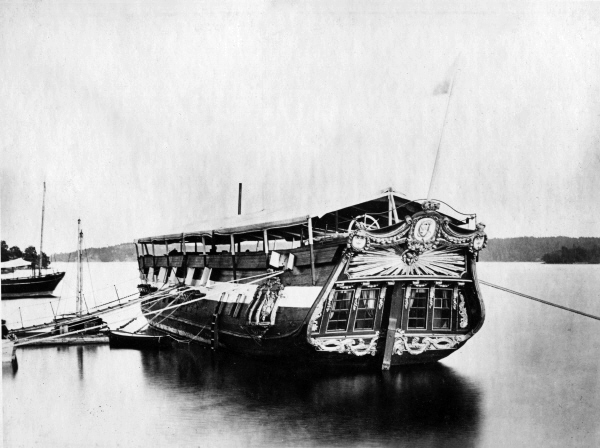
Amphion as a barracks ship

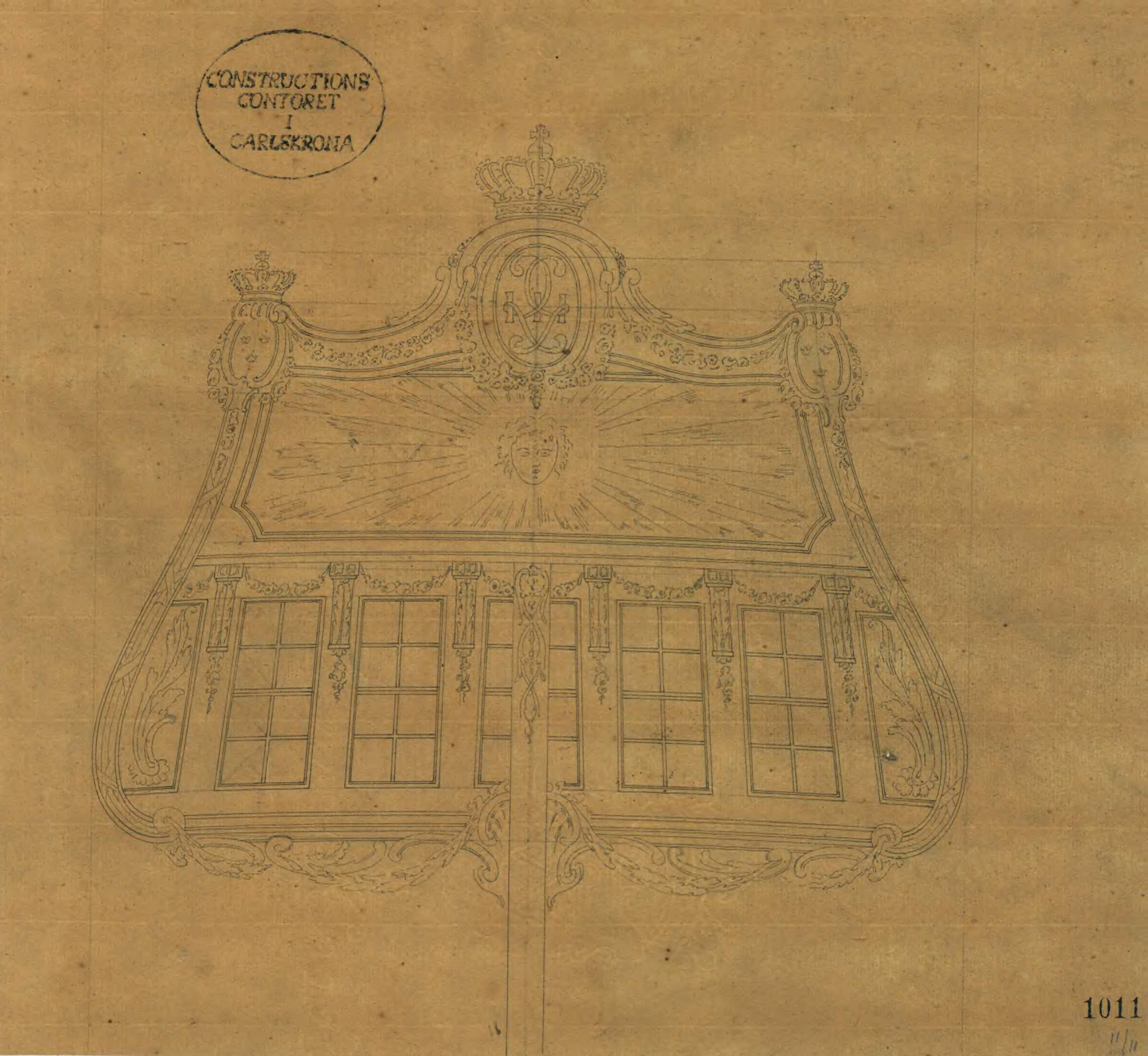
Drawing of the transom.

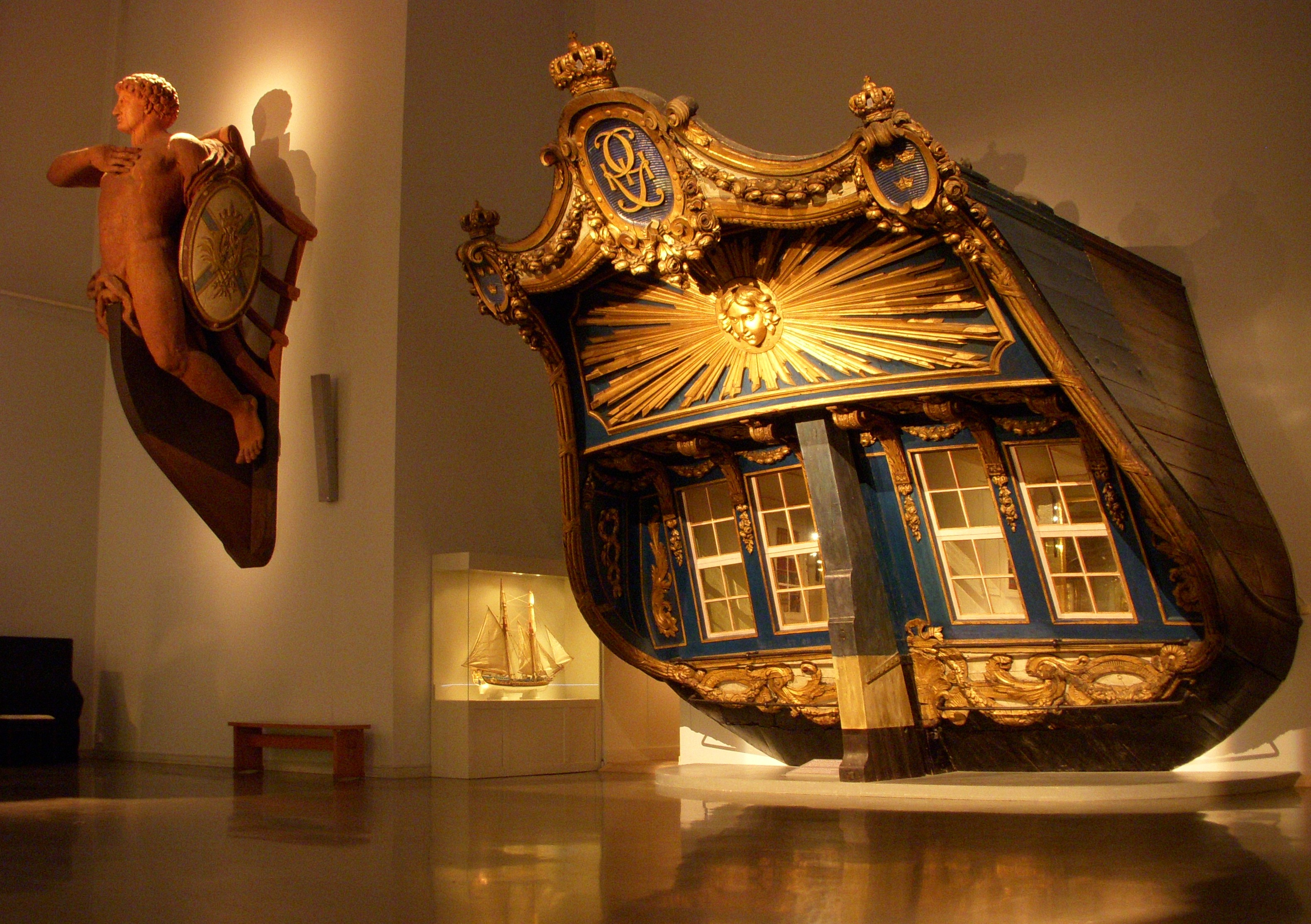
The preserved stern

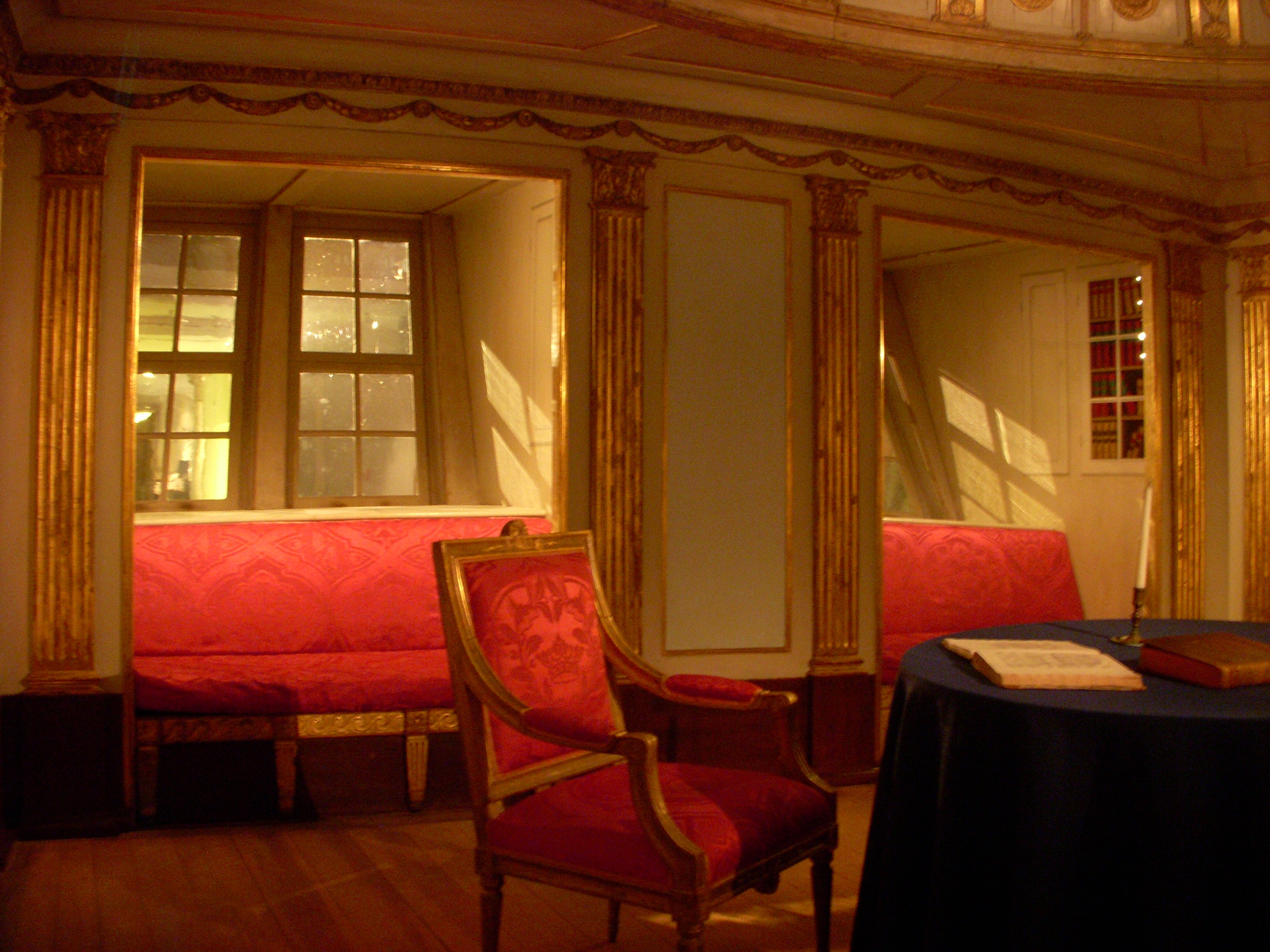
Gustav III's cabin

== Sources ==
- Harris, Daniel G, Fredrik Henrik af Chapman: den förste skeppsbyggnadsarkitekten och hans verk. (Translation by Roderick Klintebo), Literatim, Stockholm. 1998. ISBN 91-973075-0-5.
