= Hemmema =

Type of warship built for the Swedish archipelago fleet and the Russian Baltic navy

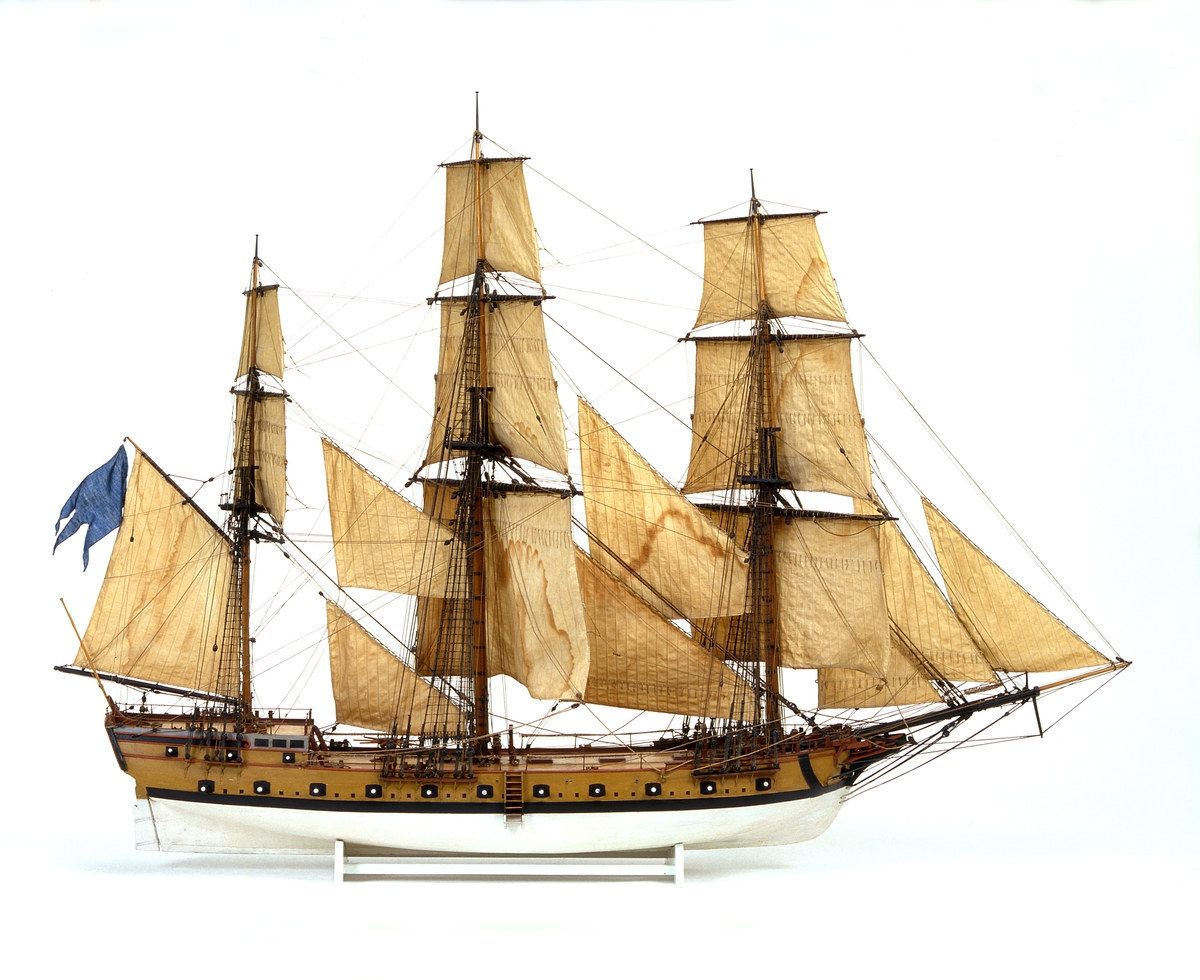
Contemporary model of the hemmema Styrbjörn from the collections of the Maritime Museum in Stockholm

A hemmema (from Finnish "Hämeenmaa", Tavastia) was a type of warship built for the Swedish archipelago fleet and the Russian Baltic Fleet in the late 18th and early 19th centuries. The hemmema was initially developed for use against the Imperial Russian Navy in the Archipelago Sea and along the coasts of Svealand and Finland. It was designed by the prolific and innovative Swedish naval architect Fredrik Henrik af Chapman (1721–1808) in collaboration with Augustin Ehrensvärd (1710–1772), an artillery officer and later commander of the Swedish archipelago fleet. The hemmema was a specialized vessel for use in the shallow waters and narrow passages that surround the thousands of islands and islets extending from the Swedish capital of Stockholm into the Gulf of Finland.

The hemmema replaced the galleys that had made up the core of the Swedish archipelago fleets until the mid-18th century. Compared to galleys, the hemmema had a deeper draft and was slower under oars, but offered superior accommodation for the crew, carried more stores, was more seaworthy and had roughly ten times as many heavy guns. It could be propelled by either sails or oars but was still smaller and more maneuverable than most sailing warships, which made it suitable for operations in confined waters.

Between 1764 and 1809, Sweden built six hemmemas. The hemmema became the largest and most heavily armed vessel in the archipelago fleet and served in the Russo-Swedish War of 1788–90. Oden, the first hemmema, was relatively small and very similar to a turuma, a different type of "archipelago frigate". Russia built six hemmemas based on the Swedish design between 1808 and 1823, after capturing three of the Swedish vessels at the surrender of Sveaborg in 1808. The later versions, both Swedish and Russian, were much larger and much more heavily armed than Oden.

== Background ==
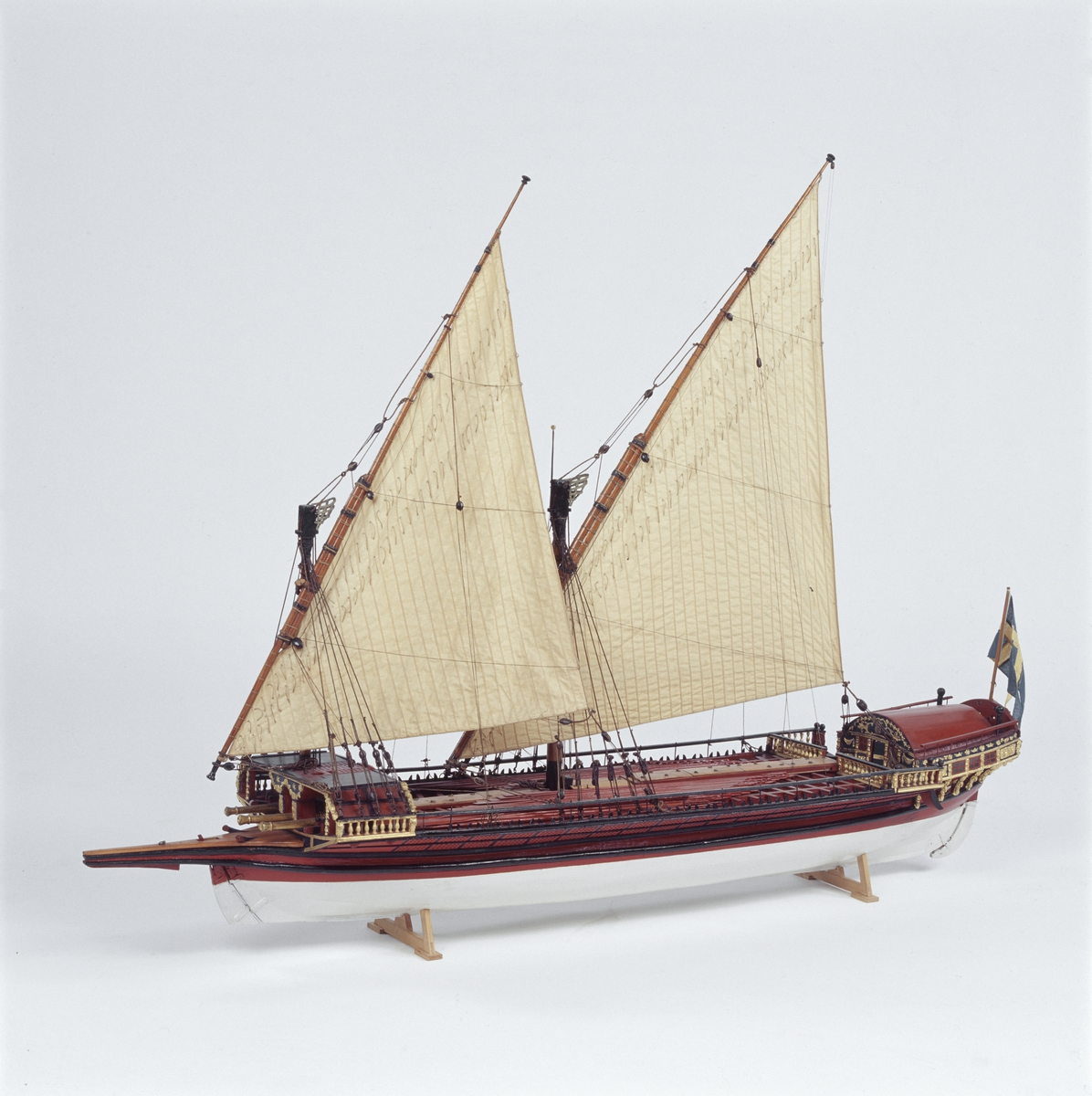
Contemporary model of an early 18th-century Swedish galley from the collections of the Maritime Museum in Stockholm. Small galleys like this one were a mainstay of the first Swedish coastal fleets.

Russian Tsar Peter the Great had established a new capital and powerful naval base in Saint Petersburg in 1703. Russian naval power in the Baltic grew to challenge the interests of Sweden, the other leading power in the Baltic. Swedish holdings at that time included territory in Northern Germany, all of modern Finland and most of the Baltic states, a dominion depending on, and connected by, the Baltic Sea trade routes. During the Great Northern War (1700–1721), Sweden lost all its territories in the Baltic states and suffered Russian raids in Finland and along the chain of islands and archipelagos stretching from the Gulf of Finland to Stockholm. The Swedes began to deploy inshore flotillas of shallow-draft vessels, beginning with smaller versions of the traditional Mediterranean galleys. Most of these new vessels were more akin to galiots and were complemented with gun prams. The disastrous 1741–1743 war with Russia and the minor involvement against Prussia (the "Pomeranian War") during the Seven Years' War (1757–1762) showed the need for further expansion and development of the inshore flotillas with more specialized vessels.

Galleys were effective as troop transports for amphibious operations, but were severely under-gunned, especially in relation to their large crews; a galley with a 250-man crew, most of whom were rowers, would typically carry only one 24-pounder cannon and two 6-pounders, all in the bow. The galleys also lacked decks and adequate shelter for the rower-soldiers, many of whom succumbed to illness as a result of exposure during the war of 1741–1743.

=== Archipelago fleet ===
After the Russian victory against Sweden in 1743, the Swedes established a commission to identify weaknesses in the eastern defenses. In 1747, the commission concluded that the fortifications in southeastern Finland needed to be improved and expanded, and that Sweden needed to build a strong coastal navy. Augustin Ehrensvärd (1710–1772), an artillery officer, was the driving force behind these changes. The committee based many of its conclusions and decisions on his ideas. In 1756, Sweden established the archipelago fleet with the official name arméns flotta ("fleet of the army") under the command of the army department, the War College, with Ehrensvärd as supreme commander. For two decades, the struggle for power between the Hats and the Caps, the dominant political factions at the time, and rivalries between army and navy brought about changes to the archipelago fleet. The parliamentary victory of the Hats in the Riksdag in 1769–70 and the coup d'ètat by King Gustav III in 1772 secured the archipelago fleet's status as an independent branch of the army. Starting in 1770, the archipelago fleet merged with the Finnish Squadron (Finska eskadern) based at Sveaborg. In 1777, it incorporated the Swedish Squadron (Svenska eskadern), the galley fleet based at Stockholm. The Swedish armed forces invested considerable resources in the new army branch and made it a professional, independent organization. The archipelago fleet attracted members of the social and cultural elite who enjoyed the protection and patronage of King Gustav III, who had established himself as an absolute monarch in the 1772 coup.

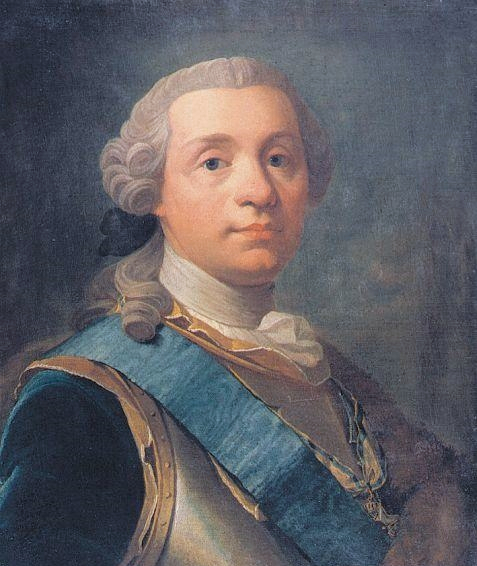
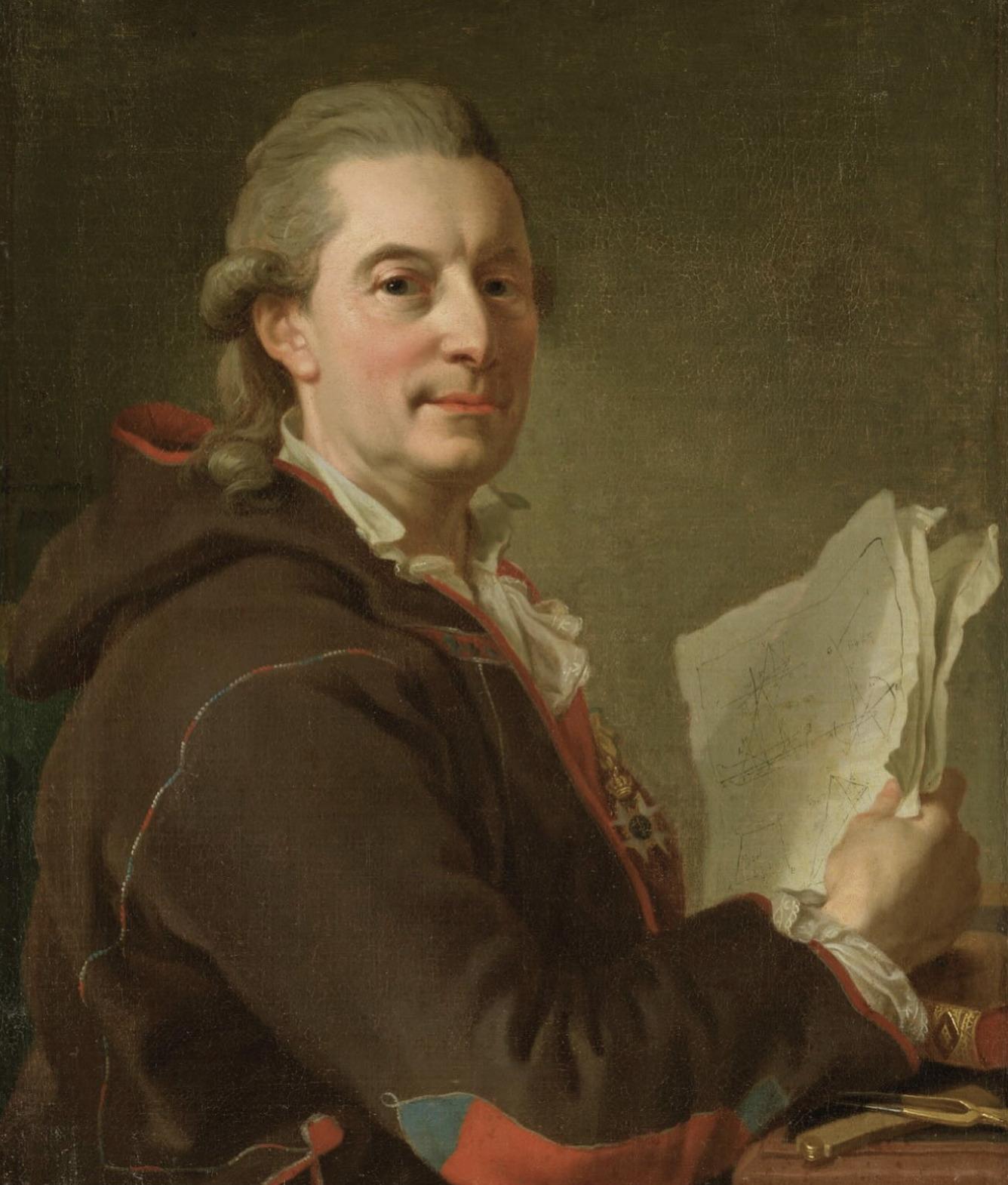
The artillery officer Augustin Ehrensvärd (1710–1772, left) and the innovative shipbuilder Fredrik Henrik af Chapman (1721–1808, right) collaborated to develop the hemmema and several other new types of vessels for the Swedish archipelago fleet.

After the poor performance of galleys in the Russo–Swedish War and the Pomeranian War, the development of replacements became prioritized. During the Pomeranian War, trials had been made with "gun prams" (skottpråmar), heavily armed, oar-driven, flat-bottomed barges with a shallow draft that carried guns in broadside arrangements. The prams carried more guns than the galleys, but proved far too slow to be effective. Augustin Ehrensvärd argued for new archipelago vessels that combined firepower, maneuverability, seaworthiness, and decent crew accommodations. He began a successful collaboration with shipwright Fredrik Henrik Chapman (ennobled "af Chapman" in 1772), and together they developed five new vessels: a gunboat with a 12-pounder gun and a schooner rigging, as well as four types of "archipelago frigates" (skärgårdsfregatter): the smaller udema and pojama, and the larger turuma and hemmema. All four types have been called skärgårdsfregatter in Swedish and English historical literature, though some authors have called the udema and pojama "archipelago corvettes". Chapman specifically designed the archipelago frigates for service off the south coast of Finland and named them after the Finnish provinces of Uusimaa (Uudenmaan in genitive form), Pohjanmaa, Turunmaa and Hämeenmaa (Tavastia).

== Development ==
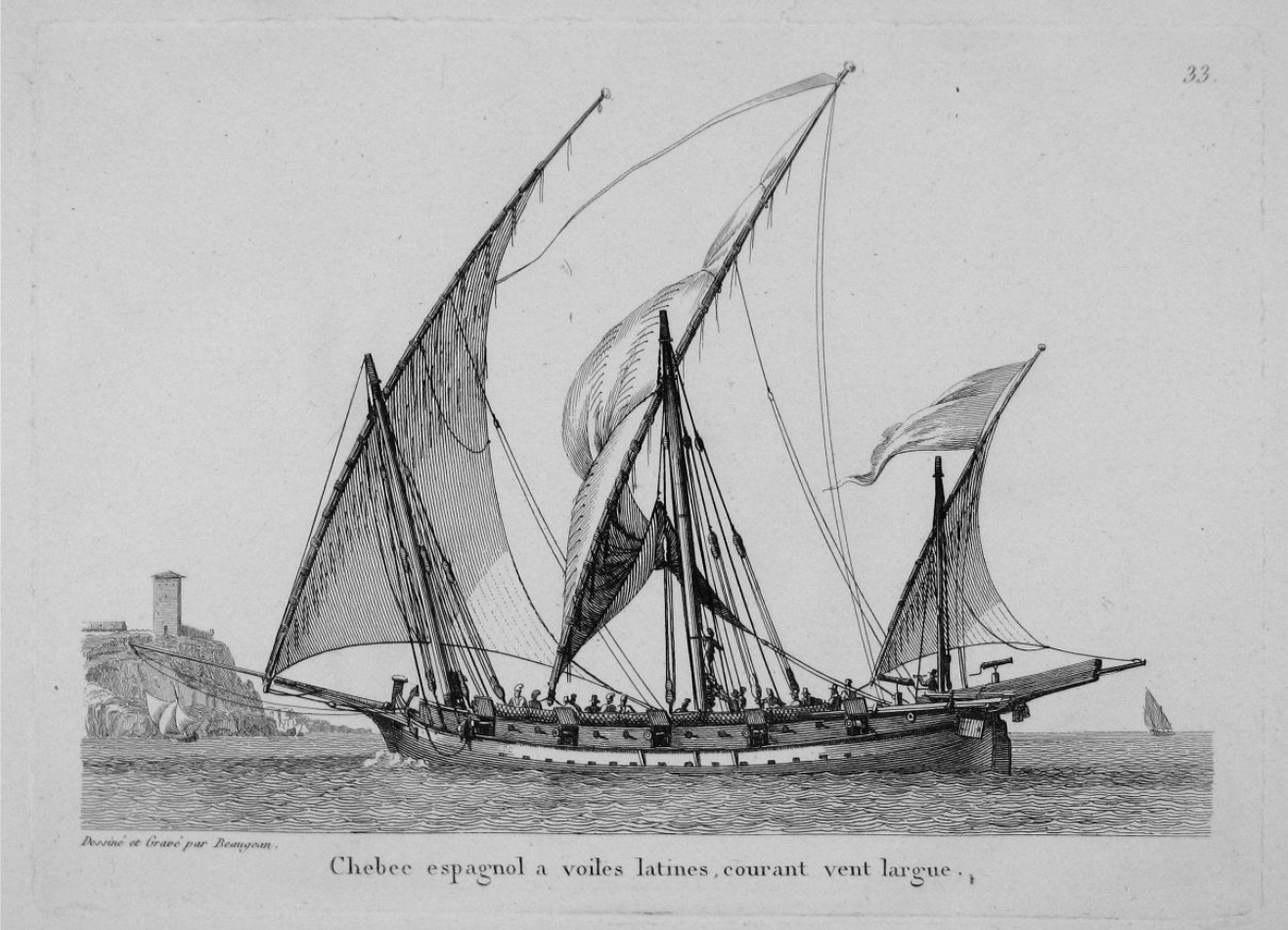
A Spanish xebec from the 1810s; the xebec's design inspired the design of the archipelago frigates

The concept of small sailing frigates with a complementary set of oars (or "sweeps") was not new. The English Tudor navy had used small "galleasses" in the mid-16th century. In the 1660s its successor, the Royal Navy, equipped the equivalent of sixth-rates with oar ports on or below the gundeck. During the 18th century the Russian Navy introduced "shebecks", Baltic variants on the Mediterranean xebecs, for inshore duties. The xebecs were good sailers, could be rowed if necessary and had more guns and greater stores than galleys; they were also less expensive to maintain. The Russian designs influenced Chapman and the Swedish naval commanders. Consequently, Chapman's designs for new ships were elaborations on those principles, but with adaptations to archipelago warfare.

Chapman's archipelago frigates provided better protection for their crew than the galleys they replaced, and up to three times the capacity for stores and provisions. They could operate in the narrow, shallow waters around skerries in all weathers and in open water in all but the worst storms. They had a deeper draft than galleys, but considerably shallower draft than traditional sailing warships. The new ship types also increased the archipelago fleet's firepower, provided it with better defensive capabilities, and made possible more efficient fire support in amphibious operations.

== Design and construction ==
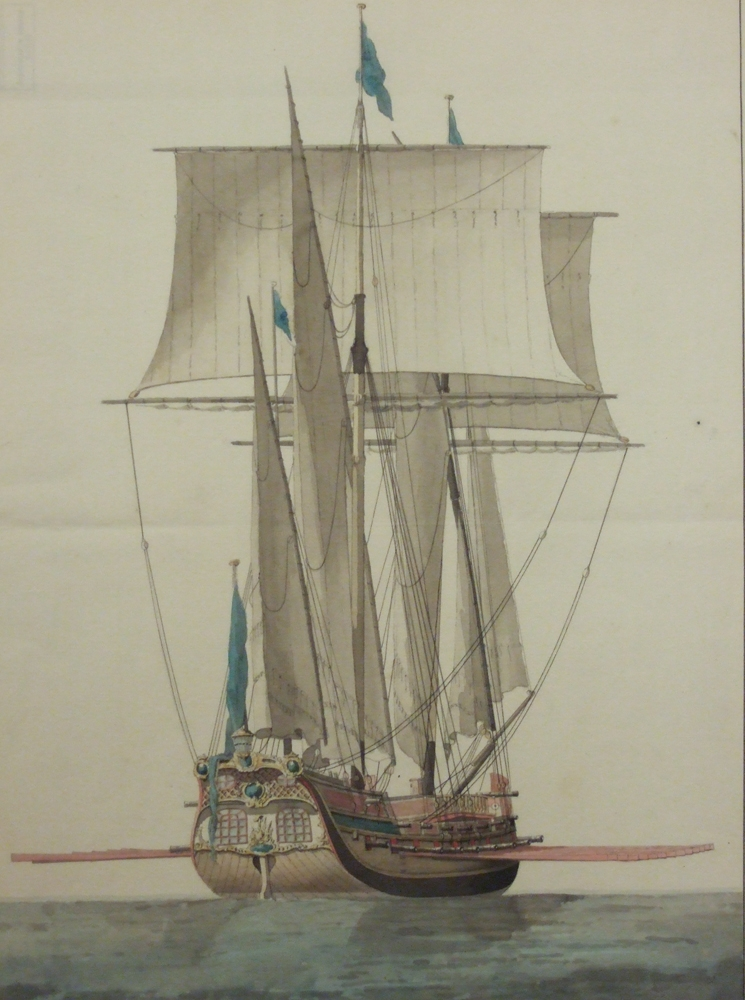
Contemporary color drawing of Oden, the first hemmema

Of the new designs, turumas and hemmemas best fit the description of "archipelago frigate" because of their similarities to small ocean-going frigates. The first hemmema, the Oden, was completed in 1764. It was c. 33 m (108.2 ft) long and 8.2 m (26.8 ft) wide with a draft of 2.8 m (9.25 ft). It had a low hull with no forecastle, only a low quarterdeck, and no poop deck. It had three masts that were initially rigged with lateen sails, like a galley. The navy later replaced the lateen rigs with a more conventional square-sail frigate rig. The early design provided for 14 pairs of oars with four men per oar. The rowers plied their oars from the gun deck through oar ports positioned between the gunports, close to the waterline, which gave the rowers better leverage. The oars were also placed on a rectangular outrigger, designed to further improve the leverage. Even so, hemmemas performed poorly when rowed and were difficult in contrary winds. They were slower than ordinary sailing ships, but sailed better than galleys.

During the Russian war of 1788–1790, Sweden built three hemmemas of a new design. They were considerably larger, 44.5 by 11 m (146 by 36 ft), and the number of oars were increased to 20 pairs. They also had some of the heaviest broadsides, even when compared with the much larger frigates of the high seas navy. The artillery officer Carl Fredrik Aschling had cooperated with Chapman to increase the main armament to twenty-two 36-pounders and two 12-pounders, which increased the draft by about 30 cm (1 ft). The addition of diagonal bracers to reinforce the hull allowed the later hemmemas to carry guns more powerful even than those on the largest sailing frigates of the high seas navy. Due to their considerable firepower and relative size, naval historian Jan Glete has described the hemmemas as "super archipelago frigates".

The hemmema's design was very similar to that of the turuma. The primary difference was that the turuma's oarsmen sat on the weather deck above the guns, whereas the hemmema's oarsmen sat on the gundeck. The later hemmemas were considerably larger, more heavily armed, and of a more robust construction. Glete has described them as variations on the same type, especially when considering the pre-war designs.

== Service ==
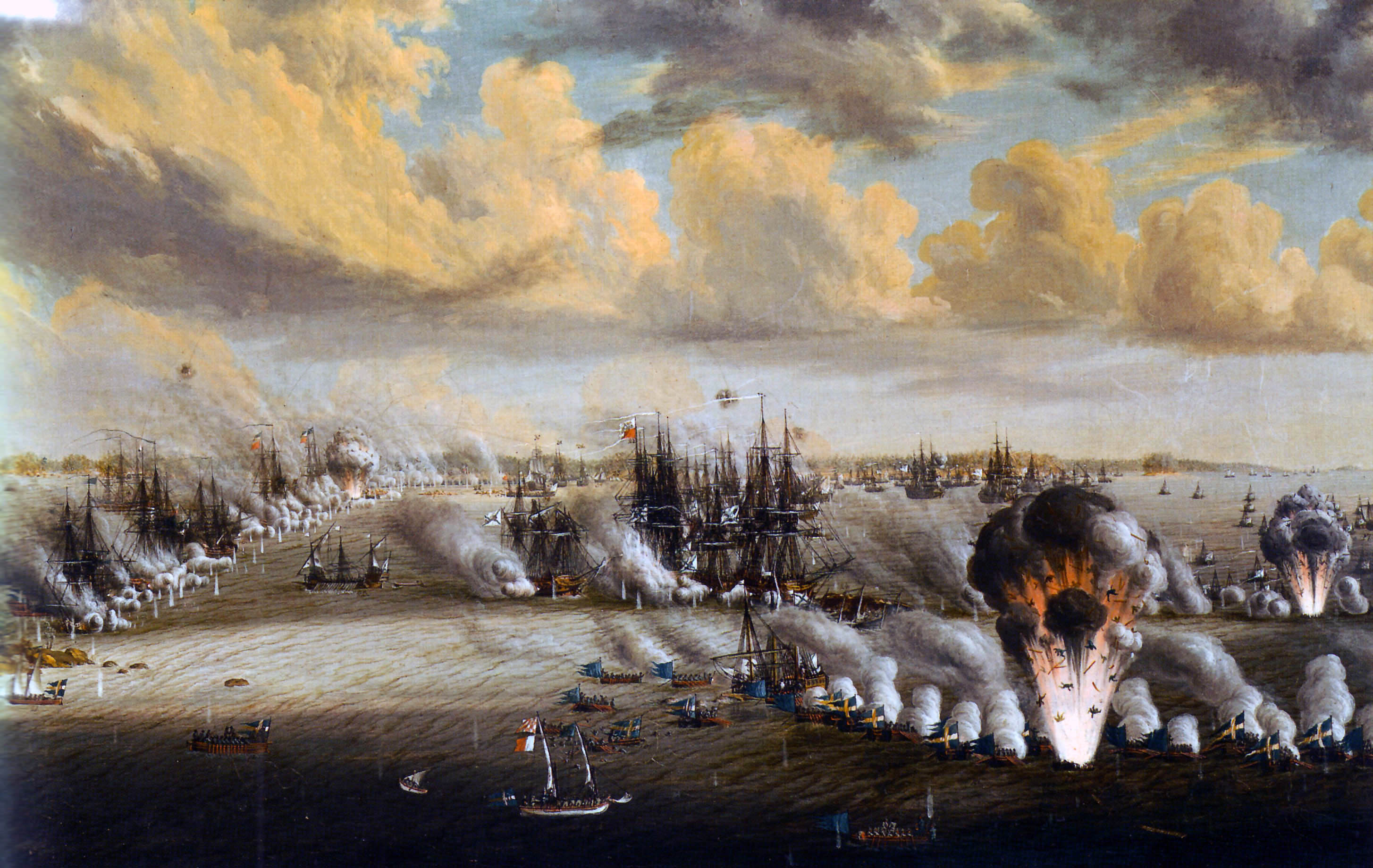
Contemporary Swedish painting of the Battle of Svensksund where two of the larger hemmemas participated

Hemmemas served in the Finnish squadrons during the war of 1788–1790. They supported amphibious operations and conducted raids on the Russian archipelago fleet, while at the same time acting as sea-borne flank support for the Swedish army on the Finnish mainland. Hemmemas fought in the first and second battles of Svensksund. During the first battle in 1789, one hemmema complemented the similar turumas, and in the second battle in July 1790, two hemmemas made up the defensive center and provided a considerable percentage of the firepower.

The Swedes were building three additional hemmemas at the shipyards within the fortress of Sveaborg when it was surrendered to the Russians in 1808, and all three were incorporated in the Russian Navy. Shortly afterward, the Russian Navy built its own 32-gun versions, with the final vessel launched as late as 1823. Two more were built in Sweden in 1809, Birger Jarl and Erik Segersäll. Birger Jarl sank in an accident in 1813 and Erik Segersäll was planned for conversion as a paddlewheel steam battery for coastal defense, though the idea was eventually abandoned and the ship scrapped in 1826.

Like the other specialized archipelago vessels, the hemmema had specific strengths and weaknesses. Although it had superior firepower relative to galleys, its sailing qualities were somewhat mediocre and while highly manoeuvrable under oars, it was still difficult to propel while rowed. A hemmema had the potential to be an effective weapon against galleys, matching their forward firepower and severely outgunning them with its broadside armament. Inside an enemy galley formation, it could wreak considerable havoc, but such a maneuver was never achieved in an actual battle, leaving that tactical role untested.

== Ships ==
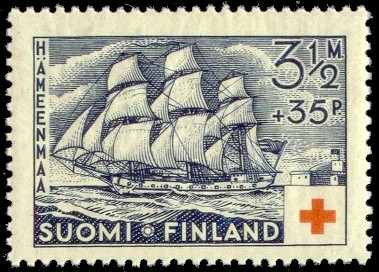
The Styrbjörn depicted on a Finnish postage stamp from 1937

A total of twelve hemmemas were built, six of them for the Swedish archipelago fleet and six for the Russian Navy. Details of individual vessels are listed below. The Swedish hemmemas were all built to the same specifications, except for the early design Oden, and Birger Jarl and Erik Segersäll carried heavier armament than the others. Tredrea and Sozaev list Oden as a turuma rebuilt as a hemmema in 1784, though Oscar Nikula and Lars-Otto Berg do not. The Russian vessels were built between 1808 and 1823 and have been described by Tredea and Sozaev as Bodryi-class "rowing frigates".

Under the Finnish form "Hämeenmaa", the name of the ship type was later carried on to several vessels of the 20th century Finnish Navy.

Swedish-built vessels
Name	Shipyard	Launched	Fate
Oden	Sveaborg	1764	Captured by Russia at the First Battle of Svensksund 1789, recaptured at the Second Battle of Svensksund 1790. Fell into Russian hands at the surrender of Sveaborg in 1808.
Hjalmar	Västervik	1790	Fell into Russian hands at the surrender of Sveaborg in 1808 and renamed Gel'gomar in Russian. Fought in an action in Jungfrusund off Dragsfjärd on 7 August 1808 and participated in recapturing Styrbjörn, which had been temporarily captured by Swedish forces during the action. Broken up in 1828. (Note: Russian career details from Tredrea & Sozaev.)
Starkotter	Västervik	1790	Converted to a hospital ship in 1808. Scrapped in 1816.
Styrbjörn	Stockholm	1790	Captured at the surrender of Sveaborg in 1808 and renamed Stor-Biorn. Destroyed in a Swedish raid the same year according to Berg. According to Tredrea & Sozaev it fought in the action at Jungfrusund 7 August 1808, was captured by the Swedes, and then retaken by the Gel'gomar (former Swedish Hjalmar) the same day. Last listed as a receiving ship (barracks for new recruits) in 1817.
Birger Jarl	Västervik	1809	Sank in an accident off Møn in May 1813.
Erik Segersäll	Norrköping	1809	Planned for conversion to paddle steamer in 1821, but scrapped in 1826.

Specifications of Swedish vessels
Vessels	Size (meters)	Size (feet)	Pairs of oars	Armament
Oden	length: 33 width: 8.2 draft: 2.8	l: 108.2 w: 26.8 d: 9.25	14	18 × 12-pounders 4 × 3-pounders 16 swivel guns
Hjalmar, Starkotter, Styrbjörn, Birger Jarl, Erik Segersäll	length: 43 width: 8.9 draft: 3	l: 141 w: 29 d: 9.8	20	24 × 36-pounders 2 × 12-pounders

Russian-built vessels (Note: Based on Tredrea & Sozaev.)
Name	Shipyard	Launched	Fate
Bodryi	Saint Petersburg	1808	Participated in the bombardment of Danzig in 1813. Broken up in 1829.
Neva	Saint Petersburg	1808	Broken up in 1829.
Sveaborg	Saint Petersburg	1808	Broken up in 1822.
Petergof	Saint Petersburg	1808	Broken up in 1822.
Torneo	Saint Petersburg	1808	Flagship of Rear Admiral von Moller 1812–13. Participated in the bombardment of Danzig in 1813. Broken up in 1824.
Mirnyi	Saint Petersburg	1823	Cruised in the Baltic in 1826. Broken up after 1834.

Specifications of Russian vessels
Size (meters)	Size (feet)	Pairs of oars	Armament
length: 43.9 width: 10.9 draft: 2.6	l: 144 w: 35.75 d: 8.5	20	24 × 36-pounders 2 × 12-pounders 6 × "smaller guns"

== See also ==
- Galley
- Gunboat
- Rowing
