= Tavastia =

Tavastia (Finnish: Häme) or Tavastland may refer to:

== Regions ==
- Häme (Swedish: Tavastland, Latin: Tavastia)
- Tavastia (historical province), a historical territory of Tavastians, later province of the kingdom of Sweden, located in modern-day Finland
- Tavastia Province, a province of Finland from 1831 to 1997
- Tavastia Proper (known as Tavastia until 1998), a modern region of Finland
- Tavastia (constituency), an electoral district of the Parliament of Finland

== Other ==
- Tavastia Club, a rock music club in Helsinki, Finland
- MV Tavastland, a ship

== See also ==
- Hämeenmaa (disambiguation)
- Päijänne Tavastia, a modern region of Finland
- Tavastians, people from Tavastia
- Tavastum
