= Hämeenmaa =

Hämeenmaa may refer to:

- Finnish gunboat Hämeenmaa, 1917–1953
- Finnish frigate Hämeenmaa, 1964–1985, later a minelayer
- Hämeenmaa-class minelayer, a two vessel strong class of coastal minelayers
- Hemmema, a Swedish late 18th century type of warships.

== See also ==
- Tavastia (disambiguation)
- Häme
