= Battle of Svensksund (1789) =

Part of the Russo-Swedish War

Coordinates: 60.45°N 26.99°E

First battle of Svensksund / Rochensalm
- Part of the Russo-Swedish War (1788–1790)
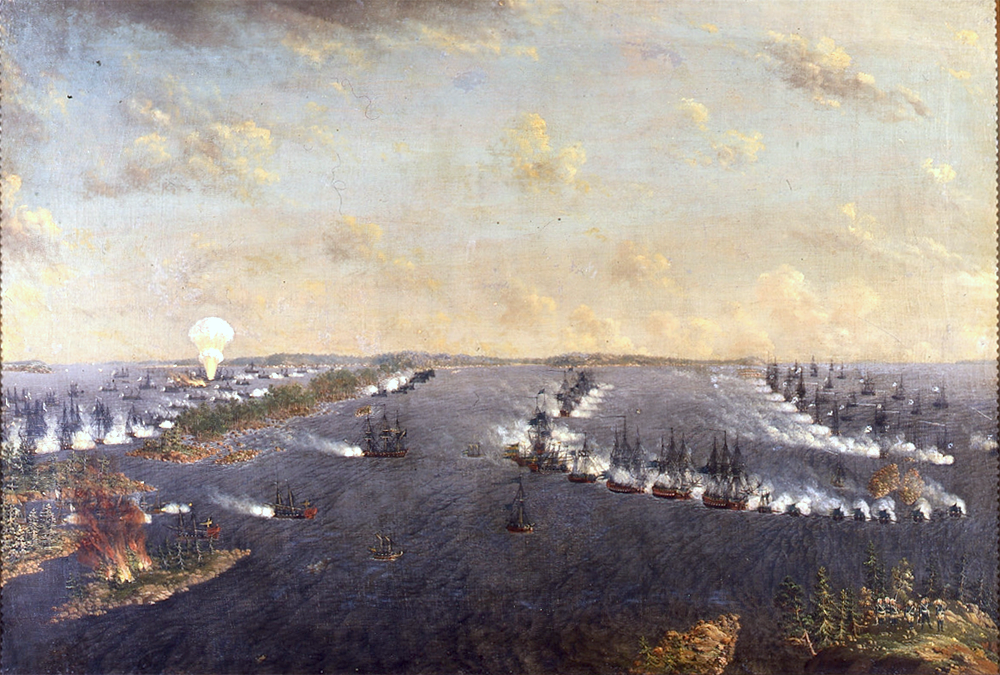
- Battle of Svensksund 24 August 1789 by Johan Tietrich Schoultz
Date	24 August (15 August OS) 1789
Location	Svensksund, (now Kotka, southern Finland)
Result	Russian victory

Belligerents
Swedish Navy	Imperial Russian Navy

Commanders and leaders
Carl August Ehrensvärd; Carl Olof Cronstedt; Enrique MacDonell	Charles Henry of Nassau-Siegen; Ivan Balle; Count Giulio Litta

Strength
12 archipelago frigates; 5 galleys; 20 gun sloops; 4 cannon longboats; 4 mortar longboats; auxiliaries; 5,000 men	24 larger ships; 3 bomb vessels; 47 galleys; 30 gun sloops; 3 cutters; auxiliaries; 12,000 men

Casualties and losses
Battle: 5 archipelago frigates; 2 galleys; 10 gun sloops; 1,500 men; 30 auxiliaries vessels torched after battle	1 galley; 1 gun sloop; 383 killed 628 wounded 22 captured

The First Battle of Svensksund, also known as the First Battle of Rochensalm, (Note: From the Russian version of the Finnish Ruotsinsalmi.) was a naval battle fought in the Gulf of Finland in the Baltic Sea outside the present-day city of Kotka on 24 August 1789 during the Russo-Swedish War.

== Order of battle ==
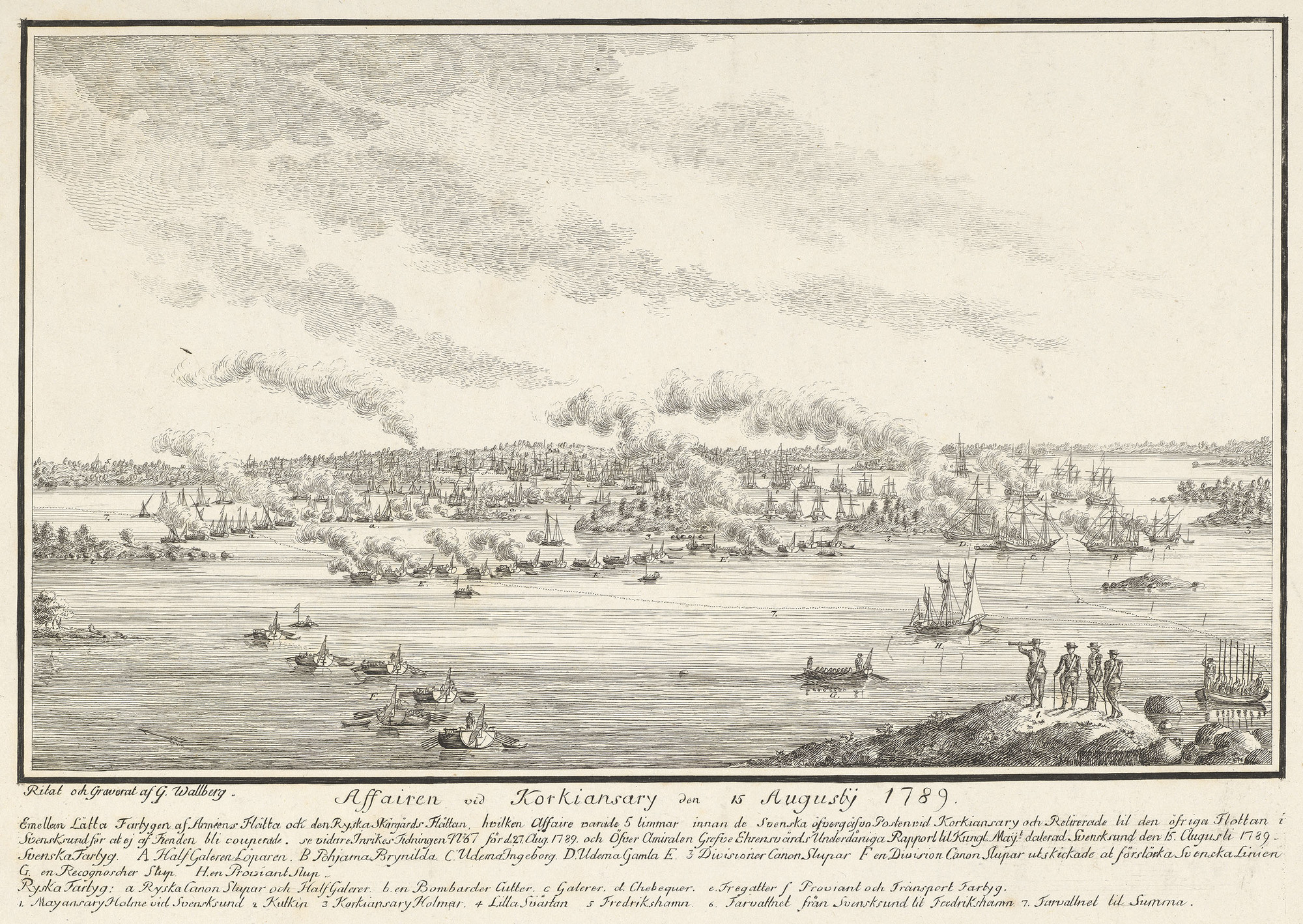
Naval engagement near Korkiansary, 1789

The Swedish fleet at Svensksund consisted of one light, shallow draft, frigate, six turumas, one hemmema, three udemas, and one pojoma archipelago frigate, with twenty gun sloops, four mortar longboats, four cannon longboats and five galleys. The fleet had 5,000 men plus those aboard auxiliaries and transports. Swedish strength was dispersed defending the whole length of the coastline. The Swedish open sea fleet failed to defeat the Russian fleet at Öland and was unable to clear Russian ships from the Porkkala region.

The Russian coastal fleet consisted of a frigate, eight xebecs, five brigs, three bomb vessels, eighteen galleys, twenty-nine half-galleys, twelve gun sloops and three cutters with a total of 12000 men plus those aboard auxiliaries. The Russian coastal fleet was supported by a squadron of three frigates, seven xebecs, and two dozen smaller ships from the open sea fleet commanded by Ivan Balle.

== First phase of the battle ==
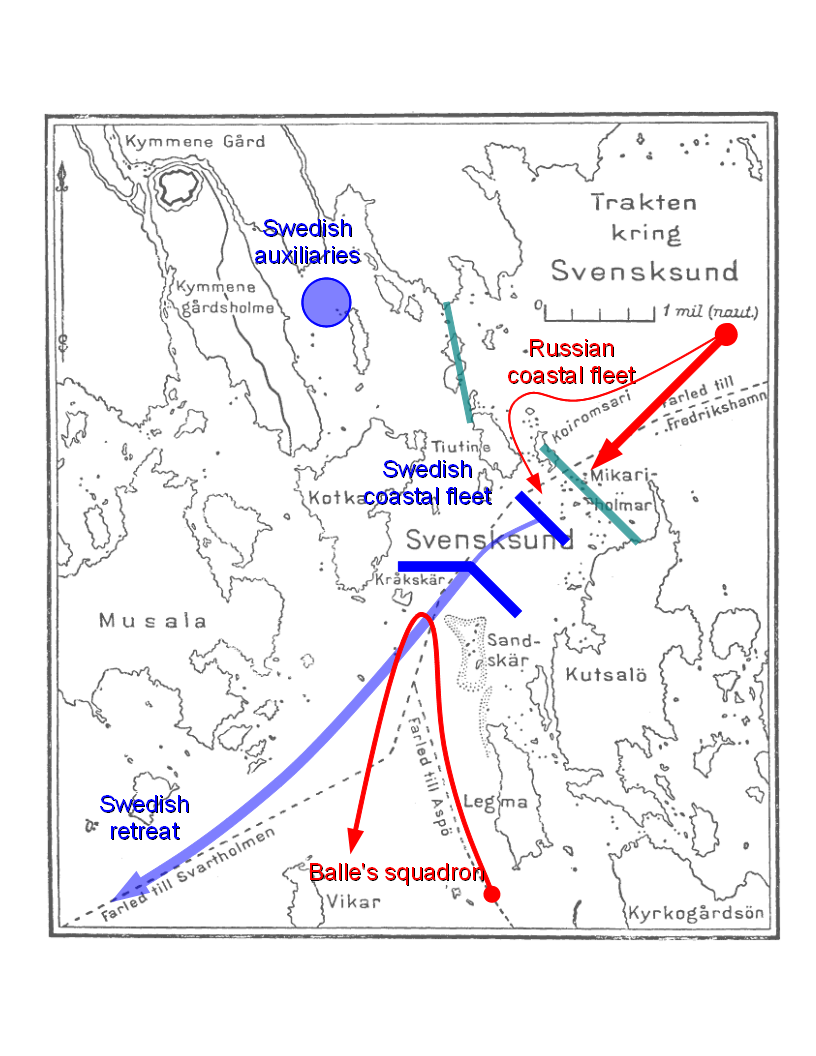
First battle of Svensksund

The Swedish fleet prepared for Russian numerical superiority by creating blockades of scuttled ships in the narrow passages on 23 August. Failure to blockade all the narrow passages made this operation unsuccessful. Action between main elements of the Swedish archipelago fleet and the Russian squadron led by Balle started at 10:00 on 24 August and the artillery duel continued for six hours before the initial Russian attack from the south was beaten back with Russians losing three ships captured and several others badly damaged.

== Second phase of the battle ==
The Russian coastal fleet had meanwhile approached from the east and was probing its way through the Swedish blockade under fire. Advantage shifted from the defenders to the attackers at 16:00 when the right wing of the Russian coastal fleet led by Giolio Litta penetrated the unblockaded narrow passage between Majasaari (Koiromsari) and Tiutine. The Russian attack forced Swedish ships guarding the blockade to withdraw allowing the Russians to clear remaining blockade obstacles.

Russians captured the turuma Sällan Värre which had run aground while defending the blockades and Enrique MacDonell's hemmema Oden which had come to its aid. The Swedish archipelago fleet withdrew into the safety of fortress at Svartholm when it became clear that Russians had beaten the blockade. Several other ships were lost during the withdrawal. The turuma Björn Järnsida, which had been Ehrensvärd's flagship at the start of the battle, ran aground and struck its colors after bravely fighting nearly to the last man. The frigate af Trolle, turuma Ragvald, and a gun sloop were also captured. Swedish auxiliaries and transport vessels trapped north of island of Kotka were burned to prevent their capture.

== Aftermath ==
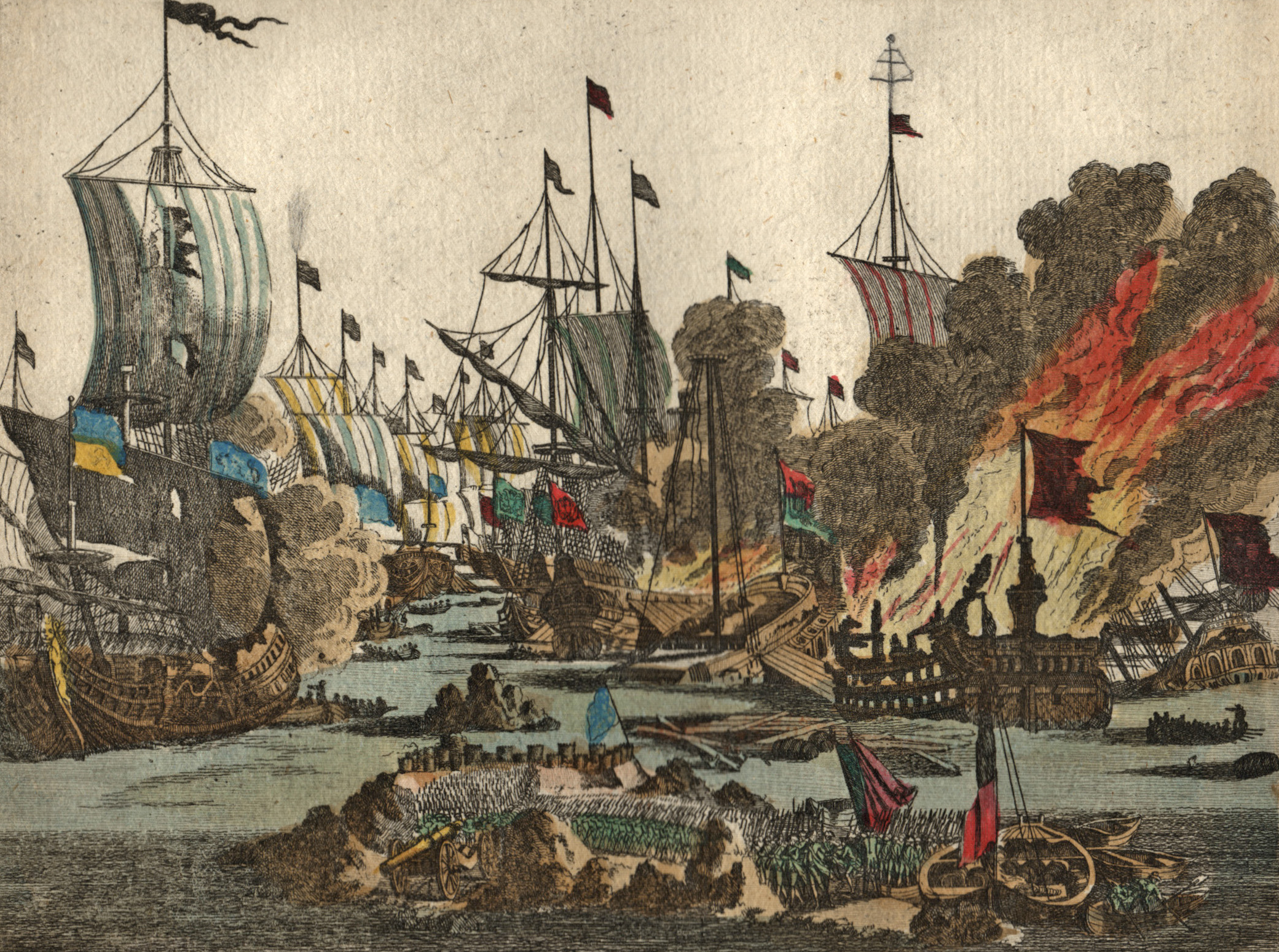
Battle of Svensksund 1789, as depicted in Nordischer Kriegsschauplaz

Total Swedish losses were three turuma archipelago frigates, one hemmema archipelago frigate, one light frigate, one galley, one half-galley, one schooner, nine gun sloops and thirty transport and auxiliary vessels. Roughly 1500 Swedes were killed, wounded or captured during the battle. A field hospital was formed for another 500 sick Swedes unable to evacuate. Russian losses were one galley and one gun sloop blown up. Russians recaptured all ships from Balle's squadron captured by Swedes early in the battle. Their casualties were 383 men killed, 628 injured and 22 captured.

Russians gained a clear victory but failed to inflict decisive defeat on the Swedish archipelago fleet. A delayed attack by Karl Heinrich von Nassau-Siegen allowed Swedes to defeat Ivan Balle's squadron. Early defeat of Balle's squadron allowed most of the Swedish fleet to reach the safety of Svartholm fortress and regroup for later battles. Navigation of the shallow yet unobstructed narrow between Tiutine and Koiromsari by Giulio Litta's small galley force was the crucial factor in Russian success at Svensksund.

Several factors contributed to the Swedish defeat. A successful Russian blockade at Porkkala prevented two archipelago frigates, roughly twenty galleys, and several gun sloops and yawls from reaching Svensksund in August 1789. Ehrensvärd's preparations for defense were hampered by King Gustav III's opposition to his plan. Ehrensvärd's decision not to blockade the narrow between Tiutine and Koiromsari due to his belief that it was too shallow to navigate was a crucial error; and delayed construction of obstacles in the straits opening towards Frederikshamn made it possible for the Russians to clear them quickly. Inadequate sounding of the Swede's selected battleground caused several Swedish ships to run aground during the battle. The Swedes might have been victorious at Svensksund in 1789 had the king allowed Ehrensvärd to withdraw to Svartholm after defeating Balle's squadron as Ehrensvärd had planned. King Gustav III was aware his fleet was running low on ammunition when he gave the order to fight against the main force of the Russian coastal fleet.

== Bibliography ==
- Mattila, Tapani (1983). Meri maamme turvana [Sea protecting our country] (in Finnish). Jyväskylä: K. J. Gummerus Osakeyhtiö. ISBN 951-99487-0-8.
