= Turuma =

Type of Swedish warship

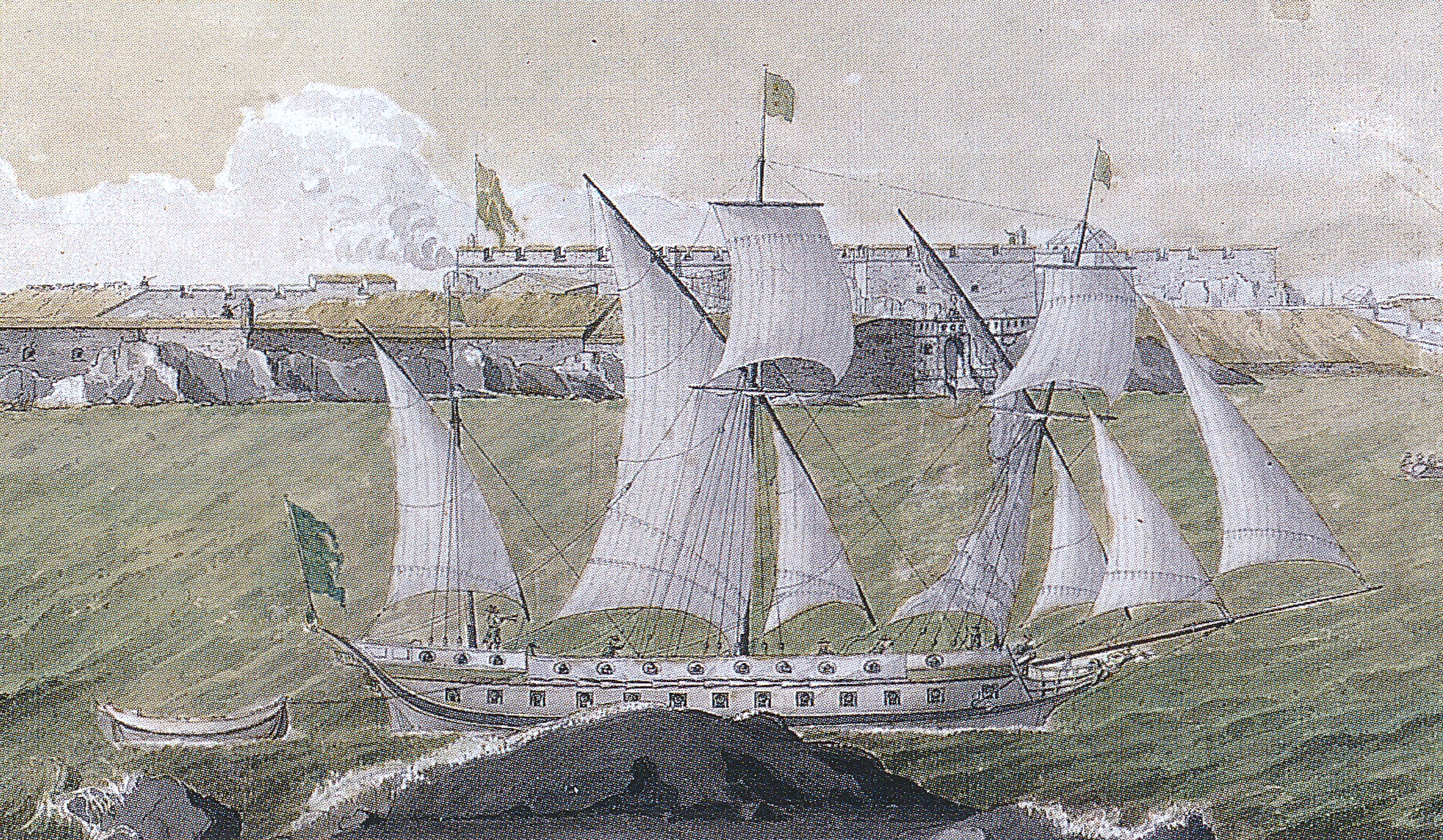
Painting of a turuma off the fortifications at Sveaborg by A. E. Geete, 1770.

A turuma (from the Finnish word "Turunmaa") was a type of warship built for the Swedish archipelago fleet in the late 18th century. It was specifically developed for warfare in the Archipelago Sea and along the coasts of Svealand and Finland. The turuma was designed by the prolific naval architect Fredrik Henrik af Chapman for use in an area of mostly shallow waters and groups of islands and islets that extend from Stockholm all the way to the Gulf of Finland.

It was designed to replace the galleys that made up the core of the fleets that operated along the coasts and in the archipelagos of the Baltic Sea. The turuma had a bigger draft, was somewhat slower under oars, but offered superior accommodation for its crew, was more seaworthy and had roughly ten times the number of heavy guns. It could be propelled with either sails or oars and was both smaller and more manoeuvrable than most sailing warships which made it suitable for operations in shallow, confined waters.

Between 1761 and 1790, 14–15 turumas were built, including Amphion, a modified version used by King Gustav III as both a pleasure craft and command ship. The turuma was among the heaviest in the arsenal of the archipelago fleet and a number of them served in the Russo-Swedish War of 1788–1790. It had three masts, two decks and was equipped with 16–22 pairs of oars along with a crew of about 220–260. Its length was 35–39 m, width 9 m, and the draft 3.3 m. The armament consisted of 24–28 heavy guns with up to 24 swivel guns for close-quarter combat.

== Background ==
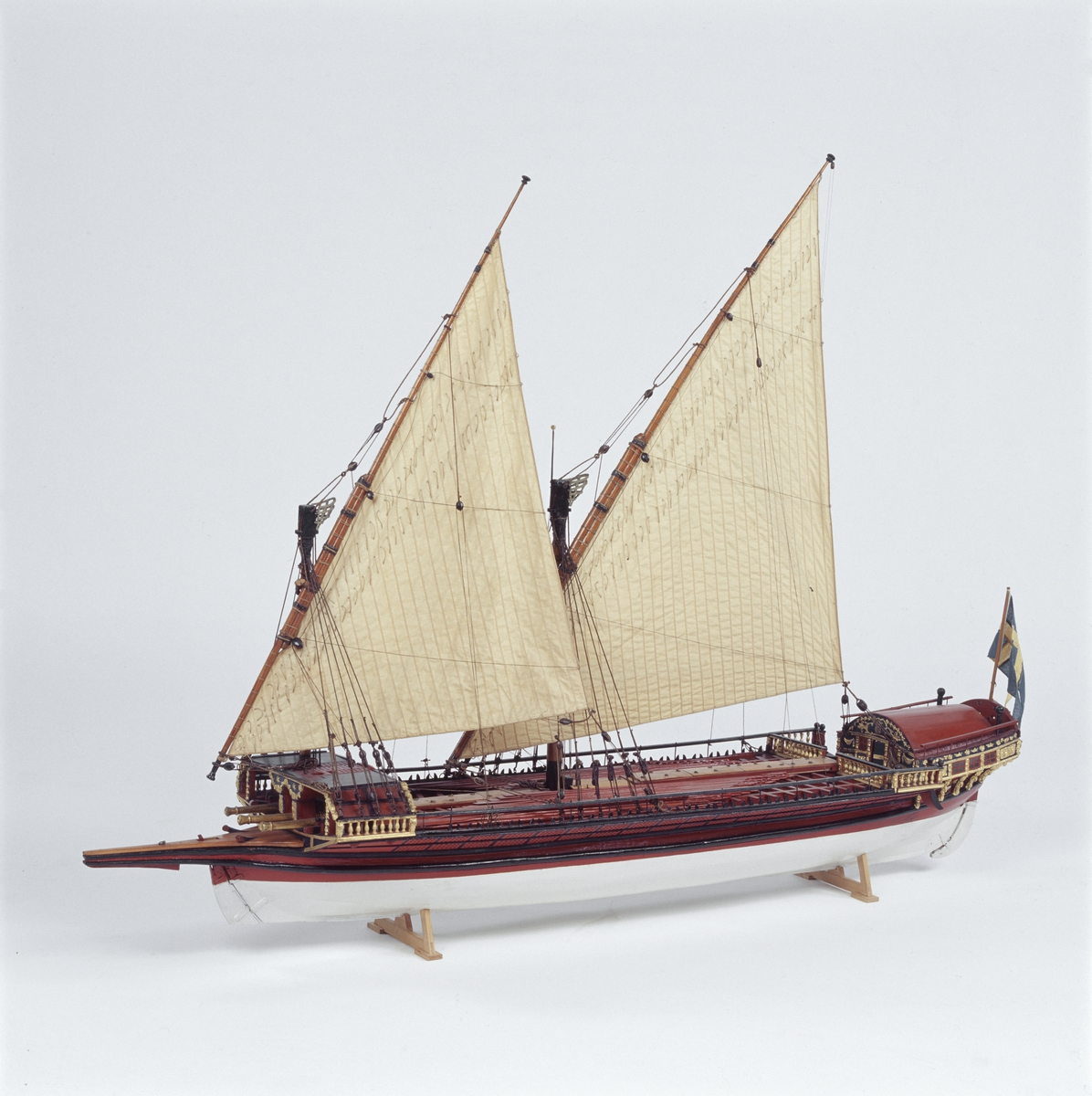
Contemporary model of an early 18th-century Swedish galley from the collections of the Maritime Museum in Stockholm. Small galleys like this one were a mainstay of the first Swedish coastal fleets.

In the early 18th century, the establishment of Russian naval power in the Baltic challenged the interests of Sweden, at the time one of the major powers in the Baltic. The Swedish Empire at the time included territory in Northern Germany, all of modern Finland and most of the Baltic states, a dominion held together by the Baltic sea routes. Russian Tsar Peter the Great had established a new capital and naval base in Saint Petersburg in 1703. During the Great Northern War 1700–1721 Sweden lost its Baltic state territories, and experienced destructive Russian raiding in Finland and along the chain of islands and archipelagos that stretched all the way from the Gulf of Finland to the capital of Stockholm. The traumatic experience led to the establishment of inshore flotillas of shallow-draft vessels. The first of these consisted mainly of smaller versions of the traditional Mediterranean warship, the galleys. Most of these more akin to galiots and were complemented with gun prams. The disastrous war against Russia 1741–1743 and the minor involvement in Prussia in the Pomeranian War 1757–1762 showed the need for further expansion and development of the inshore flotillas with more specialized vessels.

Traditional galleys were effective as troop transports for amphibious operations, but were severely under-gunned, especially in relation to their large crews; a galley with a 250-man crew, most of whom were rowers, would typically be armed with only one 24-pounder cannon and two 6-pounders, all in the bow. However, they were undecked and lacked adequate shelter for the rower-soldiers, great numbers of which succumbed to illness in the 1741–1743 war.

=== The archipelago fleet ===
After the defeat against Russia, a commission was assigned to identify weaknesses in the eastern defenses. In 1747, it came to the conclusion that the fortifications in southeastern Finland needed to be improved and expanded and that a strong coastal navy should be built. The artillery officer Augustin Ehrensvärd was the driving force behind these changes and many of the conclusions and decisions of the committee were based on his ideas for improvements. In 1756, a dedicated archipelago fleet was founded and put under the command of the War College, the army department, with Ehrensvärd as highest commander and the official name arméns flotta ("the fleet of the army"). Over two decades the archipelago fleet went through several changes caused by the competition between the Hats and the Caps, the dominant political fractions at the time, and because of rivalries between army and navy. With the parliamentary victory of the Hats in the riksdag of 1769–70 and the coup d'état by Gustav III in 1772, the archipelago fleet's status as an independent organization within the army was secured. From 1770, it was given the Finnish squadron (Finska eskadern) based in Sveaborg and in 1777 the galley fleet based in Stockholm was included in the archipelago fleet as the Swedish squadron (Svenska eskadern). The Swedish military invested considerable resources into the new army branch and made it a professional, independent organization. The archipelago fleet attracted the social and cultural elite that enjoyed the protection and patronage of King Gustav III who had strengthened his authority as an absolute monarch in the 1772 coup.

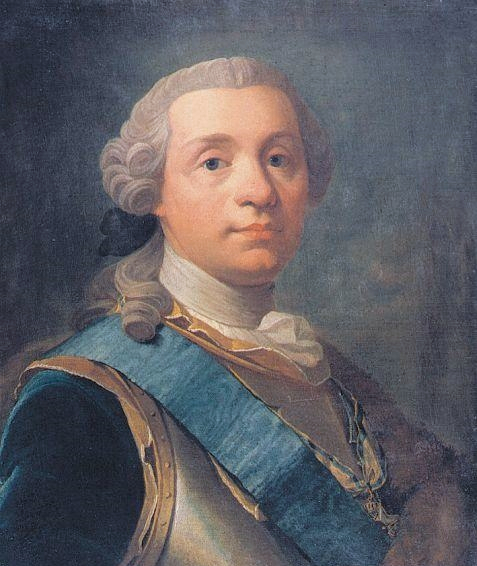
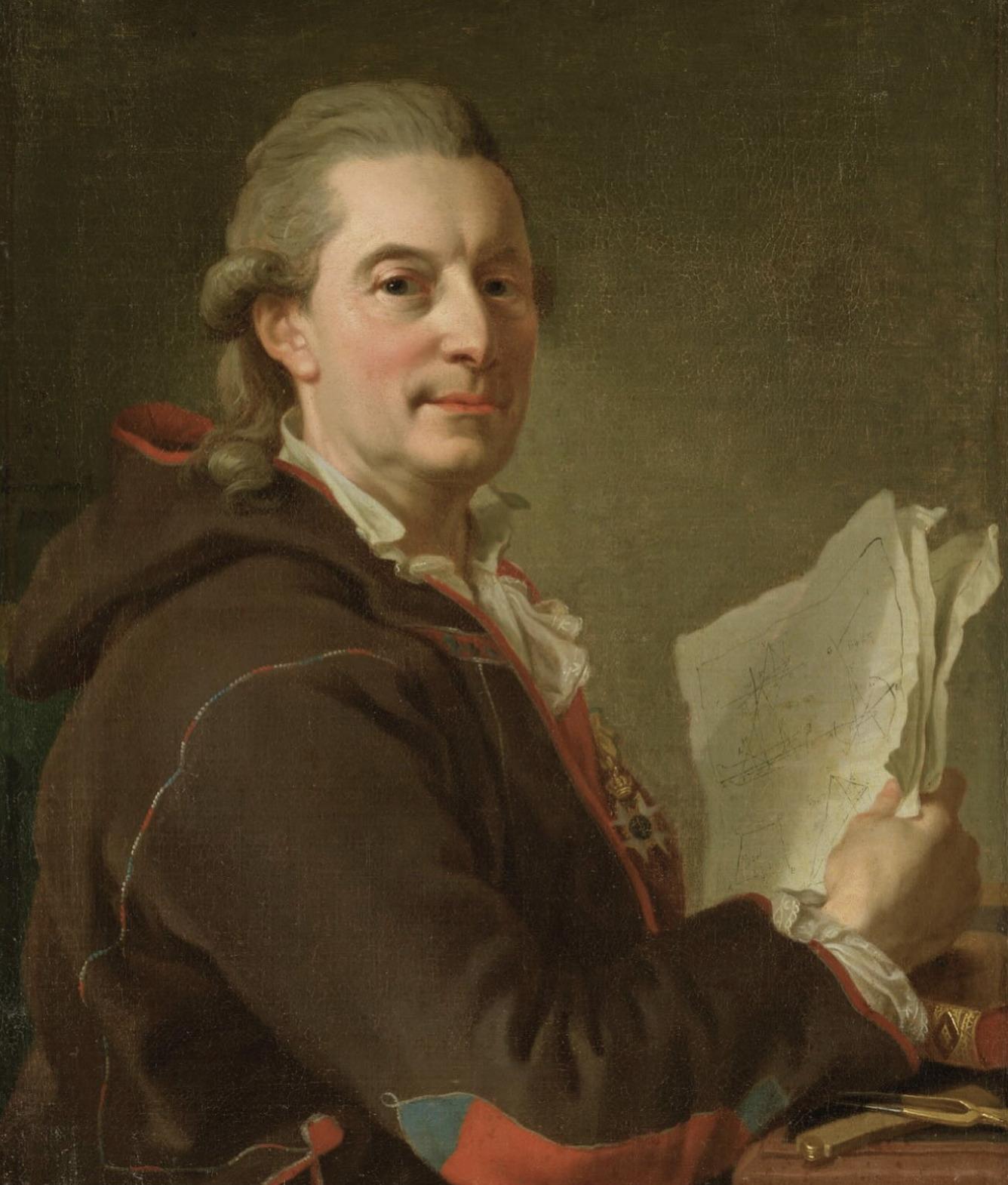
The collaboration of the artillery officer Augustin Ehrensvärd (1710–1772, left) and the innovative shipbuilder Fredrik Henrik af Chapman (1721–1808, right) made the development of the turuma and several other new types of vessels for the Swedish archipelago fleet.

The base of the archipelago fleet was initially traditional galleys, but the war of 1741–1743 and the war in Pomerania 1757–1762 had revealed some inherent weaknesses: their firepower was inadequate, they were inefficient in terms of manpower, had poor protection for the crew and were not particularly seaworthy. During the Pomeranian War "gun barges" (skottpråmar), heavily armed, oar-driven, flat-bottomed broadside vessels with a shallow draft, had been tried to compensate for the lack of firepower in the galleys, but had proven far too slow to be effective.

Ehrensvärd suggested that new archipelago vessels should be developed that combined sufficient firepower, maneuverability, seaworthiness and decent crew accommodations. He started a successful collaboration with shipbuilder and naval architect Fredrik Henrik Chapman (ennobled "af Chapman" in 1772) and together they developed five new vessels: a type of gunboat with a 12-pounder gun, schooner rigging and 7–8 pairs of oars, as well four types of "archipelago frigates" (skärgårdsfregatter): turuma, udema, pojama, and hemmema. These vessels were specifically designed for use in the archipelago off the south coast of Finland and were named after the Finnish provinces of Turunmaa, Uusimaa (Uudenmaan in genitive form), Pohjanmaa and Hämeenmaa (Tavastia).

All four types have been called "archipelago frigates" in Swedish and English historical literature, though the smaller udema and pojama have also been described as "archipelago corvettes".

== Design ==
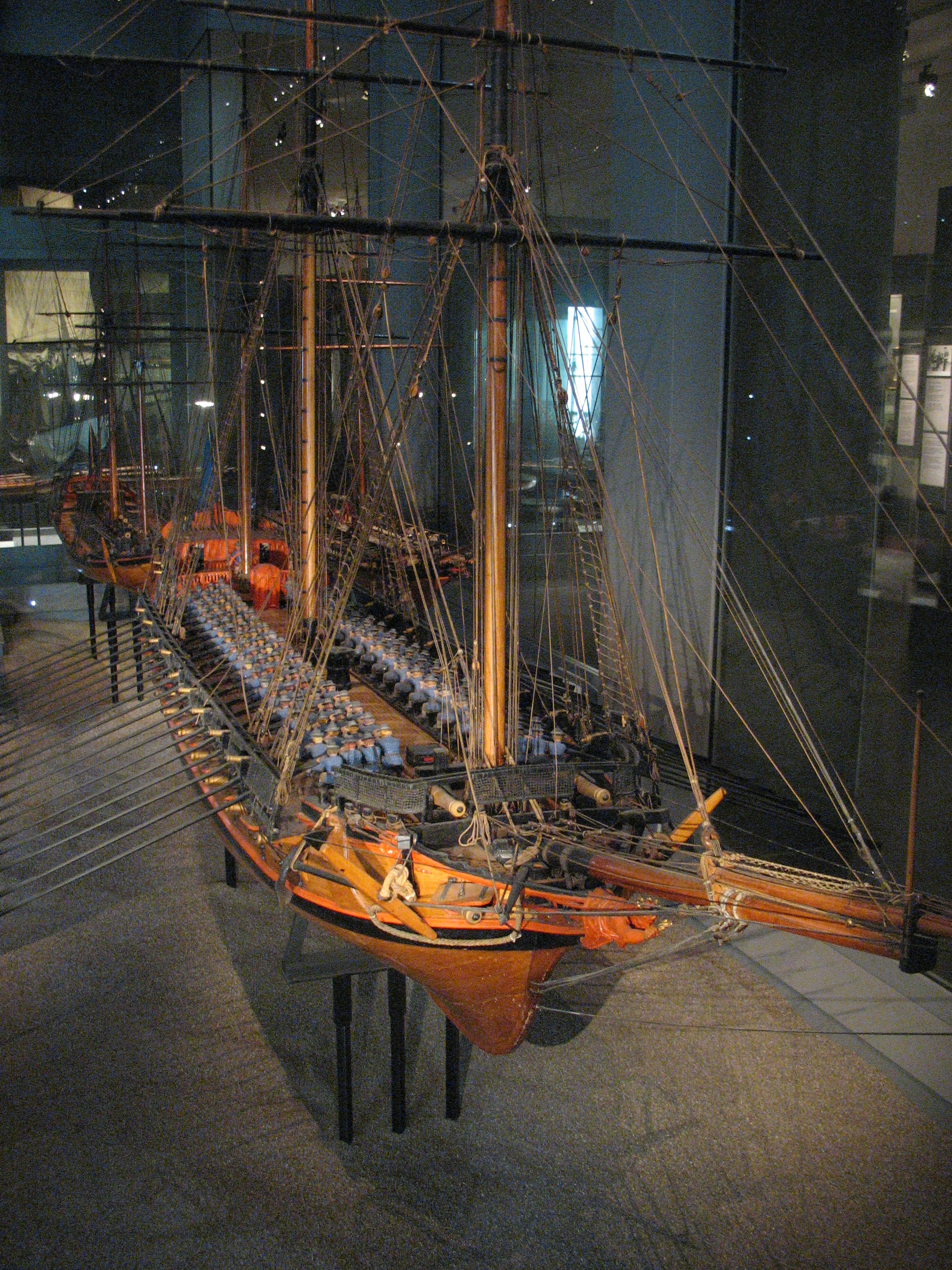
Contemporary model of the turuma Lodbrok at the Maritime Museum in Stockholm

The first turuma was completed in 1761. Along with the hemmema, it was the type of "archipelago frigate" that closest fit the description, showing considerable similarities with small ocean-going frigates. It had a low hull with no forecastle, only a low quarterdeck and no poop deck. It had three masts that were initially rigged with lateen sails, like a galley, which was later replaced with a conventional square frigate rig, but with combined top and topgallant masts. This improved its performance under sail and made it the best sailer in the archipelago fleet, though it was still slower than ordinary sailing vessels.

The first turuma, Norden, was c. 35 m (116 ft) long and 8 m (26.5 ft) wide with a draft of 3.3 m (11 ft). By the third ship, the Lodbrok (1771), the hull had been expanded to 38.5 m (126 ft) by 9.5 m (31 ft) and remained roughly the same. The armament was considerably heavier than that of the galleys, or the smaller udemas and pojomas. It had one full gundeck of 22 (24 in the ships built before 1790) 12-pounders in a regular broadside arrangement, firing through gunports. On the forecastle deck facing straight forward were two 18-pounders. For close-range action it carried another up to 24 3-pound swivel guns along the railings. In addition, there was also two 12-pound stern chasers.

For additional maneuverability, the turuma carried 19 pairs (16 in the first two ships) of oars with four men per oar. Oarsmen rowed sitting on the weather deck, above the gun deck, with the oarports attached to a rectangular outrigger that was designed to improve the leverage. Despite this, turumas performed poorly under oars and were very difficult to move in any kind of contrary wind. In calm weather the average speed with oars was reported as low as half a knot.

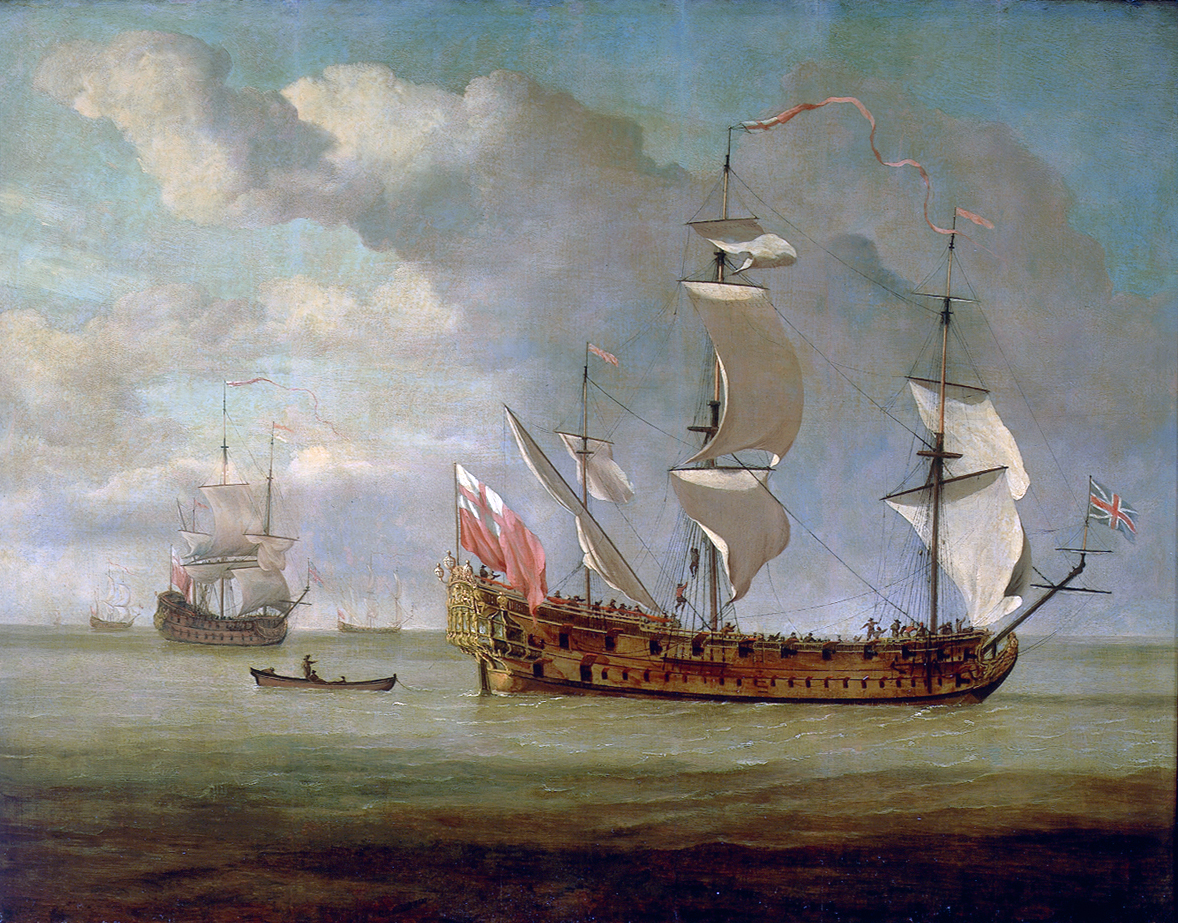
The Charles Galley, an oared frigate of the Royal Navy launched in 1676 that was a precursor of the hybrid turuma; contemporary painting by Willem van de Velde the Younger.

The turuma's design was very similar to one of the other types of archipelago frigates, the hemmema. The primary difference was that hemmemas were rowed from the gundeck, providing the oarsmen with better leverage by placing them closer to the waterline. The later hemmemas were also considerably larger, more heavily armed and of a more robust construction. Naval historian Jan Glete has gone as describing them as variations on the same type, especially when considering the pre-war designs. The crew varied between 220 and 266, depending on the model. Between 128 and 152 of these were required to man all the oars.

The concept of hybrid frigates with oar propulsion capabilities was not new. Small "galleasses" had been built for the English Tudor navy as early as the mid-16th century. The Royal Navy, its successor, later equipped the equivalent of sixth rates with oar ports on or below the gundeck as early as the 1660s. "Shebecks", Baltic variations on the Mediterranean xebecs, had been introduced in the Russian navy for inshore duties during the 18th century. Both of these have been suggested as possible inspirations for af Chapman's new designs. Though not identical to the Mediterranean-inspired vessel, the Russian navy considered turumas similar enough in function to their own "shebecks" to use this terminology when referring to Swedish prizes (captured ships).

=== Special-purpose ships ===
In 1777, Chapman designed a special turuma, the royal yacht Amphion. It was 33.5 m (110 ft) long and 6.8 m (22.25 ft) wide and was schooner-rigged with only two masts (later changed to a brigantine rig). Chapman intended for the craft to carry a broadside armament similar to that of the regular turumas, but this was rejected by Gustav who ordered the craft to be built with an armament consisting of only light swivel guns. Amphion was decorated in the more stringent version of Rococo that in Sweden is defined as "Gustavian", and was fitted with a great cabin with a skylight that was well-suited for royal audiences and conferences. Amphion served as Gustav III's staff ship in the war of 1788–1790, but was such a poor sailer that the king and his retinue abandoned it during the dramatic escape from Vyborg Bay in 1790.

== Service ==
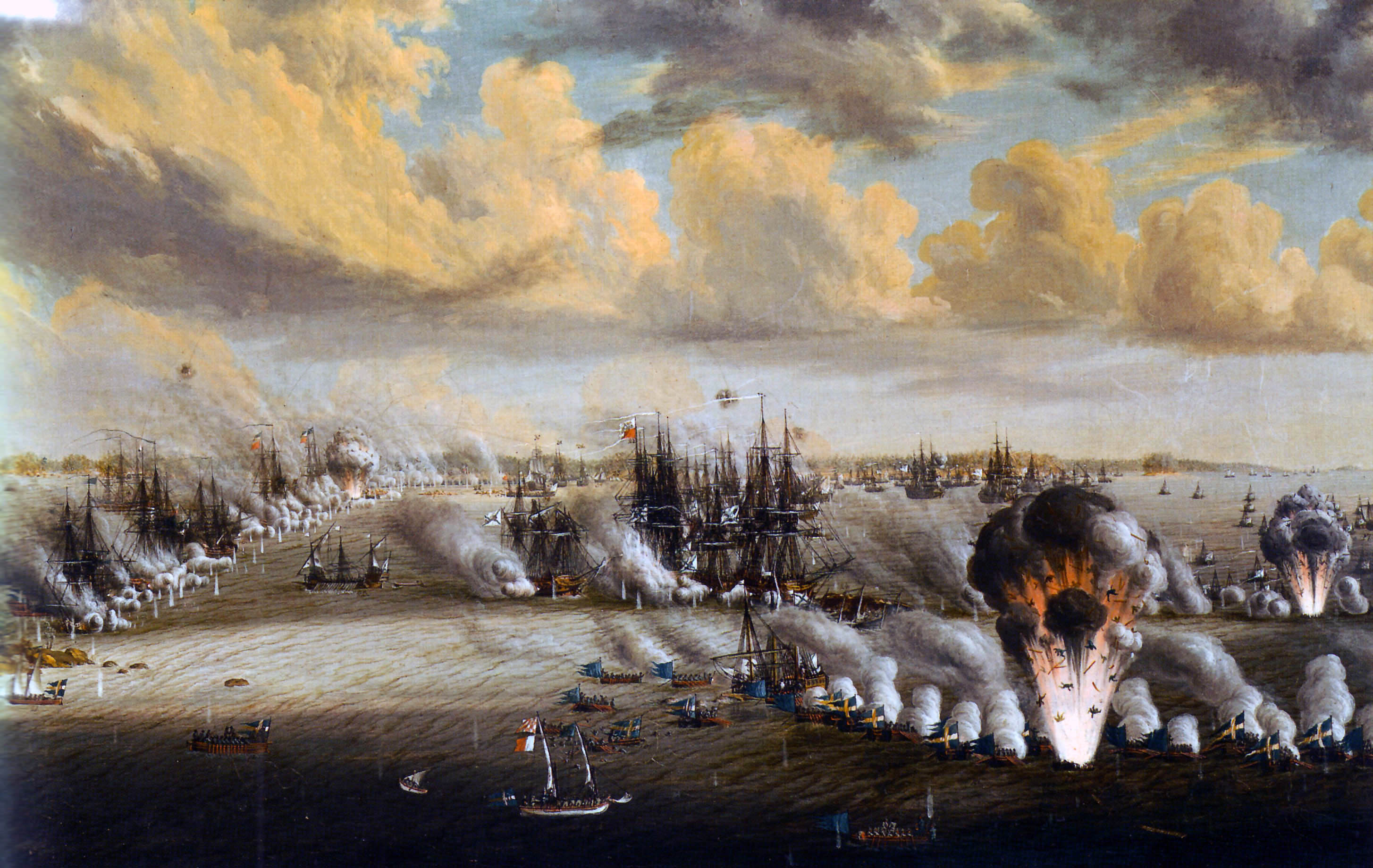
Contemporary Swedish painting of the battle of Svensksund where one turuma participated

Seven turumas were built for the Swedish navy before the Russian war of 1788–1790, and another six were complete during the war, with one more built after 1790. Altogether fourteen turumas were completed, making it the most common of the four archipelago frigate types. At the outbreak of war in 1788, they formed the core of the archipelago flotilla in Finland. They were used to support amphibious operations and to conduct raids on the Russian archipelago fleet, while at the same time acting as a sea-borne flank support for the Swedish army on the Finnish mainland. Turumas fought in both the first and second battles of Svensksund. In the first in August 1789, six turumas made up the bulk of the firepower of the larger Swedish vessels, while at the second in July 1790, it was reduced to just one ship.

Like the other specialized archipelago vessels, the turuma had only limited advantages. While it had superior firepower, its sailing qualities were only average and they were slow under oars. It had the potential to be an effective weapon against galleys, matching their forward firepower and severely outgunning them with its broadside armament. Inside an enemy galley formation, it could wreak considerable havoc, but such a maneuver was never achieved in an actual battle, leaving that tactical role untested. Like the hemmema, the turuma was effective in defensive formations, but lacked the mobility that was often needed in offensive archipelago warfare. In 1790, after the war ended, two were converted into hospital ships. The second battle of Svensksund had clearly showed that the smaller and nimble gunboats and gunsloops were far more efficient in coastal warfare and had all but displaced "archipelago frigates" in the inshore squadrons by the Finnish War of 1808–09.

== Ships ==
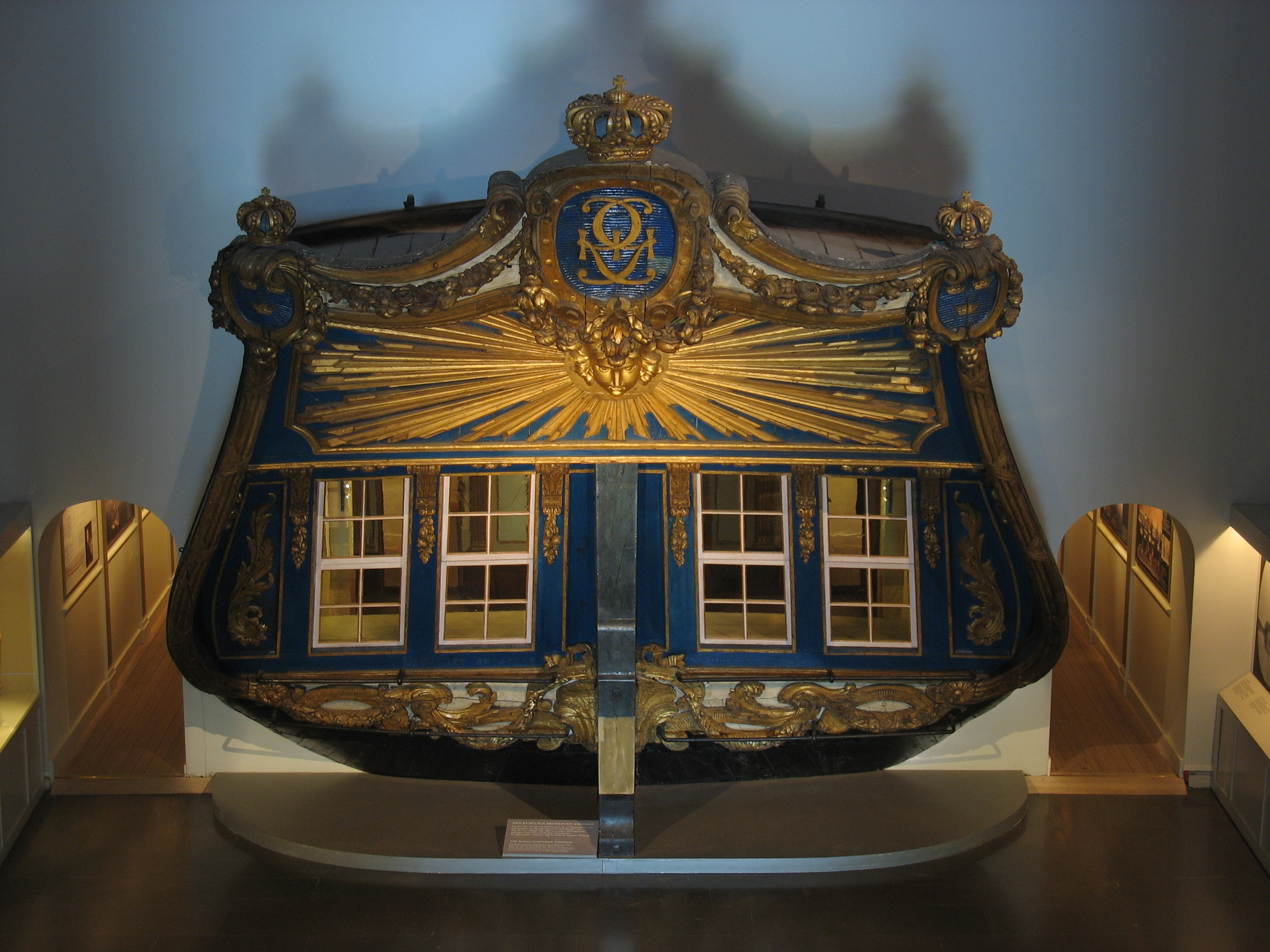
The preserved stern of the Amphion, a modified version of a turuma designed as a pleasure craft for King Gustav III which served as his staff ship during the war

Fourteen or fifteen turumas were built for the Swedish archipelago fleet. All vessels except Amphion are listed below along with the basic information to the extent it has been recorded. Specifications that are identical to vessels listed directly above are marked with a dash. Three "shebecks" were also built for the Russian Baltic fleet in 1788–89 that were based directly on the turumas rather than the Mediterranean xebecs.

Swedish-built vessels
Name	Shipyard	Launched	Size (meters)	Size (feet)	Pairs of oars	Armament	Fate
Norden	Stralsund	1761	length: 34.4 width: 7.9 draft: 2.2	length: 113 width: 26 draft: 7.2	16	22 × 12-pounders 10 × 3-pounders 24 swivel guns	Written off 1790.
Tor	Sveaborg	1764	length: 35.6 width: 8.9 draft: 3.3	length: 117 width: 29 draft: 10.8	19	24 × 12-pounders 2 × 18-pounders 22 swivel guns	Written off in 1776 according to Nikula. According to Berg and Tredrea & Sozaev it was renamed Sällan Värre (see below) in 1770 and is actually the previous incarnation of that vessel.
Lodbrok	Stockholm	1771	—	—	—	—	Rebuilt as a hospital ship in 1790. Written off in 1806.
Björn Järnsida	Karlskrona	1774	—	—	—	—	Captured at the first battle of Svensksund in 1789 (rendered as Biorn Ernsida). Sunk to block the entrance to Kronshtadt in 1808.
Ragvald	Karlskrona	1774	—	—	—	—	Captured at the first battle of Svensksund in 1789 (rendered as Rogvald) and last mentioned in 1791.
Sigurd Ormöga	Karlskrona	1774	length: 37.3 width: 9.2 draft: 3.3	length: 122.5 width: 30 draft: 10.8	19	24 × 12-pounders 2 × 18-pounders 22 swivel guns	Sold 1799.
Sällan Värre	Karlskrona	1774	length: 37.4 width: 9.2 draft: 3.3	length: 122.7 width: 30 draft: 10.8	19	24 × 12-pounders 2 × 18-pounders 22 swivel guns	Captured at the surrender of Sveaborg in 1808 according to Berg. According to Tredrea & Sozaev it was Captured by the Russians at first battle of Svensksund in 1789 and recaptured by the Swedes on 4 May 1790. Possibly the same vessel as the 1764 Tor.
Ivar Benlös	Sveaborg?	1775	—	—	—	—	Refitted as hospital ship 1790. Captured at Sveaborg 1808.
Birger Jarl	Sveaborg	1790	unspecified	unspecified	22	22 × 12-pounders 2 × 18-pounders 4 swivel guns	Captured at Sveaborg 1808.
Erik Segersäll	Sveaborg	1790	—	—	—	—	Captured at Sveaborg 1808.
Frej	Sveaborg	1790	—	—	—	—	Captured at Sveaborg 1808.
Ivar Vitsärk	Sveaborg	1790	—	—	—	—	Captured at Sveaborg 1808.
Tor	Sveaborg	1790	—	—	—	—	Captured at Sveaborg 1808.
Yngve	Sveaborg	1790	—	—	—	—	Rebuilt 1784. Captured at Sveaborg 1808.

Russian-built vessels
Name	Shipyard	Launched	Size (meters)	Size (feet)	Pairs of oars	Armament	Fate
Skoraia	Saint Petersburg galley yard	1789	length: 36,6 width: 9.2 draft: 2.5	length: 120 width: 30 draft: 8.2	20	20 × 12-pounders 4 × 18-pounders 22 × 3-pounders	Rebuilt as floating battery and renamed Krepkaia in 1792. Unknown final fate.
Legkaia	Saint Petersburg galley yard	1789	—	—	—	—	Rebuilt as floating battery and renamed Khrabraia in 1792. Unknown final fate.
Bystraia	Saint Petersburg galley yard	1789	—	—	—	—	Rebuilt as floating battery and renamed Svirepaia in 1792. Unknown final fate.

== See also ==
- Hemmema
- Pojama
- Udema
