= Udema =

Type of Swedish warship

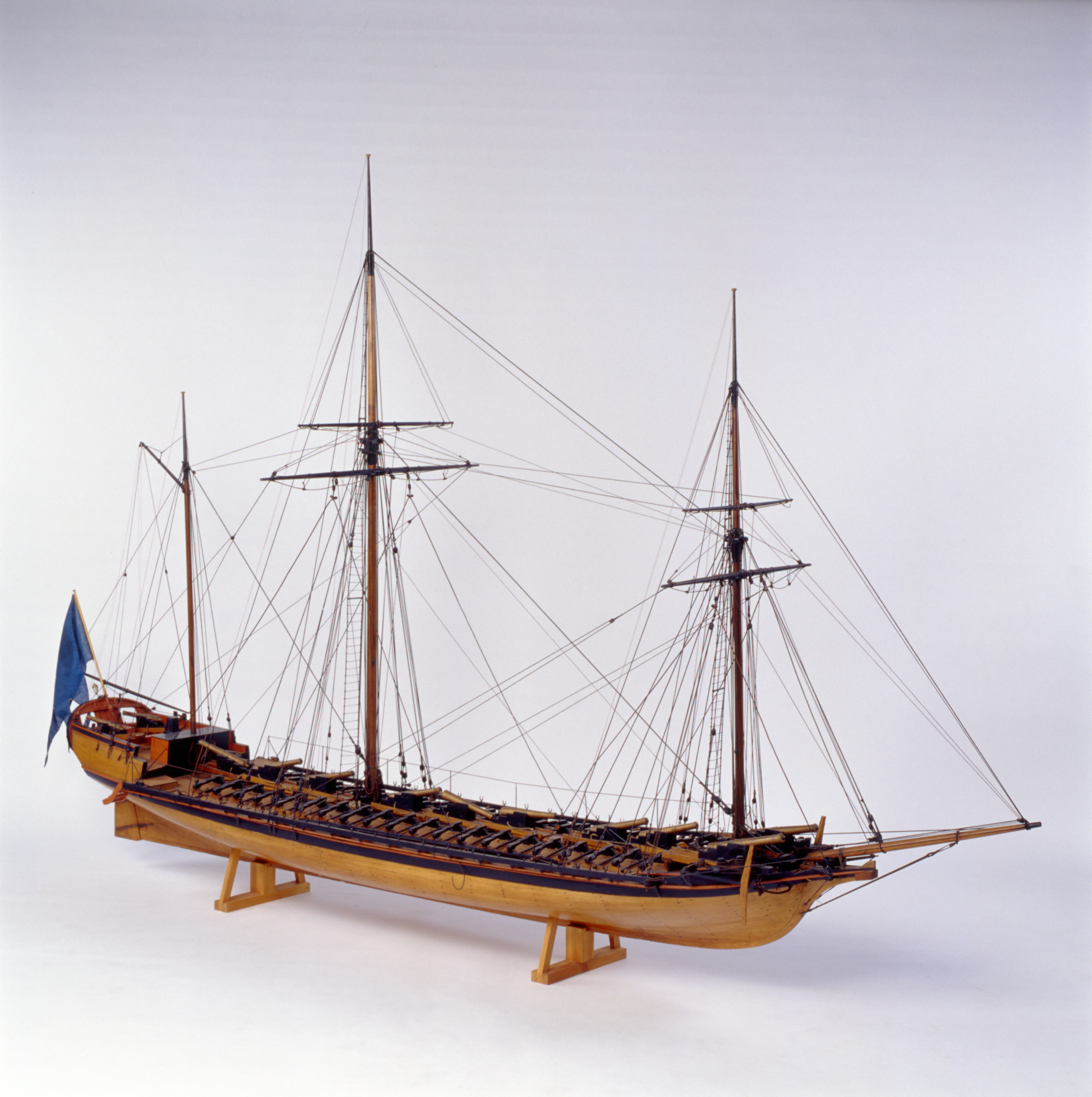
A contemporary model of the udema Ingeborg (built in 1776) from the collections of the Maritime Museum in Stockholm

An udema (Swedish pronunciation: [ˈʉ̌ːdɛma]), also udenma, was a type of warship built for the Swedish archipelago fleet in the late 18th and early 19th centuries. It was developed for warfare in the Archipelago Sea in the Baltic and along the coasts of Svealand and Finland against the Russian navy. The udema was designed by the prolific naval architect Fredrik Henrik af Chapman for use in an area of mostly shallow waters and groups of islands and islets that extend from Stockholm all the way to the Gulf of Finland.

The udema was of an innovative new design with a single line of guns along the ship's centerline, a foreshadowing of the dreadnought battleships of the early 20th century. The design proved impractical for its time, however, and only three udemas were built between 1760 and 1776.

== Background ==
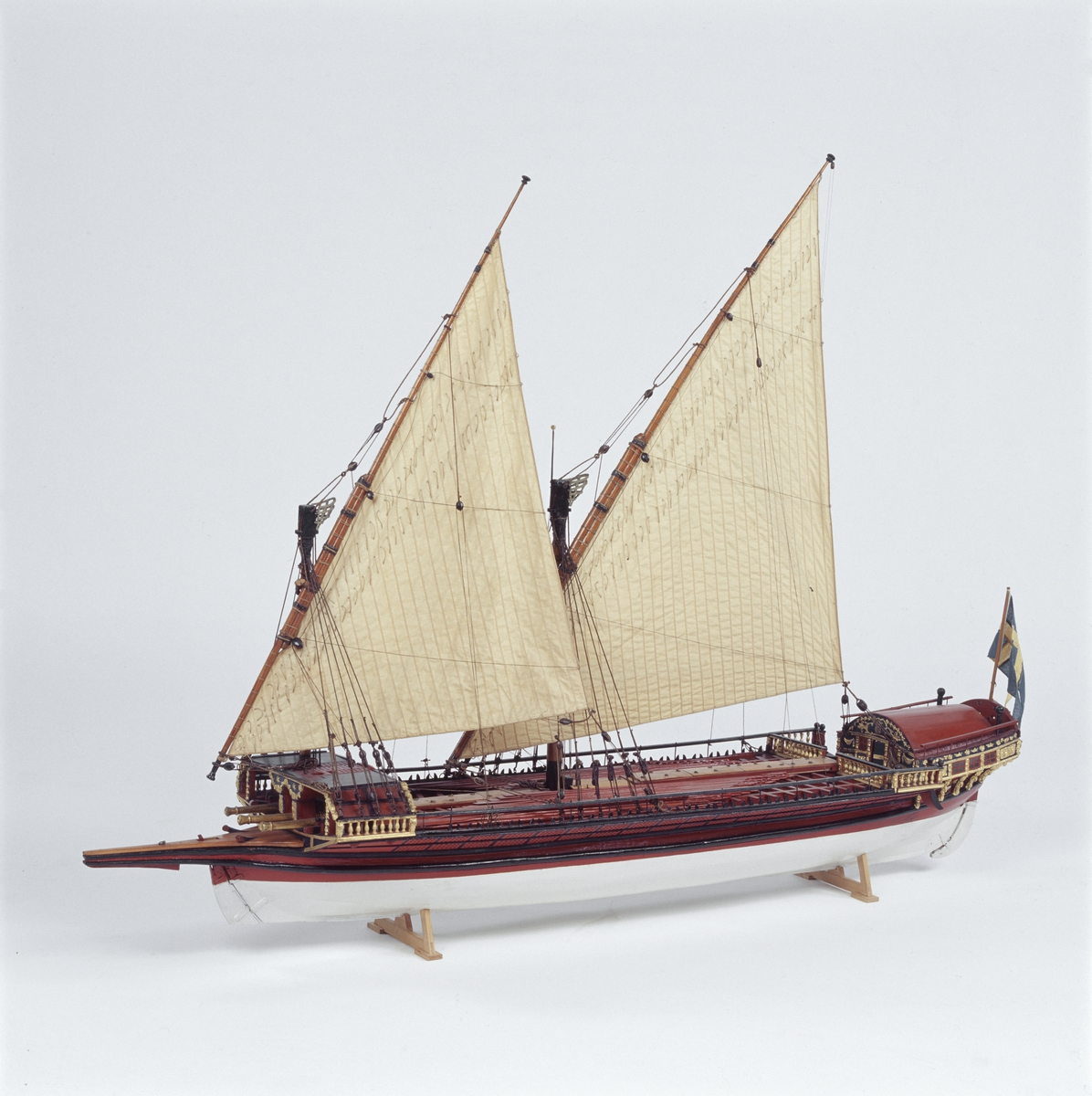
Contemporary model of an early 18th-century Swedish galley from the collections of the Maritime Museum in Stockholm. Small galleys like this one were a mainstay of the first Swedish coastal fleets.

In the early 18th century, the establishment of Russian naval power in the Baltic Sea challenged the interests of Sweden, one of the major powers in the Baltic. The Swedish Empire at the time included territory in Northern Germany, all of modern Finland and most of the Baltic states, a dominion held together by the Baltic sea routes. Russian Tsar Peter the Great had established a new capital and naval base in Saint Petersburg in 1703. During the Great Northern War Sweden lost its Baltic state territories, and suffered from Russian raiding in Finland and along the chain of islands and archipelagos that stretched all the way from the Gulf of Finland to the capital of Stockholm. The Swedes began building inshore flotillas of shallow-draft vessels, beginning with smaller versions of the traditional Mediterranean warships, the galleys. Most of these were more akin to galiots and were complemented with gun prams. The disastrous war with Russia (1741–1743) and the minor involvement in Prussia in the Seven Years' War (1757–1762) showed the need for further expansion and development of the inshore flotillas with more specialized vessels.

Traditional galleys were effective as troop transports for amphibious operations, but were severely under-gunned, especially in relation to their large crews; a galley with a 250-man crew, most of whom were rowers, would typically be armed with only one 24-pounder cannon and two 6-pounders, all in the bow. However, they were undecked and lacked adequate shelter for the rower-soldiers, great numbers of which succumbed to illness in the war of 1741–1743. The Swedish military invested heavily in an "archipelago fleet" (skärgårdsflottan), a separate branch of the armed forces that organizationally belonged to the army. In 1756, it was even officially designated Arméns flotta, "Navy of the Army". It was in many ways a highly independent organization that attracted a social and cultural elite and enjoyed the protection of Gustav III after his 1772 coup that empowered him as an absolute monarch.

Several new ships were designed by the naval architect Fredrik Henrik af Chapman to bolster the hitting-power of the new Swedish maritime forces, to provide it with better naval defense and to improve its fire support capabilities during amphibious operations. The result was four new vessels that combined the maneuverability of oar-powered galleys with the superior rigs and more comfortable living conditions of sailing ships: the udema, pojama, turuma and hemmema, named after the Finnish regions of Uusimaa ("Uudenmaan" in genitive form), Pohjanmaa, Turunmaa and Hämeenmaa (Tavastia). All four have been referred to as skärgårdsfregatter, "archipelago frigates", in Swedish and English historical literature, though the smaller udema and pojama were also described as "archipelago corvettes" originally.

== Design ==
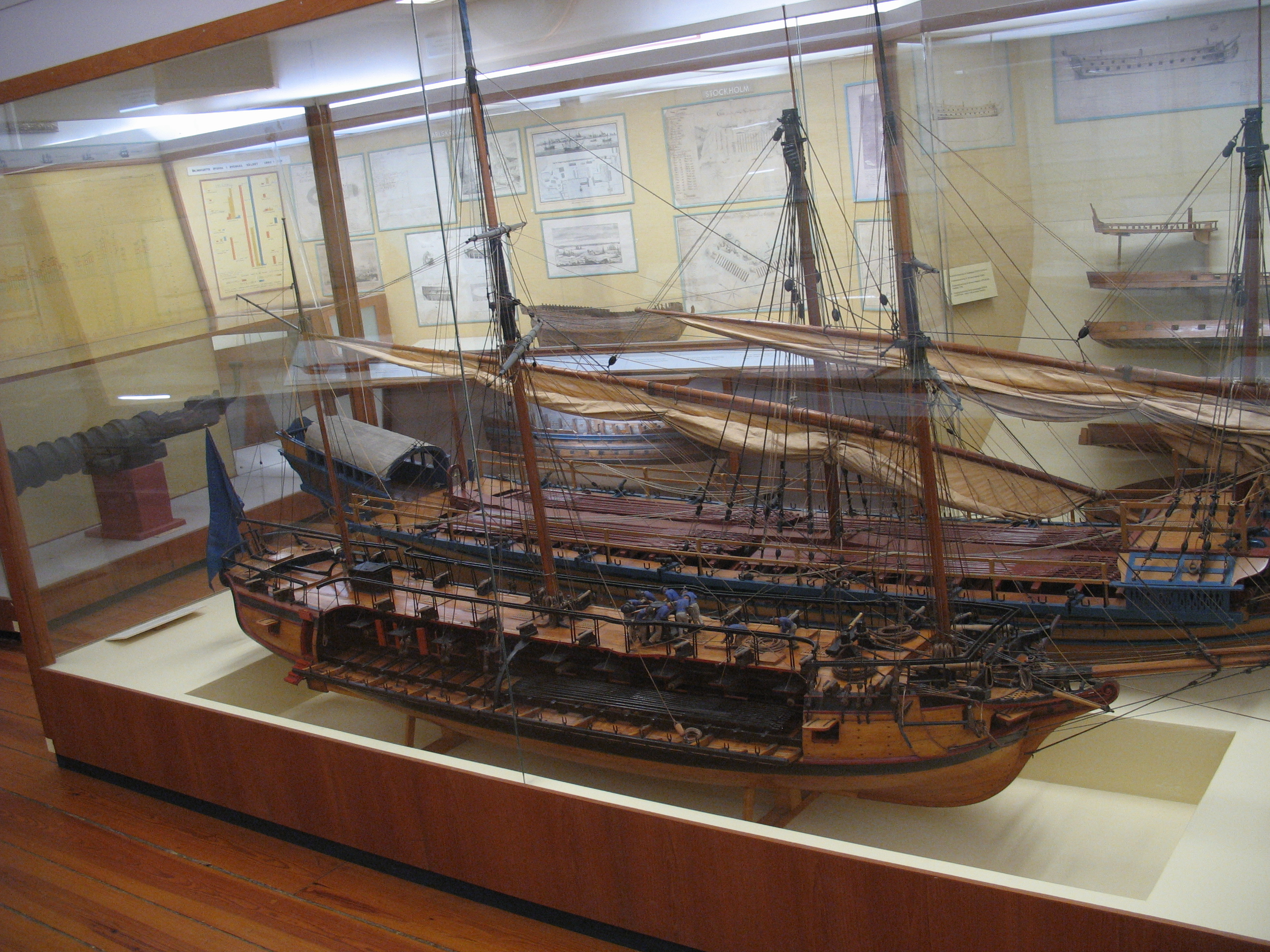
Contemporary model of the udema Thorborg (built in 1772) at the Maritime Museum in Stockholm. The centerline armament of the Thorborg was housed under a deck structure that covered the guns while leaving the rowing positions open to the elements.

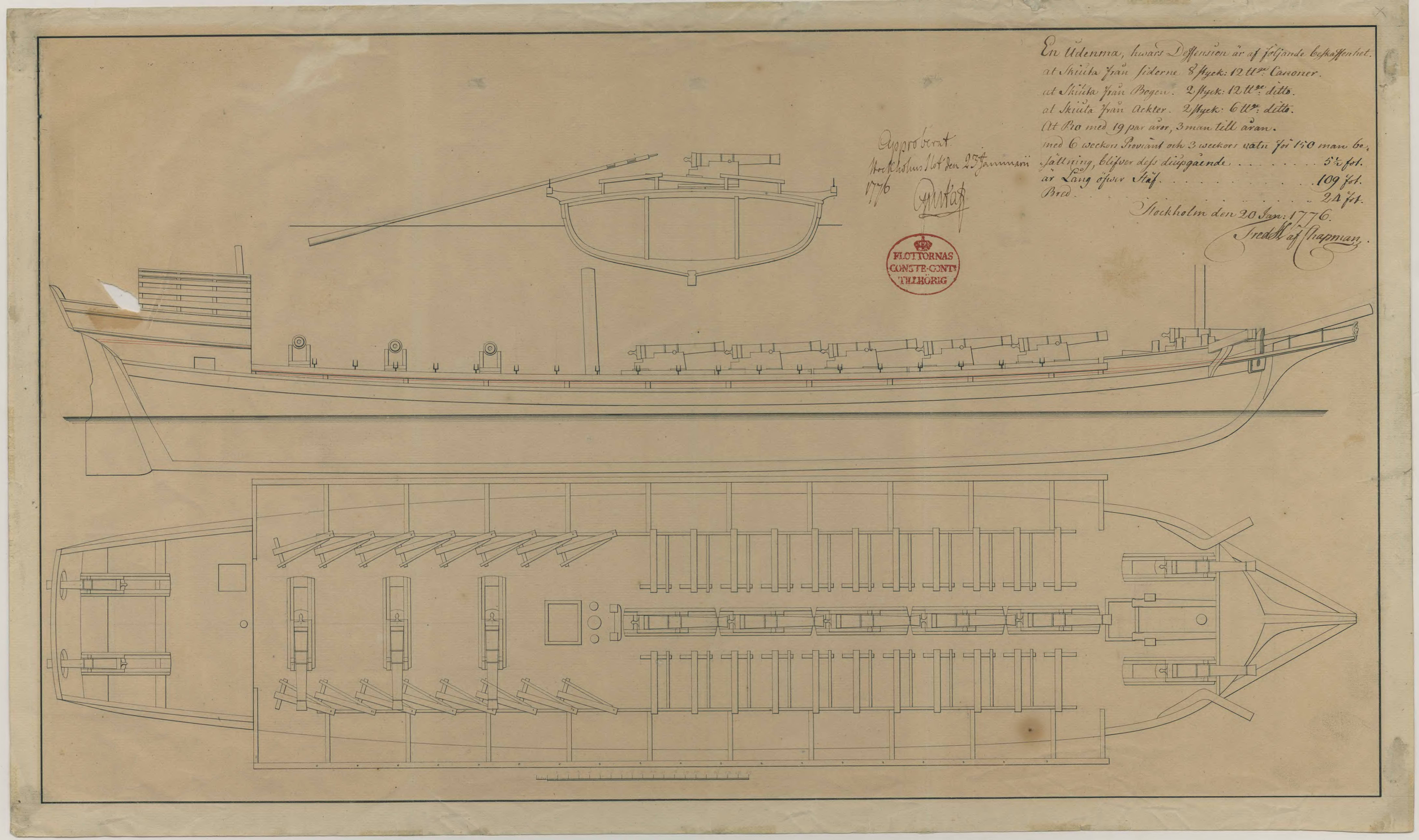
Chapman's construction drawing of the Udema ship type. A note on the drawing shows it has been approved by King Gustav III.

The first udema was built in 1760 and had two masts (mainmast and foremast) that were originally rigged with lateen sails. It was later provided with a square sail rig similar to that of a polacca bark without topgallant sails. It had a low hull with a small quarterdeck structure and an arrangement of guns that was unique for its time. Its main armament consisted of a single line of eight 12-pound guns along the centerline of the ship and two 12-pounders in the bow facing forwards. The centerline guns used pivoting carriages that could be rotated 360 degrees and aimed to either side of the ship, similar to the main guns of the dreadnought battleships of the 20th century.

The first udema Gamla was c. 30 m (100 ft) long and with a draft of 1.5 m (5 ft). The later udemas, Torborg and Ingeborg, carried a mizzen mast, and were both longer and wider, 37 m (121 ft) long and almost 9 m (29 ft) wide with a draft of just over 3 m (10 ft). Torborg, built in 1772, had three additional 12-pounders, eleven in the centerline and two in the bow facing forwards, housed under a decked superstructure with gun ports, but with the rowing seats left undecked. This arrangement proved to be less successful with reports about problems with splintering and lingering gunpowder smoke. She was also a poor sailer and slow under oars, earning the udema a poor reputation.

The Ingeborg, built in 1776, had an eight-12-pounder centerline armament which was open to the elements, but two heavy 18-pounders in the bow and two 6-pounder chase guns in the stern. The rowing benches with room for three men per bench were on either side of the centerline battery, but had to swing forwards and outwards to allow the guns to pivot to either side.

For additional maneuverability, the udema carried 14 to 18 pairs of oars. Rowers sat on the weather deck on either side of the main armament with the oar ports placed on a rectangular outrigger which improved their leverage. However, they were positioned on either side of the centerline battery and could not row under fire; in action, the udema had to rely on its sails for propulsion.

The concept of hybrid frigates with oar propulsion capabilities was not new. Small "galleasses" had been built for the English Tudor navy as early as the mid-16th century. The Royal Navy, its successor, later equipped the equivalent of sixth rates with oar ports on or below the gundeck as early as the 1660s. "Shebecks", Baltic variations on the Mediterranean xebecs, had been introduced in the Russian navy for inshore duties during the 18th century. Both of these have been suggested as possible inspirations for af Chapman's new designs.

== Service ==
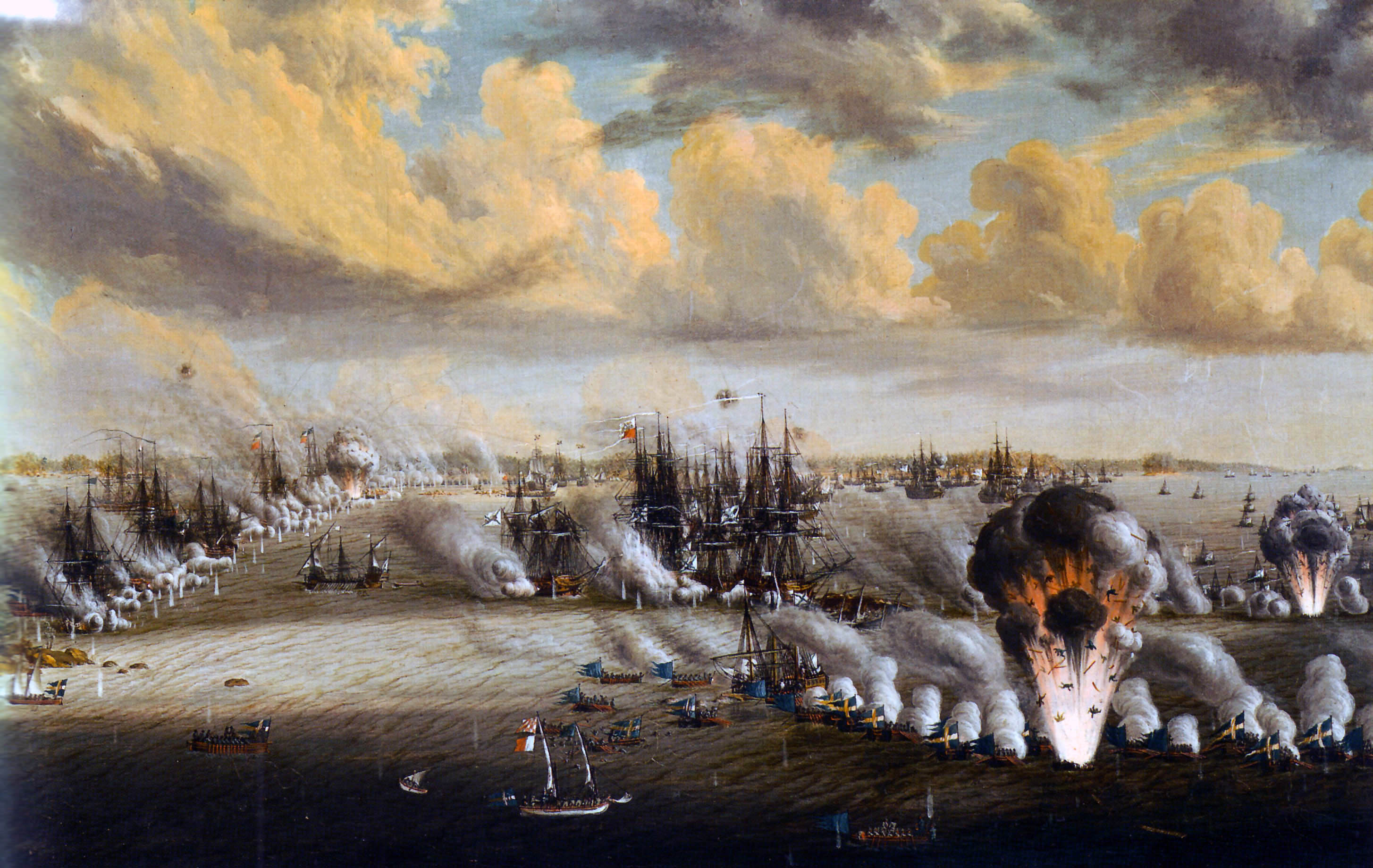
Contemporary Swedish painting of the Battle of Svensksund where an udema was one of the few Swedish vessels lost

Only three udemas were built for the Swedish navy. Russian ship builders copied the Swedish designs, particularly around the time of the war of 1788–1790, and it is believed by some historians that a type named simply "secret vessel" could have been a Russian udema. Other historians question this conclusion; the number of guns (44 in total) may suggest a considerably larger turuma, one of the larger "archipelago frigates".

The three Swedish udemas served in the Finnish archipelago squadrons throughout the war of 1788–1790 by supporting amphibious operations, raiding the opposing Russian archipelago fleet, and protecting the left flank of the Swedish army's operations on the Finnish mainland. Udemas fought in both the First and Second Battles of Svensksund. The latter battle, one of the largest naval battles ever fought, was a disastrous defeat for the Russians and one of Sweden's greatest naval victories ever; the udema Ingeborg was among the few Swedish vessels lost.

Like the other specialized archipelago vessels, the udema proved to have only limited advantages. While it had superior firepower, its sailing qualities were poor, even compared with galleys, and were slow even under oars. The unconventional artillery layout was also deemed to be too weak and radical. The Second Battle of Svensksund showed that the smaller gunboats and gunsloops were far more efficient for the same operations and had almost entirely replaced the "archipelago frigates" by the Finnish War of 1808–09, where Sweden finally lost all of its Finnish possessions.

== Influence ==
Historian Lars-Olof Berg suggests that the radical new design of rotating gun mounts, though somewhat of a disappointment in Swedish service, may have influenced shipbuilders in other countries. Russian floating batteries were equipped with similar mounts by 1790. Designs were also presented and built in Great Britain and the US. Pivoting mounts were used in the US "gunboat navy" under Thomas Jefferson, even in much smaller craft, though they often proved risky since the recoil could destabilize vessels with a small displacement, especially if the guns were fired over the side. The genuine breakthrough for true centerline armament layouts, however, did not come until the advent of armored steamships in the late 19th century. The name "udema" has been carried on in the uninflected Finnish form Uusimaa for 20th century ships of the Finnish navy.

== Ships ==
Only three udemas were built, all of them for the Swedish archipelago fleet. They are listed in the table below with basic information where it is actually known.

Name	Shipyard	Launched	Size (meters)	Size (feet)	Pairs of oars	Armament	Fate
Gamla Udema ("Old Udema") or Uusimaa	Stralsund	1760	length: 30.3 width: 1.5 draft: 1.5	l: 110 w: 5 d: 5	14	9 or 10 × 12-pounders 2 × 3-pounders	
Torborg	Stockholm	1772	length: 36 width: 8.6 draft: 3.1	l: 120 w: 28.5 d: 10	20	2 × 18-pounders 13 × 12-pounders 24 swivel guns	
Ingeborg	Stockholm	1776	length: 36 width: 8.6 draft: 3.1	l: 120 w: 28.5 d: 10	20	2 × 18-pounders 8 × 12-pounders 2 × 6-pounders	Sank at the Battle of Svensksund 1790.

== See also ==
- hemmema
- pojama
- turuma
