= Pohjanmaa-class =

Pohjanmaa-class may refer to:

- Pohjanmaa-class corvette
- Pohjanmaa-class minelayer
