= Pohjanmaa =

Pohjanmaa (Swedish: Österbotten, English: Ostrobothnia) may refer to:

== Regions ==
- Pohjanmaa or Ostrobothnia (historical province), a traditional region (landskap) in Finland
- Pohjanmaan lääni or Ostrobothnia County, a county of Sweden from 1634 to 1775
- Modern regions:
  - Pohjanmaan maakunta or Ostrobothnia (administrative region), a region of Finland
  - Pohjois-Pohjanmaan maakunta or North Ostrobothnia, a region of Finland
  - Etelä-Pohjanmaan maakunta or South Ostrobothnia, a region of Finland
  - Keski-Pohjanmaan maakunta or Central Ostrobothnia, a region of Finland

== Ships ==
- Pohjanmaa or Pojama, a type of Swedish warship in the late 18th and early 19th centuries
- Finnish minelayer Pohjanmaa, a former flagship of the Finnish Navy
- Pohjanmaa-class corvette, an upcoming surface combatant class of the Finnish Navy

== See also ==
- Ostrobothnia (disambiguation)
