= Bothnia (disambiguation) =

Bothnia or Bothnian may refer to:

- Gulf of Bothnia, a gulf of the Baltic Sea between Sweden and Finland
  - Bothnian Bay, the northernmost waters of the gulf
  - Bothnian Sea, the southernmost waters of the gulf
- Provinces in Sweden and Finland named after the gulf:
  - Ostrobothnia (disambiguation), multiple entities
  - West Bothnia, located west of the gulf
  - North Bothnia, located northwest of the gulf
- "Rear Bothnia", or Peräpohjola, southern part of Finnish Lapland
- SS Bothnia (1874), transatlantic steamship (1874–99)
- SS Bothnia (1895), steam barge
- Bothnia Line, high speed railway in northern Sweden
- Bothnian Highway, a main road between Kaskinen and Seinäjoki

== Similar spellings ==
- Bosnia
- Boothia (disambiguation)
