= Experiment of Leith =

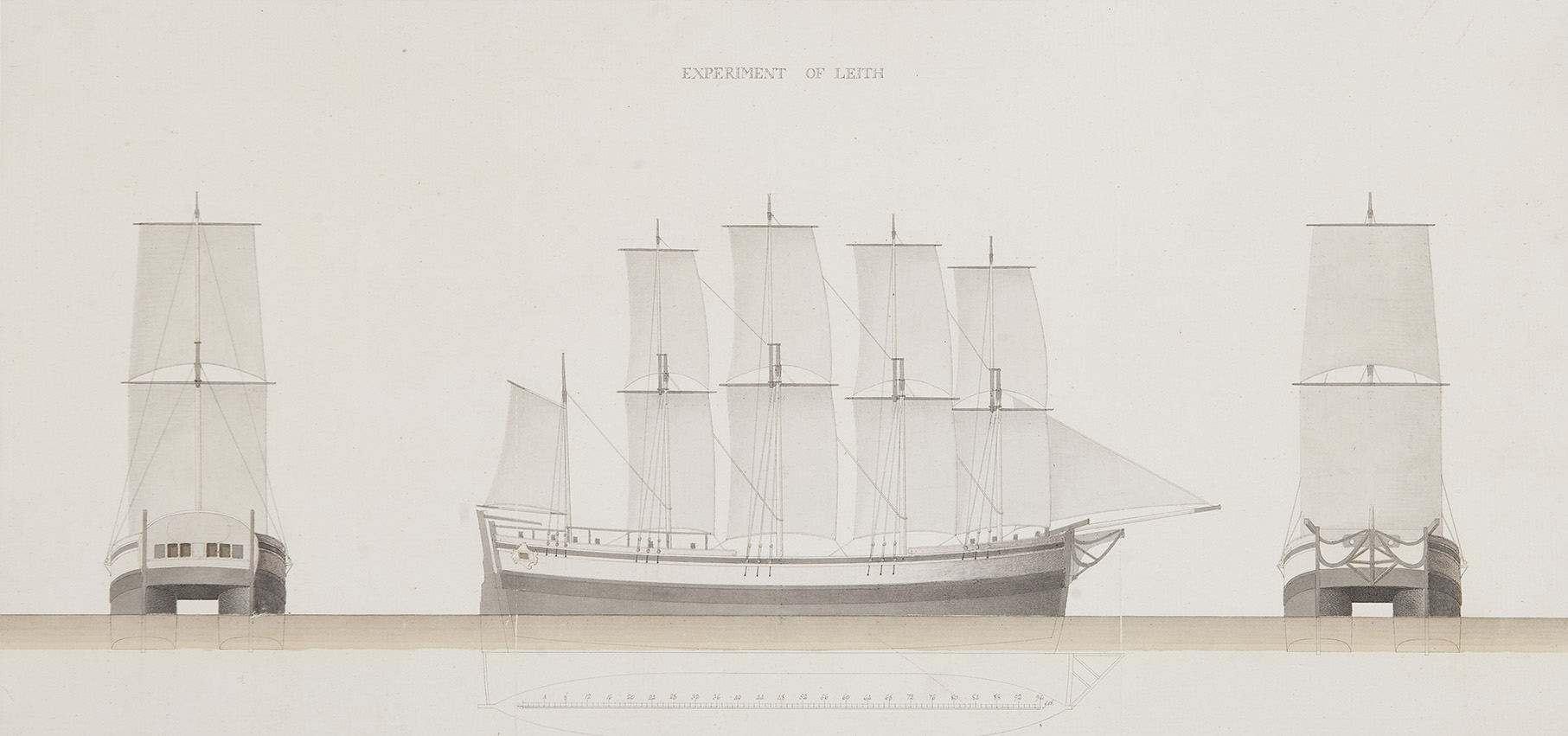
Experiment of Leith

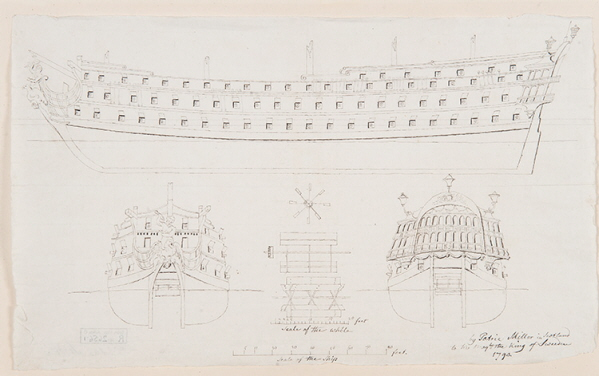
Experiment of Leith was a prototype for a larger ship that was never built, Sjöspöket or The Sea-Spook

Experiment of Leith was a catamaran engineered by the Scottish banker Patrick Miller of Dalswinton, to be used by the Swedish fleet in the Russo-Swedish War (1788-90). By the time the ship reached Stockholm the war was, however, already over.

== The ship ==
The ship had five masts, and the two hulls were each 32 metres long and 3.7 metres wide. In the absence of wind it could be driven by four or five paddlewheels powered by a capstan. Predating the marine implementation of steam power by a few decades the ship was thus powered manually by the crew and was reported to have reached 4.3 knots.

Experiment of Leith was anchored to the east of the island of Skeppsholmen in Stockholm where it remained for over four years until it was sunk in 1794 in order to form part of the foundation for a bridge.

The ship was a smaller version of one of Miller's earlier plans for a warship, which had been referred to by Swedish naval architect Fredrik Henrik af Chapman as the "Sea-Spook".

== The golden box ==
In return for the ship the king of Sweden, Gustavus III, gave Miller a golden box. It was the size of a snuff box and is kept today at the Victoria and Albert Museum together with the letter of thanks from the Swedish king, dated 20 May 1791.

The box contained swede seeds which Miller planted, and which are said to have started the Scottish taste for turnips or "neeps", eaten for example as a classic side to the national dish haggis.
