= Adam Rolland =

Scottish judge and philanthropist

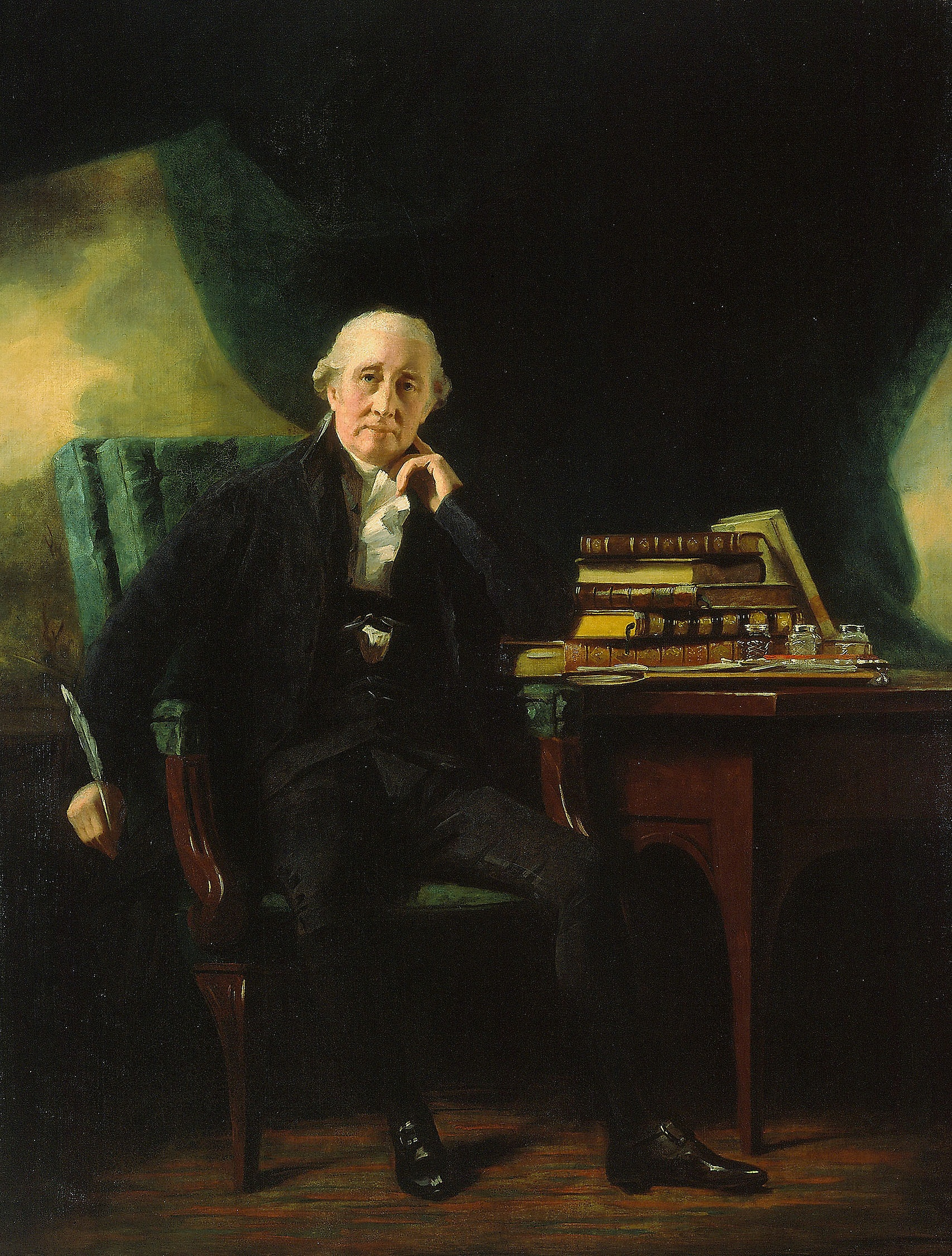
Portrait, 1800-1810

Adam Rolland of Gask FRSE (1734–1819) was a Scottish judge and philanthropist. He was co-founder of the Royal Society of Edinburgh, personal friend of Lord Melbourne and the basis of the character of Paul Pleydell in the novel Guy Mannering by Sir Walter Scott.

== Life ==
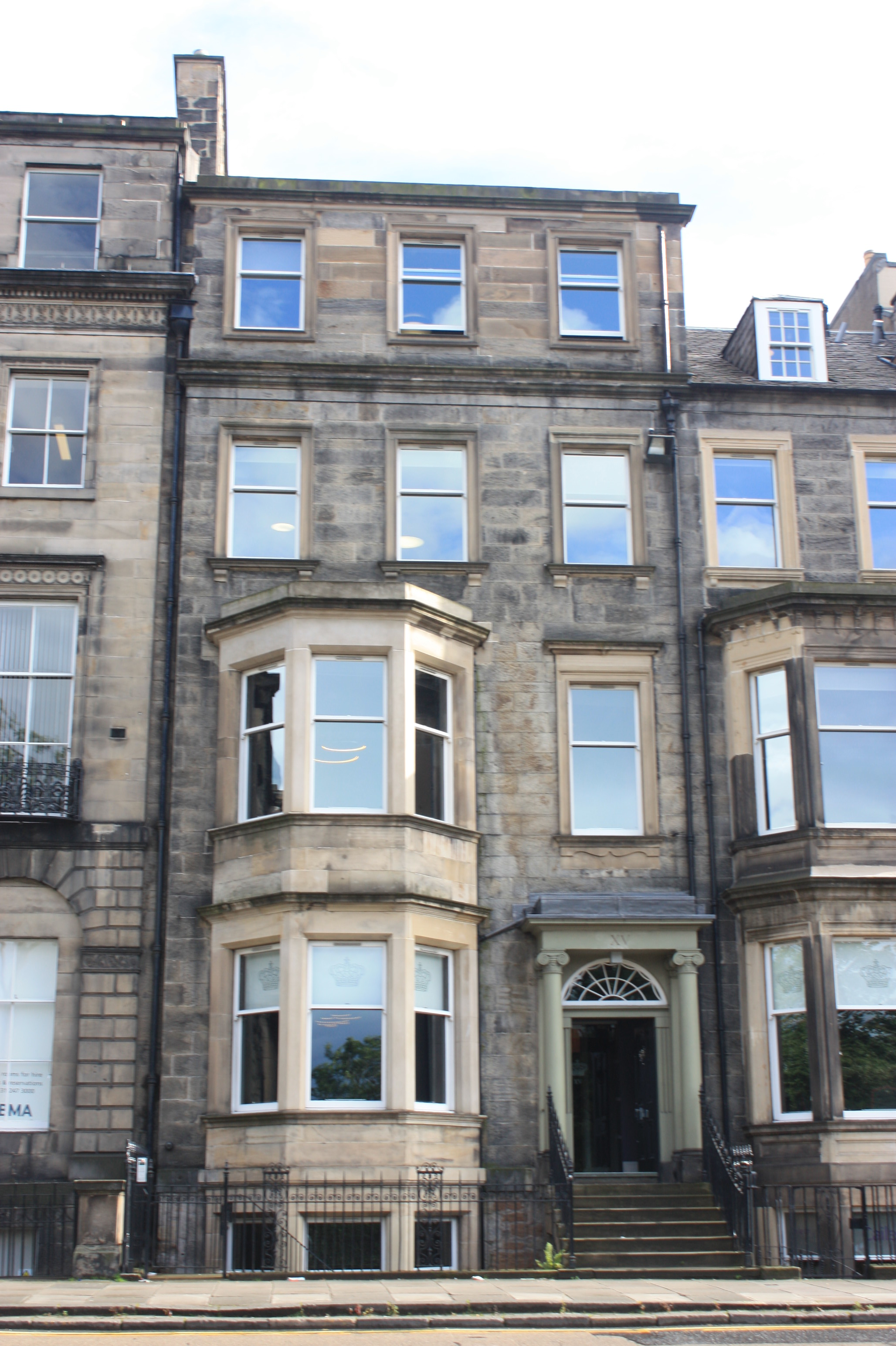
15 Queen Street, Edinburgh

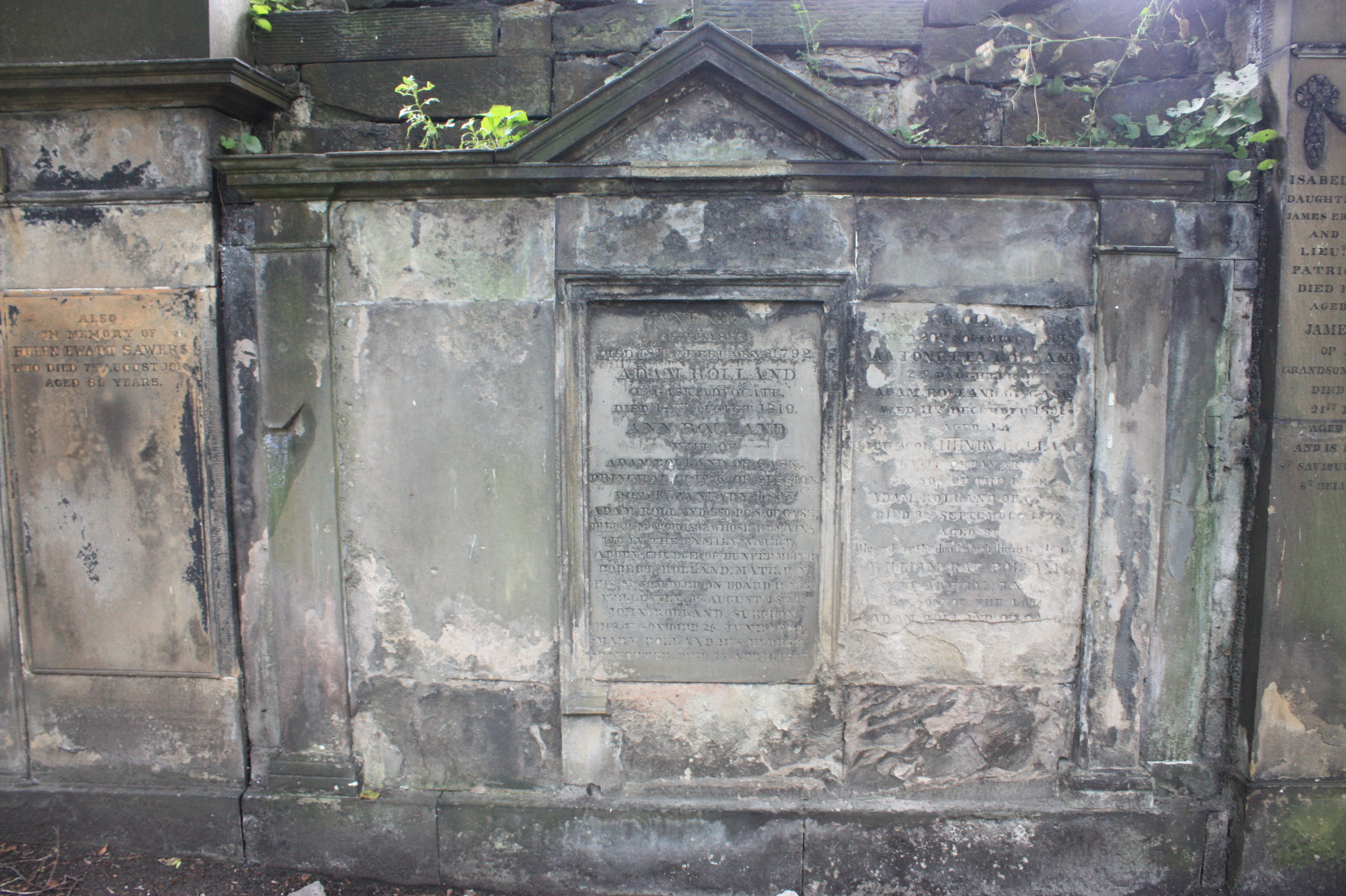
The grave of Adam Rolland, St Cuthbert's Churchyard, Edinburgh

He was born in 1734 the son of his namesake, Adam Rolland of Gask. His early education was in Dunfermline. He then studied law at the University of Edinburgh alongside Ilay Campbell and Andrew Crosbie, and qualified as an advocate in 1758. He became an expert on feudal law and later sat as a Judge on the Court of Session. He retired as a judge around 1800, and had an attack of apoplexy. He also became severely deaf.

He served as Depute Governor of the Bank of Scotland 1816 until death, replacing Patrick Miller of Dalswinton in this role.

He died at his home, 15 Queen Street in Edinburgh on 18 August 1819. He is buried with his family in St Cuthbert's Churchyard in the city centre. The grave lies against a wall, north-west of the church.

== Legacies ==
Whilst his estates went to his children he left £13,000 to a number of charitable projects (the equivalent of several million in modern terms). These monies went largely to hospitals and asylums and promotion of Christian interests. The most important donation was £1000 to create a school for the poor in Dunfermline, and the oddest was £500 to the Society for the Suppression of Begging. The Free School in Dunfermline was responsible for the free education of Andrew Carnegie and debatedly Rolland's philanthropy may have inspired Carnegie's.

Monies left to his family were used to build Luscar House in Dunfermline.

His will is held by The National Archive at Kew.

== Family ==
He was married to Ann Rolland (died 1837) and had several children including: Mary Rolland; Adam Rolland (1763–1837); Robert Rolland RN (died on board HMS Wellesley in 1829); John Rolland (a surgeon).

Their grandson was James Rolland (who came to fame in New Zealand), and their granddaughter Susan Rolland married Rev Robert Rainy.

== Artistic recognition ==
Rolland was painted by Sir Henry Raeburn c.1800. It is now held in the Art Institute of Chicago.
