= Vasaorden (barge) =

1923 replica of a 1770s Swedish royal barge

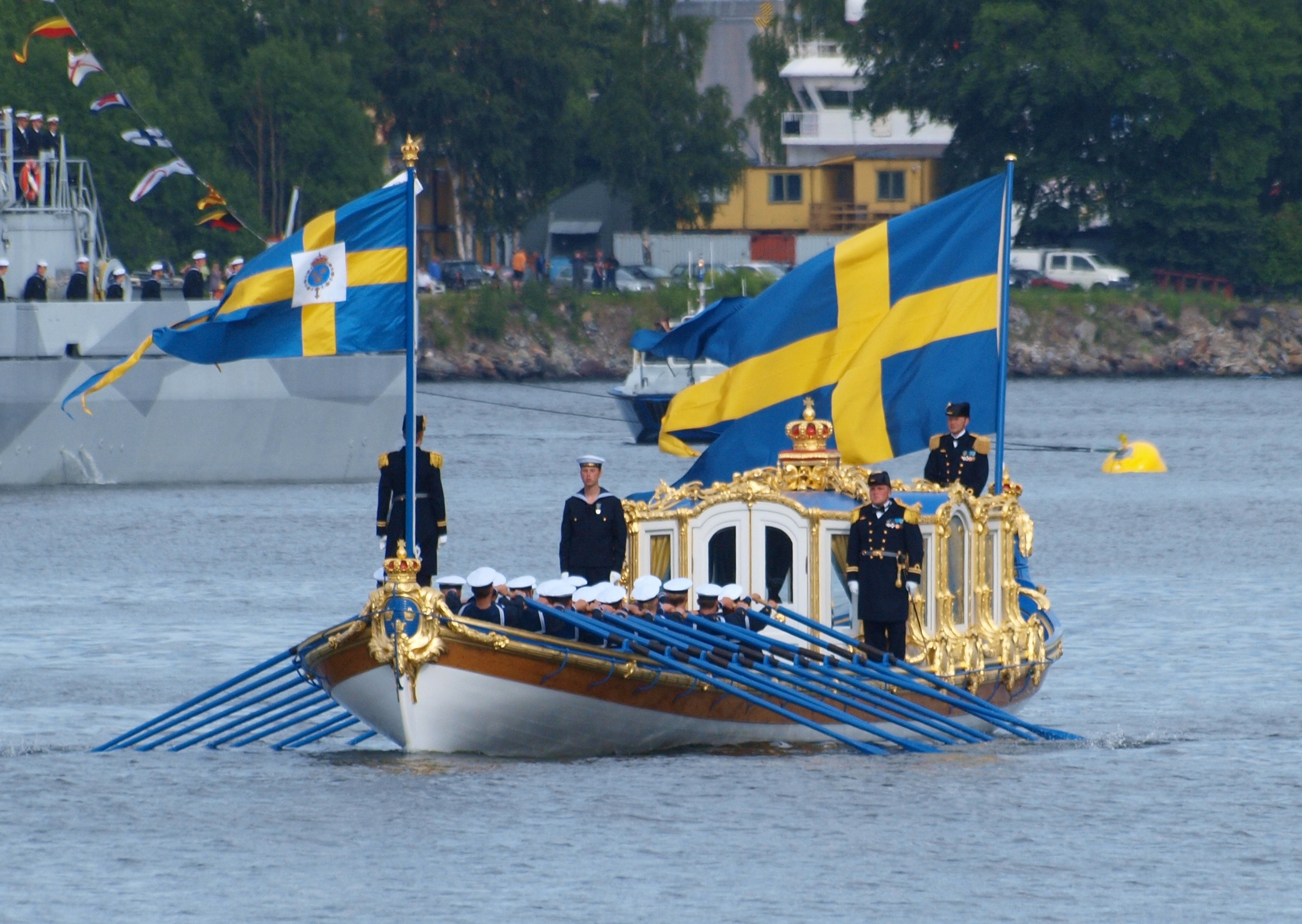
The royal barge Vasaorden during the wedding of Victoria, Crown Princess of Sweden, and Daniel Westling

Vasaorden is a Swedish royal barge originally constructed in 1774 based on a design by Fredrik Henrik af Chapman. It is used for ceremonies such as state visits and royal weddings.

It is 17.88 meters (58.7 ft) long and 3.1 meters (10 ft) wide.

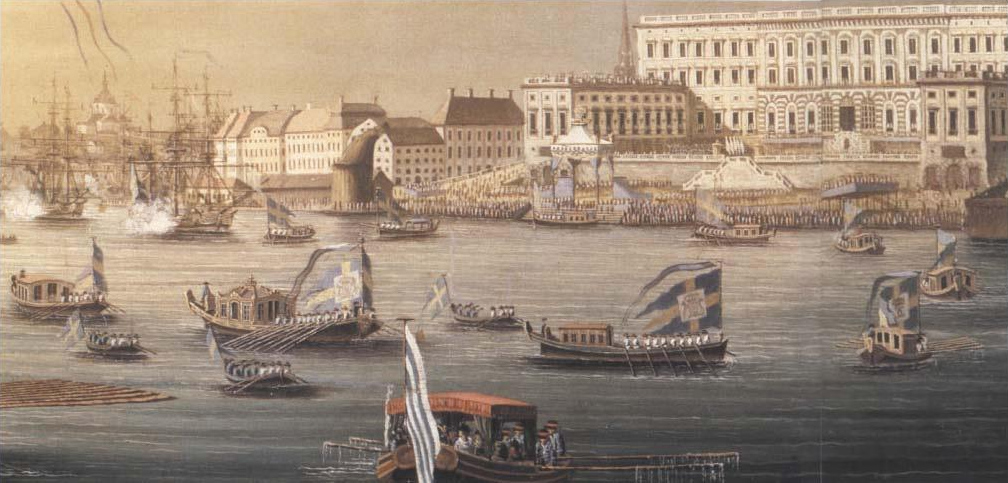
Vasaorden was first used to mark the arrival of Duchess Hedvig Elisabeth Charlotte to Stockholm in July 1774

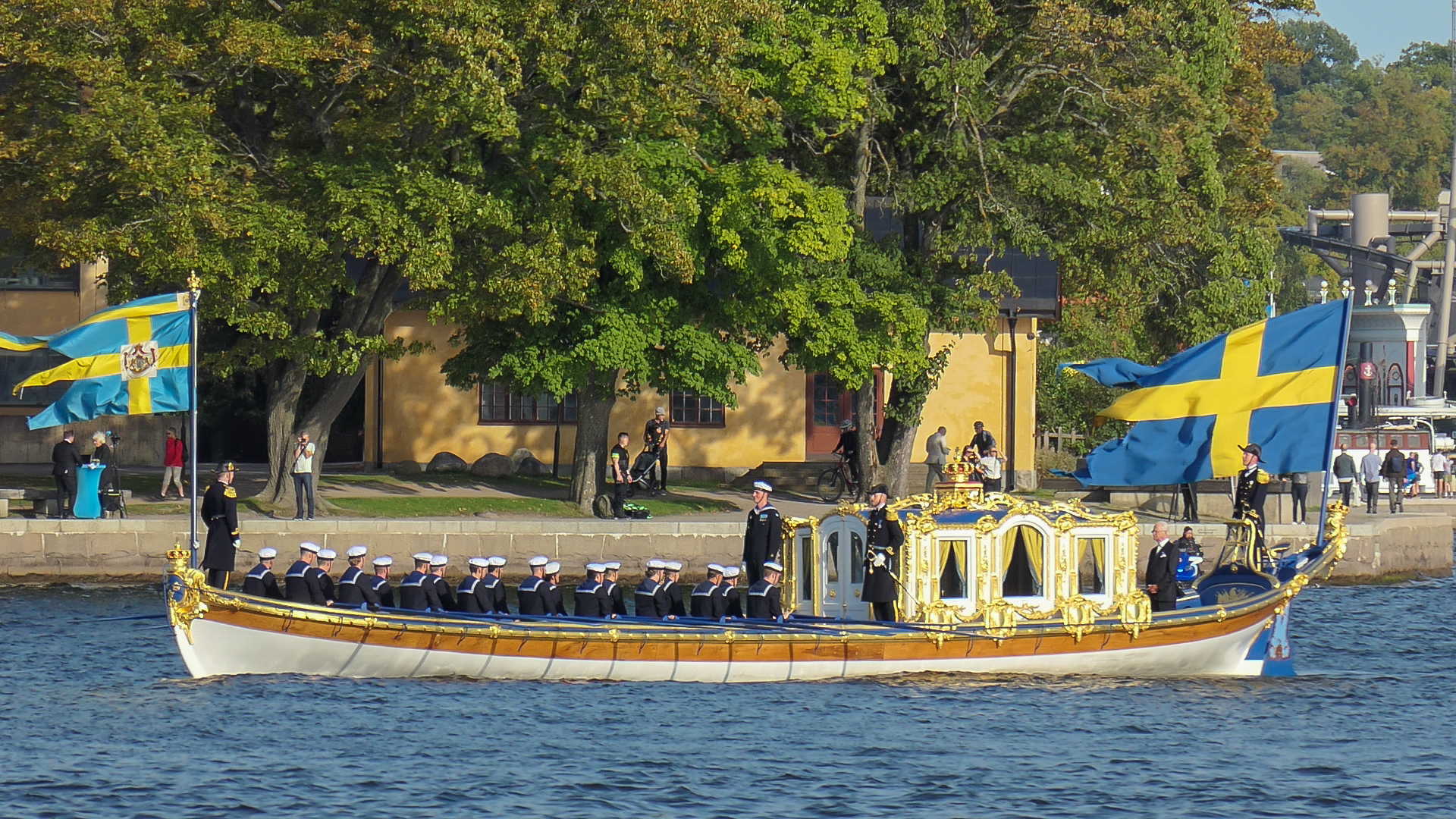
Vasaorden at the Golden Jubilee of Carl XVI Gustaf

After the original barge was destroyed in a fire on 8 August 1921, an exact replica was constructed and launched in 1923.

== See also ==
- Order of Vasa
