= Patrick Miller of Dalswinton =

Scottish banker

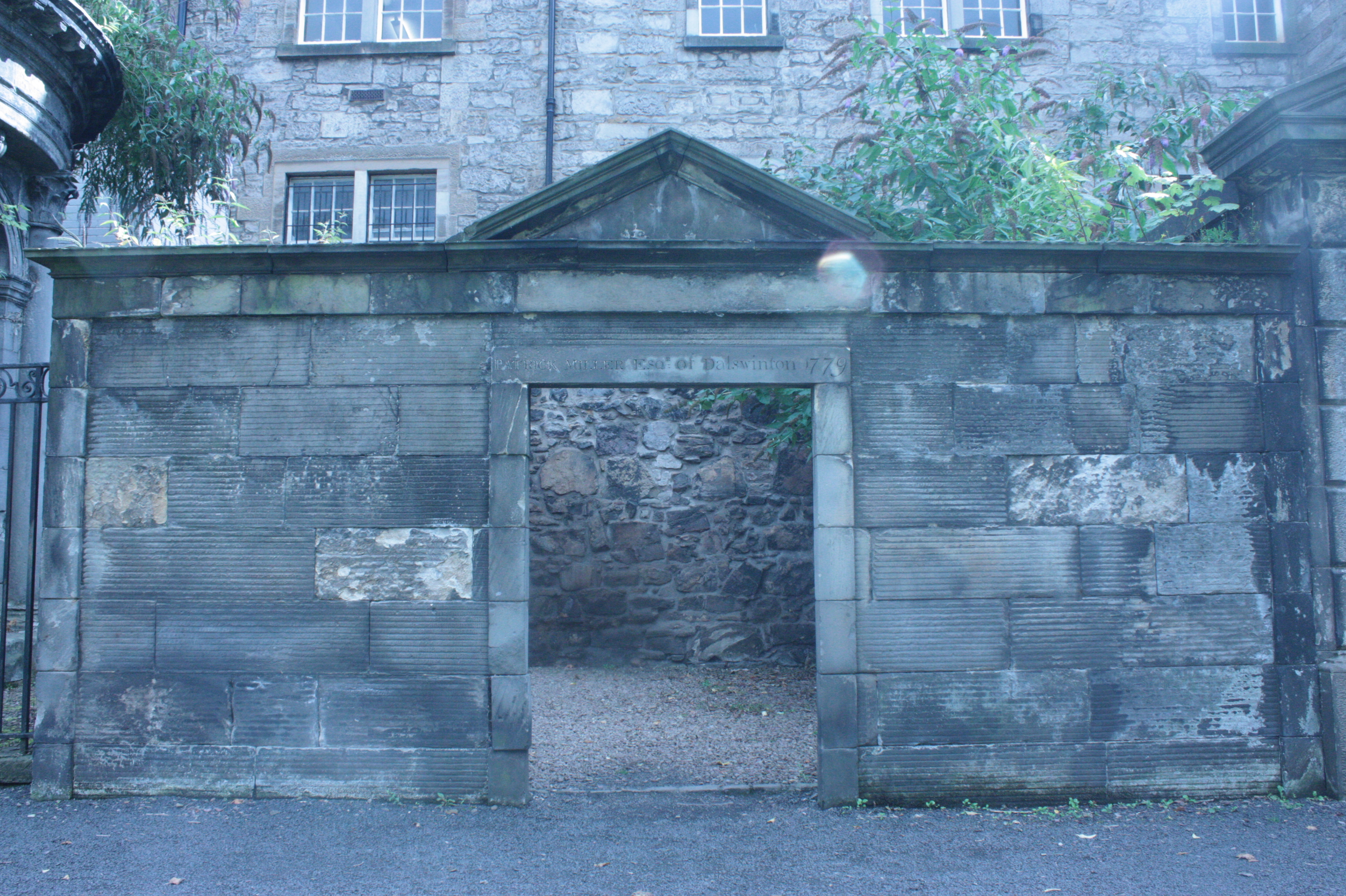
The tomb of Patrick Miller of Dalswinton, Greyfriars Kirkyard

Patrick Miller of Dalswinton (1731–1815) was a Scottish banker and inventor who served as Deputy Governor of the Bank of Scotland. He engineered the ship Experiment of Leith for the Swedish Navy, and was involved in a boat project with William Symington which later led to the paddle steamer Charlotte Dundas.

== Early life ==
Miller was born in Glasgow, the third son of William Miller of Glenlee, and his wife, Janet Hamilton. After attending the University of Glasgow, he decided to take up banking as his trade, since the Scottish economy was growing.

== Career ==
By November 1760, Miller became partners with William Ramsay of Barnton, merchants and bankers, in Edinburgh. In 1767, he was elected to the court of the Bank of Scotland where he implemented a number of reforms, particularly the introduction of note exchange, whereby the bank agreed to accept notes of its competitors. Thanks to his improvements, the bank successfully endured a banking crisis in 1772. Miller was a shareholder in the Carron Company.

In his final years, he served as Deputy Governor of the Bank of Scotland; he was succeeded by Adam Rolland of Gask FRSE upon his death.

== Invention and naval pursuits ==
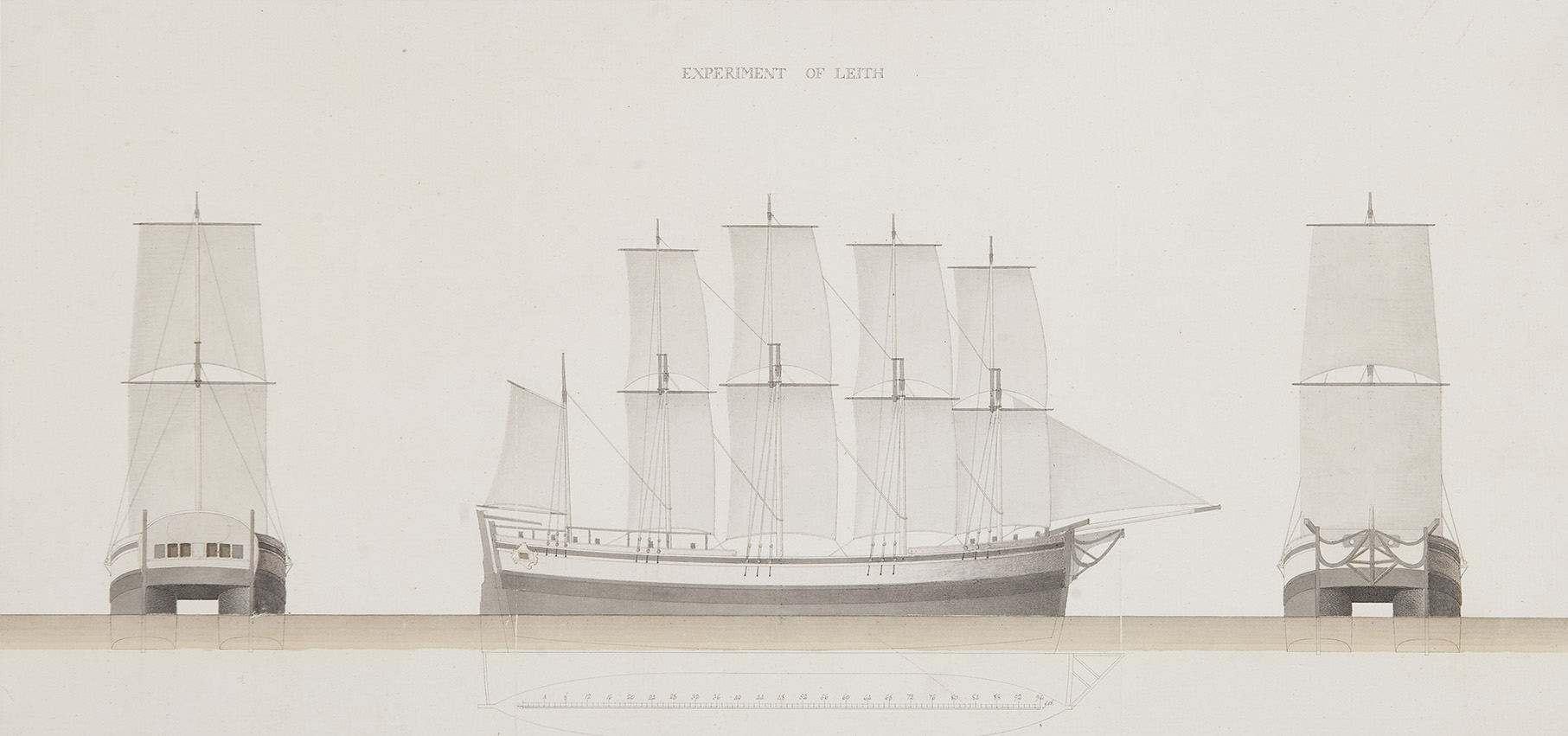
The vessel Experiment of Leith

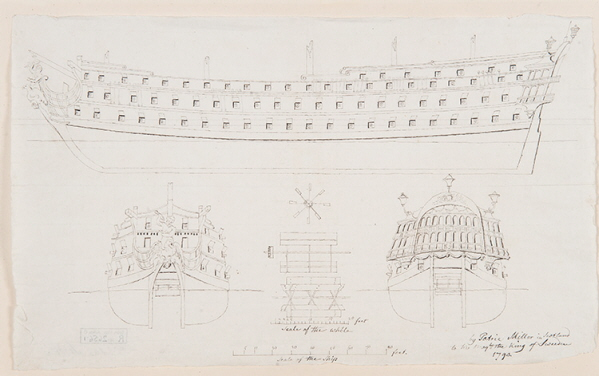
Experiment of Leith was a prototype for a larger ship that was never built, Sjöspöket or The Sea-Spook.

While looking after shipping interests overseas, Miller experienced firsthand the dangers of piracy on his ocean voyages. These brushes with privateers combined with his time on the ocean sparked a lifelong interest in ordnance and naval architecture.

=== Warship ===
He attempted to interest various European navies in his design for a super warship, but only Sweden showed any notable interest; their great naval architect Chapman called it the "English (sic) sea-spook". The Swedish king Gustav III, as thanks for the actual vessel, Experiment of Leith, that Miller sent him, despatched Miller seeds of the swede in a magnificent snuff-box, featuring marine illustrations, now in the collection of the Victoria & Albert Museum, London.

=== Pleasure boats ===
Miller was particularly interested in multiple-hulled pleasure boats propelled by cranked paddle wheels placed between the hulls. On seeing a steam-carriage model made by the engineer William Symington (or on the suggestion of Symington's friend James Taylor), he got Symington to build his patented steam engine with its drive into a twin-hulled pleasure boat. This was successfully tried out on Dalswinton Loch near Miller's house on 14 October 1788. The next year a larger engine was fitted to a 60-foot (18 m) long twin-hull paddle boat and tried on the Forth and Clyde Canal. After initial problems of paddle wheels breaking up on 2 December, the vessel travelled some distance along the canal on 26 December and 27 December 1789. Miller abandoned the project due to the rising expenses of the venture.

=== Charlotte Dundas ===
Ten years later, Lord Dundas restarted Symington's work on a steamboat, leading to the famous paddle steamer, Charlotte Dundas.

== Death ==
Miller died in 1815, and is buried in a tomb against the southern wall of Greyfriars Kirkyard in Edinburgh.
