= Hämeenmaa-class minelayer =

Minelaying ship class of the Finnish Navy

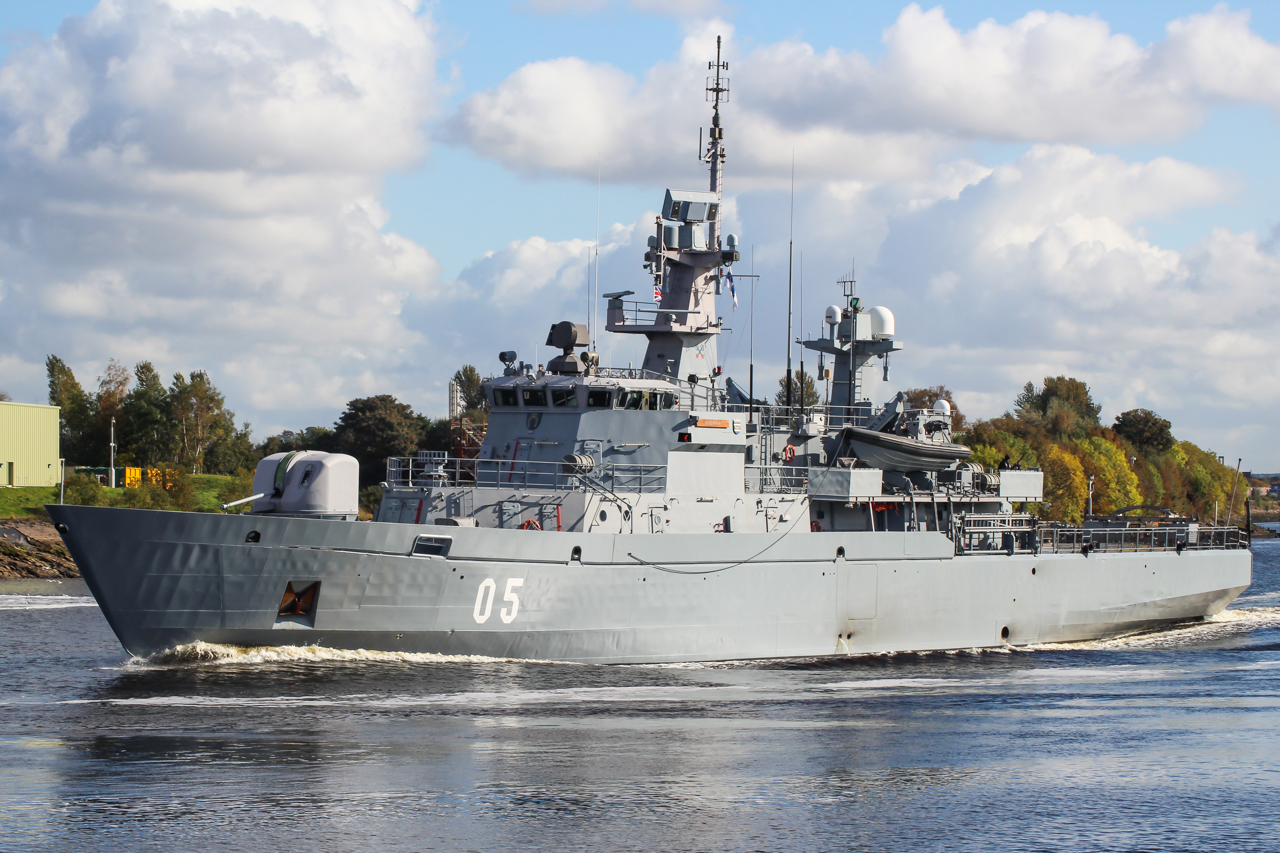
- Uusimaa in 2016

Class overview
- Name: Hämeenmaa
- Builders: Rauma shipyard
- Operators: Finnish Navy
- Preceded by: Finnish minelayer Keihässalmi; Finnish minelayer Pohjanmaa
- Succeeded by: Pohjanmaa-class corvette
- Completed: 2
- Active: 2

General characteristics
- Class & type: Hämeenmaa
- Type: MLC = Minelayer, Coastal
- Displacement: 1,450 tons
- Length: 77.8 m (255 ft)
- Beam: 11.6 m (38 ft)
- Draught: 3.2 m (10 ft)
- Installed power: 2 × Wärtsilä Vasa 16V22 (2,600 kW each)
- Propulsion: Two shafts; KaMeWa controllable pitch propellers
- Speed: About 20 knots (37 km/h; 23 mph)
- Complement: 60
- Sensors & processing systems: ANCS-2000 CMS, Link-16, Link-22; Furuno S/X (nav radars); Saab 9LV325E FCS (Fire Control System); Simrad hull-mounted sonar; EADS TRS-3D/16 ES (Surveillance Radar); Sagem EOMS (Electro Optical Multisensor System)
- Electronic warfare & decoys: Decoy: 2 × MASS (Multi Ammunition Softkill Systems); ESM: Thales DR3000 SIEWS (Shipborne Integrated Electronic Warfare System); COMS-ESM; LWR
- Armament: 1 × Bofors 57 mm/70 Mk1; 8-cell Denel Umkhonto-IR VLS SAM system; 2 × 12.7 mm machine gun; 2 × H&K GMG grenade machinegun; 2 × RBU-1200 depth charge rocket launcher; 2 × rails for depth charges; 4 × rails for 100-150 mines
- Armor: Vital areas Kevlar- and ArmourSteel protection
- Notes: Ships in class include: FNS Hämeenmaa (02); FNS Uusimaa (05)

The Hämeenmaa-class minelayers (Finnish: Hämeenmaa-luokan miinalaiva) is a two-vessel strong class of coastal minelayers, used by the Finnish Navy.

The Finnish Navy ordered the lead ship Hämeenmaa as a replacement for the venerable minelayer Keihässalmi, while the second ship brought the number of Finnish Navy minelayers to three, complementing the slightly larger Pohjanmaa. The ships were constructed at the Rauma shipyard by Finnyards.

The ships have a steel hull and aluminum alloy superstructure. The class has an ice operating classification of ICE-1A and can operate year-round in ice up to 40 cm thick.

During a crisis the main task for the Hämeenmaa-class ships is minelaying, but the vessels can also act as escort, transport and depot ships.

== History ==
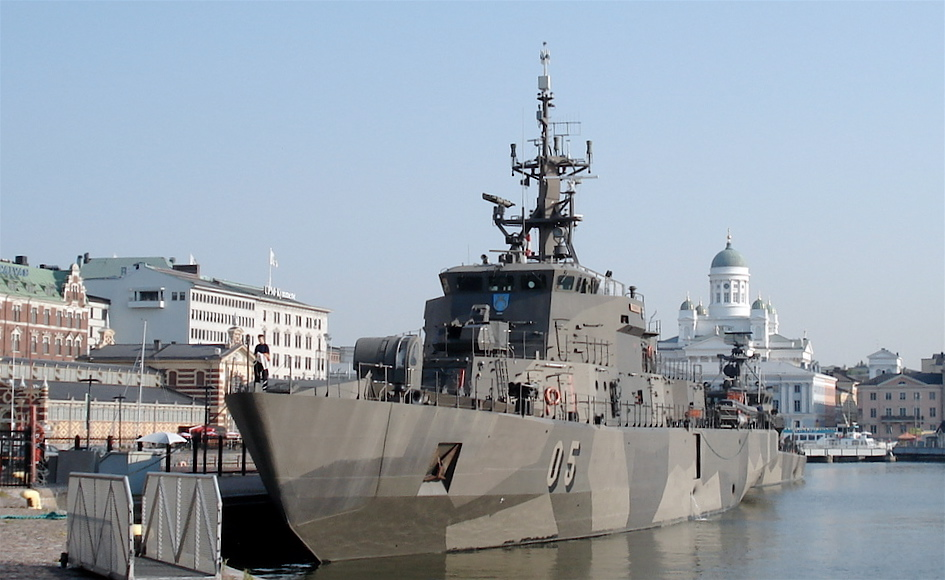
Uusimaa in 2006 before modernization

The contract for the Hämeenmaa class was originally awarded to Wärtsilä Marine but following its bankruptcy the contract was transferred to Hollming. Turmoil in the Finnish shipbuilding industry did not stop there. In early 1992 Hollming and Rauma Yards merged their shipbuilding industry to form a new company called Finnyards.

=== Modernization ===
Both ships were modernized 2006–08. The purpose of the modernization was to firstly upgrade the ships' equipment to fit modern standards, and secondly, to enable the ships to participate in international operations, mainly European Security and Defence Policy operations. They are fitted with weapons systems transferred from the discontinued Tuuli-class hovercraft including the Umkhonto missile system. Also, a new fire control system Saab 9LV325E FCS, modern monitoring equipment including TRS-3D/16 ES surveillance radar and Kongsberg ST2400 Variable Depth Sonar and SS2030 Hull mounted sonar, were installed.

In October 2013, Hämeenmaa changed its homeport from Pansio to Upinniemi to replace the decommissioned Pohjanmaa.

In January 2024, it was announced that Uusimaa's main engines would be replaced with new units.

== Role after modernization ==
The modernization of the two Hämeenmaa-class ships supports the Finnish Navy's operational capabilities and contributes to broader European maritime security objectives. The vessels can perform a range of roles, including minelaying, reconnaissance, escort duties, and anti-submarine warfare. Their capabilities are particularly relevant to maritime surveillance and security operations in the Baltic Sea, including monitoring the activities of the Russian Baltic Fleet.

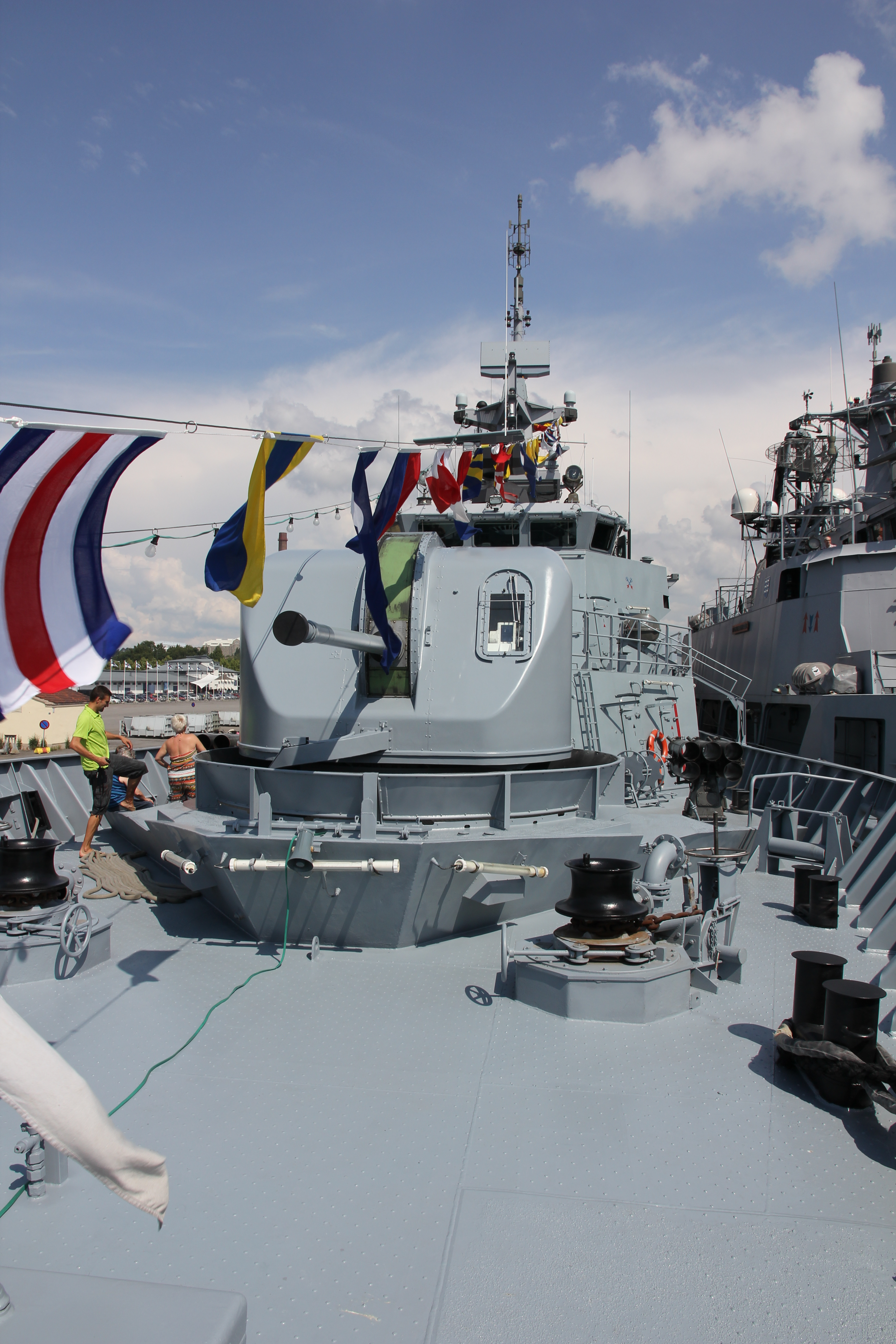
FNS Uusimaa main gun Bofors 57mm MK1

Weaponry
Original	After modernization
2 × Bofors 40 mm dual-purpose guns	1 × Bofors 57 mm dual-purpose gun
2 × twin 23 mm anti-aircraft guns	2 x 12.7mm machine guns
1 × six-missile ItO 91 surface-to-air missile launcher	1 × eight-cell ItO 04 surface-to-air missile launcher
2 × anti-submarine rocket launchers	2 × anti-submarine rocket launchers
2 × depth charge rails	2 × depth charge rails
100-150 sea mines (four mine laying rails)	100-150 sea mines (four mine laying rails)

Hämeenmaa was delivered from the dock back to the Navy on 13 April 2007 and Uusimaa, which had been under modernization since November 2006 at the Aker Yards dock in Rauma, was delivered on 26 October 2007. Hämeenmaa and Uusimaa conducted sea trials on their new systems until the end of 2008, when operational readiness was achieved. In October 2013 Hämeenmaa took over the role of flagship of the Finnish Navy with the retirement of Pohjanmaa in 2015.

== Vessels ==
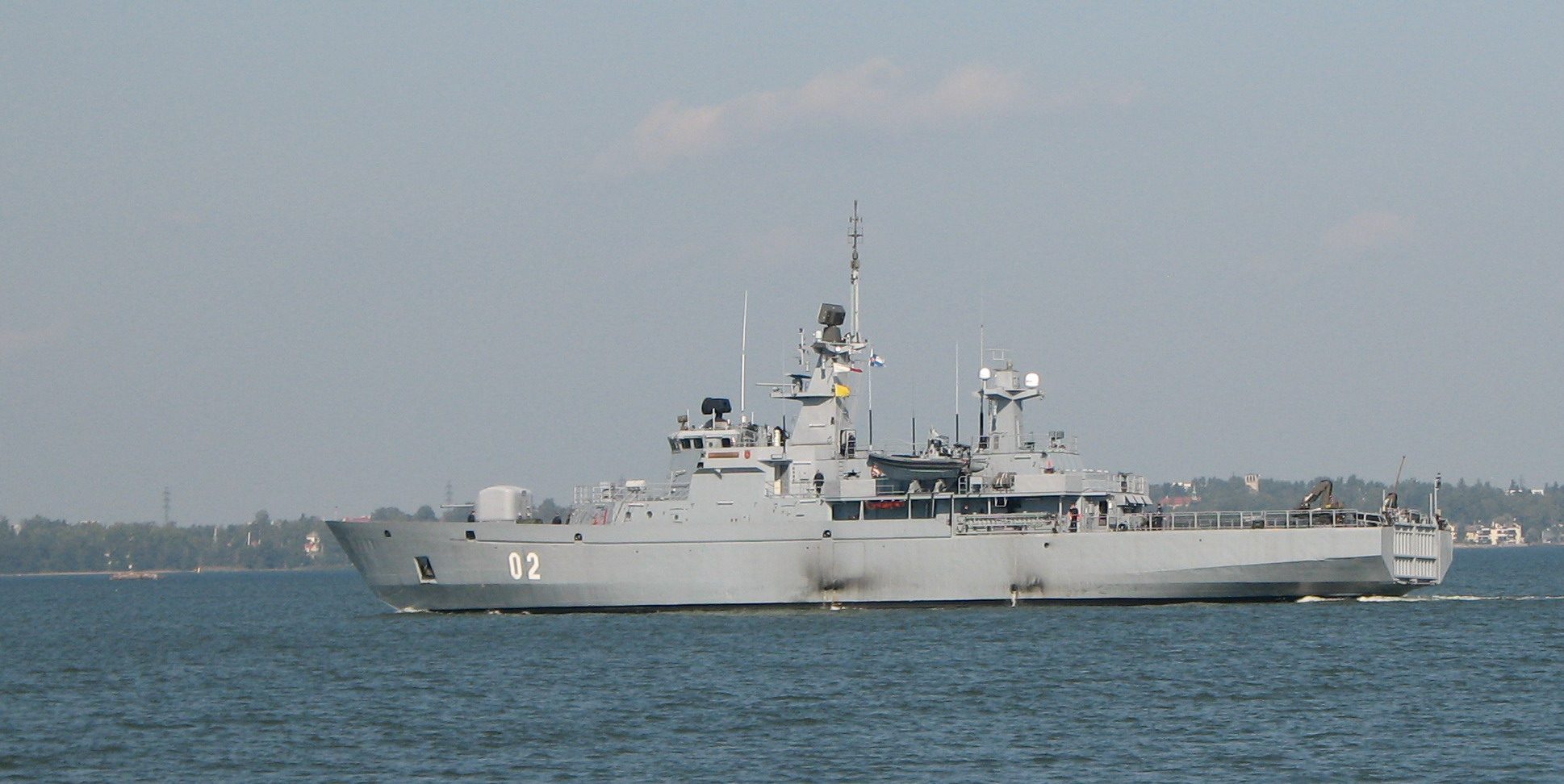
Hämeenmaa in 2009

FNS Hämeenmaa
Pennant number: 02.
Builder: Finnyards Rauma shipyard.
Ordered: 29 December 1989.
Laid down: 2 April 1991.
Launched: 11 November 1991.
Commissioned: 15 April 1992.
Home base: Upinniemi.
Current status: In active service.
FNS Uusimaa
Pennant number: 05.
Builder: Finnyards Rauma shipyard.
Ordered: 13 February 1991.
Laid down: 12 November 1991.
Launched: June 1992.
Commissioned: 2 December 1992.
Home base: Pansio.
Current status: In active service.
