= Ostrobothnia =

Ostrobothnia refers to various areas in Finland:

- Ostrobothnia (historical province), a traditional region (landskap) of Finland
- Ostrobothnia County, a county (län) of the Kingdom of Sweden in 1634–1775
- Modern regions (landskap) in Finland:
  - Ostrobothnia (administrative region), coastal part of historical Ostrobothnia
  - South Ostrobothnia
  - Central Ostrobothnia
  - North Ostrobothnia

== See also ==
- Bothnia (disambiguation)
- Pohjanmaa (disambiguation)
