= James Rolland =

Scottish-New Zealand politician (1802–1889)

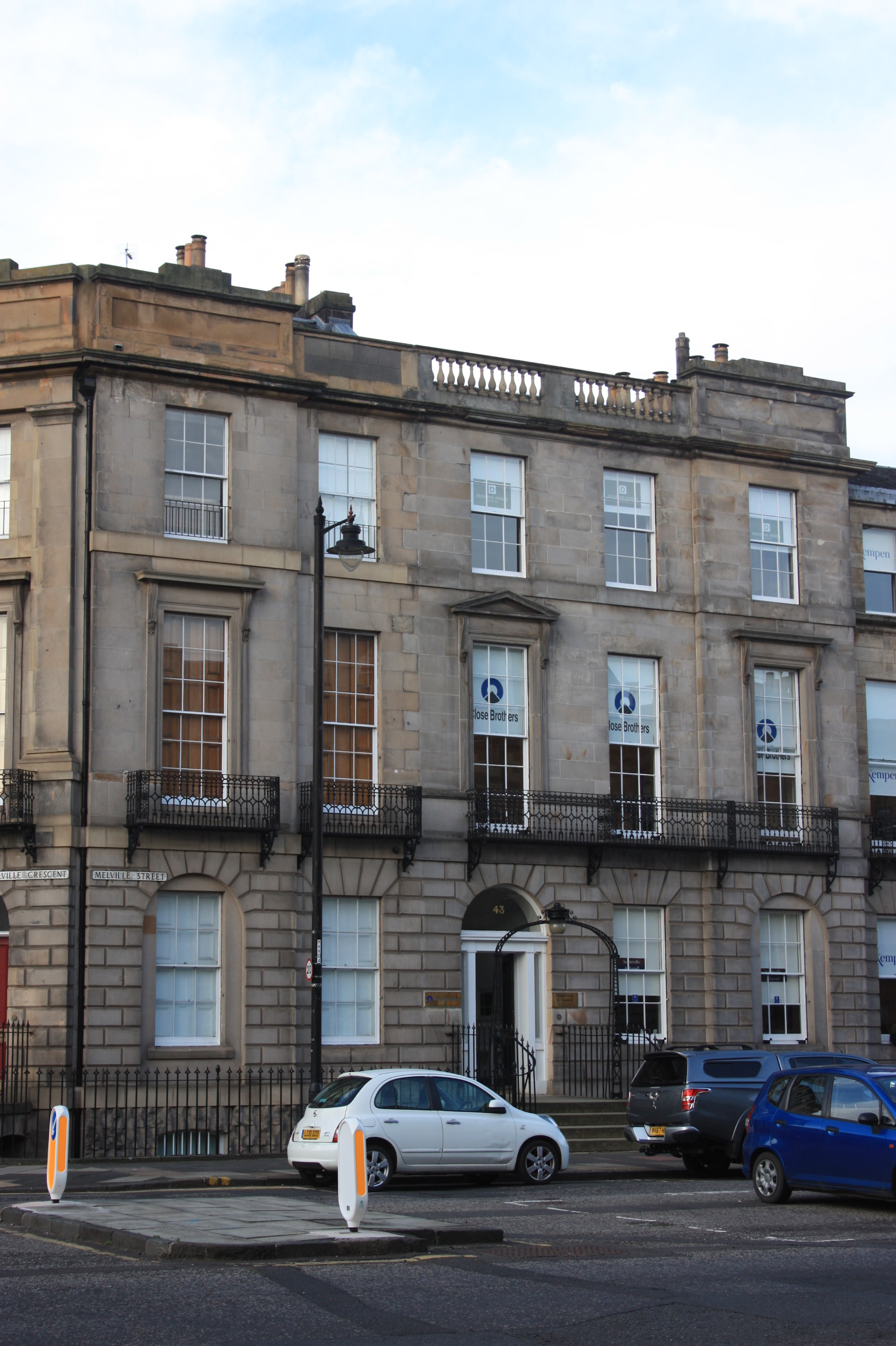
43 Melville Street, Edinburgh

James Rolland (24 November 1802 – 20 November 1889) was a Scot who became a member of the New Zealand Legislative Council from 8 July 1865 to 24 January 1866, when he resigned.

== Life ==
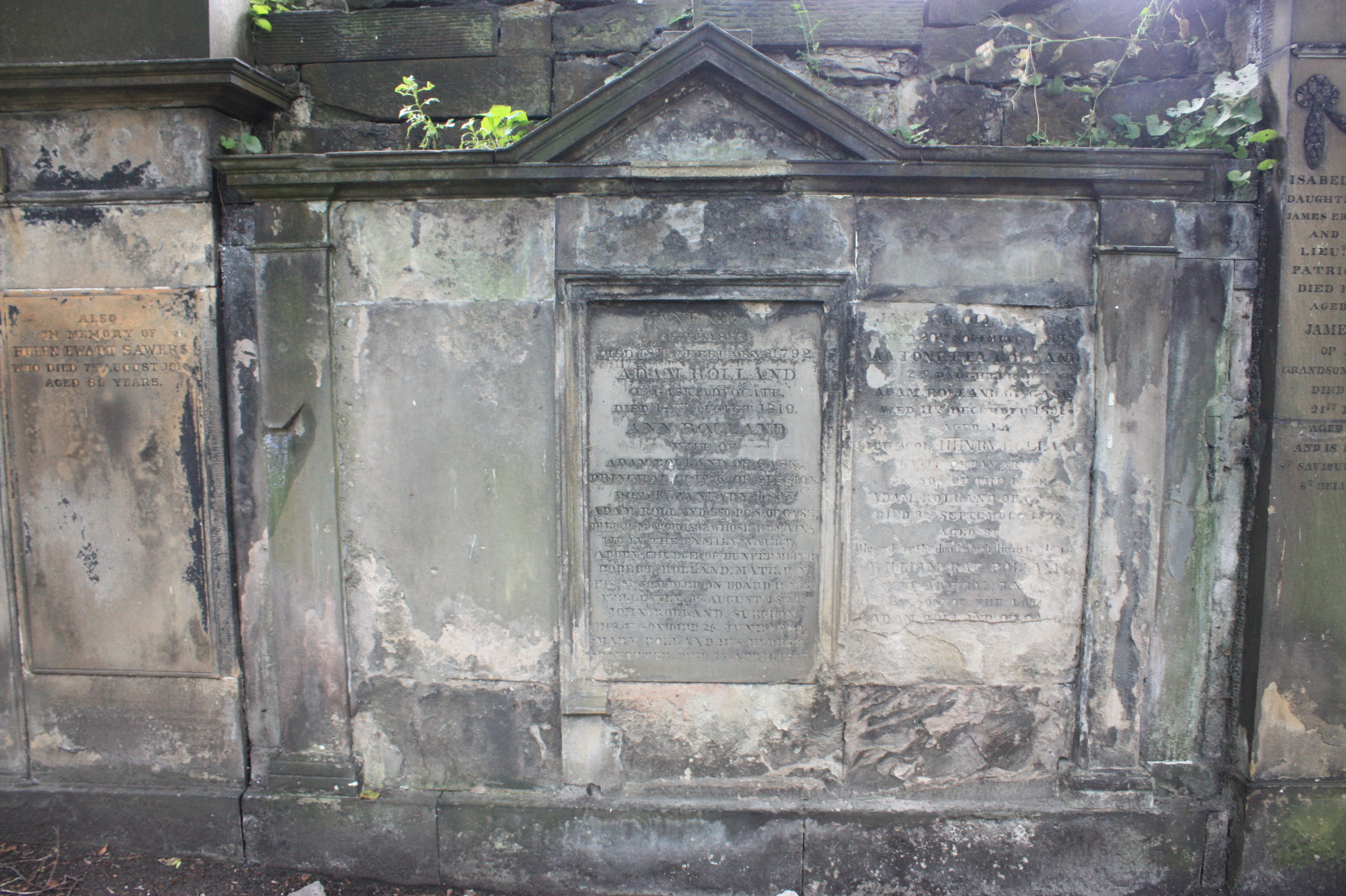
The grave of James Rolland, St Cuthbert's Churchyard, Edinburgh

He was born in Fife, Scotland in 1802. In Edinburgh he was a practicing Writer to the Signet.

In 1859 he emigrated to Otago in New Zealand on the ship Alpine with his wife and family. He lived at Gask Lodge on the Clutha River near Kaitangata, and also bought Blackstone Hill station in Central Otago, later selling it to his sons. His wife died in 1861 and is buried in Kaitangata cemetery.

In 1866 he returned to Edinburgh, where he lived, at 43 Melville Street, until his death. He is buried with his parents and grandparents in St Cuthbert's Churchyard in the city centre. The grave lies on a wall to the north-west of the church.

== Family ==
In 1840 he married Maria Rebecca Stothert.

His niece, Susan Rolland, married Rev Robert Rainy.

He had a fairly large family and his grandchildren included Sir Frank Rolland.
