= Pojama =

Type of warship of the Swedish archipelago fleet

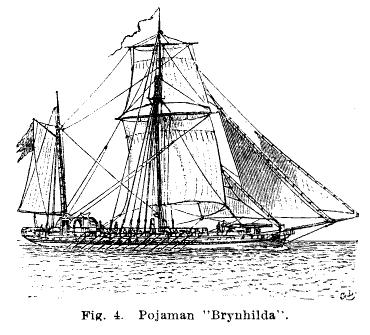
Line drawing of the Brynhilda, one of the three pojamas built for the Swedish navy

A pojama or pojema (also pojanmaa) was a type of warship built for the Swedish archipelago fleet in the late 18th and early 19th centuries. It was developed for warfare in the Archipelago Sea and along the coasts of Svealand and Finland against the Russian navy. The pojama was designed by the prolific naval architect Fredrik Henrik af Chapman for use in an area of mostly shallow waters and groups of islands and islets that extend from Stockholm all the way to the Gulf of Finland.

The pojama was intended to complement and partially to replace the existing galleys of the Swedish inshore squadrons, but were designed as hybrid sailing vessels that could also be rowed.

== Background ==
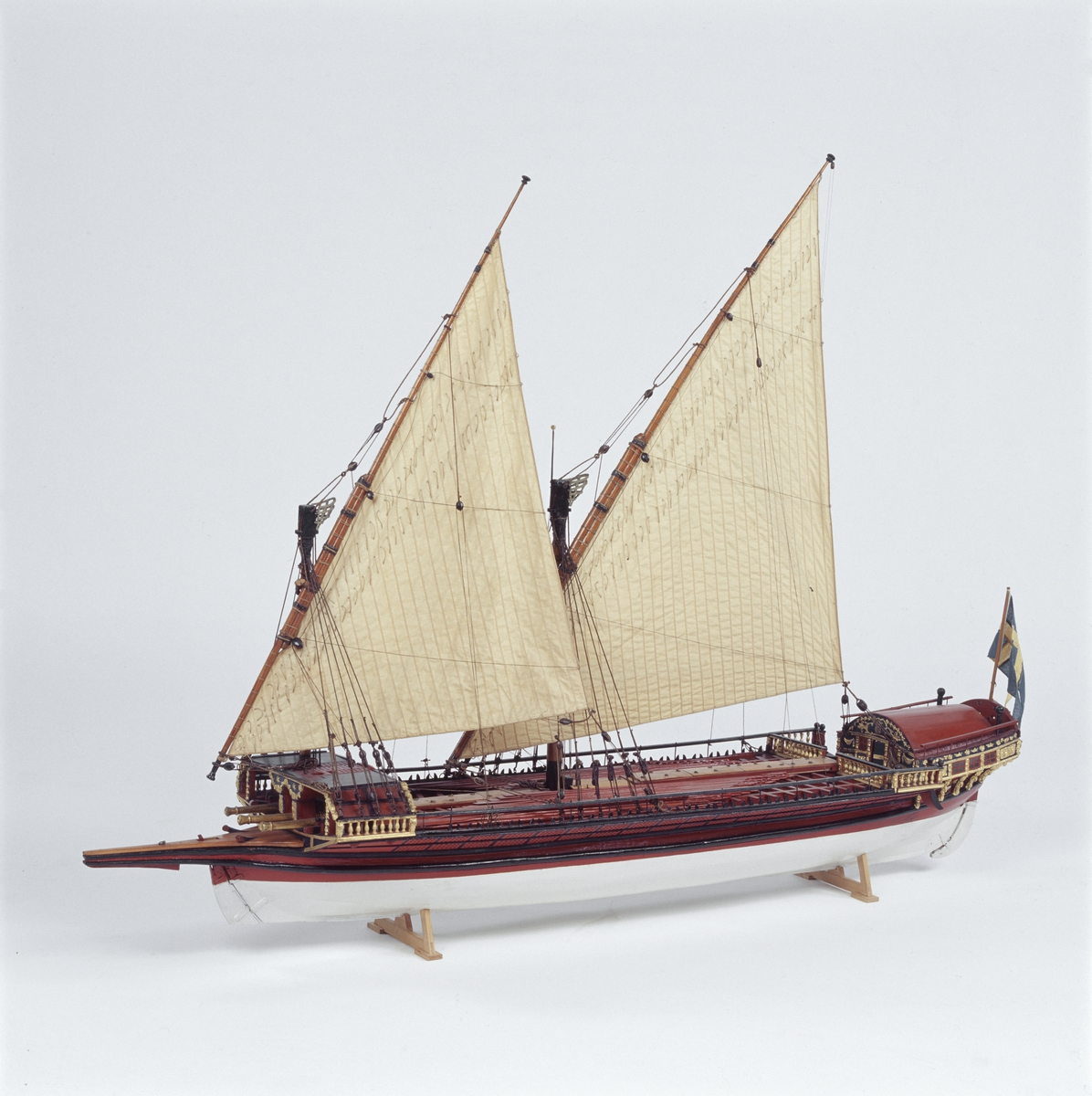
Contemporary model of an early 18th-century Swedish galley from the collections of the Maritime Museum in Stockholm. Small galleys like this one were a mainstay of the first Swedish coastal fleets.

In the early 18th century, the establishment of Russian naval power in the Baltic Sea challenged the interests of Sweden, at the time one of the major powers in the Baltic. The Swedish Empire at the time included territory in Northern Germany, all of modern Finland and most of the Baltic states, a dominion held together by the Baltic sea routes. Russian Tsar Peter the Great had established a new capital and naval base in Saint Petersburg in 1703. During the Great Northern War Sweden lost its Baltic state territories, and experienced destructive Russian raiding in Finland and along the chain of islands and archipelagos that stretched all the way from the Gulf of Finland to the capital of Stockholm. The traumatic experience led to the establishment of inshore flotillas of shallow-draft vessels. The first of these consisted mainly of smaller versions of the traditional Mediterranean warship, the galleys. Most of these more akin to galiots and were complemented with gun pram. The disastrous war against Russia 1741–1743 and the minor involvement in Prussia in the Seven Years' War 1757–1762 showed the need for further expansion and development of the inshore flotillas with more specialized vessels.

Traditional galleys were effective as troop transports for amphibious operations, but were severely under-gunned, especially in relation to their large crews; a galley with a 250-man crew, most of whom were rowers, would typically be armed with only one 24-pounder cannon and two 6-pounders, all in the bow. However, they were undecked and lacked adequate shelter for the rower-soldiers, great numbers of which succumbed to illness in the war of 1741–1743. The Swedish military invested considerable resources into the establishment of the "archipelago fleet" (skärgårdsflottan), a separate branch of the armed forced that organizationally belonged to the army. In 1756, it was even officially designated Arméns flotta, "Navy of the Army", though it was in many ways a highly independent organization that attracted a social and cultural elite and enjoyed the protection of Gustav III after his 1772 coup that empowered him as an absolute monarch.

Several new ships were designed by the naval architect Fredrik Henrik af Chapman to bolster the hitting-power of the new Swedish arm, to provide it with better naval defense and greater fire support capabilities during amphibious operations. The result was four new vessels that combined the maneuverability of oar-powered galleys with the superior rigs and decent living conditions of sailing ships: the udema, pojama, turuma and hemmema, named after the Finnish regions of Uusimaa (Uudenmaan in genitive form), Pohjanmaa, Turunmaa and Hämeenmaa (Tavastia). All four have been referred to as skärgårdsfregatter, "archipelago frigates", in Swedish and English historical literature, though the smaller udema and pojama are also described as "archipelago corvettes" originally. The name "pojama" has been carried on (in its more modern variant) as a traditional vessel name in the Finnish navy, with the previous flagship and the future class of corvettes in development as of 2019 named after the type.

== Design ==
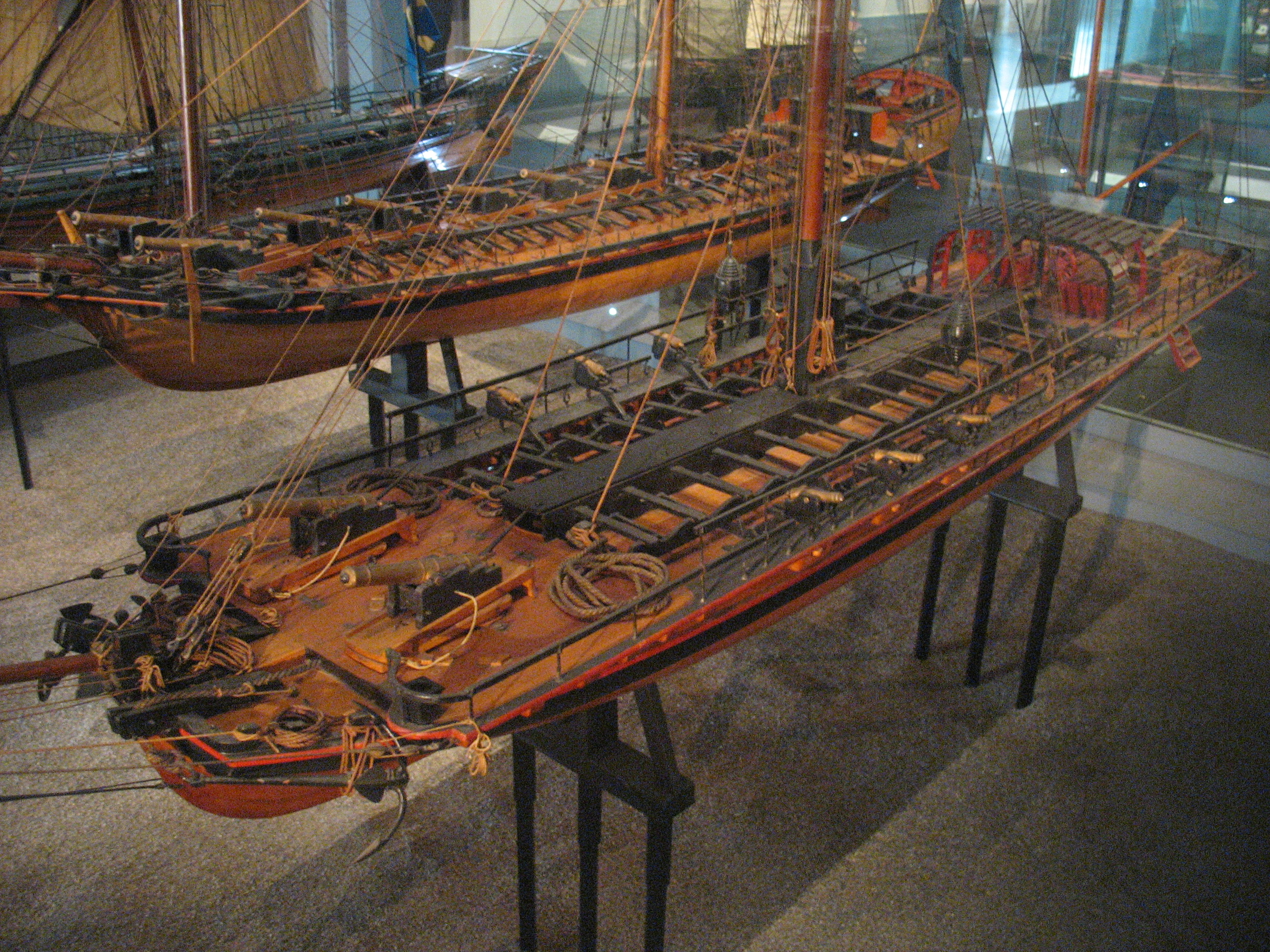
Contemporary model of Brynhilda (built in 1776) at the Maritime Museum in Stockholm. The model is flying the blue three-tongued flag of the archipelago fleet from the stern.

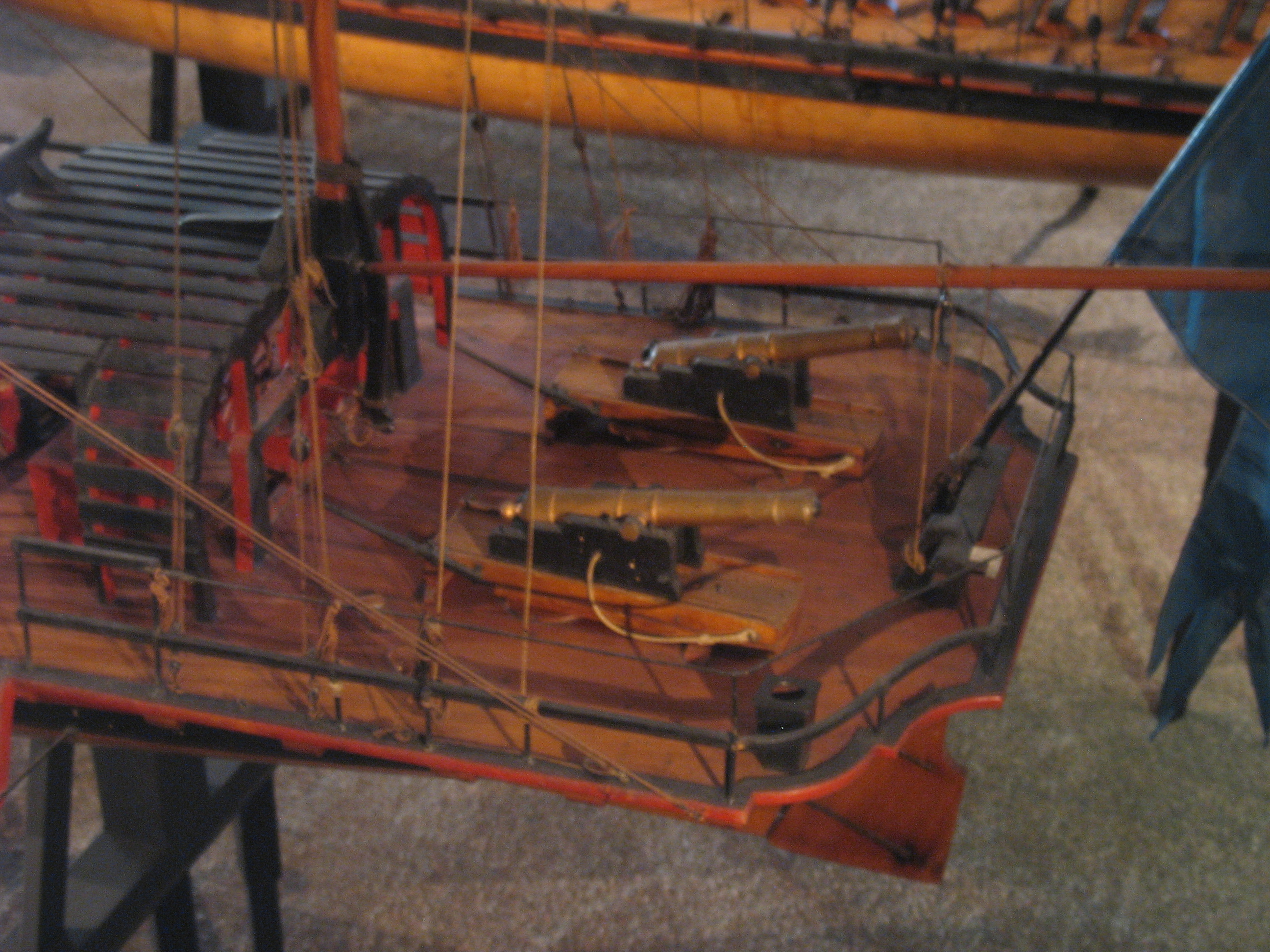
Closeup view of the stern of the Brynhilda model

The first pojama was built in 1764 (the same year as the larger version turumas and the earliest hemmema). It was a low-hulled vessel with two masts, a main and a mizzen, rigged like a bomb ketch with two square sails, a lug sail, and three staysails supported between the mainmast and the bowsprit. The first pojama was 23.8 m (78 ft) long, 5.5 m (18 ft) wide, with a draft of 1.8 m (6 ft). The three later pojamas built for the Swedish navy varied in size from 20 m (65.5 ft) up to 27.6 m (90.5 ft). Its main armament was two heavy guns in the bow and stern (ranging from 12-pounders up to 24-pounders). These could also be dragged towards the center of the vessel and aimed sideways, though with considerable effort. It also had up to 10 swivel guns along the railings for close-range defense. For maneuverability, it carried 14 pairs of oars which operated through oarports attached to a rectangular outrigger which improved the leverage for the oarsmen.

== Service ==
Only four pojamas were built for the Swedish navy and their use was often limited to reconnaissance and dispatch duties. The pojamas saw limited action in the archipelago navy's operations in the war of 1788–1790. A single pojama participated in the first battle of Svensksund in 1789, a minor Russian victory, but none in the second battle, Sweden's greatest naval victory ever.

Like the other specialized archipelago vessels, the pojama proved to have only limited advantages. While its firepower that was equal or superior even to larger galleys, they were slow even under oars. The second battle of Svensksund showed that the smaller gunboats and gunsloops were far more efficient for inshore operations and eventually replaced the "archipelago frigates" by the Finnish War of 1808–09, where Sweden eventually lost all of its Finnish possessions.

== Ships ==
Four pojamas were built, all of them for the Swedish archipelago fleet. They are listed in the table below with basic information where it is actually known.

- Gamla (1760)
- Disa (1764)
- Fröja (1764)
- Brynhilda (1776)

Name	Shipyard	Launched	Size	Pairs of oars	Armament	Fate
Gamla Pojama ("Old Pojama")	Stralsund	1760	length: 20.1 width: 4.2	14	1 × 6-pounders 10 swivel guns	Scrapped in 1775.
Disa	Sveaborg	1764	length: 23.7 width: 5.5 draft: 1.8	14	2 × 12-pounders 16 swivel guns	
Fröja	Sveaborg	1764	length: 23.7 width: 5.5 draft: 1.8	14	2 × 12-pounders 16 swivel guns	Burnt at the first battle of Svensksund in 1789.
Brynhilda	Stockholm (Djurgårdsvarvet)	1776	length: 27.6 width: 8 draft: 1.9	14	4 × 12-pounders 8 swivel guns	Sank at the battle of Svensksund 1790.

== See also ==
- Hemmema
- Turuma
- Udema
