= Finnish minelayer Pohjanmaa =

Finnish Navy Warship

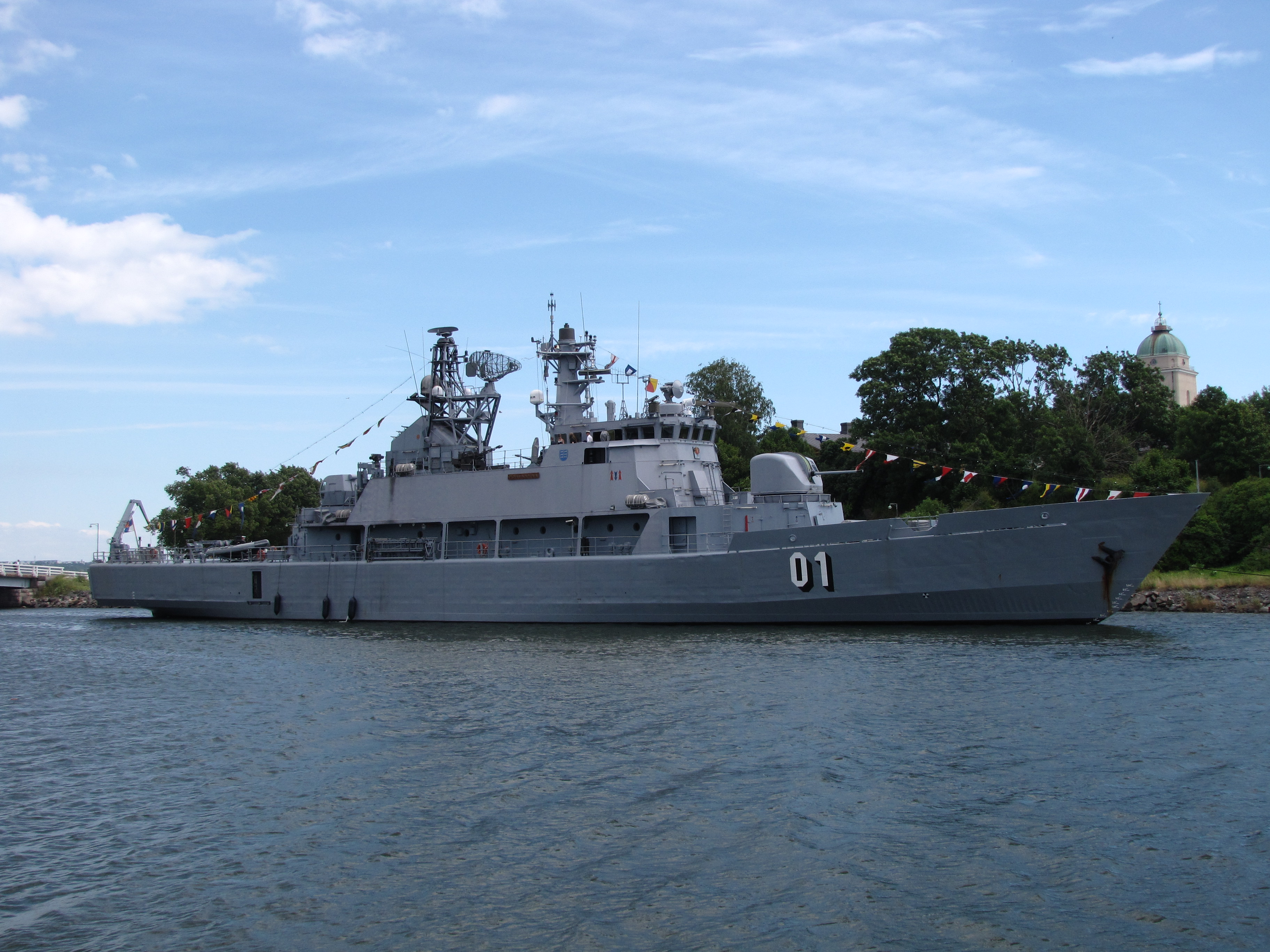

Finland
- Name: Pohjanmaa
- Operator: Finnish Navy
- Ordered: 1977
- Builder: Wärtsilä Helsinki Shipyard, Finland
- Yard number: 421
- Laid down: 4 May 1978
- Launched: 28 August 1978
- Commissioned: 8 June 1979
- Decommissioned: Late 2013
- In service: 1979–2013
- Home port: Upinniemi
- Fate: Decommissioned and sold to a government owned civilian company

Finland
- Name: Pohjanmeri
- Namesake: Finnish for North Sea
- Owner: Meritaito
- Port of registry: Helsinki
- Acquired: April 2016
- In service: 2016–2026
- Identification: IMO number: 4542642; MMSI number: 230664000; Call sign: OJRO
- Fate: Scrapped 2026

General characteristics (as minelayer)
- Type: Minelayer
- Displacement: 1,450 tonnes
- Length: 78.6 m (258 ft)
- Beam: 11.2 m (37 ft)
- Draught: 3.3 m (11 ft)
- Ice class: 1A
- Installed power: 2 × Wärtsilä Vasa 16V22; 4,280 kW (5,740 hp) (combined)
- Propulsion: Two shafts; controllable-pitch propellers
- Speed: 18–19 knots (33–35 km/h; 21–22 mph)
- Range: 3,500 nautical miles (6,500 km; 4,000 mi)
- Complement: 70 (120 when acting as a training ship)
- Sensors & processing systems: Signaal DA05 radar; Philips 9LV 220 FCS; Simrad hull-mounted sonar
- Electronic warfare & decoys: Decoy: Philax chaff and IR flares; ESM: Argo Systems radar warning system
- Armament: 1 × Bofors 120 mm/46 (pre 1996); 1 × Bofors 57 mm/70 Mk1 (post 1998); 1 × Bofors 40 mm/70; 2 × Sako twin-barrel 23 mm/87 (modified ZU-23-2); 2 × NSV 12.7 mm machine guns; 2 × rails for depth charges; 4 × rails for 150 mines (Sea Mine 2000)

Pohjanmaa was a minelayer of the Finnish Navy. The sole member of her class, she was the flagship of the Finnish Navy as well as the largest naval ship in service in Finland until 2013. The ship has a Finnish-Swedish ice class 1A so she could operate all year round. During a crisis, the main task for Pohjanmaa would have been mine laying and acting as a command ship. She also acted as a school ship for the Naval Academy cadets. Part of their training includes an annual cruise abroad.

The 34-year-old Pohjanmaa was scheduled for decommissioning in late 2013. In October 2013, minelayer Hämeenmaa took over the role of flagship of the Finnish Navy.

In 2016, Pohjanmaa was sold to the Finnish state-owned maritime survey company Meritaito and refitted as a survey vessel. She was renamed Pohjanmeri, Finnish for the North Sea. In July 2026, the ship was sold for scrap after having reached the end of its service life.

== Pohjanmaa (1979–2016) ==
=== History ===
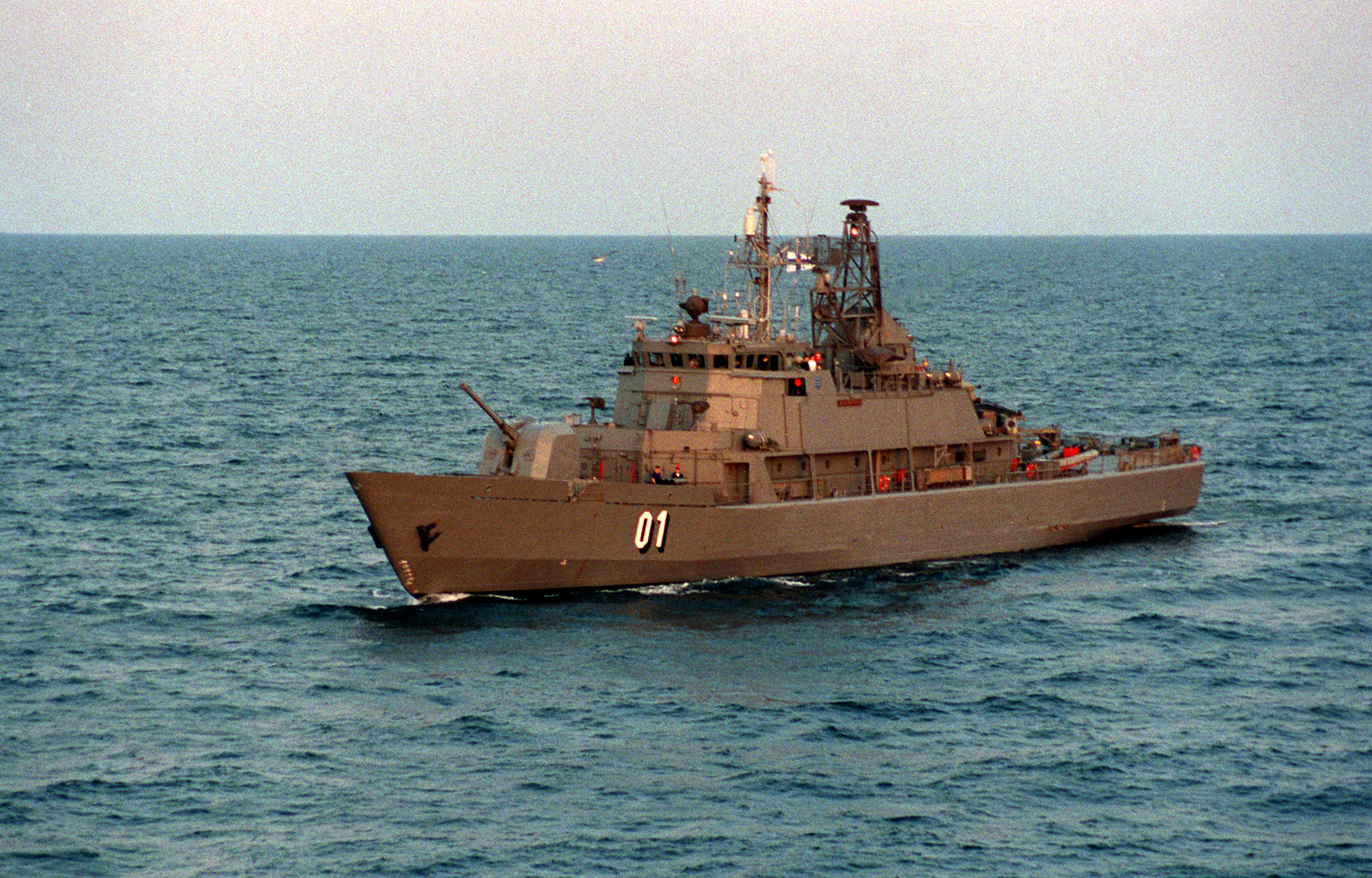
Pohjanmaa in 1993 with original armament before modernization

Pohjanmaa was built in 1979 at the Wärtsilä Helsinki Shipyard, Finland. Her initial main armament consisted of a Bofors 120 mm Automatic Gun L/46.

Pohjanmaa first served as a school ship for the Naval Academy until 1992 when she was transferred to the Gulf of Finland Fleet (now called Gulf of Finland Naval Command).

When she was completed, she replaced the minelayer Ruotsinsalmi and as a school ship, the Matti Kurki. On 10 May 1982, she was given the traditional shield of ocean faring vessels previously held by Suomen Joutsen, so in effect Pohjanmaa continued the tradition of the three ships.

The ship underwent a heavy modernization program in 1996–1998, which included a replacing her Bofors 120 mm L/46 main gun with a more modern dual-purpose Bofors 57 mm Naval Automatic Gun L/70.

The annual training cruise for the cadets took the ship as far as Belém, Brazil. The accommodation capacity of the vessel for the long range cruises could be increased with accommodation containers.

On 28 June 2005, as part of its cruise, Pohjanmaa participated in the International Fleet Review which was a part of the Trafalgar 200 celebrations.

In 2007, the ship was refitted together with the Hämeenmaa-class minelayers and her colour scheme changed from camouflage to light grey. Her second aft gun was also removed from the aft deck due to narrow shooting sectors, which were even further narrowed due to a new bigger hydraulic crane of a new seaboat.

In 2010, it was decided that the Pohjanmaa would participate in Operation Atalanta in 2011. On 6 April 2011, Pohjanmaa captured a vessel suspected as pirate mothership along with two speedboats. The search onboard revealed assault rifles, RPGs and other weapons. Eighteen of the suspected pirates were incarcerated onboard Pohjanmaa. Since the Prosecutor General of Finland decided not to prosecute, the pirates were transferred to the jurisdiction of Operation Atalanta, which later released the pirates. The pirate ship and the speedboats were scuttled at sea.

=== Naming ===
Pohjanmaa was christened on 8 June 1979 by Aili Haapkylä. The name comes from the Swedish-built pojamas of the 1770s — see "Pohjanmaa (disambiguation)" for other uses of the name.

The vessel was nicknamed Viinalaiva Puuhamaa by the Finnish Navy conscripts after the Finnish amusement park (vessel was also nicknamed Vanha rouva).

=== Decommissioning ===
Despite modernizations, the over 30-year-old Pohjanmaa reached the end of her operational lifespan in the mid-2010s and the minelayer was decommissioned in late 2013. She was replaced (after a gap of many years in between) by Pohjanmaa-class corvettes, the next generation's surface combatant, which are bigger than the missile boats in service at the time and more capable for international co-operation. In addition to Pohjanmaa, the new class of multi-purpose naval vessels—dubbed MTA2020 (Monitoimialus 2020) in the preliminary papers—is intended to replace also Hämeenmaa-class minelayers and Rauma-class missile boats as they are retired.

When Pohjanmaa was decommissioned, it was stated that the vessel would be either sold or scrapped if a sufficient buyer would not be found. In September 2013, it was reported that the Estonian Navy was interested in purchasing the vessel. However, it was later reported that Estonia decided not to purchase the vessel. Some interest was also expressed by the Croatian Navy whose representatives even came to Finland to inspect the vessel. The Finnish towing and salvage company Alfons Håkans also offered to buy the vessel, but was declined. The Finnish Ministry of Defence also tried to find a museum for the ship to be conserved, but it did not happen.

On 18 December 2015, it was announced that Pohjanmaa would be sold for scrap. The vessel would be broken up in Finland and the operation, which was expected to begin in March 2016, would cost about 248,100 euro. The engines and some equipment would be sold to cover part of the expenses. However, in March 2016 it was reported that the scrapping has been cancelled and the vessel would be sold to Meritaito, the Finnish state-owned shipping company that owns and operates fairway support vessels. The vessel was stripped of her armament and converted to a survey vessel at Western Shipyard in Salo, Finland, according to plans drawn by the Finnish design company ILS Oy.

== Pohjanmeri (2016–2026) ==
From 2016 to 2026 the ship, renamed Pohjanmeri (Finnish for the North Sea), served as a maritime survey (seabed mapping by sonar bathymetry) ship operated by the Finnish state owned company Meritaito. The vessel was modified and specifically customized for this role after its military service. Meritaito was renamed Arctia during Pohjanmeri's service. In 2026 Arctia decided to dispose of the ship and she was moved to a shipyard for scrapping and recycling in July 2026.
