= Fredrik Henrik af Chapman =

Swedish Navy officer, shipwright and scientist (1721–1808)

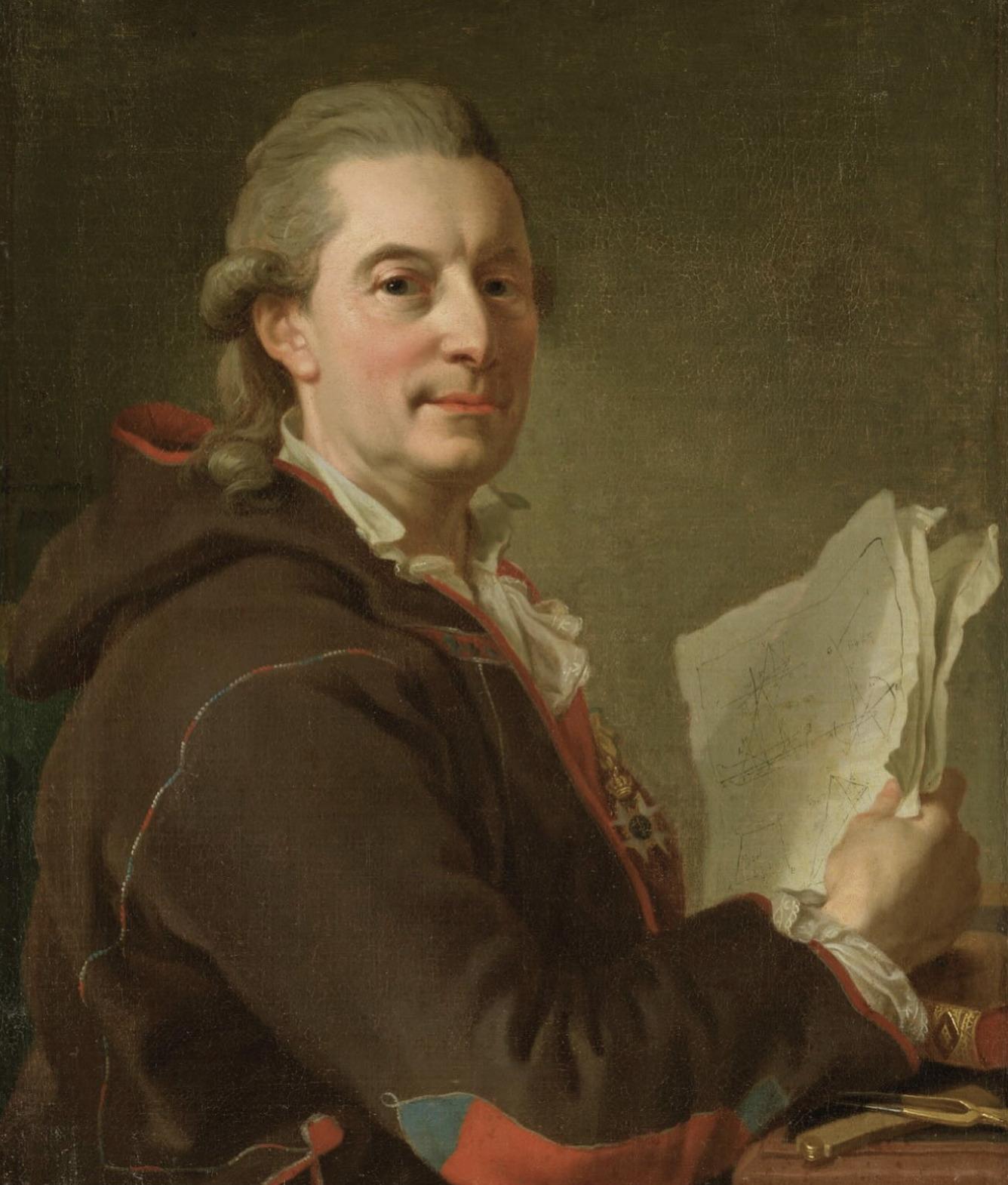
- Portrait by Lorens Pasch the Younger, 1778
- Born: 9 September 1721; Gothenburg, Sweden
- Died: 19 August 1808 (aged 86); Sweden
- Military career
- Allegiance: Sweden
- Branch: Swedish Navy
- Rank: Vice admiral
- Awards: Order of Vasa

Vice-Admiral Fredrik Henrik af Chapman (9 September 1721 – 19 August 1808) was a Swedish Navy officer, shipwright and scientist. Serving as the manager of the Karlskrona shipyard from 1782 to 1793, Chapman has been credited as the first person to apply scientific methods to shipbuilding and is considered to be the first naval architect.

Chapman was the author of Architectura Navalis Mercatoria (1768) and several other shipbuilding-related works. His Tractat om Skepps-Byggeriet ("Treatise on Shipbuilding") published in 1775 is a pioneering work in modern naval architecture. He was the first shipbuilder in Northern Europe to introduce prefabrication in shipyards and managed to produce several series of ships in record time. He was ennobled as "af Chapman" in 1772, after the successful coup of Gustav III of Sweden.

== Early life ==
Fredrik Henrik Chapman was born at Nya Varvet, the royal dockyards in Gothenburg, on 9 September 1721. He was the son of Thomas Chapman, a Yorkshireman born in 1679 who moved to Sweden in 1715 and joined the Swedish Navy in 1716. His mother was Susanna Colson, the daughter of the London shipwright William Colson. Chapman showed a talent for shipbuilding when he made his first body plan based on a drawing of an Ostend privateer given to him by a Flemish shipwright. Chapman went to sea in 1736, at the age of 15, and spent his late teens working in both private and state shipyards. In 1741, he helped build a Spanish merchantmen, a project that provided him with enough money to allow him to work as a ship's carpenter in London until 1744. Following his time in England, he returned to Gothenburg and established a shipyard with a Swedish merchant named Bagge. Together they built a few small vessels and provided maintenance work for the Swedish East India Company.

== Education ==
Though he had received a good basic education in shipbuilding, Chapman recognized that he did not possess the knowledge of higher mathematics that was required to determine draft and stability at the design stage of a vessel. In 1748, he sold his share of the shipyard and moved to Stockholm where he studied for two years under Baron Fredrik Palmqvist. He went on to study under the English professor of mathematics, Thomas Simpson, who had worked out methods for calculating the volume of irregular surfaces and bodies. After one year of studies in London, he went on to study shipbuilding at the British royal dockyards in Woolwich, Chatham and Deptford.

Chapman recorded his extensive research of British shipbuilding in several documents, including an eight-page handwritten document titled Directions for Building of a Ship of 50 Guns, where he described construction methods as well as the British method of launching ships. His activities attracted the interests of British authorities and upon leaving Deptfort in 1753, he was arrested. His papers were confiscated and he was charged with trying to lure shipyards workers into French service. Anglo-French relations were tense, and both Sweden and Denmark were active in uncovering British manufacturing methods as well as trying to persuade British shipwrights to enter their service. Chapman was kept under house arrest for about one month at the cost of half a guinea per day, though he was allowed to visit London with an escort. All of his documents were eventually returned to him except a rigging plan. After his release, he stayed a few months to study experimental physics and took lessons in engraving.

In 1754, Chapman continued his educational tour by going to the Netherlands and in 1755 to France, where he was given permission to stay at the royal shipyards at Brest to observe warship construction. There he observed the complete process of construction of the French 60-gun ship Célèbre from keel-laying to rigging under the French shipwright Geoffrey the Elder. He also made line drawings and plans of several French ships, including the huge Ville de Paris and the 64-gun Bienfaisant and pen and ink drawings of ship decorations. The experience in Brest is believed to have made a deep impression on Chapman, later contributing to his conviction that 60-gun ships were the most appropriate for Swedish service.

French authorities were the first to recognize Chapman's skills and attempted to convince him to stay and enter service for France, an offer he declined. After Chapman returned to London in 1756, First Lord of the Admiralty Lord Temple tried to do the same, and came close to succeeding by using patriotic appeals to Chapman's English heritage. In his memoirs, Chapman wrote that he would likely have stayed had Temple not been replaced as First Lord of the Admiralty by Lord Winchilsea soon after their meeting. Instead, he was recruited by the Swedish minister in Paris, Ulrik Scheffer, later Minister of External Affairs under Gustav III.

== In Swedish service ==
In 1757, Chapman was made assistant shipwright at the royal dockyards in Karlskrona at the age of 36. Soon after his appointment, he drafted his ideal plans for docks, which included facilities for properly ventilated sail storage and advanced dock pumps that could be powered by human power, horses or wind mills. The plans would, however, not be realized until much later, when Chapman was made chief shipwright of the Karlskrona yards.

In November 1758 to April 1759, he was charged with a timber inspection cruise along the coasts from Turku up to the Gulf of Bothnia. Later, Chapman moved first to Stralsund (then a Swedish possession) where he stayed until 1762, and later to Sveaborg where he stayed until 1764. His first major assignment came in 1760. The recently formed archipelago fleet (skärgårdsflottan), an inshore fleet independent of the navy under the command of the army, was in need of new vessels to replace the galleys which had proved problematic in the war against Prussia that had broken out in 1757. Augustin Ehrensvärd, the commander of the archipelago fleet and the man in charge of the construction of the new naval base and fortress of Sveaborg, began a successful collaboration with Chapman in designing new types of what would later be called "archipelago frigates" (skärgårdsfregatter). Inspired by Russian "chebecks" (variants of Mediterranean xebecs, hybrid sailing ships that incorporated features of galleys), the two created craft that could be rowed, but with heavier armament and additional protection for the crew, a necessity in the cold Baltic climate. The cooperation resulted in four new types of archipelago frigates: udema, pojama, turuma and hemmema, all named after the Finnish names of Swedish provinces in Finland, the coasts of which they were intended to protect.

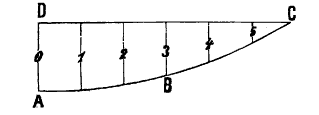
Chapman's parabola method.

By closely examining drawings of ships with known good sailing qualities Chapman realized that the framework should be divided in a certain progression. The frames should decrease from the place of greatest width in the same relation as the ordinates 0, 1, 2, 3, 4 etc. (pictured), where the arc ABC is a parabola, AD is the axis and A is the vertex (the "peak"). This construction method is called the "parabola method". Chapman also introduced the so called "relaxation method", but preferred the former himself.

At Sveaborg, Chapman supervised and led the construction and expansion of the naval yards, including cranes, docks and various buildings. He moved to Stockholm in 1764, but remained in charge of the design of vessels for the archipelago fleet. He was also made a part of a commission that was to propose improvements on the expansion of the high seas navy. Its final report was presented in 1764 and recommended new designs for standardized ships of the line ranging from 50 to 70 guns. The report represented the ideals of a new school of shipwrights that favored scientific methods and the use of theoretical models at all stages in ship design, a view that was in conflict with the old school, which favored slow evolution based on practical experimentation. The old school, represented most prominently by Gilbert Sheldon, came into conflict with the new ideas, but lost the debate when the Board of the Admiralty favored the findings of the commission at the Riksdag in March 1769 and put Chapman in charge of designing the navy's new warships.

== Djurgården yard ==
Chapman acquired a share in a shipyard at Djurgården in Stockholm in 1768. A conglomerate of the Åkers gun foundry and owners of the Swedish East India Company provided the capital, while Chapman was to contribute his technical skills and experience with shipbuilding. The same year he moved into a newly built house in Djurgården with his nephew Lars Bogeman and his former housekeeper Elisabeth Lindborg, with whom he had a daughter and son. Chapman constructed a new type of saw mill for the Djurgården yard that replaced the traditional "saw pit" with a circular blade at the center of an octagonal building. A system of chains and pulleys pulled lengths of timber towards the saw, which could receive them from eight different directions.

The Djurgården yard produced several of Chapman's own designs that were successful, including cats, barques and East Indiamen in 1767-79. Some of the latter were named in honor of King Gustav and were launched in the presence of the royal family. This included praise from Carl Michael Bellman, one of Sweden's most popular composers and at the time a favorite of the court. The yard constructed merchant vessels as well as warships under contract from the military. During Chapman's time at the yard over 50 vessels of various sizes were constructed, including the first so-called archipelago frigates, the udemas, pojamas and turumas.

== "Royal Revolution" ==
In 1772, king Gustav III accomplished what was described as a "royal revolution". Since the death of Charles XII in 1718 and Sweden's reduction to the status of a minor power, the country's politics had been dominated by the Riksdag, the Swedish parliament, with frequent intervention by Russia, Great Britain, France and Denmark through bribes and subsidies. Gustav's palace coup established him as a self-defined enlightened despot while curbing the influence of nobility, which had become unpopular through rampant corruption and political intrigues. Inspired by the absolute monarchy of France, Gustav took great inspiration from the "Sun King" Louis XIV (1638–1715) and allied himself with his successor Louis XV.

Chapman supported the king's boldness and even gave concrete assistance by warehousing ammunition for troops that were loyal to the king. The maneuver paid off since Gustav supported an expansion of both army and navy and singled out Russia as the primary enemy of Swedish interests. The alliance with Louis XV meant that large French subsidies were sent to expand the Swedish military against the common Russian enemy. This provided the funds to finance Chapman's plans to expand the navy with 60- to 70-gun warships of his own design.

== Navy expansion ==
In 1776, Chapman became a civilian member of the Board of the Admiralty. His influence on the board and favor with the king resulted in critical reports of the current habit of the high seas navy to keep old ships afloat at great expense rather than spending more resources on building new, improved ships. Chapman's recommendations for improvements of the Karlskrona facilities was also received positively and approved by the king. The same year he was elected into the Royal Swedish Academy of Sciences as member number 175.

An expansion of the navy was seen as necessary, but the design of the new ships was still a matter of debate in the late 1770s. The old school of shipwrights, most prominently supported by the Sheldon family and senior navy officers like Admiral Carl Tersmeden in Karlskrona, favored the old design with only minimal alterations based on the older methods of empirically grounded ship design. The new school, based in Stockholm and Sveaborg had in Chapman its most capable representative and was supported by General Admiral Henrik af Trolle and the court, pushed for more radical changes and designs based on the theoretical designs and experimental physics and mathematics. Chapman's first proposal for a new standard for ships of the line was the Wasa (1778), completed in 1778. Its superstructures were lowered considerably by removing the poop deck almost entirely to add stiffness and the gun decks were placed higher than in older designs to allow them to be used even in rough weather, when the ship rolled.

The Wasa went through sea trials in 1779 where it was compared with Sofia Magdalena, a ship of the older design which was favored by the conservative factions within the establishment. The Wasa to some degree outperformed Sofia Magdalena, but never completely outclassed it. The opposition took advantage while Chapman was convinced he needed to make only minimal adjustments to his design to produce a vastly superior warship. The portrayal of the conflict as conservative reactionaries versus progressive pioneers is shared by several historical authors, including Daniel G. Harris, Chapman's modern biographer. This includes descriptions of action approaching sabotage in providing substandard rigging material for the Wasa and outright insubordination on the part of Gilbert Sheldon by making the hull 60 cm (2 ft) shorter than planned. Swedish Jan Glete has argued this description is partial to Chapman and his supporters and stressed the political nature of the conflict; Chapman and af Trolle were both close to the royal circles and their aims coincided with those of king Gustav III, who wished to assert control of the armed forces and to portray himself as an enlightened monarch who encouraged innovation against the conservative navy establishment in Karlskrona.

Chapman also worked out several improvements of the royal shipyards that he supervised, including recommendations for the use of sheds to protect ships from deterioration when they were in reserve, something that was particularly important for the often lightly built galleys. Showing considerable organization skills, he made detailed plans on how to make naval vessels ready for quick mobilization and proposed a more efficient system of management for shipyards based on his experiences in Sweden and abroad.

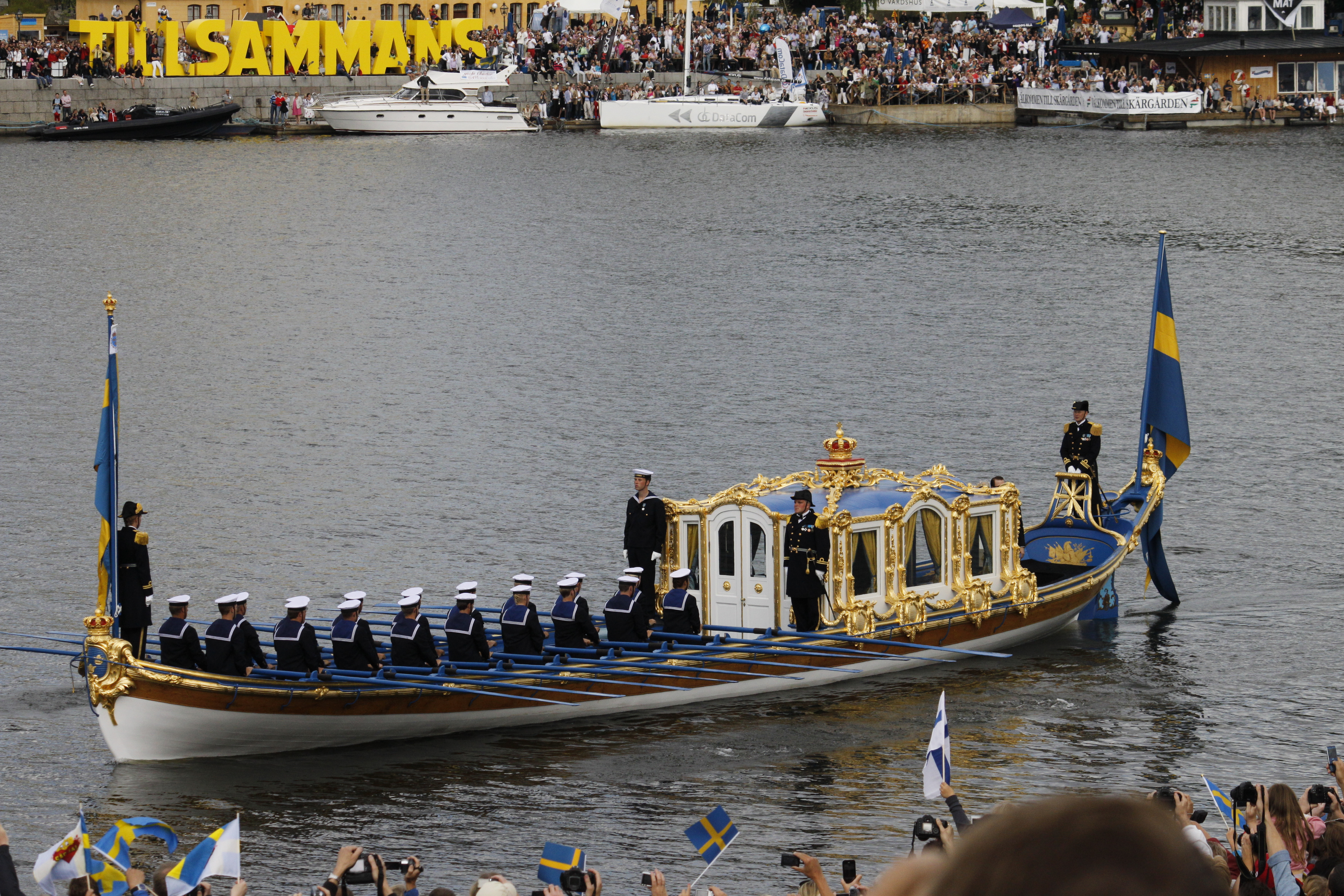
The 1923 reconstruction of the royal barge Vasaorden, which was originally designed by Chapman in 1774 for Gustav III

Asked by king Gustav III to comment on Patrick Miller's warship Experiment, which Miller had sent to the king, Chapman called it the "English (sic) sea-spook". The king sent Miller a snuff box filled with rutabaga seeds to show his gratitude. The snuff box, illustrated with marine motifs, including Experiment, is now in the collection of the Victoria & Albert Museum in London.

At the age of 60, he was appointed head of the naval shipyard at the main naval base of Karlskrona. Here, he built new ships and organized production series for ships based on prefabrication methods, which meant that he could deliver twenty new ships in just three years, ten ships-of-the-line and ten frigates. Chapman also became a pioneer in the application of mathematical calculations in the relation between rigging, displacement, water resistance, the center of gravity of hulls, stability and tonnage.

In order to test his mathematical theories, he had a 100 m-long (330 ft) pool constructed outside Karlskrona, where he tested various hull designs with scale models. The models were pulled through the water with pulleys and ropes. This method gave realistic values and is similar to the method used today to establish the hydrodynamic features of new hull designs.

== Architectura Navalis Mercatoria ==
In 1765 Chapman applied for permission from his work as a chief naval builder for the Archipelago Fleet at the naval base at Sveaborg to work on Architectura Navalis Mercatoria, a collection of contemporary ship types that he considered to be the best and most interesting. The work had been commissioned by Duke Charles, the brother of king Gustav and was published in 1768. The book contained 62 illustrations of ships and smaller vessels, both Swedish and foreign designs. Some of these were Chapman's own designs, but many were also types that he had seen during visits to foreign countries. Everything from large warships to small fishing vessels were represented.

The book was intended for an international audience and the text was available in Swedish, French and English. All measurements were given in Swedish, French and English feet. However, it took seven years to finish the accompanying explanatory texts. The charts and the following Tractat om Skepps-byggeriet ("Treatise on shipbuilding") in 1775 launched Chapman as one of the leading experts on ship building in the world.

A further advance in the general theory was made on the appearance in 1775 of a work on the construction of ships by the Swedish Constructor—Admiral Frederick Henry de Chapman. This was translated into French by Vial du Clairbois, 1779, and into English by Dr. Inman, 1820. It contains the first published record of the use of Simpson's rules for approximate quadrature, and the calculations of displacement, centre of buoyancy, and metacentre given in the book closely resemble those made at the present day.

== Gallery ==
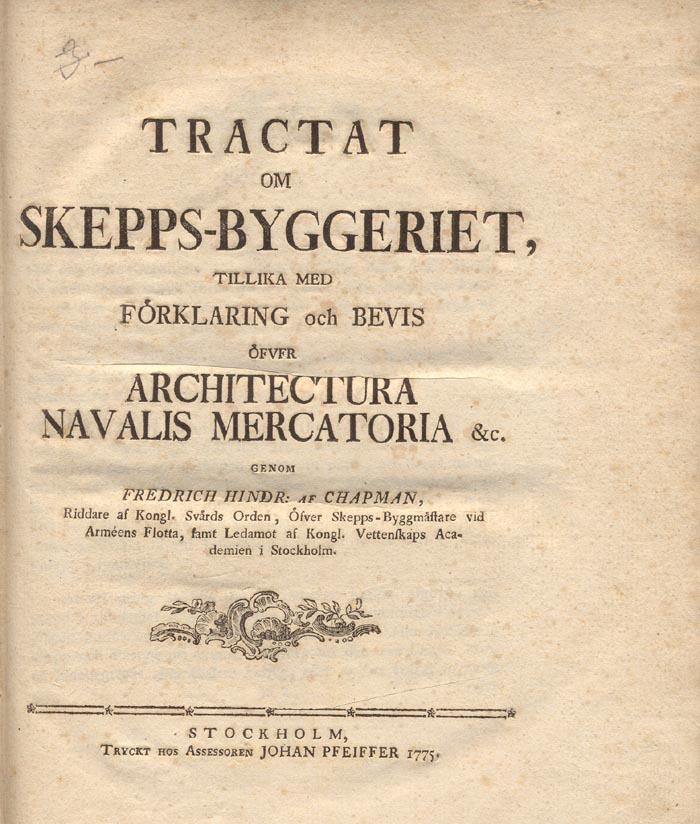
Title page of Tractat om Skepps-byggeriet

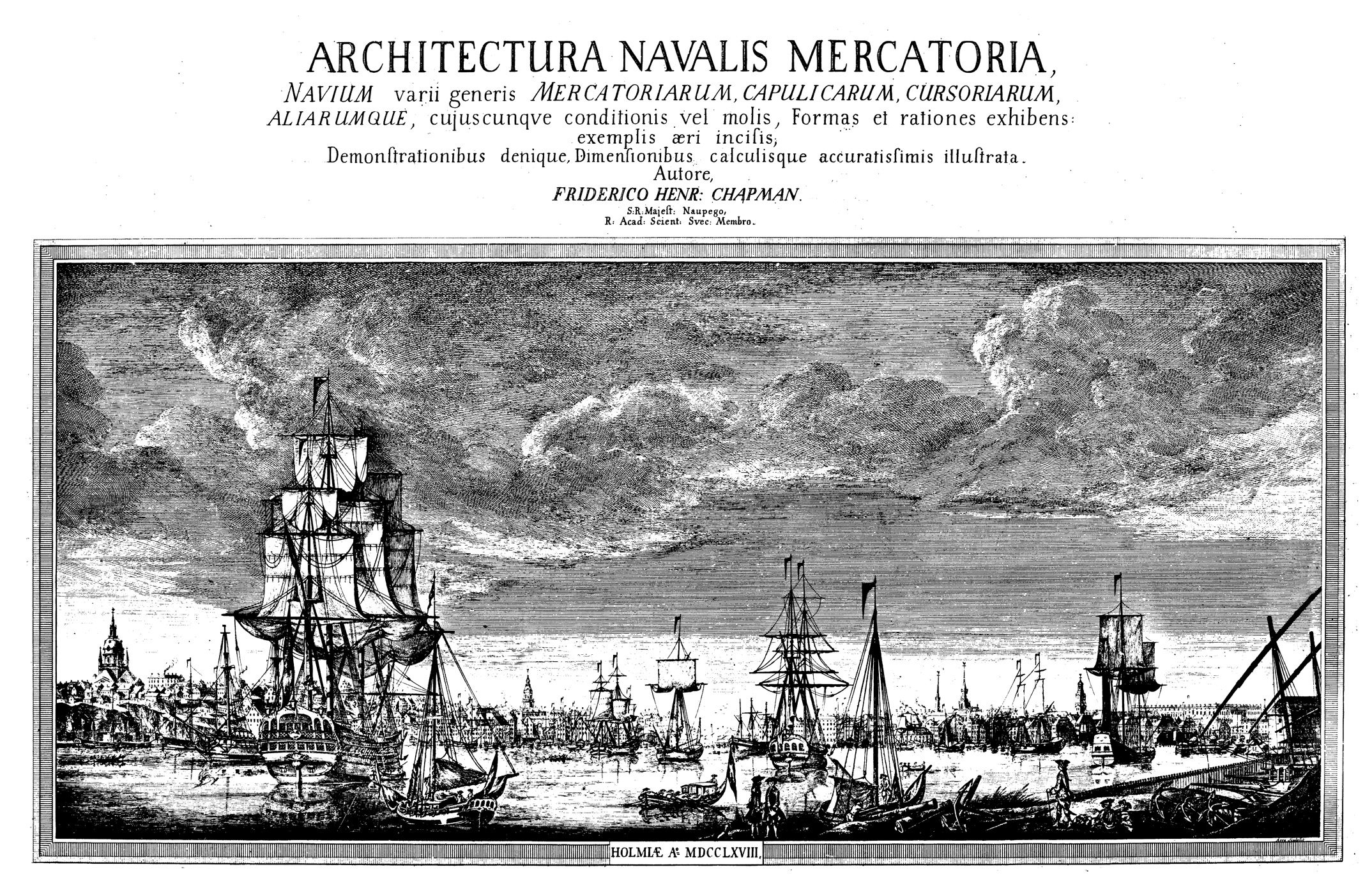
Title page of Architectura Navalis Mercatoria, published 1768.

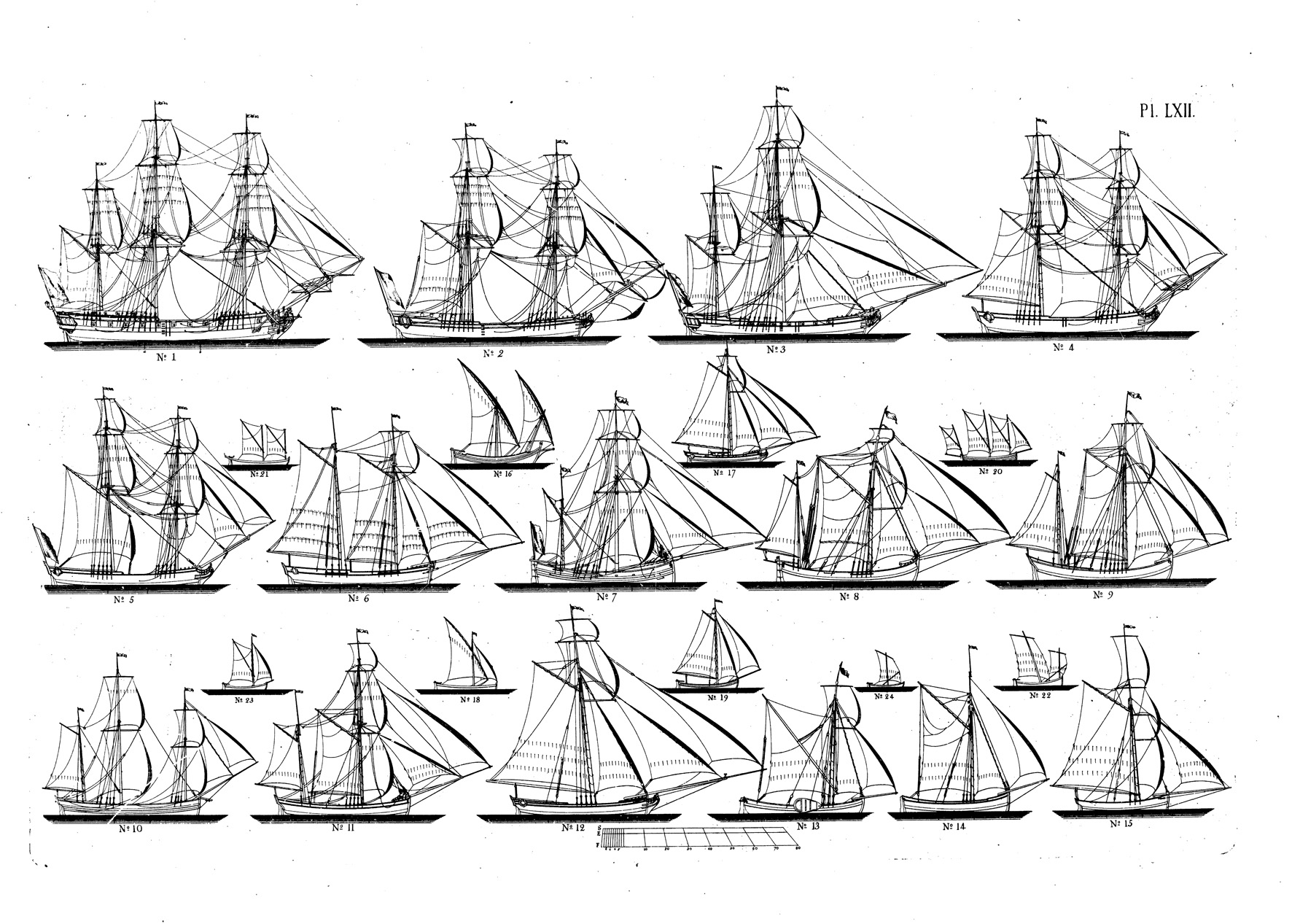
Summary of the sailing ships described in Architectura Navalis Mercatoria.

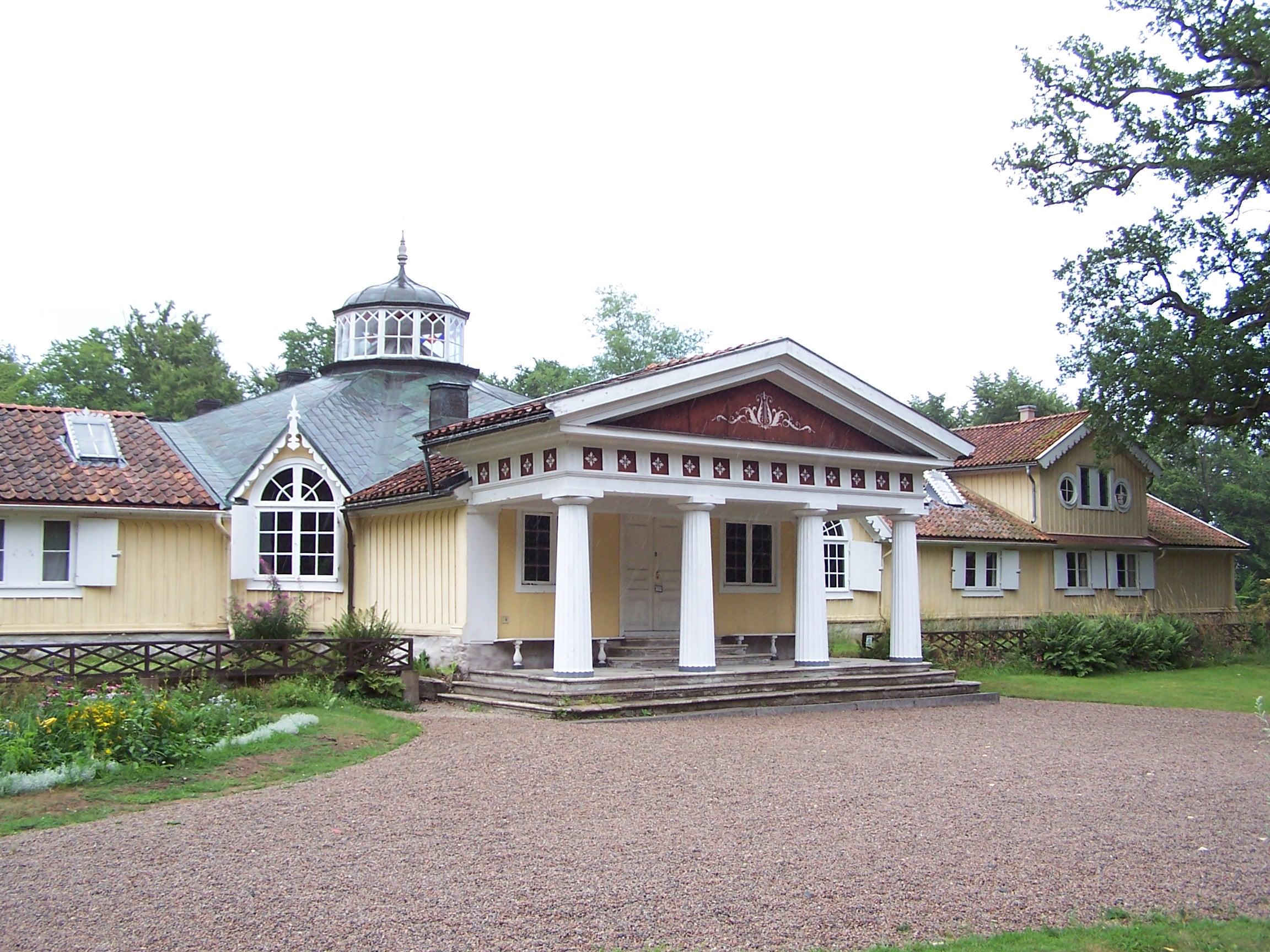
The Skärva estate, Chapman's residence (built 1785-86)

== Ships designed by af Chapman ==
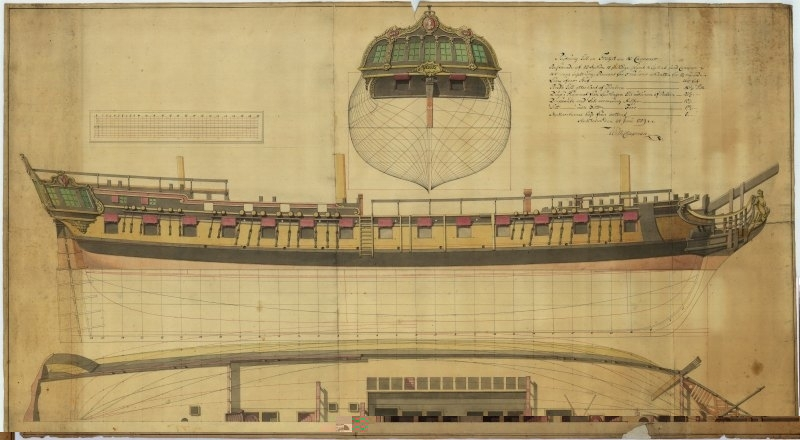
A schematic of the Bellona-class frigate Venus (launched 1783), drawn by Chapman in 1789

- Amphion
- Jacobstads Wapen
- Vasaorden
- Galten
- Delfinen
- Wasa
- Dristigheten
- Konung Gustaf III
- Äran
- Konung Adolf Fredrik
- Försiktigheten
- Kronprins Gustaf Adolf
- Fäderneslandet
- Venus
- Bellona-class frigates
- Hemmema
- Pojama
- Turuma
- Udema

== Bibliography ==
- Architectura Navalis Mercatoria. Stockholm. 1768.
- Tractat om Skepps-byggeriet. Stockholm. 1775.
- Försök till theoretisk afhandling att gifva linjeskepp och fregatter deras rätta form. 1806.
