= Boothia =

Boothia may refer to:

- The Boothia Peninsula, a peninsula in Nunavut, Canada
- The Gulf of Boothia, a body of water in Nunavut, Canada
