= Pohjanmaa-class corvette =

Finnish Navy warship class

- Preliminary 3D rendering of the Pohjanmaa class

Class overview
- Name: Pohjanmaa-class corvette
- Builders: Rauma Marine Constructions
- Operators: Finnish Navy
- Preceded by: Rauma class; Hämeenmaa class; Pohjanmaa
- Cost: About 1.3 billion euro for 4 ships
- Built: 2023–present
- In commission: 2027– (first ship); 2029– (all ships)
- On order: 4
- Building: 4

General characteristics
- Type: Corvette
- Displacement: 4,300 t (4,200 long tons)
- Length: 117 m (383 ft 10 in)
- Beam: 16 m (52 ft 6 in)
- Draught: 5 m (16 ft 5 in)
- Ice class: 1A (Finnish class)
- Installed power: 1 × GE LM2500 gas turbine; 4 × MAN 12V175D-MEL generating sets (4 × 1,920 kW)
- Propulsion: Combined diesel-electric and gas (CODLAG) propulsion; 28 MW (38,000 hp); 2 × controllable pitch propellers; 2 × bow thrusters
- Speed: 26 knots (48 km/h; 30 mph)
- Range: 3,500 nmi (6,500 km; 4,000 mi)
- Endurance: 14 days
- Complement: 70
- Sensors & processing systems: Systems: Saab 9LV CMS (combat management system); Saab Lightweight Integrated Mast (SLIM); Radars: 4 × Sea Giraffe 4A FF (3D, S-band (IEEE), AESA radar); 1 × Sea Giraffe 1X (3D, X-band (IEEE), AESA radar); Electro-optical sensors: 2 × Saab CEROS 200 (optronic and radar tracking fire control director); Sonars: Patria dual-tow Sonac DTS (a ASW sonar with 1 × active variable depth sonar + 1 × passive towed thin-line receiving array); 1 × Kongsberg SS2030 (hull-mounted ASW sonar); 1 × Kongsberg SD9500; Communications: Saab TactiCall integrated communication system; Satellite; UHF; Navigation: Exail Marins M3 INS (inertial navigation system); Exail Phins (redundant INS); Netans DDU (Data Distribution Units)
- Electronic warfare & decoys: Systems: Saab NLWS (naval laser warning system); Saab ESM; Saab SIGINT; Counter-measures: 4 × Rheinmetall MASS decoy systems
- Armament: Torpedoes: 2 × Saab Dynamics Tub m/20 torpedo launchers, launching Saab lightweight torpedo; Missiles: 1 × 8-cell Mk 41 VLS, with 4 × RIM-162 ESSM Block 2 (ITO 20) anti-air missiles per cell; 2 × 4-cell launchers with Gabriel V (PTO 2020) anti-ship missiles; Naval guns: 1 × Bofors 57 mm/70 SAK Mk3, with Bofors 3P airburst munitions; RCWS: 2 × Saab Trackfire; Naval mines: Stern rails for 100 × PB 17 naval mines
- Aviation facilities: Helicopter deck: 1 × deck at the stern; Aircraft hangar: Dimensioned for 1 midsize helicopter (such as the NH90) and a UAV

The Pohjanmaa class is a series of four multi-role corvettes under construction for the Finnish Navy as part of the Squadron 2020 (Finnish: Laivue 2020) programme. The class is intended to form the core of Finland’s surface combatant fleet together with the four Hamina-class missile boats.

The Pohjanmaa-class corvettes will replace several older vessels that have already been decommissioned or are scheduled for retirement, including the minelayer Pohjanmaa, the two Hämeenmaa-class minelayers, and the four Rauma-class missile boats. The new vessels are expected to enter service in the late 2020s.

== Design ==
=== General characteristics ===
The overall length of the Pohjanmaa-class corvettes is 117 metres (383 ft 10 in) and the beam 16 metres (52 ft 6 in). The maximum draught of the vessels is 5 metres (16 ft 5 in), corresponding to a displacement of about 4,300 tonnes (4,200 long tons). With these dimensions, the multi-role corvettes are the largest Finnish surface combatants since the 1930s coastal defence ships Ilmarinen and Väinämöinen. Each ship will have a complement of about 70 officers and crew.

Designed for year-round service in the seasonally freezing Baltic Sea, the ships feature an ice-strengthened hull and the ability to operate independently in ice conditions. Although no formal Finnish-Swedish ice class exists for naval vessels, their ice capability has been described as equivalent to ice class 1A for merchant ships.

The Pohjanmaa class features a combined diesel-electric and gas (CODLAG) propulsion system with a total output of 28 megawatts (38,000 hp). During normal operations, the ships' twin ice-strengthened controllable pitch propellers are driven by electric propulsion motors. Electrical power is generated by four 12-cylinder MAN 12V175D diesel generating sets, two of which are mounted on resilient foundations within soundproof enclosures to reduce noise and vibration during anti-submarine warfare operations.

For high-speed operations, a single General Electric LM2500 gas turbine driving both propeller shafts via a common gearbox provides a maximum speed in excess of 26 knots (48 km/h; 30 mph). For low-speed manoeuvring, the ships are fitted with two bow thrusters.

=== Combat management system, communication system and sensors ===
The combat management system (CMS) of the Pohjanmaa-class corvettes is provided by the Swedish defence company Saab. The system is based on Saab's 9LV CMS and incorporates the TactiCall integrated communication system.

The sensor suite includes Sea Giraffe 4A FF fixed-face active electronically scanned array (AESA) radar and Sea Giraffe 1X short-range 3D radar mounted on Saab's Lightweight Integrated Mast (SLIM), as well as two CEROS 200 fire-control directors and a laser warning system. Prior to the selection of Saab, the Finnish Navy had shortlisted Saab, Lockheed Martin Canada, and Atlas Elektronik as potential CMS providers and integrators.

The underwater sensor suite consists of Kongsberg's SS2030 hull-mounted sonar and SD9500 lightweight dipping sonar. In addition, the ships are equipped with Patria's Sonac DTS dual-towed sonar system, which combines an active variable-depth sonar and a passive towed array for anti-submarine warfare.

=== Armament ===
Pohjanmaa-class corvettes are equipped with a dual-purpose naval gun, surface-to-surface missiles, surface-to-air missiles, anti-submarine torpedoes, naval mines, close-in weapon systems, and decoy launchers. The forward-mounted Bofors 57 mm Mk3 dual-purpose main gun is reused from the Hamina-class missile boats. In addition, each corvette is fitted with two Saab Trackfire remote controlled weapon stations for close-range defence and four Rheinmetall Multi Ammunition Softkill System (MASS) decoy launchers.

The primary surface-to-surface armament is the Gabriel 5 anti-ship missile, designated PTO 2020 (Pintatorjuntaohjus 2020) in Finnish service. For air defence, the ships are armed with the Raytheon RIM-162 Evolved Sea Sparrow Missile (ESSM) Block 2. Each vessel is capable of carrying up to 32 missiles, quad-packed in eight Mark 41 Vertical Launching System cells. In Finnish Navy service, the system is designated ITO 20 (Ilmatorjuntaohjus 20).

For anti-submarine warfare, the corvettes are equipped with Saab Torped 47 lightweight torpedoes. The ships also retain a minelaying capability, reflecting the Finnish Navy's traditional emphasis on naval mine warfare.

== Development and construction ==
Development of the new surface combatants for the Finnish Navy began with research and planning in 2008, and the Squadron 2020 project was officially launched in 2015. The €647.6 million shipbuilding contract was awarded to Finnish shipbuilder Rauma Marine Constructions in September 2019.

During the detailed design phase, the shipyard announced in November 2021 that additional time would be required to complete the design work. As of June 2022, the delay was estimated to be 14 to 18 months.

- Construction of the lead ship began on 30 October 2023, and the keel was laid on 11 April 2024. The hull was completed in February 2025. The ship was ceremonially launched on 21 May 2025.
- Construction of the second ship began on 9 October 2024, and the keel was laid on 8 May 2025. The launching ceremony for the second hull was held on 21 May 2026, exactly one year after the first one.
- Construction of the third ship began on 26 August 2025 and the keel was laid on 14 January 2026. The ship was launched on 29 October 2026.
- Construction of the fourth and final ship also began on 14 January 2026 and the keel was laid on 4 August 2026.

The lead ship is scheduled to begin sea trials in 2026 and enter service in 2027. All four vessels are expected to be completed by 2029.

== Naming ==
Naming major combat vessels after regions of Finland has long been a tradition of the Finnish Navy. The name Pohjanmaa, the Finnish name for the historical province of Ostrobothnia, has been used for several ships and ship classes in both the Finnish and Swedish navies. The earliest known vessel bearing the name was Gamla Pojama ("Old Pohjanmaa"), launched in 1760. The most recent was the minelayer and training ship Pohjanmaa, which remained in service until it was sold in 2016.

The original 18th-century Pohjanmaa type was one of the four principal archipelago frigate types of the Swedish archipelago fleet, alongside the Hämeenmaa, Uusimaa, and Turunmaa classes. These vessels played an important role in the Battle of Svensksund in 1790, one of Sweden's greatest naval victories and the largest naval battle ever fought in the Baltic Sea.

== Criticism ==
=== Classification ===
While the Finnish Navy and the Ministry of Defence officially classify the new vessels as multi-role corvettes, several commentators have argued that, based on their displacement of about 4,300 tonnes (4,200 long tons), the ships more closely correspond to frigates. (Note: Corvettes are traditionally considered the smallest class of ocean-going warships, typically displacing up to about 3,000 tonnes, with frigates representing the next larger category.) Following the award of the construction contract in September 2019, Member of Parliament Johannes Yrttiaho (Left Alliance) submitted a written question to the Parliament of Finland concerning, among other issues, the classification of the vessels.

In an official Finnish Defence Forces blog, Flotilla admiral Jori Harju, Commander of the Finnish Navy, explained that the increased displacement was partly due to structural strengthening of the hull, propulsion shaft lines, and propellers required for year-round operation in ice-prone Finnish waters. He also noted that the Pohjanmaa class is intended primarily for operations in coastal and littoral areas, whereas frigates are traditionally associated with sustained operations on the high seas as part of a blue-water navy.

=== Size ===
Since the early 2000s, the Finnish Navy's surface combatant fleet has consisted primarily of fast attack craft with displacements of about 250 to 300 tonnes (250 to 300 long tons). Until the introduction of the Pohjanmaa class, the largest surface combatants in Finnish service are the two 1,450-tonne Hämeenmaa-class minelayers.

Several commentators have criticised the Squadron 2020 programme because of the relatively large size of the new corvettes. Critics have argued that the vessels are too large for Finland's shallow and confined coastal waters and could present more prominent targets for Russian anti-ship missiles. It has also been suggested that the ship size reflects requirements for international operations rather than purely national defence, and that the concept may have been influenced by the United States Navy's Freedom-class littoral combat ships.

The Finnish Navy has stated that the increased size results from the requirement to combine several roles within a single platform. In particular, the ability to lay naval mines—one of the Navy’s core missions—requires significant payload capacity and internal volume, which in turn necessitates a larger hull. The Navy has further emphasised that, despite superficial similarities to foreign vessel classes, the Pohjanmaa class has been specifically designed for Finnish operational requirements in the Baltic Sea and does not directly derive from any existing ship class.

== Ships in class ==
Name	Hull No.	IMO number	Status	Contract	First steel cut	Laid down	Launched	Commissioned
–	–	4764850	Fitting out	26 Sep 2019	30 Oct 2023	11 Apr 2024	21 May 2025	2027 to 2029 (planned)
–	–	4764862	Fitting out	26 Sep 2019	9 Oct 2024	8 May 2025	21 May 2026	2027 to 2029 (planned)
–	–	4764874	Launched	26 Sep 2019	26 Aug 2025	14 Jan 2026	29 Oct 2026	2027 to 2029 (planned)
–	–	4764886	Keel laid	26 Sep 2019	14 Jan 2026	4 Aug 2026	–	2027 to 2029 (planned)

== See also ==
- List of corvette classes in service

=== Equivalent modern corvettes ===
- Kamorta class
- Diponegoro class
- Steregushchiy class
- Ada class
- Sa'ar 6 class
- Braunschweig class
