= List of decommissioned ships of the Finnish Navy =

This is a list of former vessels of the Finnish Navy.

== Coastal defence ships ==
Name	Origin	Commissioned	Decommissioned/lost	Image	Details
Ilmarinen	Finland	1931	Sunk in 1941		
Väinämöinen	Finland	1932	1945		Handed over to the Soviet Union as war reparations, renamed Vyborg, and broken up in 1966

== Submarines ==
Vetehinen-class submarines
Name	Origin	Commissioned	Decommissioned	Image	Details
Vetehinen	Finland	1930	1946		Scrapped in the 1950s
Vesihiisi	Finland	1931	1946		Scrapped in the 1950s
Iku-Turso	Finland	1931	1946		Scrapped in the 1950s
Vesikko-class submarine
Vesikko	Finland	1933	1946		Museum ship since 1973
Saukko-class submarine
Saukko	Finland	1930	1945		Scrapped in 1952
AG-class submarines
AG 12	Russian Empire	Never commissioned in Finnish service			Scuttled by the Imperial Russian Navy in 1918; scrapped in the 1920s
AG 16	Russian Empire	Never commissioned in Finnish service			Scuttled by the Imperial Russian Navy in 1918; scrapped in 1929

== Icebreakers ==
Name	Origin	Commissioned	Decommissioned	Image	Details
Aallokas	Finland	1936	1945		In naval service in Lake Ladoga. Handed over to the Soviet Union as war reparations, renamed Sheksna, and broken up in 1961
Apu	German Empire	1899	1959		Part of the Escort Flotilla under the Finnish Navy during the Second World War. Broken up in 1959.
Jääkarhu	Netherlands	1925	1945		Part of the Icebreaker Flotilla under the Finnish Navy during the Second World War. Handed over to the Soviet Union as war reparations, renamed Sibiryakov, and broken up in 1972
Murtaja	Sweden	1889	1958		In naval service during the First World War and Second World War (Escort Flotilla). Broken up in 1958.
Otso	Finland	1936	1970s		Part of the Escort Flotilla under the Finnish Navy during the Second World War. Retired from icebreaking and sold in the 1970s.
Tarmo	United Kingdom	1908	1970		In naval service during the First World War, Finnish Civil War, and Second World War (Icebreaker Flotilla). Retired in 1970 and preserved as a museum ship in Kotka, Finland.
Sampo	United Kingdom	1898	1960		In naval service during the First World War, Finnish Civil War, and Second World War (Icebreaker Flotilla). Broken up in 1960.
Sisu	Finland	1938	1947 (1949)		Secondary use as a Finnish Navy submarine tender in the Submarine Flotilla during the summer months until 1947. Briefly used as a gunnery training ship in 1949. Retired from icebreaking service and transferred to the Finnish Navy in 1975, decommissioned and broken up in 1986.
Louhi	Finland	1975	1986		Secondary use as a Finnish Navy submarine tender in the Submarine Flotilla during the summer months until 1947. Briefly used as a gunnery training ship in 1949. Retired from icebreaking service and transferred to the Finnish Navy in 1975, decommissioned and broken up in 1986.
Voima	Finland	1924	1945		Part of the Icebreaker Flotilla under the Finnish Navy during the Second World War. Handed over to the Soviet Union as war reparations, renamed Malygin, and broken up in 1971
Voima	Finland	1954	1955		Briefly in service with the Finnish Navy
Wäinämöinen	German Empire	1918	1922		Captured from Soviet Russia in 1918, briefly in naval service during the First World War, and returned to Estonia in 1922 under the Treaty of Tartu. Today a museum ship in Tallinn, Estonia.

== Mine warfare ==
=== Minelayers ===
- Louhi (Finnish service: 1918–1945; fate: sunk 1945)
- Sveaborg (Finnish service: 1918–1930s; fate: sold to Estonia 1930s)
- Keihässalmi (Finnish service: 1957–1994; fate: museum ship)
- Pohjanmaa (Finnish service: 1979–2013; fate: scrapped 2026)

==== Ruotsinsalmi-class minelayers ====
- Riilahti (Finnish service: 1940–1943; fate: sunk 1943)
- Ruotsinsalmi (Finnish service: 1940–1975; fate: scrapped 1990s)

==== Teplokhod-class minelayers ====
Also known as minelaying boats or T-class boats.

- Pommi
- Miina
- Lieska
- Loimu
- Paukku

==== Pukkio-class minelayers ====
- Porkkala
- Pukkio
- Pansio

==== Requisitioned minelayers ====
- Baltic
- Frej
- Poseidon
- Suomi

=== Minesweepers ===
- Ajonpää
- Kallanpää
- Purunpää
- Vahterpää
- Tammenpää
- Katanpää

==== Rautu-class minesweepers ====
- Rautu
- Vilppula

==== SM-class minesweepers ====
- SM 1
- SM 2
- SM 3
- SM 4

==== Ahven-class minesweepers ====
- Ahven
- Kiiski
- Muikku
- Särki
- Kuore
- Lahna

==== Kuha-class minesweepers (1941) ====
- Kuha
- Salakka
- Siika
- Harjus
- Säynäs
- Karppi
- Kuha 7
- Kuha 8
- Kuha 9
- Kuha 10
- Kuha 11
- Kuha 12
- Kuha 13
- Kuha 14
- Kuha 15
- Kuha 16
- Kuha 17
- Kuha 18

==== Kuha-class minesweepers (1974) ====
- Kuha 22 (22)
- Kuha 25 (25)

==== Kiiski class minesweepers ====
- Kiiski 2 (522)

==== A-class minesweepers ====
- A-1
- A-5

==== DR-class minesweepers ====
Former United States Army Design 257-A 74-foot tugs.

- DR-1
- DR-2
- DR-3
- DR-5
- DR-6
- DR-7
- DR-8
- DR-9
- DR-10
- DR-11
- DR-15
- DR-17
- DR-18

== Gunboats ==
- Hämeenmaa
- Uusimaa
- Klas Horn
- Matti Kurki
- Karjala
- Turunmaa
- Aunus
- Gilyak
- Tampere
- Viena
- 1

== Frigates ==
=== Riga class ===
- Hämeenmaa (1964-1987)
- Uusimaa (1964-1979)

=== Bay class ===
- Matti Kurki (1962-1975)

== Corvettes ==
- Karjala
- Turunmaa

== Patrol/ASW vessels ==
=== Kiisla-class patrol boats ===
- Kiisla
- Kurki

== Escort vessels ==
- Aura
- Aura II
- Uisko
- Tursas
- Viipuri
- 762

== Fast attack craft ==
Name	Origin	Commissioned	Decommissioned	Image	Details
Tuima	Soviet Union	1966	2000		Sold to Egypt in 2006
Tuisku	Soviet Union	1966	2000		Sold to Egypt in 2006
Tuuli	Soviet Union	1966	2000		Sold to Egypt in 2006
Tyrsky	Soviet Union	1966	2000		Sold to Egypt in 2006
Helsinki (60)	Finland	1981	2007		Two sold to Croatia in 2008, two used for testing of stress damage from sea-mine blasts.
Turku (61)	Finland	1981	2007		Two sold to Croatia in 2008, two used for testing of stress damage from sea-mine blasts.
Oulu (62)	Finland	1981	2007		Two sold to Croatia in 2008, two used for testing of stress damage from sea-mine blasts.
Kotka (63)	Finland	1981	2007		Two sold to Croatia in 2008, two used for testing of stress damage from sea-mine blasts.

== Torpedo boats ==
- S1
- S2
- S3
- S4
- S5
- S6
- C1
- C2
- C3
- C4
- Minonosets 214
- Minonosets 218
- Minonosets 220
- Minonosets 222

=== Sisu-class motor torpedo boats ===
- Sisu
- Hurja

=== Isku-class motor torpedo boats ===
- Isku

=== Syöksy-class motor torpedo boats ===
- Syöksy
- Nuoli
- Vinha
- Raju

=== 'V class' motor torpedo boats ===
- Vasama
- Vihuri
- Viima
- V3

=== Dark-class fast patrol boat ===
- Vasama I
- Vasama II

=== Patrol boat ===
- Turja

=== Hurja-class motor torpedo boats ===
- Hyöky
- Hirmu
- Hurja
- Hyrsky
- Häijy

=== Jymy-class motor torpedo boats ===
- Jylhä
- Jyry
- Jyske
- Jymy

=== Taisto-class motor torpedo boats ===
- Tarmo
- Taisto
- Tyrsky
- Tuima
- Tuisku
- Tuuli
- Taisto 7
- Taisto 8

=== R-class patrol boats ===
- Rymättylä
- Rihtniemi
- Ruissalo
- Raisio
- Röyttä

=== Motor patrol boats ===
- VMV 1
- VMV 2
- VMV 3
- VMV 4
- VMV 5
- VMV 6
- VMV 7
- VMV 8
- VMV 9
- VMV 10
- VMV 11
- VMV 12
- VMV 13
- VMV 14
- VMV 15
- VMV 16
- VMV 17
- VMV 18
- VMV 19
- VMV 20
- VMV 101
- VMV 102
- VMV 103
- VMV 104

=== Nuoli-class fast gunboats ===
- Nuoli 1
- Nuoli 2
- Nuoli 3
- Nuoli 4
- Nuoli 5
- Nuoli 6
- Nuoli 7
- Nuoli 8
- Nuoli 9
- Nuoli 10
- Nuoli 11
- Nuoli 12
- Nuoli 13

=== Hovercraft ===
- Tuuli

== School ships ==
- Suomen Joutsen
- Matti Kurki

== Connection vessels ==
- Augustin Ehrensvärd
- Axel von Fersen
- Fabian Wrede
- Wilhelm Carpelan
- Ahvola

== Surveillance ships ==
- Kustaanmiekka (99) (ex-Valvoja III)

== Transport ==
=== Hauki-class transports ===
- Hauki (232)
- Hankoniemi (334)

=== Kampela-class transports ===
- Kampela 1 (771)
- Kampela 2 (772)
- Kampela 3 (877)

=== Kala-class transports ===
- Kala 1
- Kala 2
- Kala 3
- Kala 4 (874)
- Kala 5
- Kala 6 (176)

=== Kave-class landing craft ===
- Kave 1
- Kave 2
- Kave 3
- Kave 4
- Kave 5
- Kave 6

=== Lohi-class transports ===
- Lohi (351)

=== Valas-class transports ===
- Valas (897)
- Vahakari (121)
- Vaarlahti
- Vänö
- Mursu (98)

== Training ships ==
=== Heikki-class training ships ===
- H3 (683)

=== Lokki-class training ships ===
- Lokki (57)

== Command launches ==
=== Askeri-class command launch ===
- Viiri

=== Träskö-class command launch ===
- Alskär (993)
- Torsö (894)

== See also ==
- List of current ships of the Finnish Navy
- Finnish Navy
