= Operation Tanne Ost =

German operation during World War II

- Part of the Lapland War of World War II
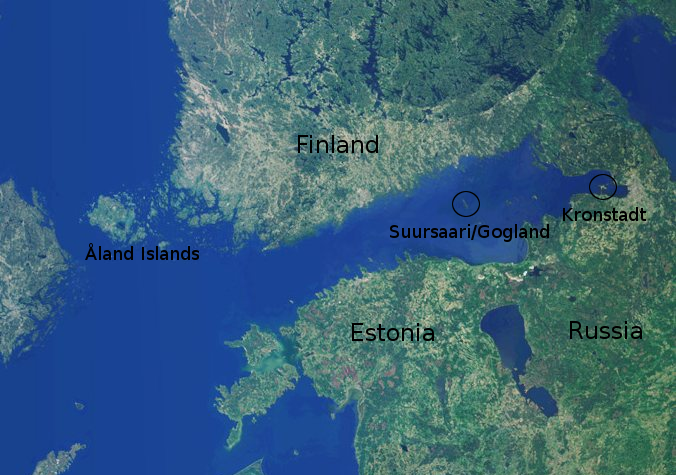
- Location of Åland, Suursaari, and Kronstadt.
Date	15 September 1944
Location	Suursaari (Gogland), Gulf of Finland
Result	Finnish victory

Belligerents
Germany	Finland; Air support: Soviet Union

Commanders and leaders
Karl-Conrad Mecke	Martti Miettinen

Strength
(Nazi Germany) 2,700	(Finland) 1,612 (Soviet Union) 10 Ilyushin Il-2 (Soviet Union) 3 Tupolev SB

Casualties and losses
153 KIA; 1,231 POWs; 3 landing crafts (F-822, F-866 & F-173); 3 patrol boats (B-1, B-31 & B-35); 1 minesweeper (R-29); 1 tugboat (Pernau) 2 Halftrucks, 1 light armoured car and a few trucks	(Finland) 36 KIA; 67 WIA; 8 MIA; 2 patrol boats (VMV 10 & VMV 14) (Soviet Union) 2 Il-2 and 1 SB

Operation Tanne Ost ("Fir East") was a German operation during World War II to capture the island Suursaari (Swedish: Hogland; Russian: Гогланд, romanized: Gogland) in the Gulf of Finland before it could fall into Soviet hands. Suursaari was especially important because it worked as a lock in the Finnish Gulf guarding the minefields keeping the Soviet Baltic Fleet in Kronstadt.

== Background ==
Finnish preparations to separately conclude the war against the Soviet Union prompted Germans to prepare for such an eventuality. Furthermore, as the situation became critical in mid-June 1944 during the initial successes of the Soviet Vyborg-Petrozavodsk Operation Germans placed the forces prepared for the operation into full readiness. German plans for both of the Tanne operations were planned alongside the Operation Birke, the German 20th Mountain Army's evacuation and on 5 July 1944, the Tanne operations were assigned solely to the Kriegsmarine.

On 2 September 1944, Finland officially informed Germany of the coming cease-fire between Finland and the Soviet Union, which led to Hitler's orders to confiscate all Finnish shipping and to prepare for Operation Tanne Ost. While the confiscation order was rescinded in order to facilitate the material transport related to Operation Birke, as Finnish authorities had prevented any ships from sailing from Finland to Germany, plans for capturing Gogland were kept in motion. The operation was initially planned with another operation to capture Åland (Tanne West), which was not carried out both because the units reserved for the operation were already deployed to the Eastern Front and because Sweden had warned against operations in Åland.

== Battle ==
On 14 September 1944 a first wave of 1,400 men from both the Wehrmacht and the Kriegsmarine were loaded on ships in Tallinn. Before the assault the German commander tried to negotiate with the Finnish commander on Suursaari, as he had been led to believe from intelligence reports that the Finns might leave without resistance. At midnight, when a pair of Finnish VMV-class patrol boats were preparing to leave to transport a stranded German radio unit, a German minesweeper arrived at the docks on the eastern side of the island and demanded that the island surrender. When the demand was refused the Germans started to land troops which led to Finnish forces opening fire at 00:55 on 15 September 1944. German landing craft arrived at the docks forcing Finnish security force at the location to withdraw but not before torching the two trapped Finnish patrol boats (VMV 10 and VMV 14).

German forces made further landings at the northern part of the island as well as at a beach south from the docks on the eastern side of the island. Finnish troops were able to contain the landings and even prevent further landing attempts on the island's western side. Finnish Navy reacted by dispatching several motor torpedo boats (Taisto class motor torpedo boats T-3, T-5, T-6 and G-5 class motor torpedo boats V-2 and V-3) to Gogland which started their attacks against German ships supporting the landing effort at 0330. While several explosions were witnessed from the initial attacks made under cover of darkness the later attacks made at dawn provided no further results. Several German vessels were struck with torpedo hits, but only the motor minesweeper R-29 sank, since the old torpedoes used by the Finns did not have enough yield to sink the larger minesweepers.

Finnish efforts forced German naval forces to start moving to the more protected western side of the island leaving the landing forces without effective artillery support. While the operation was underway 36 Soviet aircraft attacked the German forces destroying at least a landing craft. This made the Germans withhold the deployment of the force of three destroyers and two large torpedo boats which were being kept at readiness. Instead, German naval forces started a gradual withdrawal to Tallinn, leaving several landing craft and barges on the island when no contact with the landing force could be made. This prevented further waves of troops from landing. The operation ended in a complete failure, with the Finns capturing 1,231 German prisoners (of which 175 were wounded) in addition to 153 Germans killed in action with Finns losing 36 KIA, 67 WIA and 8 MIA.

== Consequences ==
This operation marked the beginning of hostilities between German and Finnish troops, known as the Lapland War. The Finns benefitted from the operation since it showed the Soviets that the Finns were prepared to use force against the Germans. It further damaged the German efforts in northern Finland since Finns ordered all shipping, including that leased to Germans, immediately to sail for Finnish or Swedish ports.

== Finnish order of battle ==
Finnish forces consisted of Coastal Artillery Regiment 12 (RTR 12). Defence was organized into four sections as follows.

Northern section, 1st Battalion (strength 340 men)

- 10th Coastal Defence Company
- 1st Section/201st Light Artillery Battery
- 24th Heavy AA-Battery
- 5th Light Coastal AA-Battery
- 1st Platoon/Heavy mortar Company

Mountain section, 2nd Battalion (strength 475 men)

- HQ-Company/Coastal Artillery Regiment 12
- Section/9th Motorised Heavy Artillery Battery
- 2nd Platoon/Heavy Mortar Company
- 1st Platoon/1st Coastal Engineer Company
- 8th Coastal Defence Company

Middle section, Coastal Infantry Battalion 7 (strength 295 men)

- 7th Coastal Defence Company
- 9th Coastal Defence Company
- 34th Heavy AA-Battery
- Training Company

Southern section, 3rd Battalion (strength 418 men)

- 2nd Company/Coastal Battalion 7
- 3rd Company/Coastal Battalion 7
- 3rd Platoon/Heavy Mortar Company
- 2nd Section/201st Light Artillery Battery

== Bibliography ==
- Jatkosodan historia 6: Meri- ja ilmapuolustus, hallinto ja sotatalous, huolto ja aselajit, kotijoukot [History of the Continuation War 6: Maritime and Air Defense, Administration and Southwest, Maintenance and Association, Home Force]. Werner Söderström osakeyhtiö. 1994. pp. 114–119. ISBN 951-0-15332-X.
- Kijanen, Kalervo (1968). Suomen Laivasto 1918–1968 [Finnish Fleet 1918–1968]. Vol. II. Helsinki: Meriupseeriyhdistys/Otava. OCLC 57961306.
- Lunde, Henrik O. (2011). Finland's War of Choice: The Troubled German-Finnish Alliance in World War II. Newbury: Casemate. ISBN 978-1-61200-037-4.
