= Finnish motor torpedo boat Hurja =

The name Hurja ("Wild") have been used for several vessels of the Finnish Navy:

- Hurja was the second ship of the Sisu-class motor torpedo boats, delivered in 1922.
- Hurja was the lead ship of the Hurja-class motor torpedo boats, delivered in 1943.
