= SM-class minesweeper =

Class overview
- Name: SM
- Builders: Aug. Eklöf AB, Turku, Finland
- Operators: Finnish Navy
- Preceded by: Ahven-class
- Succeeded by: Kuha-class
- Built: 1939-1940
- In commission: 1939-1954
- Completed: 4
- Lost: 1
- Retired: 3

General characteristics
- Type: Minesweeper
- Displacement: 20 tons
- Length: 18.0 m
- Beam: 3.8 m
- Draught: 1.7 m
- Propulsion: 80 hp (60 kW)
- Speed: 9 knots (17 km/h)
- Armament: 1× 20 mm Madsen AA
- Notes: Ships in class include: SM-1, SM-2, SM-3, SM-4

SM boats were initially designed as training boats for the naval Civil Guard. They were however completed just for the Winter War and were commissioned into Finnish Navy as minesweepers. SM-3 was lost on 5 October 1944 when it run into a mine and was destroyed taking five men with her. Because the ceasefire and peace treaties forbid the Civil Guard from Finland the SM boats stayed in the Navy even after the war.SM-1 and SM-4 were decommissioned 1951 and SM-2 on 1954.
