= Finnish hovercraft Tuuli =

Type of vessel in the Finnish Navy

- Scale model of FNS Tuuli

History
- Name: Tuuli
- Owner: Finnish Navy
- Ordered: 9 July 1999
- Builder: Aker Finnyards, Rauma, Finland
- Completed: 10 June 2002
- Commissioned: Never entered active service
- Stricken: 19 December 2003
- Homeport: Upinniemi
- Fate: Broken up in 2013

General characteristics
- Type: Hovercraft
- Displacement: 84 tons
- Length: 27.4 m (90 ft)
- Beam: 15.4 m (51 ft)
- Draught: -
- Installed power: 2 × Vericor TF40 gas turbines (6,000 kW)
- Propulsion: Two air propellers
- Speed: 50 knots (93 km/h; 58 mph)
- Complement: 10
- Sensors & processing systems: EADS ANCS 2000 combat data system; SAGEM EOMS
- Armament: (Note: These are possible combinations. All systems have been transferred to the Hamina class); Denel Umkhonto-IR VLS SAM system; Saab AB RBS-15 Mk3 SSM; torpedoes or mines (Sea Mine 2000)

Tuuli was a hovercraft built for the Finnish Navy. Originally intended to be the lead vessel of a class of four combat hovercraft, she was never officially commissioned and after having been laid up for the most of her career, she was broken up in 2013.

== Development ==
Tuuli was built at the Aker Finnyards Rauma shipyard in Rauma, Finland. Named after a decommissioned Tuima-class (modified Soviet OSA-II) missile boat, she was intended to be the lead vessel of a class of four combat hovercraft that would form part of Squadron 2000 (Finnish: Laivue 2000), a vessel procurement program of the Finnish Navy. Before naming, the hovercraft were referred to as the T-2000 class.

The hovercraft were intended to be used as mobile missile platforms that would be able to navigate and perform surprise attacks in the fractured Finnish archipelago. It was an attack vessel, not a landing craft or transport. Since the seas around Finland usually freeze over in the winter, parts of the archipelago cannot be navigated by conventional surface combatants and are accessible only by air or with a hovercraft. The Finnish Border Guard operates patrol and search-and-rescue hovercraft in these water. However, the focus of the Finnish Navy was redefined as long-term protection of merchant marine traffic, and Hamina-class missile boats with better operational-endurance were selected in Tuuli's stead. As a result, only the prototype vessel was built and never officially commissioned.

Tuuli was completed in 2002. Her trial runs proved a success and her specified capacity and maximum speed were exceeded. On 19 December 2003, it was announced that the Tuuli class would not enter active service and the prototype vessel would be presented for sale. There was foreign interest towards purchasing Tuuli, but no further details have been given. Apparently, Tuuli ACV could have been used in the Arctic to support larger hulls. The vessel was stored at the Upinniemi base.

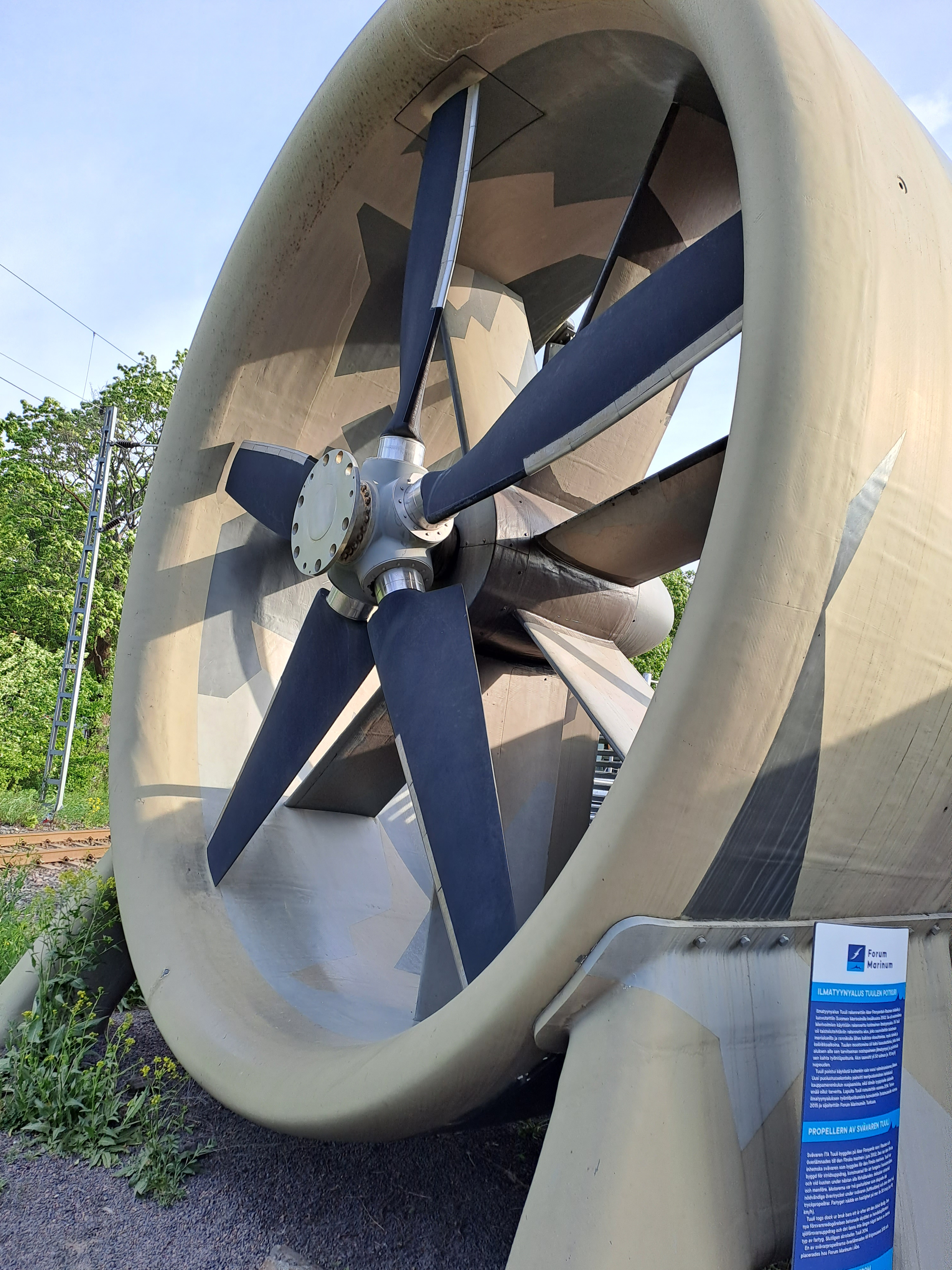
One of Tuuli's propellers near Forum Marinum, Turku

On 10 July 2013, it was announced that Tuuli would be scrapped as no suitable buyer has been found. She was broken up in October 2013.

== Design ==
The design of the vessel involved technology transferred from the United States. It was constructed from welded panels of thin marine aluminium sheets and extrusions connected with light-weight composite constructions. The special features of the vessel were good mobility, independence of waterways and fixed port equipment, year-around operation and a small crew of only ten owing to the advanced technology.

== See also ==
- Bora-class guided missile hovercraft
