= Syöksy-class motor torpedo boat =

Class overview
- Name: Finnish: Syöksy-luokka, lit. 'Syöksy class', a.k.a. Nuoli-luokka, 'Nuoli class'
- Builders: John I. Thornycroft & Company Ltd., Woolston, UK; Turun Veneveistämö, Turku, Finland; Borgå Mekaniska Verkstad, Porvoo, Finland
- Operators: Finnish Navy
- Preceded by: Isku class
- Succeeded by: Hurja class
- Built: 1928–1929
- In commission: 1928–1945
- Completed: 4
- Lost: 1
- Retired: 3

General characteristics
- Type: 55-foot coastal motor boats designed by Thornycroft
- Displacement: 13 t (13 long tons; 14 short tons) standard
- Length: 16.8 m (55 ft 1 in)
- Beam: 3.4 m (11 ft 2 in)
- Draft: 1.3 m (4 ft 4 in)
- Propulsion: 2 × 760-metric-horsepower (750 bhp) gas engines
- Speed: 40 knots (74 km/h; 46 mph)
- Crew: 7
- Armament: 2 × 450 mm (18 in) torpedoes; 1 × machine gun; 2 × depth charges; 3 × mines (instead of torpedoes); Raju & Vinha since 1942: 2 × 450 mm (18 in) torpedoes; 1 × 20 mm Madsen AA; 2 × depth charges; 3 × mines (instead of torpedoes)

The Syöksy-class motor torpedo boats (Finnish: syöksy, lit. 'lunge'), also known as Nuoli-class motor torpedo boats (Finnish: nuoli, lit. 'arrow'), were four motor torpedo boats operated by the Finnish Navy. The vessels were 55-foot coastal motor boats (CMBs) designed by Thornycroft, and were built at the Thornycroft shipyard in Woolston, UK in 1928 (MTV 4 and MTV 5), and later at the Turku shipyard in Turku (MTV 6) and the Borgå shipyard in Porvoo (MTV 7), Finland.

The vessels saw service in World War II. The 55-foot CMBs designed by Thornycroft were released their torpedoes by dropping them from rails in the aft. The boat then had to steer away from the torpedoes path, a manoeuvre that could be quite tricky in the close waters of the Gulf of Finland.

In 1942, the vessels received individual identification symbols on their superstructures. Nuoli had the ace of hearts, Vinha the ace of clubs, Syöksy the ace of diamonds, and Raju the ace of spades.

== Combat history ==
On July 6, 1941, Syöksy and Vinha sortied to intercept a convoy of three sailing ships headed for Hanko. In heavy seas the torpedoes did not function reliably and the boats could not hit their targets. Instead Syöksy dashed past the lead ship and dropped its depth charges in front of it which exploded and sank the sailing ship. Both Finnish motor torpedo boats escaped unharmed before escorting Soviet ships could respond. It was probably the motor schooner Laama, which was sunk near Tallinn on July 8, 1941, according to Soviet sources.

On the night of July 19–20, 1941, Finnish motor torpedo boats were patrolling off the coast of Estonia when a Soviet destroyer (a minesweeper, according to Soviet sources) opened fire on them. Vinha was damaged and unable to move but Finns were able to tow it to safety while Syöksy made repeated torpedo runs towards the destroyer drawing its fire and distracting it.

On September 1, 1941, Syöksy and Vinha were patrolling south of the Beryozovye Islands when they came across a pair of Soviet freighters. Syöksy torpedoed and sank the lead merchant (1,866 GRT SS Meero).

On September 22, 1941, Syöksy sank the Soviet minesweeper TShch-41 (ex–Sergei Kirov, an Izhorets-class tug commissioned into naval service) east of Gogland while it was patrolling near the island with Vinha.

On the night of October 1–2, 1941, Nuoli—together with Sisu—participated in an attack on Soviet naval ships off Gogland. According to some Finnish sources, it was a torpedo from Sisu that sank a Fugas-class minesweeper. According to other sources, Nuoli and Sisu allegedly sank two Soviet minesweepers as a result of this attack. In reality, according to Soviet sources, Nuoli and Sisu made an abortive attack on the Soviet submarine L-3 anchored in the bay of Gogland Island at the time.

Syöksy, Vinha, and Vihuri, as well as a minelaying KM-boat (German: Küstenminenleger, lit. 'Coastal Minelayer', or KM-Boot) participated in the attack on the harbour of Lavansaari on November 18, 1942. Syöksy managed to torpedo the Soviet gunboat Krasnoye Znamya (1,760 tonnes), which sank.

== Vessels of the class ==
Syöksy
Ex–MTV 4 in Finnish service. She was used as a torpedo boat until 1943, and then equipped with one 20 mm cannon and 3 mines.
Nuoli
Ex–MTV 5 in Finnish service. She was used as a torpedo boat until 1943, and then equipped with one 20 mm cannon and 3 mines.
Vinha
Ex–MTV 6 in Finnish service. She was used as a torpedo boat until 1943, and then equipped with one 20 mm cannon and 3 mines.
Raju
Ex–MTV 7 in Finnish service. She was destroyed on May 16, 1943, after having collided with a boom obstacle outside Koivisto.
