= Vihuri =

Vihuri may refer to:

- 1478 Vihuri, an asteroid
- Finnish motor torpedo boat Vihuri
- Ida Vihuri (1882–1929), Finnish politician
- Valmet Vihuri, a Finnish military aircraft
