= Finnish transport vessel Wilhelm Carpelan =

Von Fersen-class transport boat

Coordinates: 60.435833°N 22.235788°E

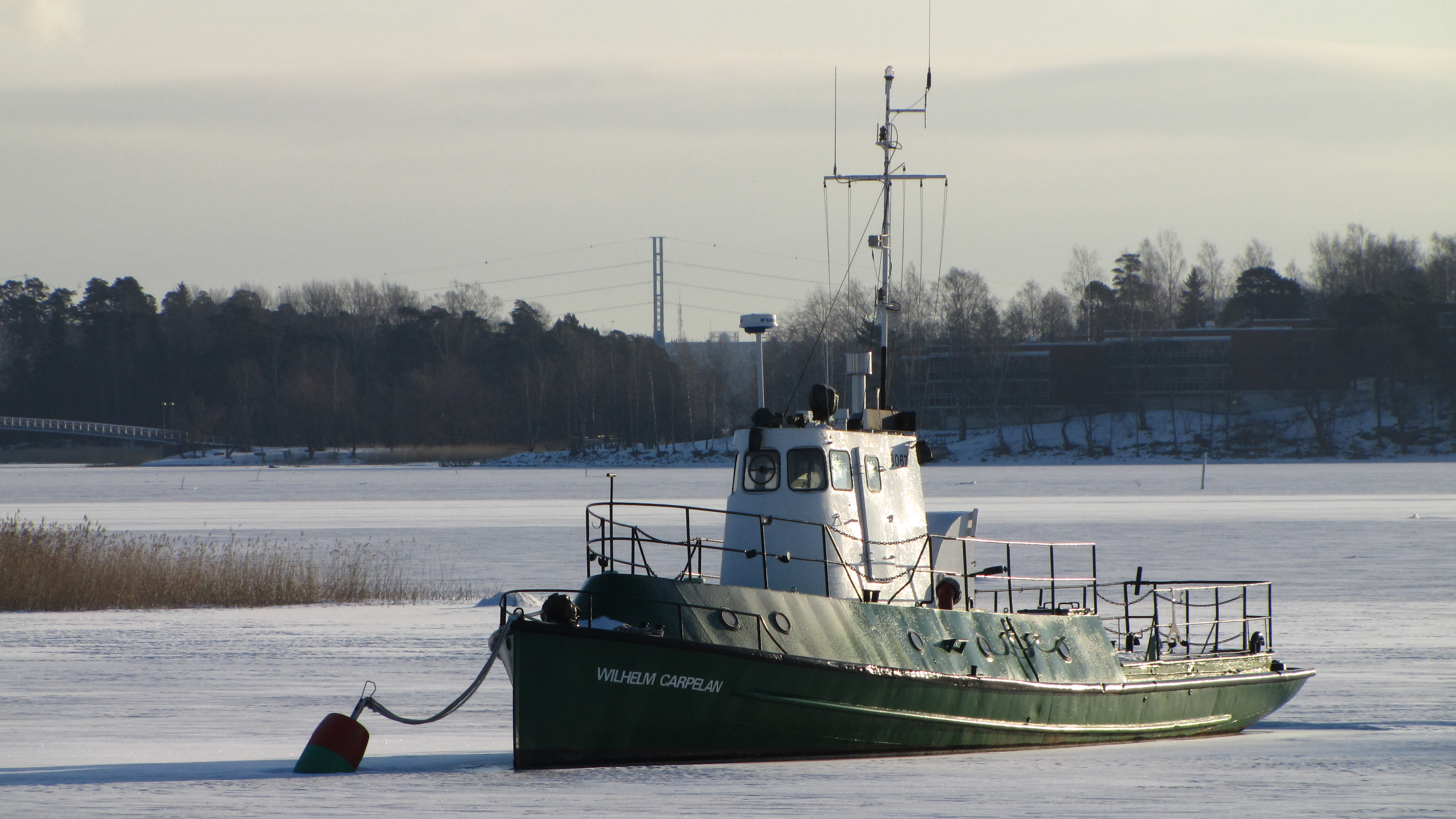
- Wilhelm Carpelan in Keilaniemi bay, Espoo, in February 2009

History

Finland
- Name: S1 Shrapnell (initially); Wilhelm Carpelan
- Namesake: Wilhelm Carpelan
- Owner: Finnish Navy
- Builder: Kone- ja Siltarakennus Oy (Helsinki, Finland)
- Commissioned: 1915
- Decommissioned: 1977
- Fate: Sold to private owner

Finland
- Name: Wilhelm Carpelan
- Owner: Private owners (1977–2013); Forum Marinum (2013–present)
- Status: Museum ship

General characteristics (as transport boat)
- Class & type: Von Fersen class transport boat
- Displacement: 20 tons
- Length: 18.5 m (60 ft 8 in)
- Beam: 4.2 m (13 ft 9 in)
- Draft: 1.5 m (4 ft 11 in)
- Installed power: 80 hp, later 180 hp
- Speed: 10, later 12 knots (19–22 km/h; 12–14 mph)
- Capacity: 40–50 men; 4–5 tons of cargo
- Complement: 2+2
- Armament: One machine gun

Wilhelm Carpelan is a former Von Fersen-class transport boat. Built in 1915 for the Imperial Russian Navy, she was used as a transport boat and later a minesweeper by the Finnish Navy until 1977. After decommissioning, she was sold to private ownership and used as a pleasure boat. In 2013, Wilhelm Carpelan was donated to the collections of Forum Marinum, the maritime museum in Turku, Finland.

== Description ==
As a transport boat, Wilhelm Carpelan had a length of 18.5 metres (60 ft 8 in), beam of 4.2 metres (13 ft 9 in), draft of 1.5 metres (4 ft 11 in), and displacement of about 20 tons. (Note: The main dimensions given in Rannikon Puolustaja 2/2004 are slightly different: length 18.3 metres, beam 3.9 metres, and draft of 1.8 metres.) Initially equipped with an 80 hp (60 kW) petrol engine that gave her a speed of about 10 knots (19 km/h; 12 mph), she was later fitted with a more powerful 180 hp (130 kW) engine that increased her speed to about 12 knots (22 km/h; 14 mph).

The vessel, crewed by two non-commissioned officers and two seamen, could carry about 4–5 tons of cargo or 40–50 passengers in the small cabin and open aftdeck. Later her aftship was covered and she was fitted with an enclosed pilothouse. She was armed with one machine gun.

== History ==
=== Finnish Navy ===
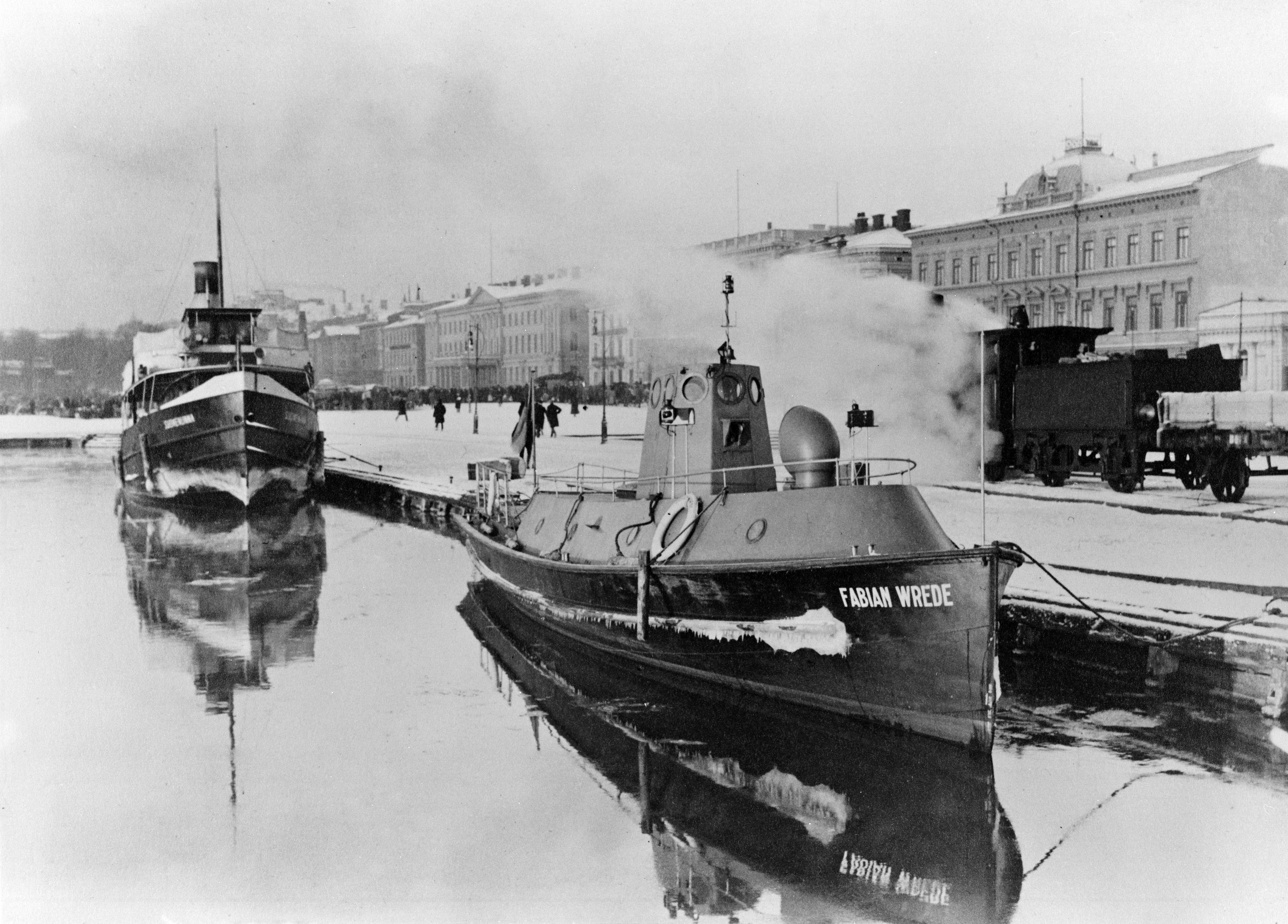
Sister ship Fabian Wrede in the 1920s

Wilhelm Carpelan was one of the four transport boats built by Kone- ja Siltarakennus Oy in Helsinki in 1915 for the Imperial Russian Navy. Initially built under the name S1 Shrapnell, she was seized by the newly founded Finnish Navy and renamed after Wilhelm Carpelan. The other boats of the class were Augustin Ehrensvärd, Axel von Fersen, and Fabian Wrede. The Von Fersen-class transport boats were sometimes referred to as the Ehrensvärd class.

Wilhelm Carpelan served as a transport vessel in the Finnish coastal artillery in the Helsinki region before the Second World War. After the war, the vessel was converted into a minesweeper operating in the Gulf of Finland. Afterwards, she was again used as a transport vessel in the coastal artillery. Over the years, the vessel was rebuilt a number of times, and when Wilhelm Carpelan was decommissioned and sold in 1977, there were barely any of the original steel plates left in her hull.

Piloting captains have praised the seaworthiness of the small vessels, although they have also been called "submarines" due to their shape and their tendency to have waves crashing over their decks. Passengers were also said to appreciate the stability and safe travel of the vessels.

=== Civilian ownership ===
On 11 November 1977, Wilhelm Carpelan was sold in Turku to Vilho Suominen, who restored the vessel to its former condition. Since the vessel was sold without an engine, she was fitted with a Valmet 815D diesel engine producing 180 hp.

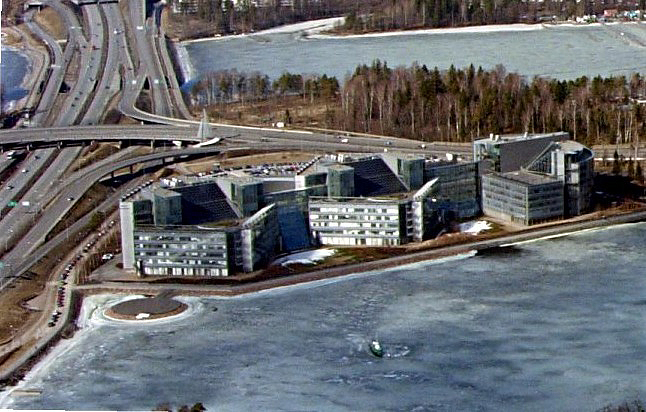
Nokia head office in Espoo, Finland. Wilhelm Carpelan can be seen in the foreground.

Wilhelm Carpelan changed hands again on 30 April 1982, when she was purchased by animator Antti Peränne from Espoo. The interior of the vessel was then rebuilt and the cabin walls were panelled with palisander acquired from the Swedish steamship Achilleus that was being broken up in Hamina. She was also fitted with a hydraulic tilting mast in order to fit under the bridges of Länsiväylä. After rebuilding, she was registered as a pleasure boat and included in the classic ship registry of the Finnish National Board of Antiquities in 1995. Peränne took great care of his historic vessel, for which he received a grant of 7,000 euro from the Finnish National Board of Antiquities in 2011, until his death in 2012.

For several years, Wilhelm Carpelan was usually seen anchored in Keilalahti, Espoo, next to the Nokia head office. In the past, the employees of the office had jokingly referred to the vessel as a spy boat of the Swedish telecommunications company Ericsson. In an online interview, Stephen Elop, the CEO of Nokia, said that when he enquired about the green vessel moored year-round in front of the office, he was told that it was a "Motorola spy ship".

The vessel was donated to Forum Marinum, the maritime museum located by the Aura River in the city of Turku, in the spring of 2013.

== See also ==
- List of decommissioned ships of the Finnish Navy
