= Turunmaa-class gunboat =

Class of Finnish naval vessels

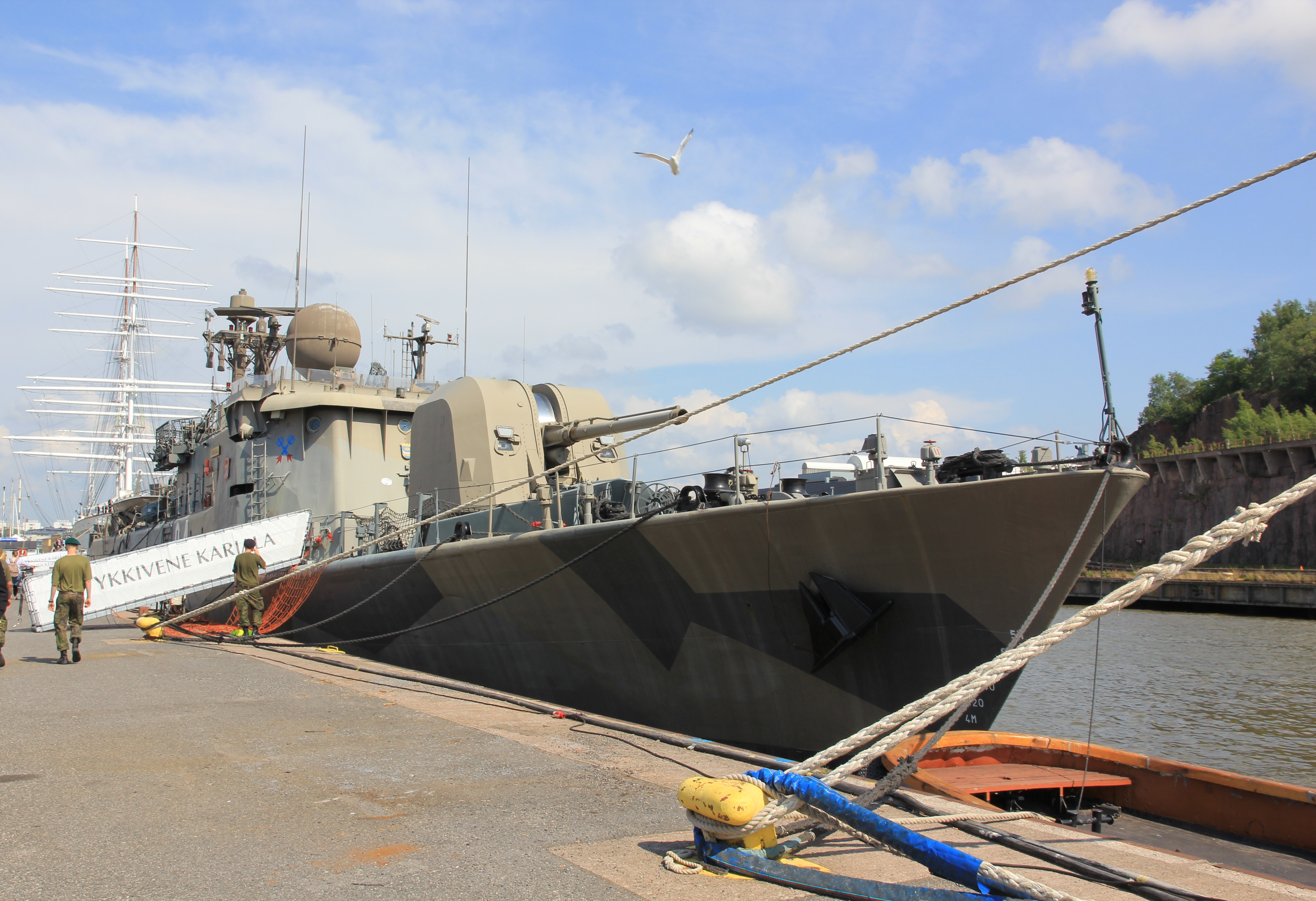
- Karjala alongside in Turku

Class overview
- Name: Turunmaa class
- Operators: Finnish Navy
- Built: 1963–1968
- In service: 1969–2002
- Completed: 2

General characteristics
- Type: Corvette
- Displacement: 700 tons (+100 with later modifications); 1,350 tons (full load)
- Length: 74 m (243 ft)
- Beam: 7.8 m (26 ft)
- Draught: 3 m (10 ft)
- Propulsion: 3 × MTU; 2,200 kW (3,000 hp). Each driving one propeller.; 1 × Rolls-Royce Olympus TM1a gas turbine; 16,000 kW (21,000 hp), driving pump-jet
- Speed: 17 knots (31 km/h; 20 mph) (diesel cruising); 37 knots (69 km/h; 43 mph) (gas-turbine)
- Range: 5,000 nmi (9,300 km; 5,800 mi)
- Complement: 70 (30 officers, 40 enlisted)
- Sensors & processing systems: Simrad hull-mounted sonar; WM22 missile control; Argo intercept EW
- Armament: 1 × Bofors 120 mm Automatic Gun L/46; 2 × Bofors 40 mm Automatic Gun L/70; 2 × twin ZU-23-2 (modified naval version); 2 × RBU-1200 anti-submarine rocket launchers; 2 × depth charge racks; Mine-laying capability

The Turunmaa-class fast gunboats (Finnish: Turunmaa-luokan tykkivene) was a type of vessel, previously operated by the Finnish Navy in the anti-submarine warfare (ASW) and trade protection roles. Internationally they were labeled as corvettes.

== History ==
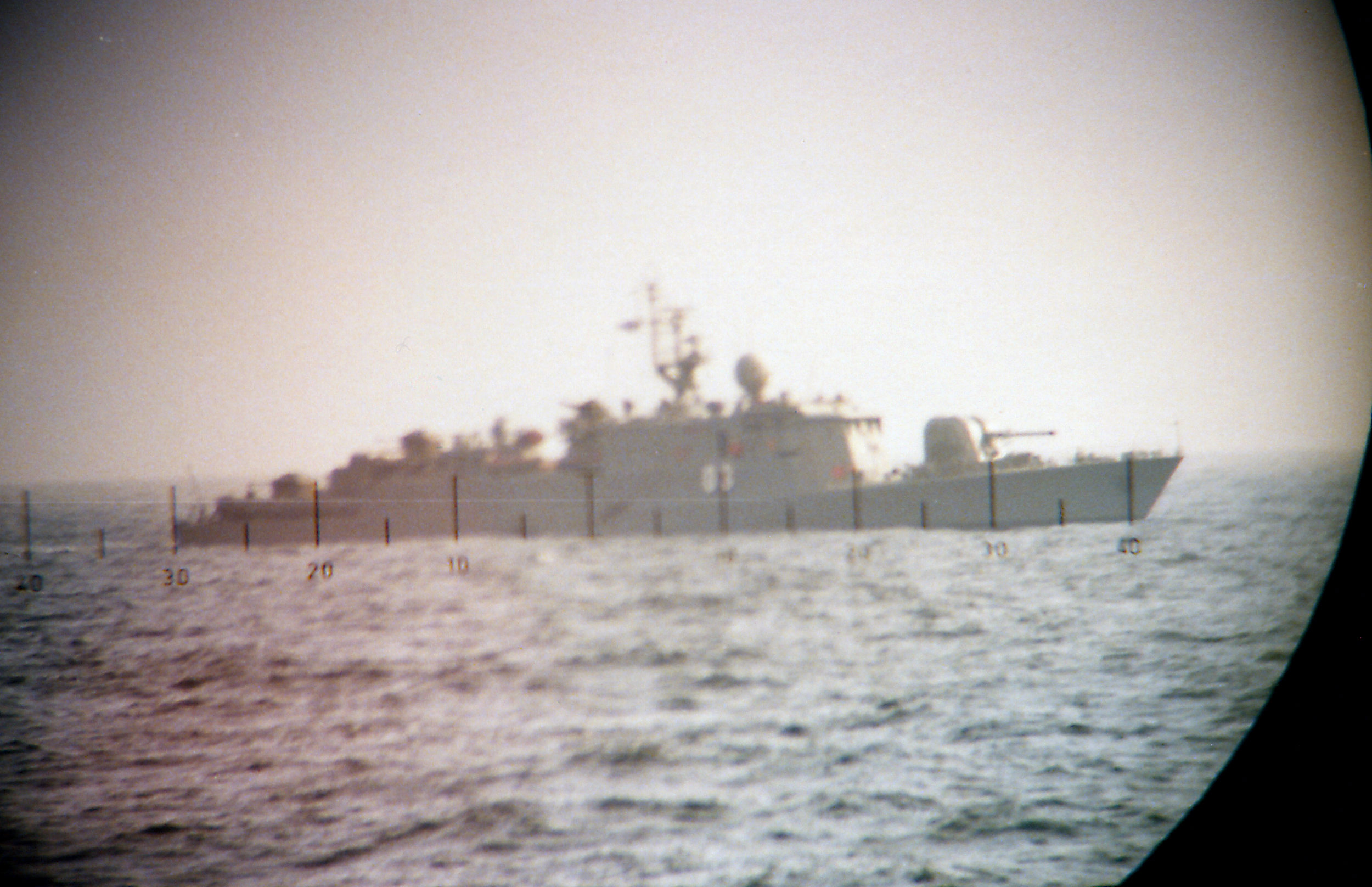
Turunmaa photographed through range finding binoculars in 1983

Development of the class started in 1963. Five hull designs and over thirty propulsion variants were looked at during development. At the time, the electronics of the vessels, and the propulsion system were state of the art and attracted international attention. Both vessels were built by Wärtsilä's Hietalahti shipyard in Helsinki.

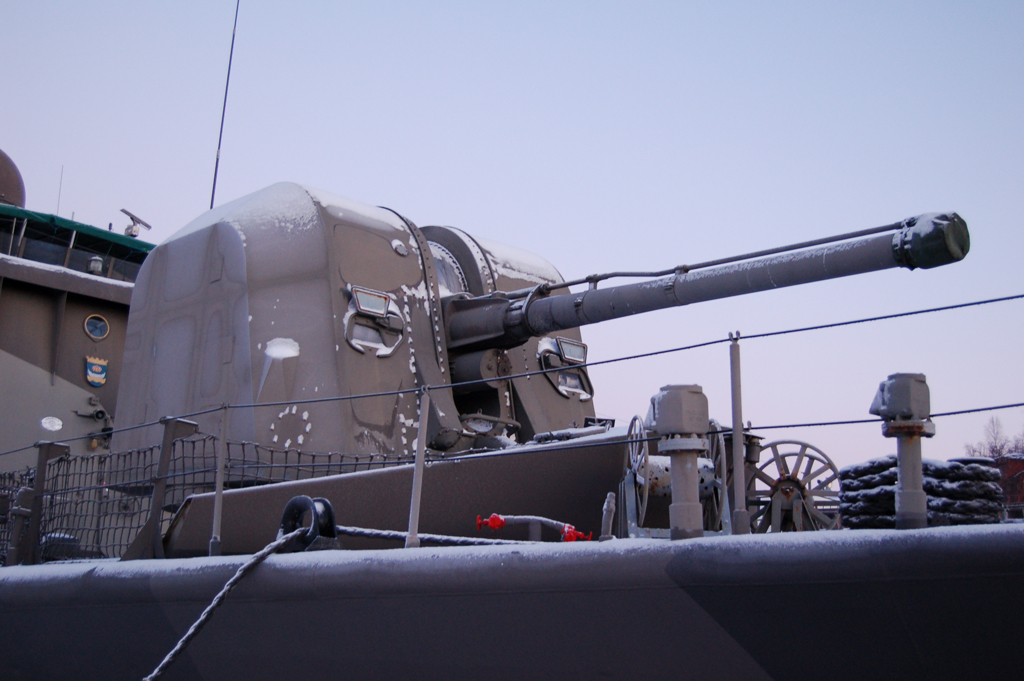
Karjala's 120mm main gun

In 1985–86 both ships were refitted, and the entire fire-control and communications systems were updated. Karjala has been berthed since 2002 at the maritime museum Forum Marinum in Turku as a museum ship next to Suomen Joutsen. Turunmaa was stripped of armaments and served as a floating machine shop and training ship for Satakunta Polytechnic. Currently Turunmaa is being refitted for civilian use. Neither vessel is currently owned by the Finnish Navy.

The ships were ordered in 1963, launched in 1968, commissioned in 1969 and decommissioned in 2002. The lead vessel was named after the turuma frigates serving in the Archipelago Fleet in the 18th and 19th centuries.

== Vessels of the class ==
- Turunmaa (03)
- Karjala (04)
