= VMV-class patrol boat =

Finnish Coast Guard patrol boat

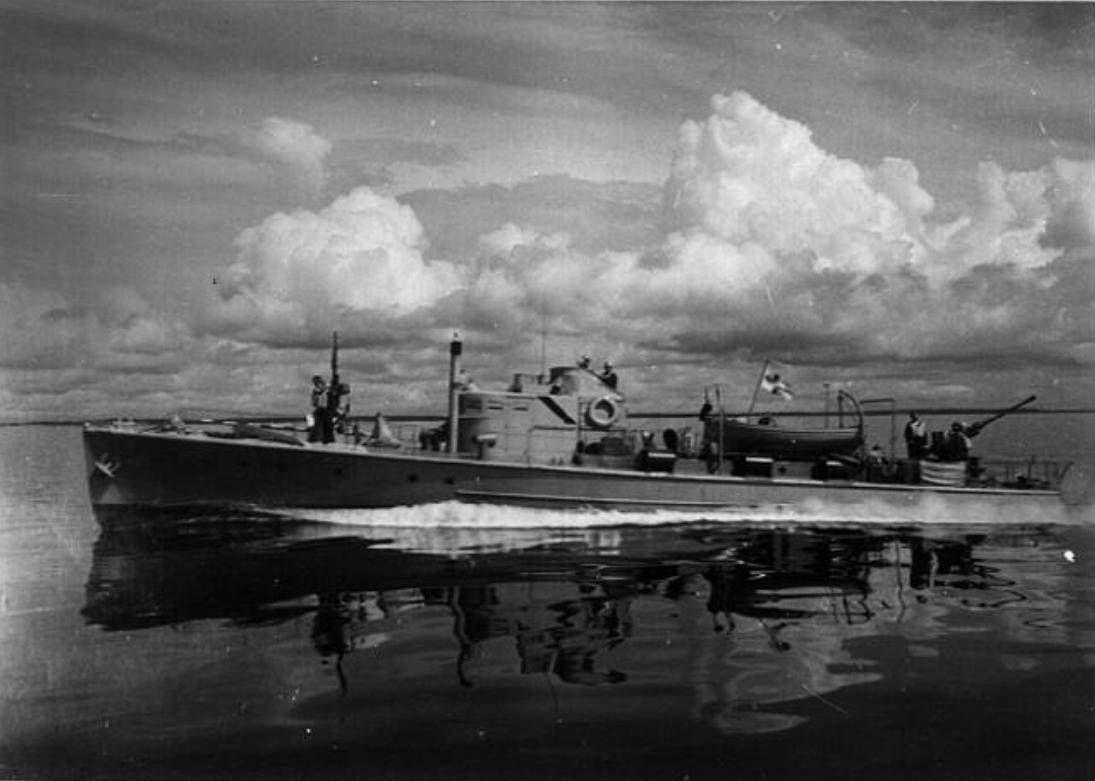

Class overview
- Name: VMV
- Operators: Finnish Navy
- Built: 1929–1935
- In commission: 1931–1960
- Completed: 20
- Lost: 7
- Retired: 12
- Preserved: 1

General characteristics
- Type: Patrol boat
- Length: 25 m (82 ft)
- Beam: 4.10 m (13.5 ft)
- Draught: 1 m (3 ft 3 in)
- Propulsion: 2 × Maybach V-12, 1,220 hp (910 kW)
- Speed: 25 knots (46 km/h; 29 mph)
- Armament: 1 × 40 mm gun; 1 × 20 mm gun; Depth charges (optional); 2 × 450 mm torpedoes (optional); 4–5 naval mines (optional); machine guns (optional)
- Notes: Ships in class include: VMV 1 – VMV 20

VMV-class patrol boat (Finnish: Vartiomoottorivene) was a series of Finnish patrol boats, which served with the Finnish Coast Guard and the Finnish Navy during World War II.

== Development ==
The VMV boats were designed by dipl.eng. Jaakko Rahola of the Finnish Navy. The design was good, giving the boats excellent seagoing qualities, fast speed and a light construction, and thanks to their wooden hull, resistance to magnetic mines. The boats only weighed about 30 tons, their length was between 20 and 25 metres (65 ft 7 in and 82 ft 0 in). The standard armament consisted of one 20 mm automatic cannon, although they could be armed with a wide variety of weapons depending on the requirements. The first boat was ordered in December 1929 from U. Suortin Veneveistämö in Helsinki. However, construction of this boat was delayed, and two boats that had been ordered from Germany were ready before the first Finnish one. The following two boats were ordered in January 1931 from Uudenkaupungin Veneveistämö and they were ready by December, the same year. Another order was then placed for one boat from Turun Veneveistämö and it was ready by 1932. A further ten boats were ordered in 1934 from Turun Veneveistämö. These were ready by 1935.

VMV-1–VMV-7 were equipped with gasoline engines, and VMV-8–VMV-17 had diesel engines. VMV-3 and VMV-7 were destroyed before the war, the former due to an engine fire in 1931, and the latter due to an explosion in 1933.

The only remaining VMV boat, VMV-11, is today preserved at the Kotka Maritime Museum in its original configuration of the 1930s.

== Operational service ==
At the outbreak of the Winter War, the VMV boat armament was improved by fitting machine guns, depth charges and smoke dischargers. During the Continuation War, the extra armament varied depending on the mission; for example, they could be fitted with four or five naval mines or two 450 mm (18 in) torpedoes. Some VMV boats were also used as gunboats, and were fitted with a 40 mm Bofors gun and multiple 20 mm guns. Some were used as submarine hunters, and were equipped with a 20 mm gun and depth charges. Limited to patrol coastal waters, the VMV boats did not participate in any major action during the Winter War. During the Continuation War, their primary tasks were anti-submarine warfare and escort duty, although several boats participated in battles for control of islands on the Gulf of Finland.

Five VMV boats were lost during the war, all in 1944. Two were sunk during air raids in Helsinki, one was lost to Soviet aircraft near Koivisto and two were lost when the Germans attacked Hogland during the Lapland War.

== Vessels of the class ==
Ship	Launched	Location	Speed	Fate
VMV-1	1930	Germany	25 knots	Decommissioned 1950
VMV-2	1930	Germany	25 knots	Decommissioned 1950
VMV-3	1930	Helsinki, Finland	23 knots	Lost (burned) 1931
VMV-4; Former: Sterling	1916	Norway	16 knots	Retired 1939
VMV-5	1931	Uusikaupunki, Finland	23 knots	Decommissioned 1959
VMV-6	1931	Uusikaupunki, Finland	23 knots	Decommissioned 1960
VMV-7	1932	Turku, Finland	23 knots	Lost (burned and sunk) 1933
VMV-8	1935	Turku, Finland	23 knots	Lost (sunk) 1944
VMV-9	1935	Turku, Finland	23 knots	Decommissioned 1960
VMV-10	1935	Turku, Finland	23 knots	Lost (sunk) 1944
VMV-11	1935	Turku, Finland	23 knots	Preserved
VMV-12	1935	Turku, Finland	23 knots	Lost (sunk) 1944
VMV-13	1935	Turku, Finland	23 knots	Decommissioned 1971
VMV-14	1935	Turku, Finland	23 knots	Lost (sunk) 1944
VMV-15	1935	Turku, Finland	23 knots	Decommissioned 1964
VMV-16	1935	Turku, Finland	23 knots	Decommissioned 1965
VMV-17	1935	Turku, Finland	23 knots	Lost (sunk) 1944
VMV-18; Former: SP-1	1935	Porvoo, Finland	11 knots	Decommissioned 1958
VMV-19; Former: SP-41	1943	Tolkkinen, Finland	10 knots	Decommissioned 1970
VMV-20; Former: SP-42	1943	Tolkkinen, Finland	10 knots	Decommissioned 1970

VMV-1, VMV-2
The Finnish Navy ordered two boats from Abeking & Rasmussen in Bremen, Germany in January 1930, since the construction of the first boat, the future VMV-3, was delayed. These boats were ready by June 1930 and were taken into service in 1931. They had a length of 25.00 m (82 ft 0 in), beam 4.10 m (13 ft 5 in) and a draft of 1.00 metre (3 ft 3 in). They were equipped with two Maybach V-12 gasoline-powered engines, producing 1,220 horsepower (910 kW). The ships could reach speeds of up to 25 knots (46 km/h; 29 mph).

Both VMV-1 and VMV-2 distinguished themselves in the battle against alcohol smugglers in the 1930s. VMV-1 made the largest ever confiscation of smuggled alcohol in Finland at Åland. VMV 2 intercepted a large smuggler vessel, the schooner Omar in 1931. The large smuggler ship S/S Relly came to the other smuggler ship's rescue and tried to sink VMV 2 by ramming it, and a wild duel with small arms opened up. A few smugglers were wounded, but the wild boat ride was solved through the good seamanship of the VMV crew, and when the VMV opened up fire with the 20 mm gun, the smugglers surrendered.

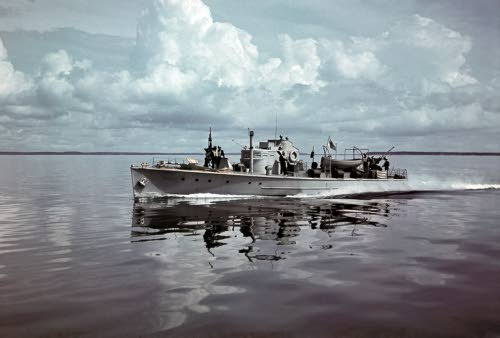
VMV 9

During the war VMV 1 served with the Varmistuslaivue, and VMV 2 was tasked with anti-submarinde warfare (1939–1941). In 1942, both vessels were part of the 1. Vartiomoottorivenelaivue. VMV 1 took part in the operation that led to the sinking of the Finnish coastal defence ship Ilmarinen. Facing the danger of explosion, she saved 57 men from the upside-down turned hull of Ilmarinen. She also participated in the battle of Bengtskär on 26 July 1941, together with VMV 2, VMV 13, and VMV 14. She was also part in the operation where the minelayer Riilahti sank. She saved 11 men from the water, among them the commander of Riilahti, Captain Lieutenant Osmo Kivilinna, who later died of his injuries. After the war both vessels participated in mine sweeping operations. Both vessels were scrapped in 1951, having served far longer than initially intended.

VMV 3
The first VMV order was partially placed at Ares motorverkstad (the engine) and partly from E. Suortin Veneveistämö in Helsinki (the hull) in December 1929 . The boat was ready by November 1930. The vessel was destroyed on the very first day of service, due to a fire in the engine compartments on 10 June 1931. The fire caused great damage to the ship and the boat had to be scrapped soon thereafter.

VMV 4
VMV 4 was originally a Norwegian-built smugglers boat, named Sterling. She was later confiscated by the Finnish authorities in 1931 and handed over to the Coast Guard. She was sold to a civilian buyer in 1939.

VMV 5, VMV 6
Two more boats were ordered from Uudenkaupungin Veneveistämö in Uusikaupunki in January 1931. These were practically identical to VMV 3, with only some minor differences. VMV 5 and VMV 6 were ready by December 1931. These boats had a higher superstructure Compared to the other VMV boats, and could be easily distinguished from the other VMV boats. VMV 5 belonged to the anti-submarine warfare flotilla during the Winter War, and both ships belonged to the 1st and 2nd escort flotillas during the Continuation War. VMV 5 and VMV 6 were scrapped in 1959–60.

VMV 7
The following boat was ordered from Turun Veneveistämö in April 1932. Externally it was identical to VMV 3 and the interior was similar to VMV 5. This boat was ready by 1932, however, an internal explosion destroyed the boat in 1933. This led to a redesign of the future VMV boats, and the subsequent vessels were given diesel engines.

VMV 8 – VMV 17
In 1934, the Finnish Navy announced a competition for ten VMV boats. Turun Veneveistämö won and was given the order in March 1934. These boats were 1 m longer and had a greater displacement than the previous boats. The boats were ready by 1935.
VMV 8 belonged to the escort Flotilla during the Winter War and to the 2nd Patrol Flotilla during the Continuation War. She was sunk at her moorings during a Soviet bombing raid on Helsinki on 26 February 1944.
VMV 9 belonged to the Escort Flotilla during the Winter War, to the Motor Torpedo Boat Flotilla in 1941 and to the 2nd Patrol Flotilla between 1942 and 1944.
VMV 10 belonged to the Escort Flotilla during the Winter War, to the Motor Torpedo Boat Flotilla in 1941 and to the 2nd Patrol Flotilla between 1942 and 1944. She was sunk by German gun fire on 15 September 1944, when the Germans tried to conquer the island of Hogland from the Finns during Operation Tanne Ost.
VMV 11 served between 1939 and 1941 in the Motor Torpedo Boat Flotilla and afterwards in the 2nd Patrol Flotilla. She is today preserved and restored to original appearance and at display at the Maritime Museum in Kotka.
VMV 12 belonged to the escort flotilla during the Winter War and to the 2nd Patrol Flotilla during the Continuation War. She was sunk at her moorings in Helsinki by Soviet bomber aircraft during a raid on 6 February 1944.
VMV 13 belonged to the escort flotilla during the Winter War and to the 1st and 2nd Patrol Flotillas during the Continuation War. She participated in the battle of Bengtskär, where she saved 13 men. Later on she sank the Soviet Shchuka-class submarine Щ-311, together with VMV 15, on 12 October 1942. In 1972 she was used as a water bus in Kalajoki, Keminjärvi and Kajaana. She was scrapped in the beginning of the 2000s.
VMV 14 served between 1939 and 1940 as a submarine hunter, and during the Continuation War in the Escort Flotilla, and the 1st and 2nd Patrol Flotillas. She was sunk by German gun fire in the Suurkylä harbour on the island of Hogland on 15 September 1944, when the Germans tried to conquer the island.
VMV 15 belonged to the Anti Submarine-warfare Flotilla during the Winter War and to the escort flotilla, and the 1st and 2nd Patrol Flotillas during the Continuation War. Together with VMV 13 she participated in the sinking of the Soviet submarine Щ-311, on 12 October 1942. She was damaged in an air raid west of the island of Koivisto on 18 June 1942.
VMV 16 belonged to the Anti Submarine-warfare Flotilla during the Winter War and to the escort flotilla, and the 1st and 2nd Patrol Flotillas during the Continuation War.
VMV 17 belonged to the Escort Flotilla during the Winter War and to the Motor Torpedo Boat Flotilla, and the 1st and 2nd Patrol Flotillas during the Continuation War. She was damaged by gun fire on 22 May 1943, while on patrol. Two men were killed and one wounded, however she managed to not sink two Soviet vessels MO207 and MO303. VMV 17 was sunk by Soviet aircraft on 6 February 1944 near the island of Koivisto. The ones that survived the war were successively scrapped during the following years, the last one in 1970.

VMV 18 – VMV 20
VMV 18, VMV 19 and VMV 20 were originally used for maritime training by the Finnish Civil Guards. The boats were handed over to the Coast Guard in 1944 when the Civil Guards had to be disbanded. The boats had a displacement of 21–22 tons and could reach speeds up to 10–11 knots (19–20 km/h; 12–13 mph). VMV 18 (ex-SP-1) had been constructed in Porvoo in 1935. VMV 19 (ex-SP-41) and VMV 20 (ex-SP-42) had been built in Tolkkinen in 1943. VMV 18 was scrapped in 1958.

== Wartime losses ==
Ship	Date	Location	Cause
VMV-8	26 February 1944	While moored to pier at Helsinki	Soviet bombing
VMV-10	14 September 1944	While moored to pier at Gogland	German naval gunfire
VMV-12	6 February 1944	While moored to pier at Helsinki	Soviet bombing
VMV-14	14 September 1944	While moored to pier at Gogland	German naval gunfire
VMV-17	18 June 1944	Near Beryozovye Islands	Soviet aircraft
