= Jymy-class motor torpedo boat =

WW II naval boat

Class overview
- Name: Jymy class
- Builders: Cantieri Baglietto, Genoa, Italy
- Operators: Regia Marina; Finnish Navy
- Completed: 4
- Retired: 4

General characteristics
- Type: Motor torpedo boat
- Displacement: 25 t (25 long tons)
- Length: 18.7 m (61 ft 4 in)
- Beam: 4.7 m (15 ft 5 in)
- Draught: 1.5 m (4 ft 11 in)
- Propulsion: 2 × Isotta-Fraschini petrol engines, 1,500 kW (2,000 bhp)
- Speed: 42 knots (78 km/h; 48 mph)
- Range: 1,100 nmi (2,000 km; 1,300 mi) at 6 kn (11 km/h; 6.9 mph)
- Complement: 10
- Armament: 1 × 20 mm (0.79 in) Breda gun; 1 × 12.7 mm (0.50 in) machine gun; 2 × 450 mm (18 in) torpedo tubes

The Jymy-class motor torpedo boats (English: "Rumble") or J class was an Italian-designed and built class of motor torpedo boats, seeing service during World War II with the Royal Italian Navy and later with the Finnish Navy. The four boats of the J class were built by Cantieri Baglietto in Genoa, Italy and purchased by the Finns on 5 June 1943. Following World War II, the vessels were rearmed according to the Paris Peace Treaty of 1947, losing their torpedo capabilities and given more guns. They were removed from service in 1961.

== Design and description ==
The J class were initially four motor torpedo boats of the Italian MAS 526 class. The MAS 526 class were a lengthened version of the preceding MAS 501 class with a displacement of 25 tonnes (25 long tons), measuring 18.7 metres (61 ft 4 in) long with a beam of 4.7 m (15 ft 5 in) and a draught of 1.5 m (4 ft 11 in). The motor torpedo boats were propelled by two propellers powered by two Isotta-Fraschini petrol engines creating 1,500 kilowatts (2,000 bhp). They had a maximum speed of 42 knots (78 km/h; 48 mph). The vessels carried 1.25 t (1.23 long tons; 1.38 short tons) of fuel giving them a range of 1,100 nautical miles (2,000 km; 1,300 mi) at 6 knots (11 km/h; 6.9 mph) or 360 nmi (670 km; 410 mi) at 42 knots. The J class were armed with two 450-millimetre (18 in) torpedo tubes, one 20 mm (0.79 in) Breda gun and one 12.7 mm (0.50 in) machine gun.

== Vessels of the class ==
Jymy class construction data
Number	Ship	Builder	Launched	Commissioned	Fate
J 1	Jylhä (ex-MAS 526)	Baglietto, Varazze	22 August 1938	2 March 1939	Acquired by Finland in 1943, stricken 1961.
J 2	Jyry (ex-MAS 527)	Baglietto, Varazze	30 January 1939	30 March 1939	Acquired by Finland in 1943, stricken 1961.
J 3	Jyske (ex-MAS 528)	Baglietto, Varazze	28 February 1939	29 August 1939	Acquired by Finland in 1943, stricken 1961.
J 4	Jymy (ex-MAS 529)	Baglietto, Varazze	3 April 1939	30 June 1939	Acquired by Finland in 1943, stricken 1961.

== Construction and career ==
All four vessels were constructed in Italy and served with the Royal Italian Navy during World War II. Finland acquired the four motor torpedo boats on 5 June 1943. The Paris Peace Treaty of 1947 was signed following the end of World War II, and Finland was prohibited by the treaty from having torpedo-carrying vessels. The ships were converted into motor gunboats in 1949, in accordance with the treaty. The vessels were rearmed with a 40 mm (1.6 in) gun in addition to the 20 mm gun. Their maximum speed was reduced to 35 knots (65 km/h; 40 mph) and their displacement decreased to 22 tonnes (22 long tons). The J-class vessels were stricken from the naval vessel register in 1961.
