= Tuima-class missile boat =

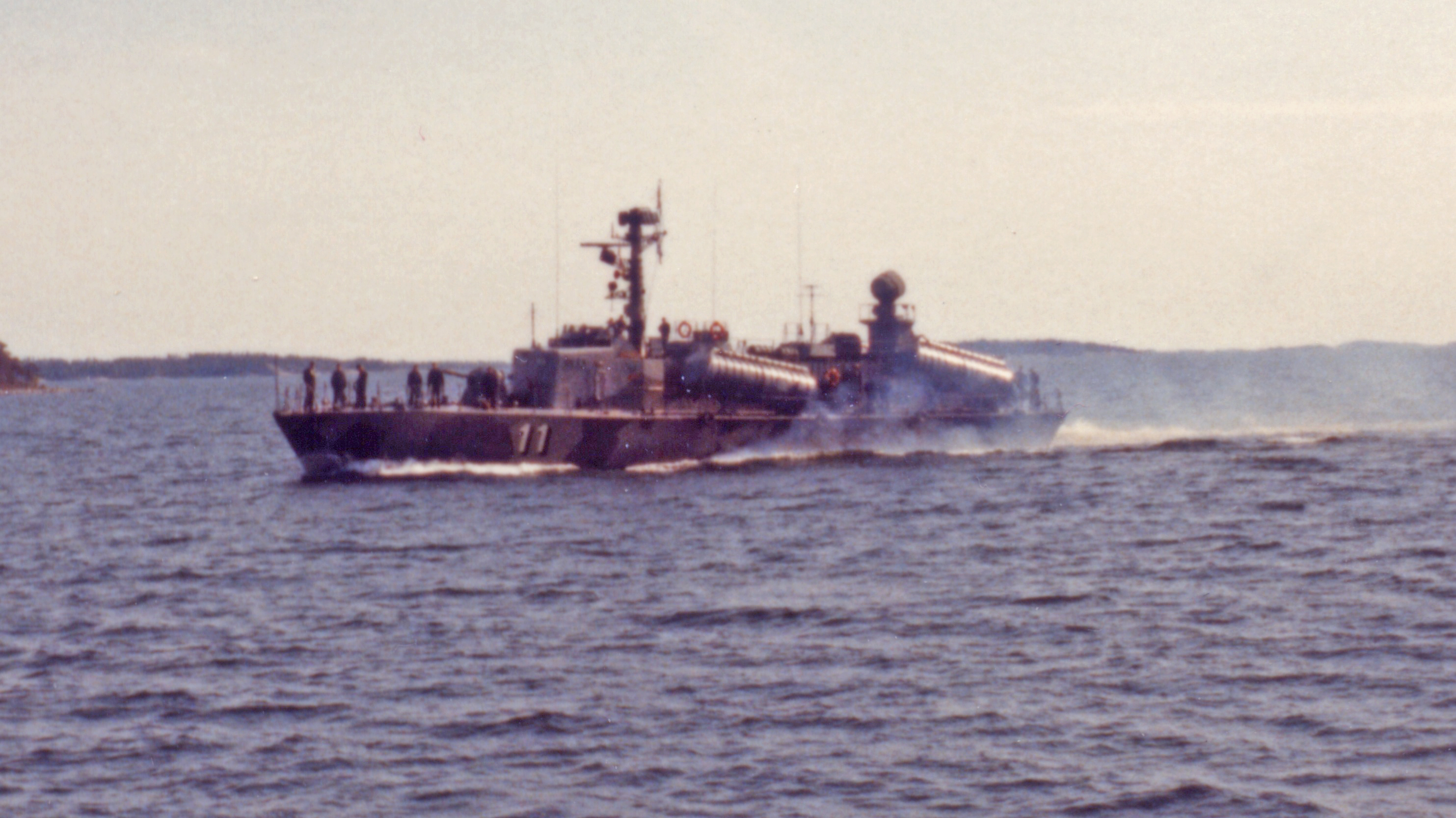
- Tuima in 1983

Class overview
- Name: Tuima-class missile boat
- Builders: Soviet Union
- Operators: Finnish Navy; Egyptian Navy
- Preceded by: Nuoli-class gunboats
- Succeeded by: Helsinki-class missile boats
- Completed: 4
- Retired: 4

General characteristics
- Type: Fast attack craft
- Displacement: 250 tons
- Length: 38.6 m (126 ft 8 in)
- Beam: 7.7 m (25 ft 3 in)
- Height: 12 m (39 ft 4 in)
- Draught: 3.1 m (10 ft 2 in)
- Propulsion: 3 × M504 B2 diesel engines, ordinary propeller propulsion; 11,190 kW (15,010 hp)
- Speed: ~33 knots (61 km/h; 38 mph) (Tuima & Tuuli); ~40 knots (74 km/h; 46 mph) (Tuisku & Tyrsky)
- Complement: 25
- Armament: 2 × double-barreled AK-230 30 mm/65 guns; 1 × 12.7 mm machine gun; 4 × SS-N-2A Styx; Mines (from 1994)

The Tuima-class missile boat was a class of fast attack craft used as missile boats by the Finnish Navy.

The vessels were constructed in the Soviet Union and purchased by the Finnish Navy between 1974 and 1975. The vessels were similar to the Soviet Project 205U Tsunami-class missile boats, given the NATO reporting name Osa II.

All of the vessels were later modified into fast minelayers at Aker Finnyards when their armament became obsolete. The modification work took place between 1993 and 1994 at the Uusikaupunki yards. Tuima and Tuuli had their missiles removed and the superstructure was modified. Mine rails and mine loading equipment were installed and the weapons guidance systems were modernized. Tuisku and Tyrsky were also modernized into fast minelayers, but less extensively, removing their missile weapons, and installing mine rails. The Tuima-class vessels belonged to the 5th Minewarfare Squadron based at Upinniemi.

The vessels of the class were decommissioned by 2000.

The Tuima class had three 56-cylinder radial diesel engines, each one producing 3,500 kilowatts (4,700 hp). The middle engine and propeller shaft of Tuima and Tuuli were removed during the modernization to make space for the mine laying equipment. This lowered the top-speed by 7 knots (13 km/h; 8.1 mph). The class was known amongst the Finnish Navy conscripts as "Tuska" (Agony) class or "Moskvich" after a Russian car brand of that name. They were not considered as pleasant places to serve because of their poor ergonomics.

After decommissioning, the vessels were moored at Loviisa, and it was planned that one was to be transferred to the new Maritime Museum in Kotka. However, in October 2006, the Finnish Ministry of Defence stated that all four were to be sold to Egypt where they were refitted and taken into active service.

== Vessels of the class ==
- Tuima (11)
- Tuuli (12)
- Tuisku (14)
- Tyrsky (15)
