= Kiisla-class patrol boat =

Finnish class of two patrol boats

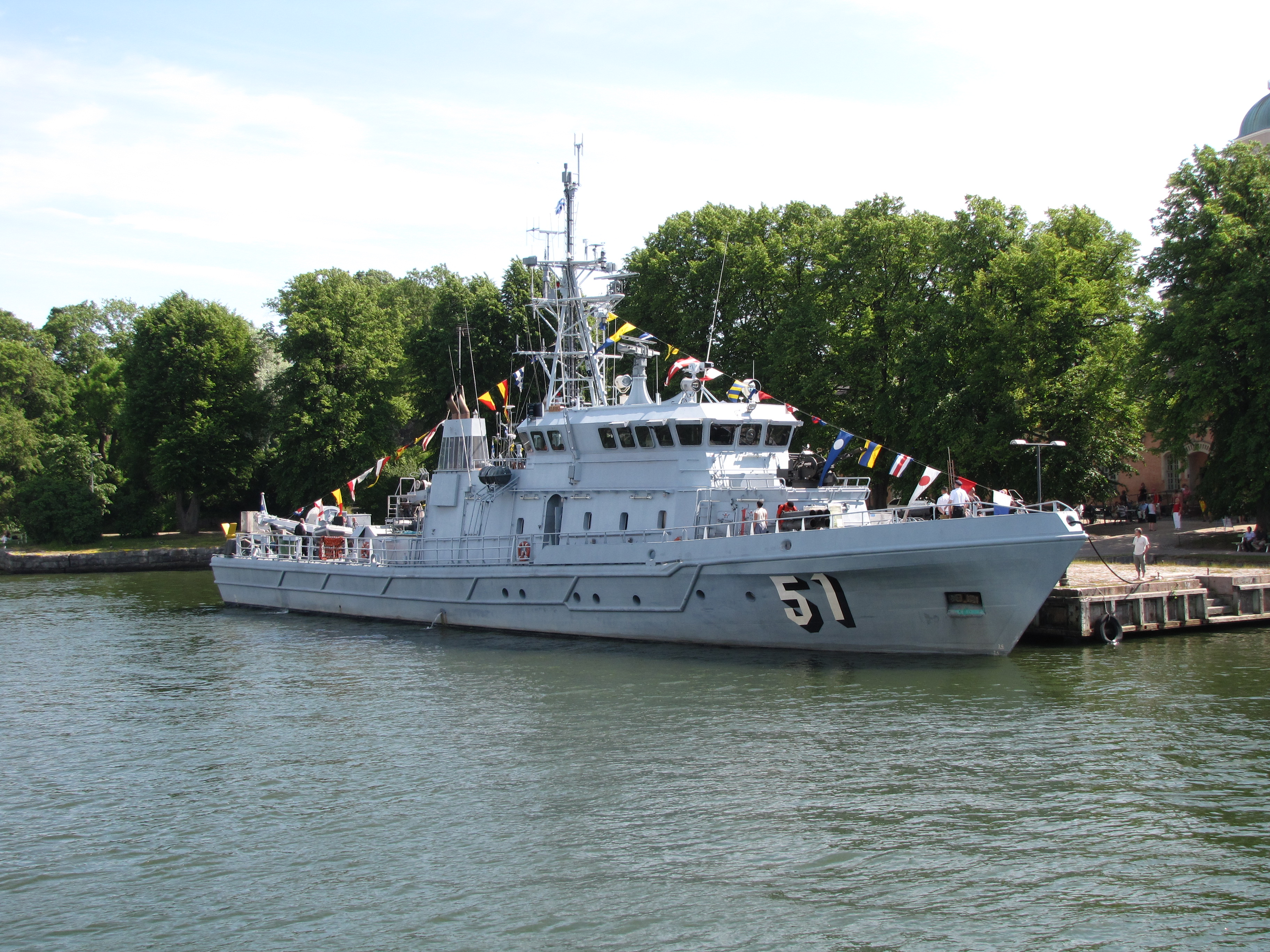
- Kurki in Suomenlinna

Class overview
- Name: Kiisla class
- Operators: Finnish Coast Guard; Finnish Navy
- Preceded by: R class
- Completed: 2
- Scrapped: 2

General characteristics
- Type: Patrol boat
- Displacement: 280 tons
- Length: 48.1 m (158 ft)
- Beam: 8.8 m (29 ft)
- Draught: 2.2 m (7 ft)
- Installed power: 2 × MTU 16V538TB93 engines; 2 × 2,750 kW (3,688 hp)
- Propulsion: KaMeWa water jets
- Speed: 25 knots (46 km/h; 29 mph)
- Complement: 35
- Armament: 2 × RBU-1200 ASROC launchers; 2 × rails for depth charges; 1 × Sako twin-barrel 23 mm/87 (modified ZU-23-2)

The Kiisla class was a Finnish class of two patrol boats later converted to anti-submarine warfare vessels. The ships were built in 1984 and 1988 at the Hollming shipyard in Rauma, Finland for the Finnish Coast Guard. They were transferred to the Finnish Navy in 2004.

The two vessels of the class formed the Guard Squadron (Finnish: Vartioviirikkö) of the 7th Missile Boat Flotilla and they were based at Upinniemi.

After only a few years in service in the Finnish Navy, the Kiisla-class patrol boats were laid up and offered for sale. In January 2013, the Finnish shipowner Joakim Håkans proposed that the unused vessels should be donated to Djibouti, where they would be used for anti-piracy patrols. On 10 July 2013, it was announced that as no sufficient buyer had been found, Kiisla and Kurki would be scrapped and salvaged parts used as spares for other vessels of the Finnish Navy. The ships were broken up in 2015.

== Vessels of the class ==
- Kiisla (50)
- Kurki (51)
