= Taisto-class motor torpedo boat =

Motor torpedo boat series

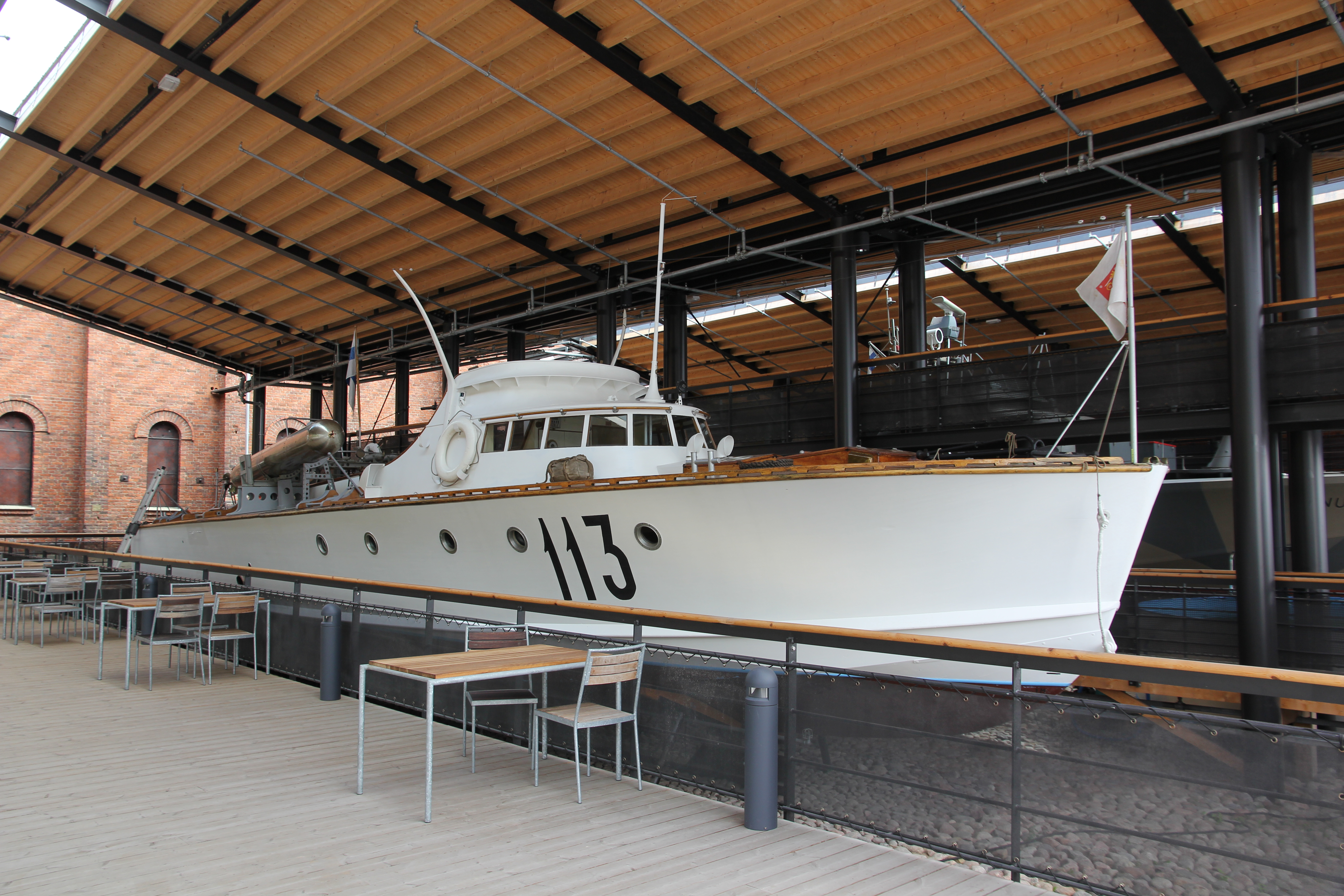
- Tyrsky preserved at Forum Marinum

Class overview
- Name: Taisto class
- Builders: Turun Veneveistämö
- Operators: Finnish Navy
- Completed: 8
- Lost: 1
- Retired: 7
- Preserved: 2

General characteristics
- Type: Motor torpedo boat
- Displacement: 22 t (22 long tons)
- Length: 17.8 m (58 ft 5 in)
- Beam: 4.3 m (14 ft 1 in)
- Draught: 1.2 m (3 ft 11 in)
- Propulsion: 2 × Isotta Fraschini petrol engines; 1,700 kW (2,300 bhp)
- Speed: 48 knots (89 km/h; 55 mph)
- Complement: 1+10
- Armament: 1 × 20 mm (0.79 in) Madsen gun; 2 × 450 mm (18 in) torpedoes

The Taisto-class motor torpedo boats or T class was a series of motor torpedo boats, which saw service with the Finnish Navy during World War II. Following the war, the Paris Peace Treaty of 1947 prohibited the Finnish Navy from employing torpedo-carrying vessels of any kind and the Taisto class were converted into motor gunboats. By 1964, all vessels of the class had been removed from service.

== Background and description ==
Following the invasion of the Soviet Union by Germany in World War II, the war between Finland and the Soviet Union began again. The Finnish Navy, tasked with closing the Gulf of Finland, sought more vessels. Based on an Italian design and built under license, eight Taisto vessels were manufactured at Turun Veneveistämö. All eight vessels were launched between 1943 and 1946. The vessels had a displacement of 22 tonnes (22 long tons), and were 17.8 metres (58 ft 5 in) long with a beam of 4.3 m (14 ft 1 in) and a draught of 1.2 m (3 ft 11 in). They were powered by two Isotta Fraschini petrol engines creating 1,700 kilowatts (2,300 bhp) and had a maximum speed of 48 knots (89 km/h; 55 mph). (Note: Blackman has their maximum speed as 42 knots (78 km/h; 48 mph)) They mounted two 450-millimetre (18 in) torpedo tubes and one 20 mm (0.79 in) Madsen gun.

== Vessels in class ==
Taisto class construction data
Number	Ship	Builder	Fate
T 1	Tarmo	Turun Veneveistämö	
T 2	Taisto / Taisto 2	Turun Veneveistämö	Scrapped 1963
T 3	Tyrsky / Taisto 3	Turun Veneveistämö	Removed from service in 1966. Preserved at the Turku Maritime Museum Forum Marinum.
T 4	Tuima / Taisto 4	Turun Veneveistämö	Scrapped 1963
T 5	Tuisku / Taisto 5	Turun Veneveistämö	Scrapped 1963
T 6	Tuuli / Taisto 6	Turun Veneveistämö	Removed from service in 1966
T 7	Taisto 7	Turun Veneveistämö	Removed from service in 1966. Preserved in a running state as MS Seiska in Lappeenranta, Finland.
T 8	Taisto 8	Turun Veneveistämö	Removed from service in 1966.

== Service history ==
The Paris Peace Treaty of 1947 was signed following the end of World War II, and Finland was prohibited by the treaty from having torpedo-carrying vessels. The Taisto class were converted to motor gunboats with their torpedo armament and 20 mm gun being removed and the vessels receiving one 40 mm (1.6 in) gun and two 13 mm (0.51 in) guns. (Note: Blackman in both his 1953 edition of Jane's Fighting Ships and his 1960 edition state the armament as one 40 mm gun and one 20 mm gun.) There is some debate amongst the sources over the fate of the ships. Westerlund & Chumbley state that by 1964 all eight vessels had been stricken from the Finnish Navy. However, Blackman states that only three had been discarded by 1964 and that four others were only removed from service in 1966.
