= Isku-class motor torpedo boat =

Class overview
- Name: Isku
- Builders: Porvoon Veneveistämö, Porvoo, Finland
- Operators: Finnish Navy
- Preceded by: Sisu class
- Succeeded by: Syöksy class
- Built: 1926
- In commission: 1926–1942
- Completed: 1
- Retired: 1

General characteristics
- Type: Motor torpedo boat
- Displacement: 11 tons
- Length: 16.6 m (54 ft 6 in)
- Beam: 3.4 m (11 ft 2 in)
- Draught: 1.1 m (3 ft 7 in)
- Propulsion: 2 × Rolls-Royce gasoline engines; 597 kW (801 hp)
- Speed: 31 knots (57 km/h; 36 mph)
- Complement: 1+6
- Armament: 2 × 450 mm torpedoes; 2 × 7.62 mm machine guns; 2 × depth charges

The Isku-class motor torpedo boat (English: Strike) was a Thornycroft type motor torpedo boat of the Finnish Navy. The vessel was constructed in 1926 by the Borgå varv, in Porvoo, Finland, and she saw service in World War II. Isku differed from the original Thornycraft design through its torpedo launching method (they were released from the sides of the hull, in contrast to dropping them from the aft). However, she was not a successful design and she only participated in the Winter War and during the first months of the Continuation War. She was stricken from the navy lists in 1942, due to extensive wear damage on the hull. She was moored at Suomenlinna and was scrapped after the war.

== Vessels of the class ==
Isku
ex-MTV 3 in Finnish service.
