= Forum Marinum =

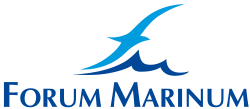
- Established: 1999
- Location: Linnankatu 72, 20100 Turku, Finland
- Coordinates: 60.4370°N 22.2358°E
- Type: Maritime Museum
- Visitors: 56 000 (2006); 115 000 (2014)
- Director: Ulla Teräs
- Website: www.forum-marinum.fi

Forum Marinum is maritime museum located in Turku, Finland.

== History ==
The museum was founded in 1999 by merging of Turku maritime museum established in 1977 and Åbo Akademi University museum of maritime history established in 1936.

Lonely Planet Scandinavia describes it as "an impressive maritime museum", and notes that it is near Turku Castle.

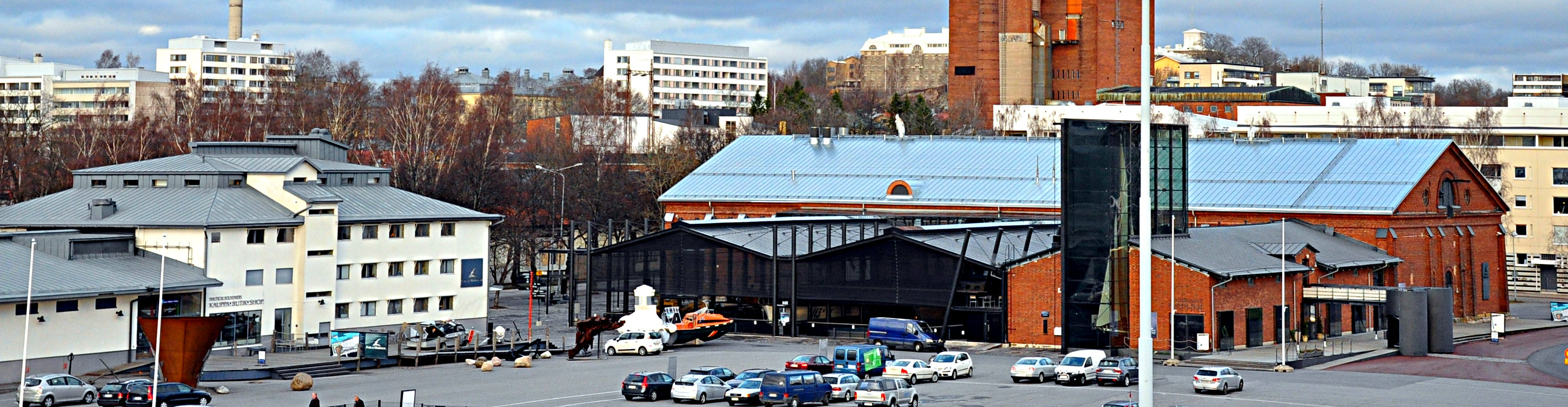
Forum Marinum buildings from Bore

== Exhibitions ==
The main exhibition was renewed in 2016 and it is now called Work at Sea. Other permanent exhibitions include:

- The Five Lives of our National Treasure (The history of the Suomen Joutsen from 1902 to 2009)
- The Forum Marinum exhibition on board the Bore (History of the Bore from construction to the present day)
- At the Shipyard (History of the Finnish Shipbuilding)
- At the Engine Factory (History of the Ship Engine Manufacturing in Turku)

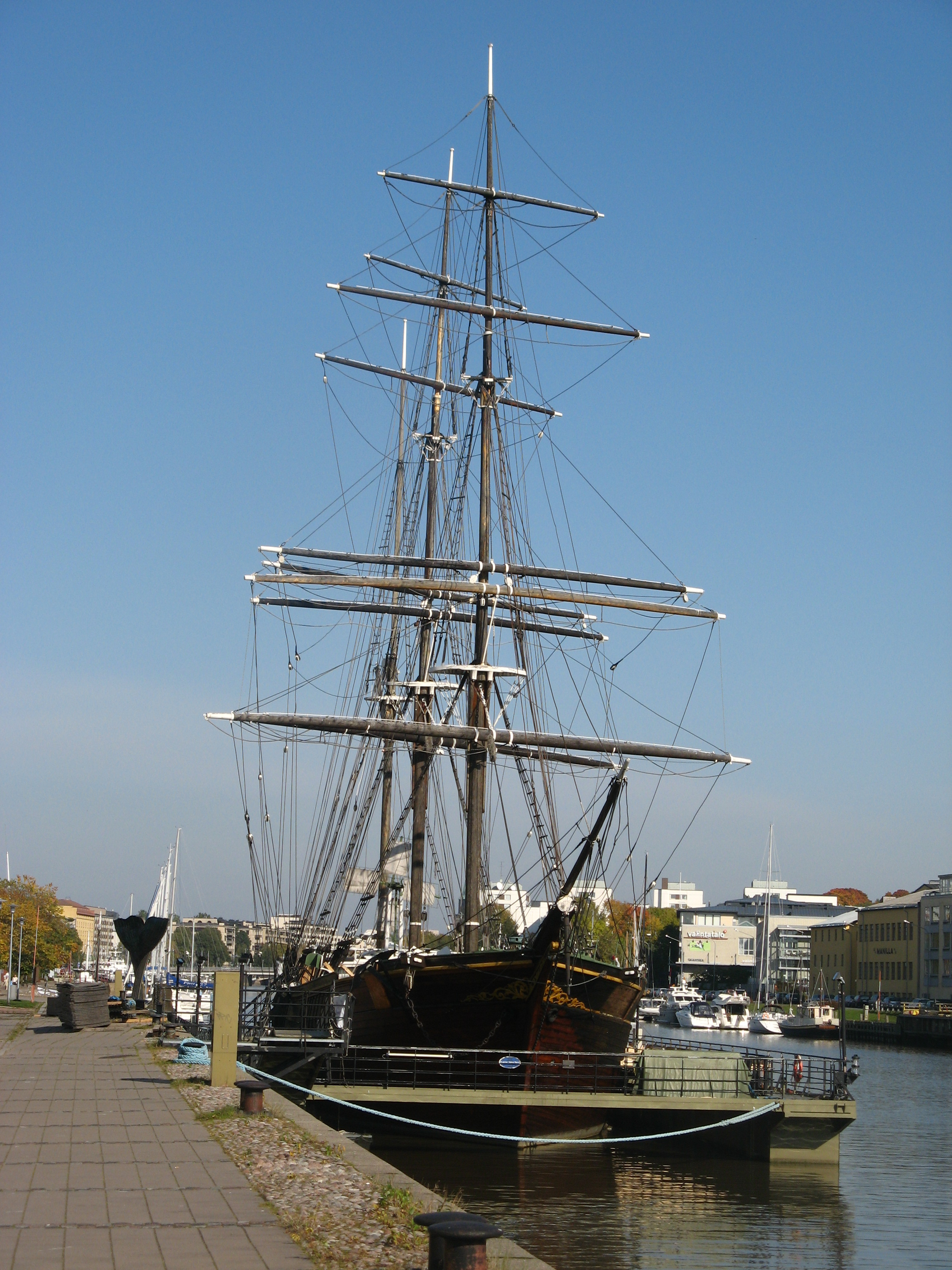
Sigyn in the Aura River in Turku (2008)

== Museum ships ==
- Full-rigged ship Suomen Joutsen
- Barque Sigyn
- Bermuda ketch Daphne
- Steam tugboat Vetäjä V
- Turunmaa-class gunboat Karjala
- Minelayer Keihässalmi
- Von Fersen-class transport vessel Wilhelm Carpelan
- Nuoli-class fast gunboat Nuoli 8
- Taisto-class motor torpedo boat Tyrsky (Taisto 3)
- MS Bore, a former steam-powered cruise ship currently used as a floating hostel
- Coast patrol boat RV 214 (Rautaville)
- Police boat PMV-1391
- Pilot cutter MKL 2103
