= Ahven-class minesweeper =

Class overview
- Name: Ahven class
- Operators: Finnish Navy
- Preceded by: A class
- Succeeded by: Kuha class
- Built: 1936–1937
- In commission: 1936–1961
- Completed: 6
- Retired: 6

General characteristics
- Type: Minesweeper
- Displacement: 17 t (17 long tons)
- Length: 17.2 m (56 ft)
- Beam: 3.7 m (12 ft 2 in)
- Draught: 1.3 m (4 ft 3 in)
- Propulsion: Diesel engine, 48 kW (65 bhp)
- Speed: 10.5 knots (19.4 km/h; 12.1 mph)
- Complement: 8
- Armament: 1 × 20 mm (0.8 in) gun

The Ahven-class minesweepers (English: Perch) were a series of six minesweepers of the Finnish Navy. The ships were constructed in 1936–1937 at the Turun Veneveistämö Shipyard in Finland and saw service during World War II. The Ahven class was stricken in 1961.

== Description ==
The Ahven class were a series of minesweepers that had a standard displacement of 17 tonnes (17 long tons). They measured 17.2 metres (56 ft) long with a beam of 3.7 m (12 ft 2 in) and a draught of 1.3 m (4 ft 3 in). The vessels were powered by a diesel engine rated at 48 kilowatts (65 bhp) turning one propeller giving the minesweepers a maximum speed of 10.5 knots (19.4 km/h; 12.1 mph). (Note: Blackman has the engines rated at 45 kW (60 hp)) The Ahven class were armed with one 20 mm (0.8 in) gun mounted on the deck forward and had a complement of 8 officers and ratings.

== Ships in class ==
The six Ahven-class minesweepers were:

- Ahven – renamed to Ahven 1
- Kiiski – renamed to Ahven 2
- Muikku – renamed to Ahven 3
- Särki – renamed to Ahven 4
- Kuore – renamed to Ahven 5
- Lahna – renamed to Ahven 6

== Service history ==
All six vessels of the class were constructed by Turun Veneveistämö Shipyard in Finland and launched in 1936–1937. Designated a motor minesweeper, the Ahven class were later renamed and were stricken in 1961.

== See also ==
- List of ship classes of the Second World War

== Sources ==
- Blackman, Raymond V. B., ed. (1953). Jane's Fighting Ships 1953–54. London: Sampson, Low and Marston. OCLC 913556389.
- Chesneau, Roger, ed. (1980). Conway's All the World's Fighting Ships 1922–1946. Greenwich, UK: Conway Maritime Press. ISBN 0-85177-146-7.
