= Sisu-class motor torpedo boat =

Class overview
- Name: Finnish: Sisu-luokka, lit. 'Sisu class'
- Builders: Fratelli Orlando, Leghorn, Italy
- Operators: Regia Marina; Finnish Navy
- Succeeded by: Isku class
- Built: 1916–1917 (Note: Fifteen boats of this series (MAS 218–232) were built until 1918.)
- In commission: 1917–1942 (Note: Two boats in Finnish service (ex–MAS 220 and ex–MAS 221) out of 15 built in this series (MAS 218–232).)
- Completed: 2
- Retired: 2

General characteristics
- Type: Orlando-12-tonne-type MAS boats (2nd series)
- Displacement: 12.9 t (12.7 long tons; 14.2 short tons)
- Length: 16.4 m (53 ft 10 in)
- Beam: 3 m (9 ft 6 in)
- Draft: 1.4 m (4 ft 7 in)
- Propulsion: 2 × 510-metric-horsepower (500 hp) Isotta Frachini petrol engines; 2 × 10-metric-horsepower (10 hp) Rognini electric motors (Note: Only for MAS 218–222 and MAS 228 from this series.)
- Speed: 28 knots (52 km/h; 32 mph) on Isotta Frachini petrol engines; 4 knots (7.4 km/h; 4.6 mph) on Rognini electric motors
- Range: 150 nmi (280 km; 170 mi)
- Crew: 8
- Armament: 2 or 3 × 6.5 mm machine guns (in Italian service); 1 or 2 × machine guns (in Finnish service); 2 × 450 mm (18 in) torpedoes; 4 × depth charges; 2 × naval mines

The Sisu-class motor torpedo boats (named after sisu) were two World War I–era Italian 12-tonne (12-long-ton; 13-short-ton) MAS boats, also known as A-group MAS boats, which were in service with the Finnish Navy. The vessels, later designated the Sisu class in Finnish service, were launched in 1916 at the Fratelli Orlando Shipyard in Leghorn, Italy, and were the 2nd series of Orlando-12-tonne-type MAS boats. In 1917, they were commissioned in the Regia Marina as MAS 220 and MAS 221.

MAS 220 and MAS 221 were acquired by the Finnish Government in 1920, and were commissioned in the Finnish Navy as MTV 1 and MTV 2 in 1922 but later renamed to Sisu and Hurja. They saw service in World War II. When dashing forward at full speed, the vessels sprayed water high in the air, earning the nickname "fountains" from Finnish sailors.

On the night of October 1–2, 1941, Sisu—together with Nuoli—was patrolling east of Gogland when it came across large, stationary Soviet naval ships. According to some Finnish sources, Sisu missed with her first torpedo, having mistaken the foam painted on a Soviet warship's bow for an indication that it was actually moving. A second torpedo hit a Fugas-class minesweeper amidship and sank her. According to other sources, Sisu and Nuoli allegedly sank two Soviet minesweepers as a result of this attack. In reality, according to Soviet sources and modern Russian research, Sisu and Nuoli made an abortive attack on the Soviet submarine L-3 anchored in the bay of Gogland Island at the time.

== Vessels of the class ==
Sisu
Ex–MTV 1 in Finnish service, and ex–MAS 220 in Italian service. She was used as a torpedo boat until 1942, and then transferred to the Naval Detachment K on Lake Ladoga, where she served as a patrol vessel. Sisu was broken up after the war.

Hurja
Ex–MTV 2 in Finnish service, and ex–MAS 221 in Italian service. She was used as a torpedo boat until 1941. Hurja was broken up after the war.
