= Nuoli-class gunboat =

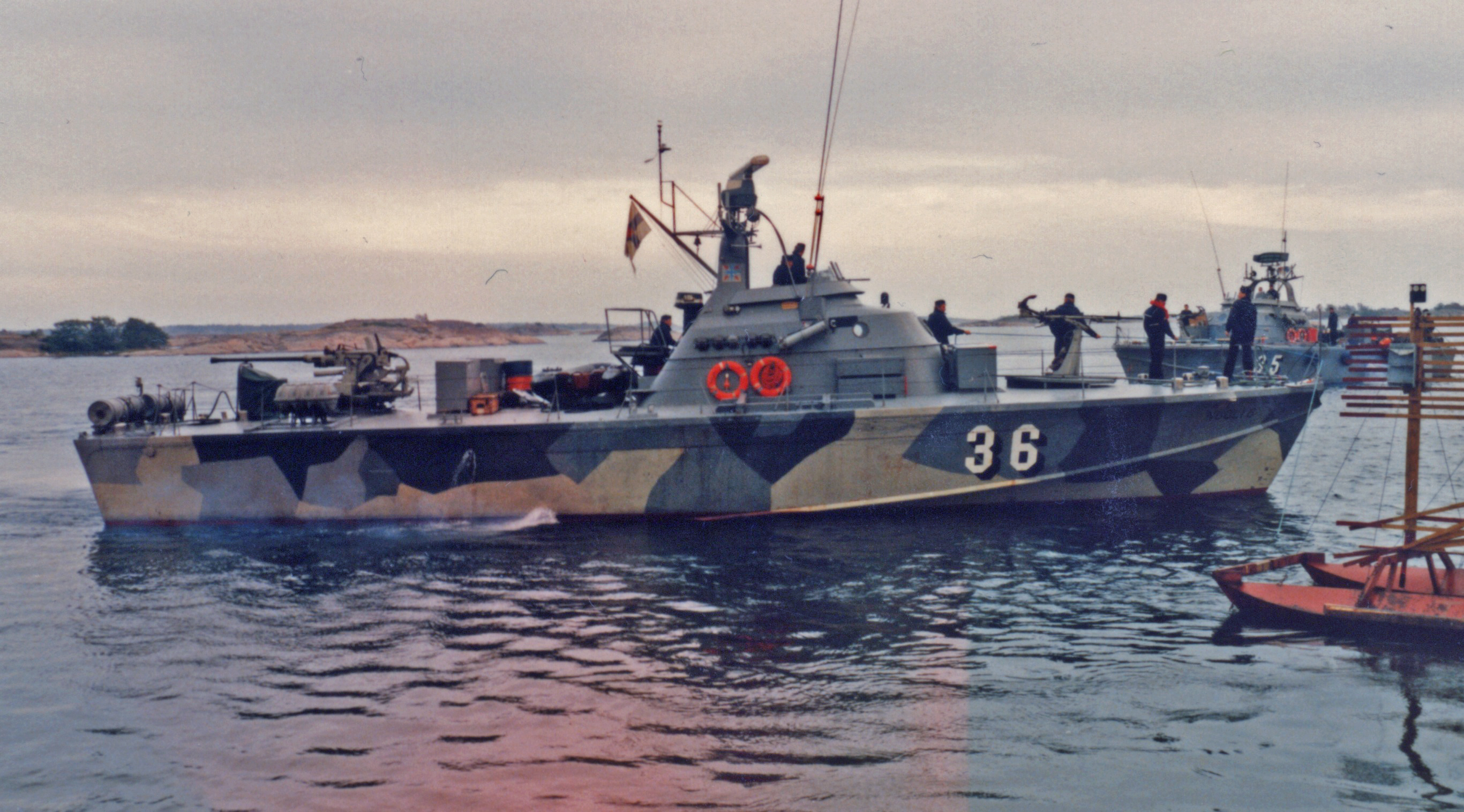
- Nuoli-class fast gunboat

Class overview
- Name: Nuoli
- Builders: Oy Laivateollisuus Ab
- Completed: 13

General characteristics
- Type: Fast attack craft
- Length: 22.0 m
- Beam: 6.6 m
- Draught: 1.5 m
- Propulsion: 3 × Zvezda M50 F water cooled V-12 diesel; each developing 880 kW (1200 hp)
- Speed: 45 knots (top speed); 25 knots (cruise speed)
- Complement: 15
- Crew: 20
- Armament: 1× 40 mm Bofors; 1× 20 mm Madsen
- Notes: Ships in class include: Nuoli 1, Nuoli 2, Nuoli 3, Nuoli 4, Nuoli 5, Nuoli 6, Nuoli 7, Nuoli 8, Nuoli 9, Nuoli 10, Nuoli 11, Nuoli 12, Nuoli 13

The Nuoli-class motor gunboats (English: Arrow) was a series of thirteen fast attack craft of the Finnish Navy. The ships were constructed in 1961 by Oy Laivateollisuus Ab in Turku, and modernized in 1979. The Nuoli motor gunboats played a very important role in naval training and were in service until the early 90s.

There are two distinctive versions, 1-10 and 11-13. The former could be distinguished by having a higher superstructure.

All were equipped with three Soviet-made Zvezda M50 F V-12 four stroke, water cooled diesel engines displacing 62.4 litres. They had a mechanical supercharger and a compressed air starter, developing 1200 hp at 1850 rpm max. There was no separate cruise engine, except from a small auxiliary engine that produced electricity. The vessels were first equipped with large screws, but later changed to smaller, albeit equally effective screws, manufactured by FinnScrew.

The main armament of the Nuoli-class was a Bofors 40 mm gun mounted aft. It was later planned to be equipped with an electrically-controlled Bofors 40/70-system, but limitations of the auxiliary engine prevented this. The forward armament was a Madsen 20/60. For a brief period these were replaced with Breda 12.7 mm heavy machine-gun which came from WWII-period Fiat G.50 fighters formerly used by the Finnish Air Force; the change back to Madsen was done in 1981.

Finland was forbidden to have torpedo boats after World War II, but the Nuoli-class could quickly be converted into such, if need arose. in 1982, Nuoli-6 was transferred and ferried to the Upinniemi (Swedish: Obbnäs) torpedo test station in southern Finland to be used as test vessel for a new Finnish-origin torpedo system, which failed. The trip to Obbnäs was made in heavy weather - the waves were so hard that they damaged the wooden support structure of the bow. Nuoli-6 was driven aground in Obbnäs in mid-1983 and was stricken.

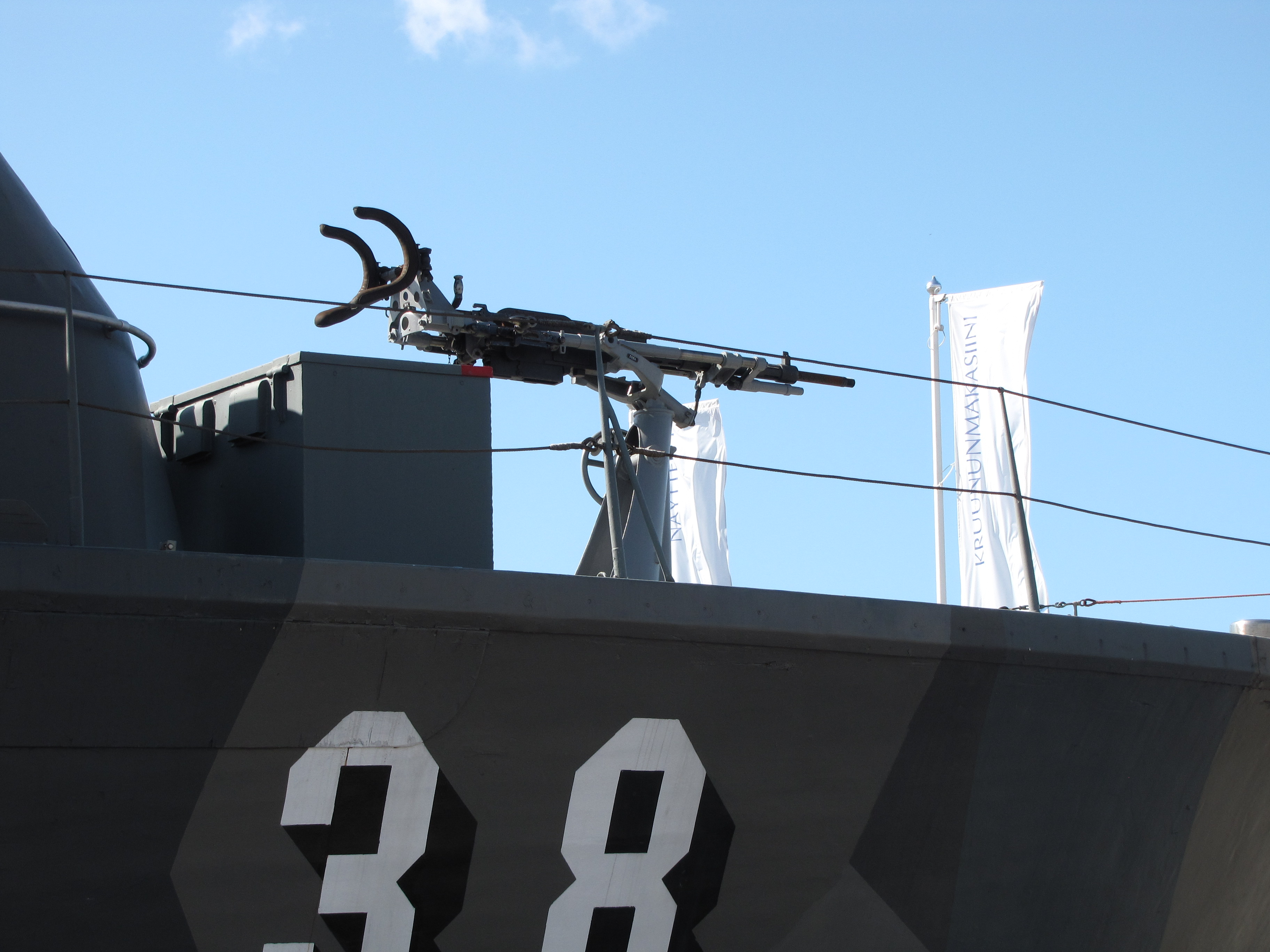
20 mm Madsen autocannon on Nuoli 8

The vessels are today spread all over Finland, and one, Nuoli 12, is in Germany. Nuoli 8 is preserved at the Turku marine museum Forum Marinum.

== Vessels of the class ==
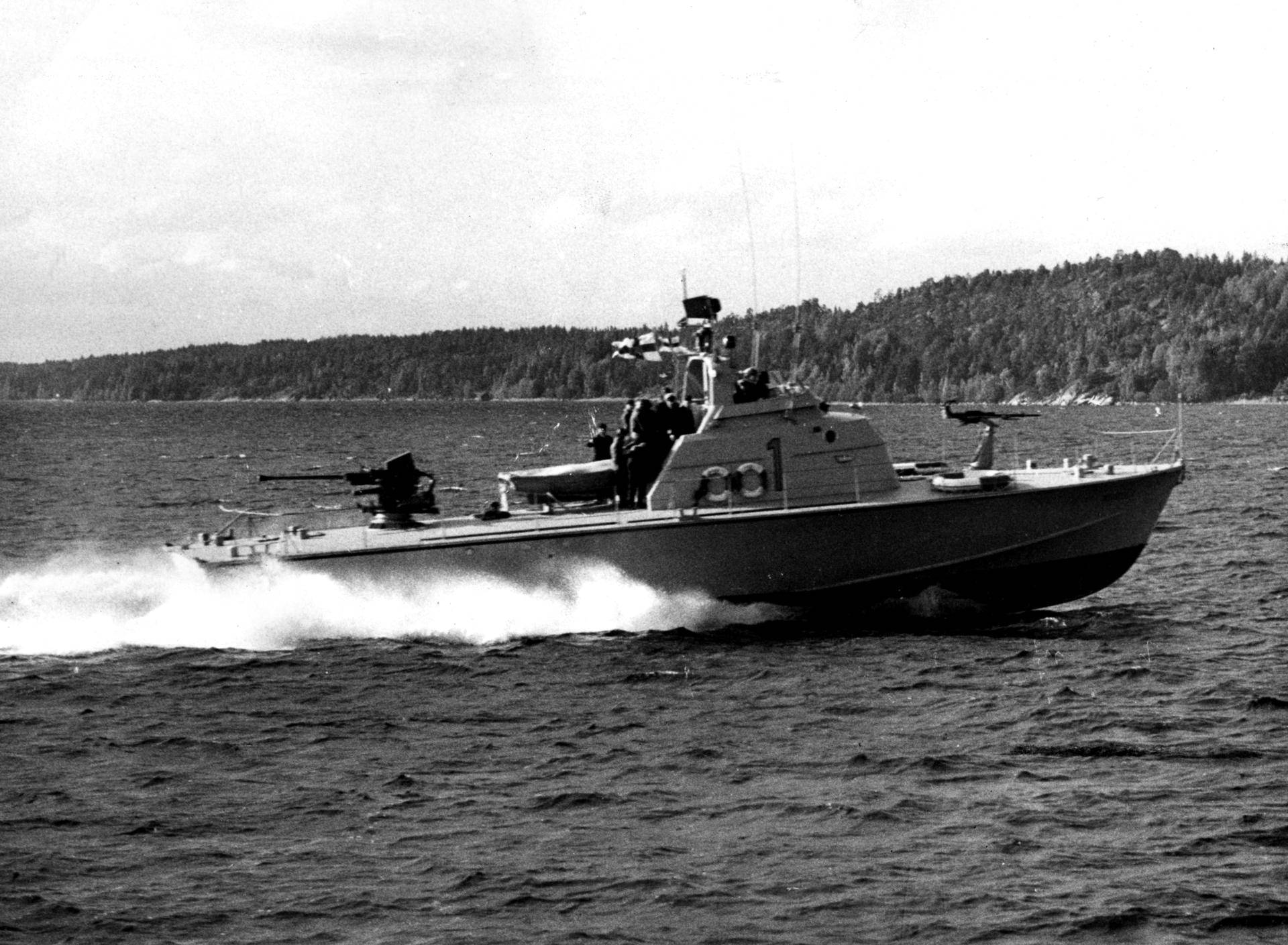
Nuoli 1 with Bofors and Madsen cannon in 1961

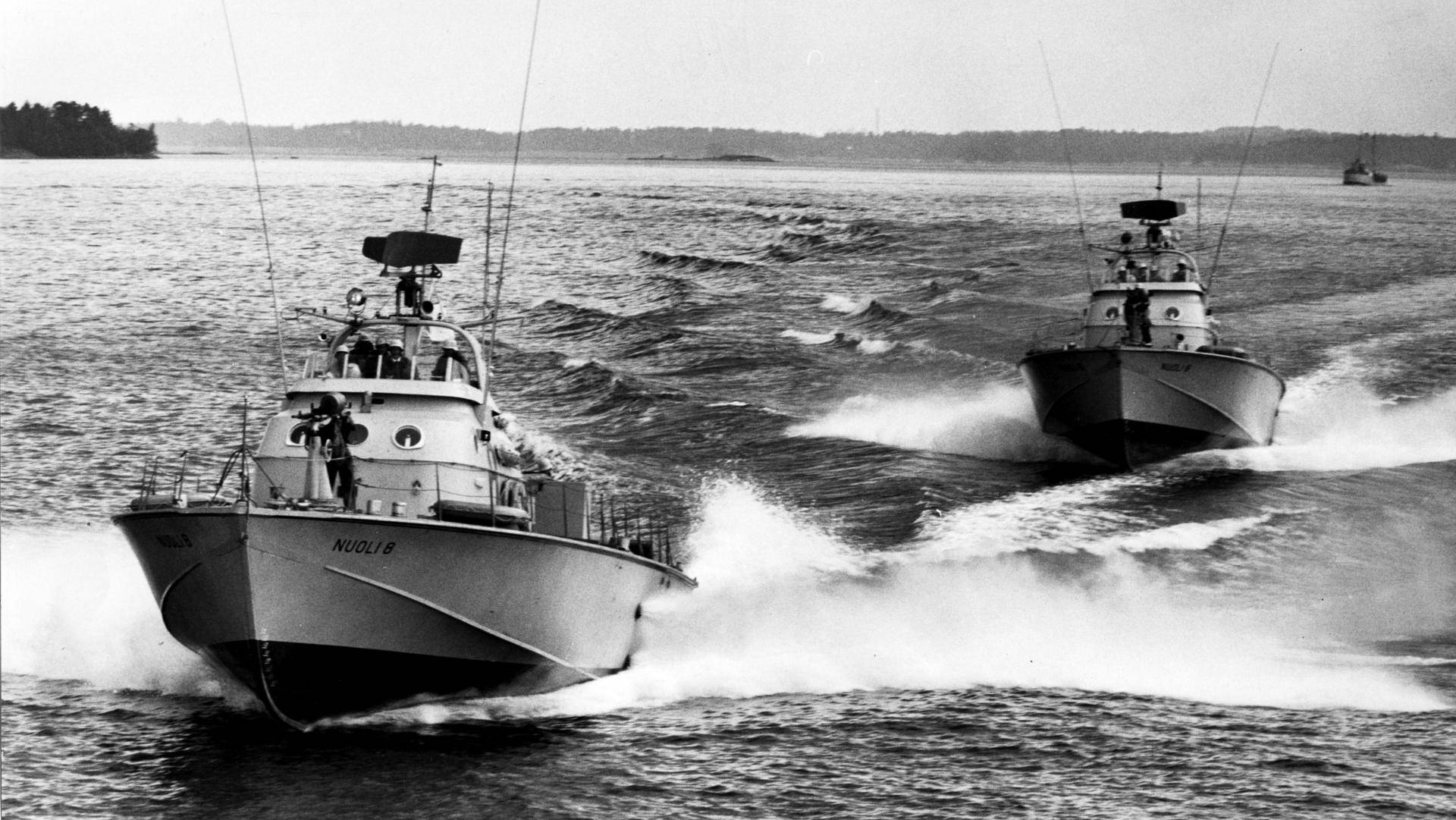
Nuoli 8 at speed in 1963

Nuoli 1
(Pennant number: 31)
Nuoli 2
(Pennant number: 32)
Nuoli 3
(Pennant number: 33)
Nuoli 4
(Pennant number: 34) Scrapped in 1979
Nuoli 5
(Pennant number: 35)
Nuoli 6
(Pennant number: 36)
Nuoli 7
(Pennant number: 37)
Nuoli 8
(Pennant number: 38) On display at the maritime museum Forum Marinum
Nuoli 9
(Pennant number: 39) Scrapped in 1980
Nuoli 10
(Pennant number: 40) In Private ownership berther in Helsinki, Finland.

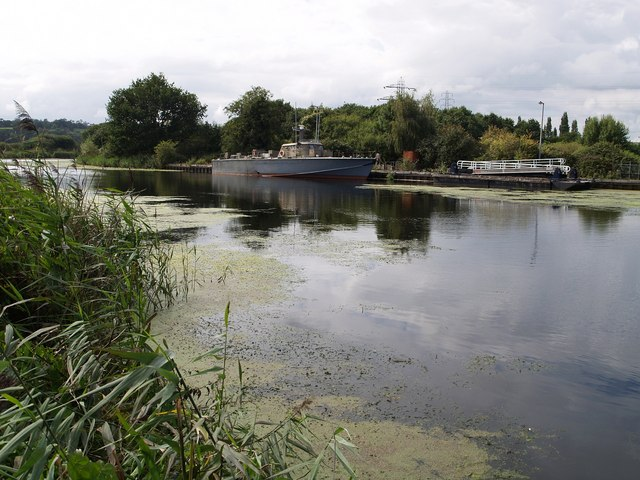
Nuoli 11 moored on the Exeter Ship Canal in 2007

Nuoli 11
(Pennant number: 41) – In private ownership by Servo Engineering Ltd, berthed on the Exeter Ship Canal, UK. A team travelled to Finland to prepare Nuolli 11 for her journey to Exeter. "This involved stripping her hull, filling and repainting, overhauling her main generator for 3-phase power to warm the main engines; these were intact but required all the support systems to be installed including oil tanks, exhaust and fuel systems." The route back to the UK included passing down the Swedish and Danish coasts to enter the Kiel canal. They rested in Germany for a few weeks until the weather had improved in the North Sea, then headed overnight to Harwich. Then she passed through the English Channel and across to Exmouth, finally entering the Exeter canal (pictures at top of page). Sunk at berth and raised, February 2017, awaiting repairs on dockside with serious structural damage to the port side.
Nuoli 12
(Pennant number: 42) built in 1964, now in use as "Traditional Boat" in Germany, rebuilt near to origin state, non-profit association "Traditionsschiff NUOLI 12 e.V." scrapped in Denmark in 2016
Nuoli 13
(Pennant number: 43) – In private ownership in Savonlinna, Finland
