= Kuha-class minesweeper (1941) =

Class overview
- Name: Kuha class
- Preceded by: Ahven class
- Completed: 18

General characteristics
- Type: Minesweeper
- Displacement: 18 tons
- Length: 17.1 m (56 ft)
- Beam: 3.8 m (12 ft)
- Draught: 1.5 m (5 ft)
- Speed: 9 knots (17 km/h; 10 mph)
- Armament: 1 × 20 mm Madsen
- Notes: Ships in class include: Kuha, Salakka, Siika, Harjus, Säynäs, Karppi, Kuha 7, Kuha 8, Kuha 9, Kuha 10, Kuha 11, Kuha 12, Kuha 13, Kuha 14, Kuha 15, Kuha 16, Kuha 17, Kuha 18

The Kuha-class minesweepers (English: Zander) was a series of eighteen small minesweepers of the Finnish Navy. The ships were constructed in three batches between 1941 and 1946. Some of the vessels participated in World War II, but their main mission were to be the demining of the Gulf of Finland after the war.

The vessels were built by August Eklöf Ab in Porvoo, starting in 1941. The Kuha class was developed from the Ahven class and were similar in appearance.

== Vessels of the class ==
=== Kuha 1-6 ===
- Kuha 1, Kuha lost 3 November 1941
- Kuha 2, Salakka: Scrapped in 1959.
- Kuha 3, Siika Sunk off Suusaari by mines 30 Sept., 1944
- Kuha 4, Harjus: Scrapped in 1959, or sunk by mine off Hanko 28 July 1940, or lost 23 July 1942
- Kuha 5, Säynäs
- Kuha 6, Karppi Sunk off Kotka by mines 15 Sept., 1944

=== Kuha 7-14 ===
Delivered in 1945

- Kuha 7
- Kuha 8
- Kuha 9: Scrapped in 1960.
- Kuha 10
- Kuha 11
- Kuha 12
- Kuha 13
- Kuha 14

=== Kuha 15-18 ===
Delivered in 1946

- Kuha 15
- Kuha 16
- Kuha 17
- Kuha 18
