= Hurja-class motor torpedo boat =

Class overview
- Name: Hurja class
- Builders: Cantieri Baglietto, Genoa, Italy
- Operators: Finnish Navy
- Built: 1941
- Completed: 5
- Retired: 5

General characteristics
- Type: Motor torpedo boat
- Displacement: 20 t (20 long tons)
- Length: 16.5 m (54 ft 2 in)
- Beam: 4.3 m (14 ft 1 in)
- Draught: 1.5 m (4 ft 11 in)
- Propulsion: 2 × Isotta Fraschini petrol engines; 1,200 kW (1,600 bhp)
- Speed: 36 knots (67 km/h; 41 mph)
- Armament: 1 × 20 mm (0.79 in) Madsen gun; 2 × 13 mm (0.51 in) guns; 2 × 450 mm (18 in) torpedo tubes; 2 × depth charge racks

The Hurja-class motor torpedo boats (English: Fierce) or H class was an Italian-designed class of Finnish motor torpedo boats, seeing service with the Finnish Navy during World War II. The five boats of the H class were built by Cantieri Baglietto in Genoa, Italy. The ships were converted into patrol boats in 1949, in accordance with the Paris peace treaty and their torpedo armament, forbidden by the treaty, was removed. The H class were stricken from the naval vessel register in 1963.

== Design and description ==
The Hurja class were a class of Italian-designed motor torpedo boat. They measured 16.5 metres (54 ft 2 in) long overall with a beam of 4.3 m (14 ft 1 in) and a draught of1.5 m (4 ft 11 in). They had a displacement of 20 tonnes (20 long tons). They were propelled by two Isotta Fraschini petrol engines creating 1,200 kilowatts (1,600 bhp). This gave them a maximum speed of 36 knots (67 km/h; 41 mph). The Hurjas were armed with a single 20-millimetre (0.79 in) Madsen gun, two 13 mm (0.51 in) guns, two 450 mm (18 in) torpedo tubes and two depth charge racks.

== Vessels of the class ==
Hurja class construction data
Number	Ship	Builder	Launched	Fate
H 1	Hyöky	Cantieri Baglietto, Genoa, Italy	1941	Stricken 1963
H 2	Hirmu	Cantieri Baglietto, Genoa, Italy	1941	Stricken 1963
H 3	Hurja	Cantieri Baglietto, Genoa, Italy	1941	Stricken 1963
H 4	Hyrsky	Cantieri Baglietto, Genoa, Italy	1941	Stricken 1963
H 5	Häijy	Cantieri Baglietto, Genoa, Italy	1941	Stricken 1963

== Construction and career ==
All four vessels were constructed at Cantieri Baglietto in Genoa, Italy. The Paris Peace Treaty of 1947 was signed following the end of World War II, and Finland was prohibited by the treaty from having torpedo-carrying vessels. The ships were converted into motor gunboats in 1949, in accordance with the treaty. They were rearmed with two 20 mm guns and two 13 mm guns. They were stricken in 1963. (Note: Blackman has them rearmed with one 40 mm (1.6 in) gun and one 20 mm gun and having a maximum speed of 32 knots (59 km/h; 37 mph).)
