= Finnish motor torpedo boats of World War II =

The Finnish Navy used several different types of motor torpedo boats during World War II. Four Soviet motor torpedo boats were captured and commissioned by the Finnish Navy during the World War II. One of these was of larger D-3 class while three others belonged to G-5 class.

== Sisu-class motor torpedo boats ==
Name	Built	Fate
Sisu	1916	Converted to patrol boat 1941. Stricken from navy lists 1942–1945
Hurja	1916	Stricken from navy lists 1940 due wear and tear

== Isku-class motor torpedo boat ==
Name	Built	Fate
Isku	1926	Stricken from navy lists 1942 due to wear and tear

== Syöksy-class motor torpedo boats ==
Name	Translation	Built	Fate
Syöksy	1928	Converted to patrol boat 1943. Stricken from navy lists 1944	
Nuoli	1928	Converted to patrol boat 1943. Stricken from navy lists 1943–1945	
Vinha	1929	Converted to patrol boat 1943. Stricken from navy lists 1945	
Raju	1929	Lost on 16 May 1943 due collision with underwater boom obstacle	

== Hurja-class motor torpedo boats ==
	Name	Built	In Finnish use	Fate
H 1	Hyöky	1941	1943-1963	Converted to fast patrol boat 1949. Stricken from the lists 1963.
H 2	Hirmu	1941	1943-1963	Converted to fast patrol boat 1949. Stricken from the lists 1963.
H 3	Hurja	1941	1943-1963	Converted to fast patrol boat 1949. Stricken from the lists 1963.
H 4	Hyrsky	1941	1943-1963	Converted to fast patrol boat 1949. Stricken from the lists 1963.
H 5	Häijy	1941	1943-1963	Converted to fast patrol boat 1949. Stricken from the lists 1963.

== Jymy-class motor torpedo boats ==
	Name	Built	In Finnish Navy	Fate
J 1	Jylhä	1939	1943-1961	Converted to fast patrol boat 1949. Stricken from the lists 1961.
J 2	Jyry	1939	1943-1961	Converted to fast patrol boat 1949. Stricken from the lists 1961.
J 3	Jyske	1939	1943-1961	Converted to fast patrol boat 1949. Stricken from the lists 1961.
J 4	Jymy	1939	1943-1961	Converted to fast patrol boat 1949. Stricken from the lists 1961.

== Taisto-class motor torpedo boats ==
	Name	Built	In Finnish Navy	Fate
T 1	Tarmo	1943	1943-1944	Lost 21 June 1944 in air attack.
T 2	Taisto	1943	1943-1962	Converted to fast patrol boat 1949. Stricken from the lists 1962.
T 3	Tyrsky	1943	1943-1964	Converted to fast patrol boat 1949. Preserved at the Turku Maritime Museum .
T 4	Tuima	1943	1943-1964	Converted to fast patrol boat 1949. Stricken from the lists 1964.
T 5	Tuisku	1943	1943-1964	Converted to fast patrol boat 1949. Stricken from the lists 1964.
T 6	Tuuli	1943	1943-1977	Converted to fast patrol boat 1949. Rebuilt for water jets 1977. Stricken from the lists 1979.
T 7	Taisto 7	1946	1946-1965	Converted to fast patrol boat 1949. Stricken from the lists 1965.
T 8	Taisto 8	1946	1946-1965	Converted to fast patrol boat 1949. Stricken from the lists 1965.

== Captured D3-class motor torpedo boat ==
General characteristics
- Class & type: D-3
- Type: Motor torpedo boat
- Displacement: 35 tons
- Length: 21.7 m (71 ft)
- Beam: 3.9 m (13 ft)
- Draught: 0.8 m (2 ft 7 in)
- Speed: 34 knots (63 km/h; 39 mph)
- Complement: 11
- Armament: 2 × 450 mm torpedoes; 1 × 20 mm/60 Madsen; 2 × 12.7 mm machine guns; Later: 1 × 40 mm/60 Bofors; 1 × 20 mm/60 Madsen; 2 × 12.7 mm machine guns; 4 × depth charges

=== Finnish ship of the class ===
- Vasama

Vasama: Ex-TK 52 in Soviet service. She was a Soviet D 3 type motor torpedo boat. She was found sunk at Borstö in October 1941, having run aground in a storm. She probably had tried to escape the German attack on Hiiumaa and Saaremaa. She was used as a torpedo boat in 1943, and changed into a patrol boat in 1943. Returned to Soviet Union after the Continuation War.

== Captured G-5-class motor torpedo boats ==
General characteristics
- Class & type: G-5
- Type: Motor torpedo boat
- Displacement: 16 tons
- Length: 19.3 m (63 ft)
- Beam: 3.4 m (11 ft)
- Draught: 0.7 m (2 ft 4 in)
- Speed: 50 knots (93 km/h; 58 mph)
- Complement: 9
- Armament: 2 × 530 mm torpedoes; 1 × 12.7 mm machine gun; 2 × depth charges

=== Finnish ships of the class ===
- Vihuri
- Viima
- V-3

All G-5 class motor torpedo boats were returned to Soviet Union after the Continuation War.

Vihuri
Also known as V 1 in Finnish service and ex-TK 141 in Soviet service. She was found abandoned at Koivisto in 1941, but she wasn't taken into use until 1943. The Soviet G-5 class motor torpedo boat released its torpedoes by dropping them from rails in the aft. The ship then had to steer away from the torpedoes path, a maneuver that could be quite tricky in the close waters of the Gulf of Finland. Vihuri participated in the attack on the harbour of Lavansaari on November 18, 1942, where Syöksy managed to torpedo the Soviet gunboat Krasnoye Znamya (1,760 tons), which sunk.
Viima
Also known as V 2 in Finnish service, ex-TK 64 in Soviet service. The Viima was a Soviet G 5 type motor torpedo boat, built in aluminum. She was found abandoned at Koivisto in 1941, but she wasn't taken into use until 1943.
V 3
Ex-TK 51 in Soviet service. She was captured at the Bay of Vyborg in June 1944.

== Bibliography ==
- Karl-Eric, Westerlund & Chumbley, Stephen (1995). "Finland". In Chumbley, Stephen (ed.). Conway's All the World's Fighting Ships 1947–1995. Annapolis, Maryland: Naval Institute Press. pp. 91–94. ISBN 1-55750-132-7.
