= Madsen 20 mm cannon =

Danish autocannon

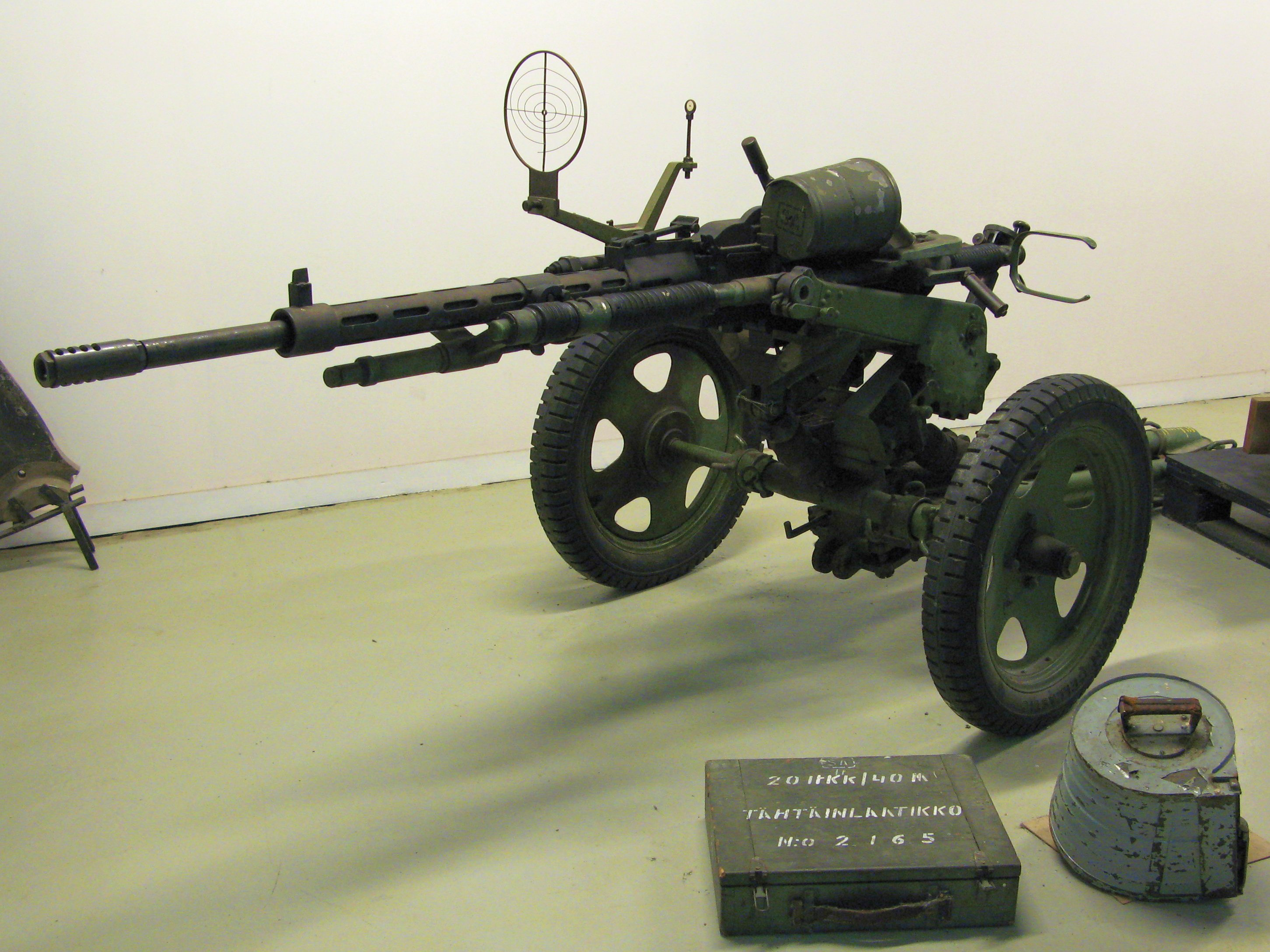
- Madsen 20 mm cannon
- Type: Autocannon
- Place of origin: Denmark

Service history
- Used by: See Users
- Wars: Spanish Civil War; Second Sino-Japanese War; World War II; Winter War; Continuation War; Chinese Civil War

Specifications
- Mass: 55 kilograms (121 lb)
- Length: 2.5 m (8 ft 2 in)
- Barrel length: 1.2 m (3 ft 11 in) L/60
- Cartridge: 20 x 120 mm
- Cartridge weight: .29 kg (10 oz) AP.32 kg (11 oz) HE
- Caliber: 20 mm
- Barrels: air-cooled
- Action: recoil-operated
- Rate of fire: 400 rpm (cyclic); 250 rpm (practical)
- Muzzle velocity: 900 m/s (3,000 ft/s)
- Effective firing range: 500 m (1,600 ft)
- Maximum firing range: 2,123 m (6,965 ft)
- Feed system: 10, 15 or 60 round magazine

20x120 mm Madsen
- Type: Autocannon
- Place of origin: Denmark

Production history
- Manufacturer: Kynoch

Specifications
- Rim diameter: 28.9mm

The 20 mm AA Machine Cannon M/38 was a 20 mm rapid fire autocannon produced by the Danish company Dansk Industri Syndikat (DISA). The gun, which could be adapted to several tactical uses, was a primary weapon of the armed forces of Denmark. It was also exported to numerous countries around the world because of its versatility. The cannon was built at the DISA works in Herlev near Copenhagen. The company supplied several different types of mountings with the weapon for a variety of roles, such as air defense, anti-tank warfare, and on naval ships.

== Design ==
The 20 mm Madsen Cannon was originally designed by Colonel V. H. O. Madsen of the Royal Danish Army. A version with a necked-out 23 mm round was also produced as the 23 mm Madsen.

== Combat ==
Several 20 mm machine cannons of the Danish Army were responsible for knocking out eleven armored cars and two Panzer Is during the German invasion on April 9, 1940.

A special variant, the Madsen F5, was designed as an anti-tank gun. It proved very effective against Japanese tanks until the end of the Second Sino-Japanese War. It was a fully automatic weapon, with two small wheels and a 15-round magazine. At 100 m, it pierced 42 mm of armor, and 32 mm at 500 m. This model was reverse engineered by the Chinese 21st arsenal of Nanjing, but only five were produced in 1944.

== Mounts ==
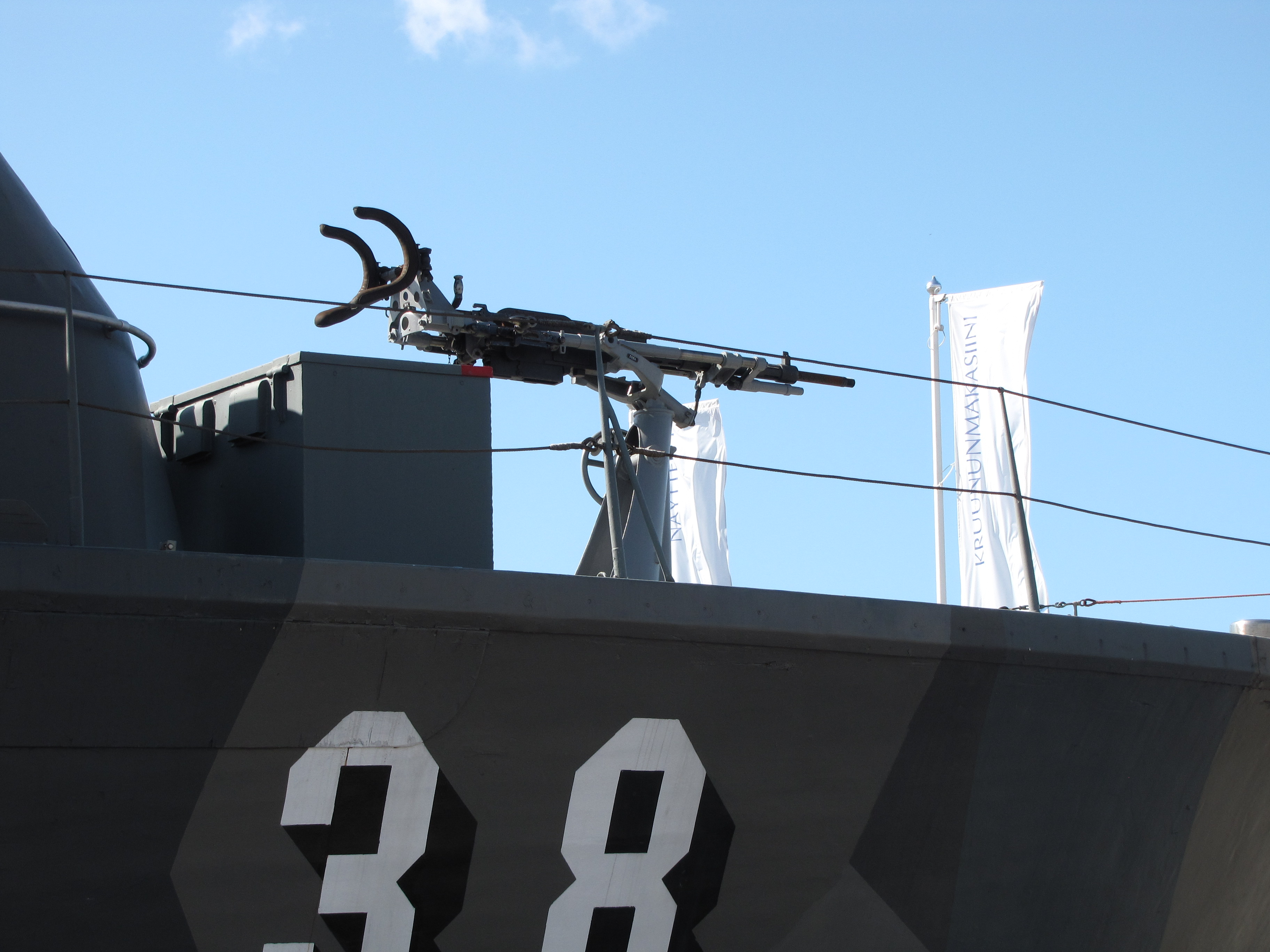
A 20mm Madsen cannon using marine mounts on a Finnish navy Nuoli-class fast gunboat.

=== Types ===
The four standard mountings produced by DISA, although they also used a number of locally designed mounts, were:

- Light Field Mount - Primary anti tank mount, could be folded up and stowed on a motorcycle sidecar
- Universal Mount - Dual purpose mount, fitted with wheels it could be towed by its crew.
- Mobile Anti-Aircraft Mount - Dedicated AA mount.
- Tri-axial Mount - Light weight mount intended for fortifications and naval use.

=== Self-propelled ===
- Landsverk L-60 - Light tanks made in Sweden by AB Landsverk and employed by:
  - Ireland - 2
- Landsverk Lynx - Armored cars made in Sweden by AB Landsverk and employed by:
  - Denmark - 3
- Landsverk L-180 - Armored Cars made in Sweden by AB Landsverk and employed by:
  - Denmark - 2 (Madsen 20mm M 1933)
  - Ireland - 8

== Users ==
- Argentina
- Belgium
- Brazil
- Bulgaria
- Republic of China
- Colombia
- Czechoslovakia
- Denmark
- Estonia
- Finland
- France
- Greece (evaluation only)
- Nazi Germany
- Hungary
- Ireland
- Iran
- Italy
- Norway
- Paraguay
- Poland (evaluation only)
- Portugal
- Spain
- Sweden
- Thailand
