= Finnish maritime cluster =

Cluster of Finnish companies in maritime industries

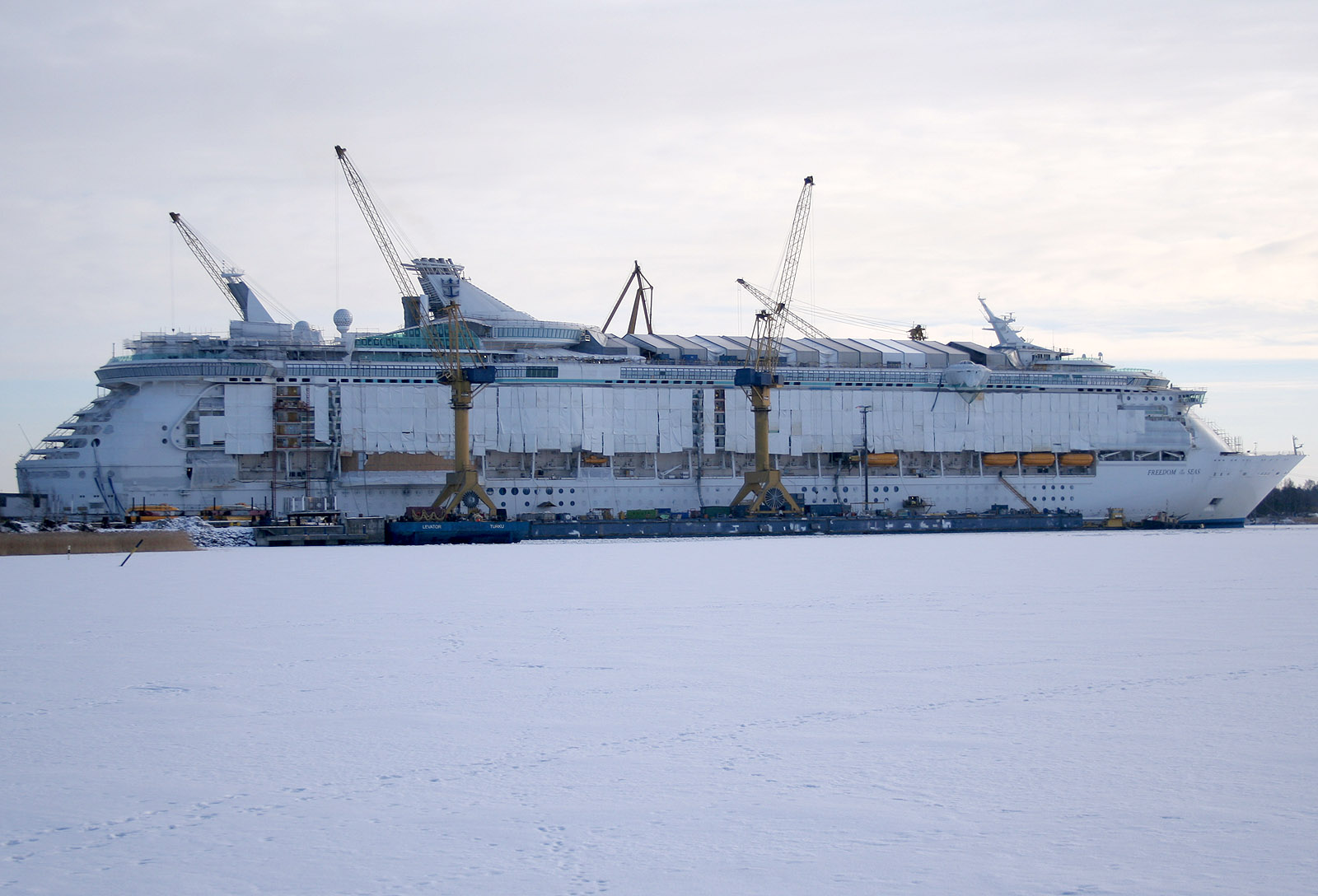
Freedom of the Seas under construction in February 2006, surrounded by sea ice

The Finnish maritime cluster is a cluster of Finnish companies in maritime industries. In 2016 the total turnover was estimated at 13 billion euros and it employed 48,000 people.

== History ==
Small trading ships similar to Jacobstads Wapen were built in Finnish coastal towns in the 18th century. Small-scale shipyards continued to exist well into the 20th century. The first large scale shipyard was the galley dry dock at Sveaborg built in the mid-18th century, which serviced the ships that won one of the largest sea battles in Finnish history.

The first industrial scale shipyard in Turku was established in 1732. After the Crimean War, William Crichton acquired a workshop and built a new shipyard, which later absorbed smaller shipyards and developed into Crichton-Vulcan and merged with Wärtsilä between 1936 and 1938. Germany outsourced a notable amount of submarine construction to Finland after World War I. This section of industry was later outlawed by the Paris Peace Treaty, but it became an important foundation for the Finnish maritime industry.

=== Soviet trade ===
A major boost to Finnish shipbuilding was the war reparations paid to the Soviet Union after World War II. They forced a rapid industrialization of Finland and the creation of a large metal industry in addition to the traditional papermaking and forest industries. By 1953, the shipbuilding industry had six times the capacity it did in 1944.

Bilateral trade with the Soviet Union forced Finnish shipyards to build ships with a high percentage of total value of Finnish origin. All major components of the finished products needed to be produced domestically. The high percentage of domestic components continues even after the dissolution of the Soviet Union and the end of the lucrative trade deals. While ships built in other European shipyards are a collection of components from around Europe and around the world, ships built in Finland can have up to 90% of their total value in Finnish components and labor (kotimaisuusaste).

== Major companies ==
=== Shipyards ===
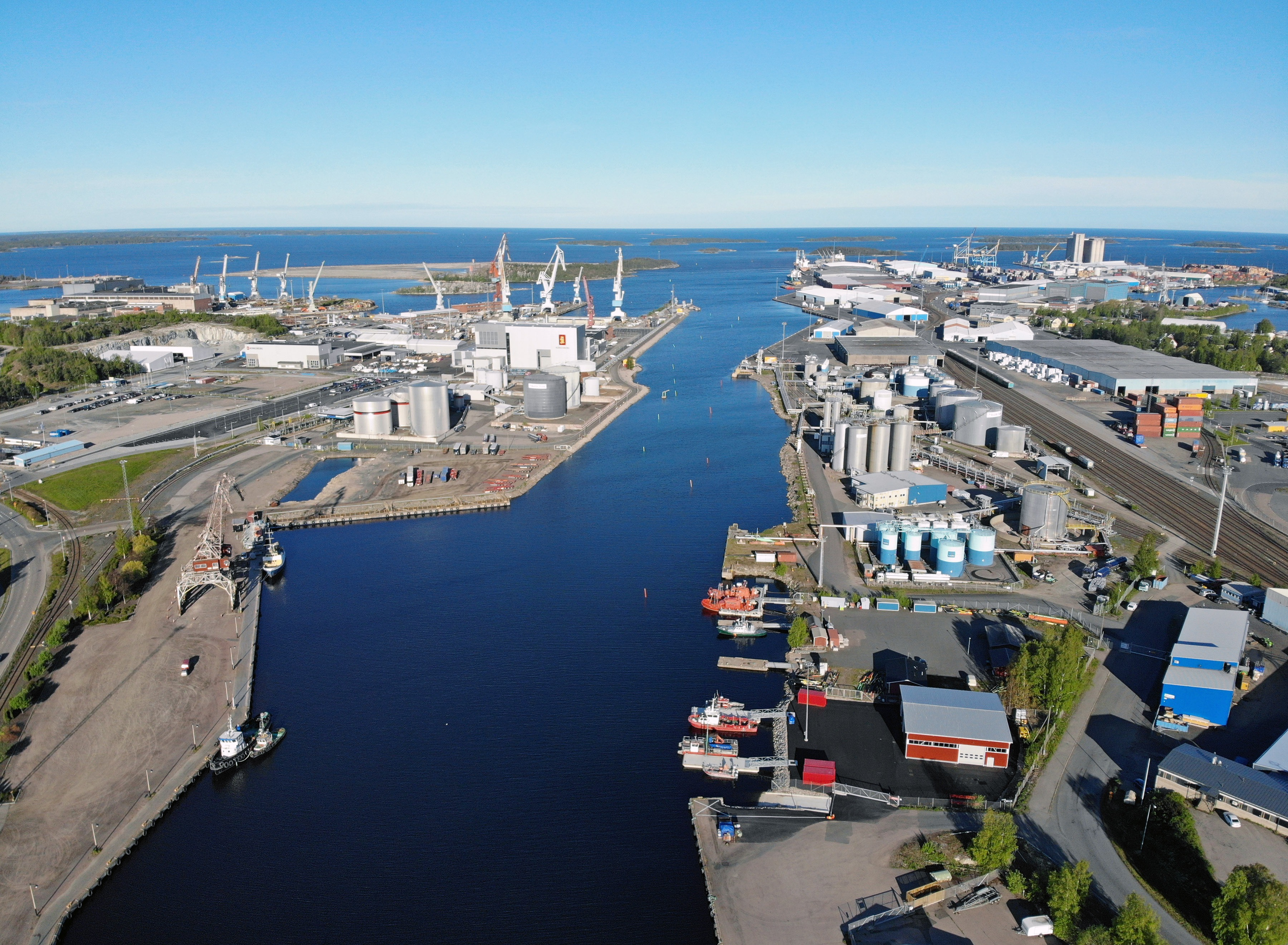
Former STX Finland, now Rauma Marine Constructions dockyard in Rauma, Finland, where Rolls-Royce plant is co-located.

- Helsinki Shipyard
- Meyer Turku
- Rauma Marine Constructions
- Uki Workboat

=== Design offices ===
- Bluetech Finland
- Deltamarin (part of China Merchants Group)
- Elomatic
- Foreship (part of RINA)
- ILS
- Railo Technology

=== Equipment manufacturers ===
- ABB, formerly Strömberg, producer of Azipod Azimuth thrusters and electrical systems
- Kone
  - Cargotec (Split from KONE in 2005, formerly Navire Cargo Gear and MacGregor) provides cargo-handling solutions
- Kongsberg; producer of Aquamaster (formerly Rolls-Royce) Z-drive azimuth thrusters
- Sanitec, a former subsidiary of Wärtsilä, provides closed loop sanitation systems
- Steerprop, Rauma, Azimuth Propulsors
- Wärtsilä provides maritime diesel engines

=== Other ===
- CADMATIC, ship design software
- NAPA, ship design software (part of ClassNK)

== Notable ships and vessels ==
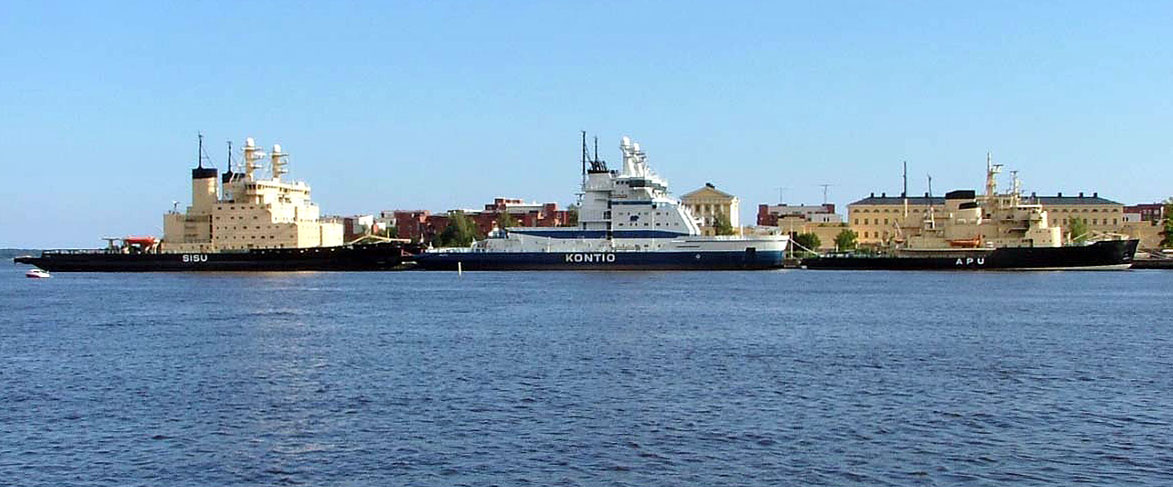
Six Finnish icebreakers docked for the summer season at Katajanokka, Helsinki

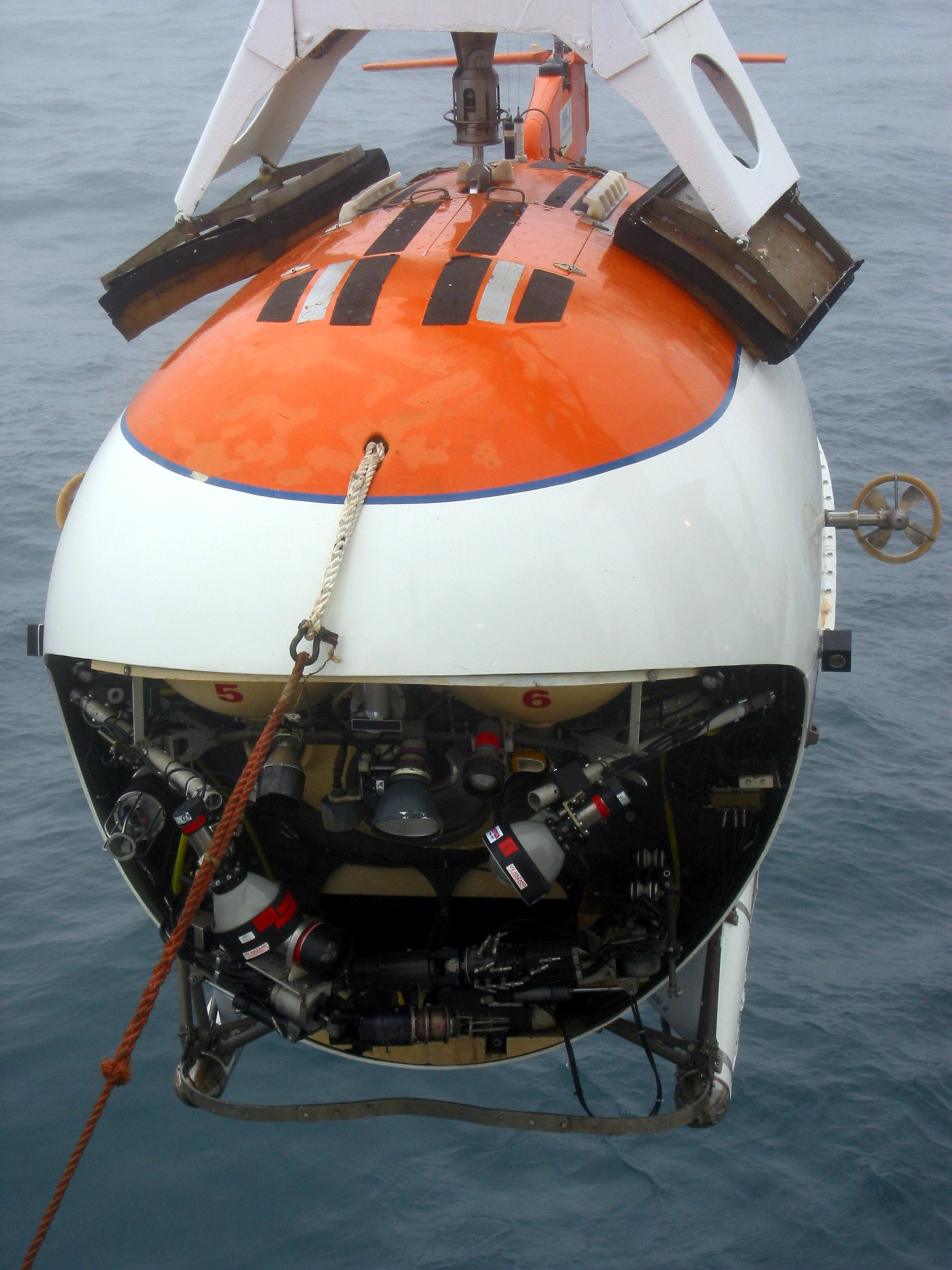
The Mir submersible

=== Icebreakers ===
- Sisu (1939)
- Voima (1954)
- Sampo (1960)
- Atle-class icebreakers (1974)
- Otso (1986) and Kontio (1987)
- Nuclear powered icebreakers
  - NS Taymyr (1989)
  - NS Vaygach (1990)
- Fennica (1993) and Nordica (1994)
- Polaris (2016)

=== Cruise ships ===
- Song of Norway (1970)
- Royal Princess (1984, 44,348 tons)
- Birka Princess (1986)
- Fantasy class (1990, 70,390 tons)
- Birka Queen (1992)
- Vision class (1996, 81,500 tons)
- Voyager class (1999, 142,000 tons)
- Spirit class (2001, 85,700 tons)
- Birka Paradise (2004)
- Freedom class (2006, 158,000 tons)
- Oasis class (2009, 220,000 tons), formerly known as "Project Genesis"
- Mein Schiff class (2014, 99,526 tons), total of 5 cruise ships has been built and 2 more will be built in the future.
- Excellence class (2019, 183,200 tons), total of 4 ships will be built.
- Icon class (2022, 200,000 tons); 1 built, 2 under construction and 1 more ordered (to be delivered 2025, 2026 and 2027), and options for 2 more, as of 2025.

=== Cruiseferries ===
- GTS Finnjet (1977)
- Turella (1979) and Rosella (1980)
- Viking Saga (1980) and Viking Song (1980)
- Finlandia (1980) and Silvia Regina (1981)
- Svea (1985) and Wellamo (1986)
- Mariella (1985) and Olympia (1986)
- Athena (1989) and Kalypso (1990)
- Cinderella (1989)
- Silja Serenade (1990) and Silja Symphony (1991)
- Romantika (2002) and Victoria I (2004)
- Color Fantasy (2004) and Color Magic (2007)
- Galaxy (2006) and Baltic Queen (2008)
- Viking XPRS (2008)
- Viking Grace (2013)

=== ROPAX ferries ===
- Finnhansa (1966)
- Ulysses (2001)
- SuperSpeed 1 (2008)
- Megastar (2017)
- Aurora Botnia (2021)

=== Navy ships ===
- Ilmarinen (1931) and Väinämöinen (1932), first battleships with a diesel-electric drive
- Turunmaa-class gunboats (1963)
- Pohjanmaa (1979)
- Helsinki-class missile boats (1981)
- Rauma-class missile boats (1990)
- Hämeenmaa-class minelayers (1992)
- Hamina-class missile boats (1998)
- Tuuli (2002)
- Louhi (2011)
- Jehu-class landing crafts (2012)
- Turva (2014)
- Pohjanmaa-class corvettes (planned)

=== Submarines ===
- Saukko (1930)
- Vetehinen-class submarines (1930)
- Vesikko (1934)
- Mir (1987)
