= Finnish submarine Vesikko =

Submarine museum ship

Coordinates: 60°08′33.1″N 024°59′22.5″E

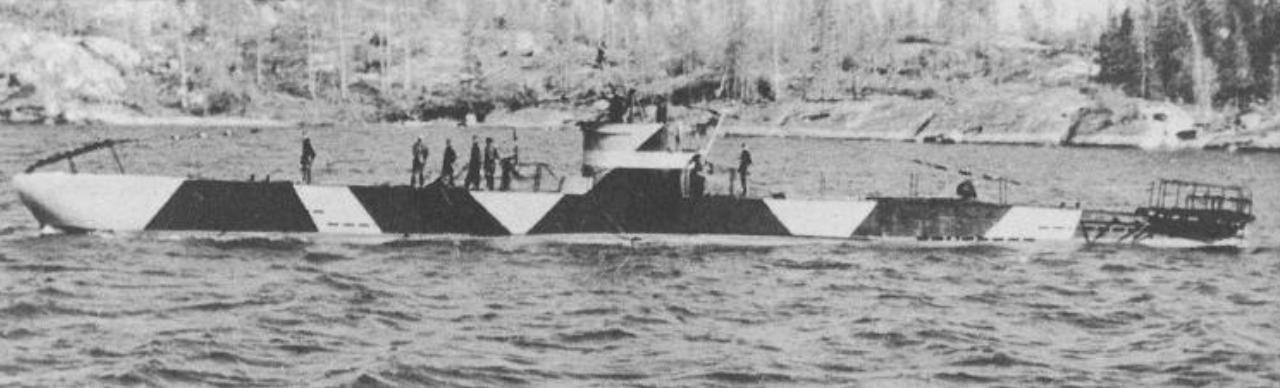

History

Finland
- Name: Vesikko
- Ordered: 9 October 1930
- Builder: Crichton-Vulcan, Turku, Finland
- Laid down: 7 March 1931
- Launched: 10 May 1933
- Commissioned: 30 April 1934
- In service: 19 January 1936
- Out of service: 1946
- Stricken: 1959
- Status: Museum ship

General characteristics
- Type: Coastal submarine
- Displacement: 254 t (250 long tons) surfaced; 303 t (298 long tons) submerged; 381 tonnes total,
- Length: 40.90 m (134 ft 2 in) o/a; 26.10 m (85 ft 8 in) pressure hull
- Beam: 4.076 m (13 ft 4.5 in); 4.026 m (13 ft 2.5 in) pressure hull
- Height: 8.18 m (26 ft 10 in)
- Draft: 3.79 m (12 ft 5 in)
- Propulsion: Diesel-electric, 2 diesel engines each 350 PS (257 kW; 345 bhp); 2 double-acting electric motors each 180 PS (132 kW; 178 shp)
- Speed: 13 knots (24 km/h; 15 mph) surfaced, 8 knots (15 km/h; 9.2 mph) submerged
- Range: 1,350 nmi (2,500 km; 1,550 mi) at 8 knots surfaced, 40 nmi (74 km; 46 mi) at 4 knots (7.4 km/h; 4.6 mph) submerged
- Test depth: 150 m
- Complement: 4 officers, 8 non-commissioned officers, 4 enlisted
- Sensors & processing systems: 2 × 6 Atlas Werke hydrophones, 1 receiver station (Gruppenhorchgerät)
- Armament: 3 × 53.3 cm (21 in) torpedo tubes in the bow; 5 torpedoes; 1 × 20 mm (0.79 in)/60 Madsen AA gun; 1 × 12.7 mm (1 in) machine gun

Vesikko is a submarine, which was launched on 10 May 1933 at the Crichton-Vulcan dock in Turku. Until 1936 it was named by its yard number CV 707. Vesikko was ordered by a Dutch engineering company Ingenieurskantoor voor Scheepsbouw (a German front company) in 1930 as a commercial submarine prototype, being the prototype for the German Type II submarines. Purchased by the Finnish before World War II, she saw service in the Winter War and Continuation War, sinking the Soviet merchant ship Vyborg as her only victory. After the cease-fire with the Allies in 1944, Vesikko was retired. Finland was banned from operating submarines after the war and she was kept in storage until she was turned into a museum ship.

Vesikko was one of five submarines to serve in the Finnish Navy. The other four were the three larger Vetehinen-class boats Vetehinen, Vesihiisi, Iku-Turso and the small Saukko. The word "vesikko" is the Finnish name for the European mink.

== Development and design ==
Ingenieurskantoor voor Scheepsbouw (IvS), was a German front company in the Netherlands, established to secretly design a new German submarine fleet. According to the terms of the Versailles Peace Treaty after World War I, Germany was banned from building and operating submarines among other "offensive" weaponry. This resulted in moving the armaments' research to foreign countries. For example, German tanks and aircraft were tested and developed in the Soviet Union. Therefore, unlike the other submarines in the Finnish Navy, Vesikko was not part of the Naval Act. Instead, it was part of the secret rebuilding of the German Navy, the Reichsmarine.

The objective of Germans was to design a modern submarine type to be used during general mobilization; technology and standards were to be new and not based on World War I designs. For this purpose two prototypes were built, E1 in Spain and CV 707 in Finland. The latter was later chosen as a first submarine type for the new fleet. Construction of both of these experimental submarines was funded by the Reichsmarine.

Commander Karl Bartenbach, who had retired from active service in the Reichsmarine, worked as secret liaison officer in Finland. His official title was Naval Expert of the Finnish Defence Forces, and it was under his leadership that the 496-ton Vetehinen class and the 100-ton Saukko were built in Finland. Both submarine types were designed by IvS. For the German Navy, his mission was to oversee the developing and construction of a 200–250 ton submarine, which would still equal the combat effectiveness of the Vetehinen class. The whole task was named The Lilliput Project.

The official decision allowing Vesikko to be constructed in Finland was made in 1930 after several meetings with the Finnish Government. Since The Liliput Project broke the terms of the Versailles Peace Treaty, there was no mention of Germany in the agreement, and it was decided that the new submarine could only be sold to nations belonging to the League of Nations. The would-be buyers also had to have the rights to own such a weapon. The Finnish Government gained primary rights to purchase the submarine.

The construction of CV 707 begun in 1931 at the Crichton-Vulcan dock in Turku. At the time of its construction, CV 707 was one of the most advanced submarine designs. For example, the maximum depth was over twice that of earlier German submarines, and its hull could be built completely by electric welding. By eliminating rivets there was increased resistance to water pressure, decreased oil leakages, and the construction process was faster. Germans tested CV 707 in the Archipelago of Turku during 1933–34.

Vesikko was a prototype for the German Type II submarines. Six Type IIA submarines (U-1 to U-6) which were almost identical to Vesikko were built in the Deutsche Werke dock in Kiel, and after these, 44 Type IIB, IIC, and IID submarines were built before and during World War II.

== Service history ==
According to the agreement between the Finnish Ministry of Defence and the Crichton-Vulcan company, Finland had the primary purchase option until 1937, and the Finnish Government took over the submarine during August 1934. After the Finnish Parliament had approved the acquisition in 1936, the submarine joined the Finnish Navy under the name of Vesikko.

=== Winter War ===
Vesikko was deployed with Vesihiisi to the Hanko region on 30 November 1939 as several Soviet surface combatants were headed towards the area. However the submarine failed to arrive in time to intercept the Kirov and its escorts. Vesikko was able to get close enough to see the cruiser but was unable to reach firing position as it had to evade shellfire.

When on 17 December and on two following days the Soviets sent the battleship Oktyabrskaya Revolyutsiya to bombard Finnish positions at Koivisto, the Finnish Navy decided to send out Vesikko to hunt for it. However, by the time the submarine reached the area a day later the Soviet battleship Marat which bombarded on that day had already departed and temperature had dropped to −15 °C (5 °F) which prevented the submarine from diving.

=== Continuation War ===
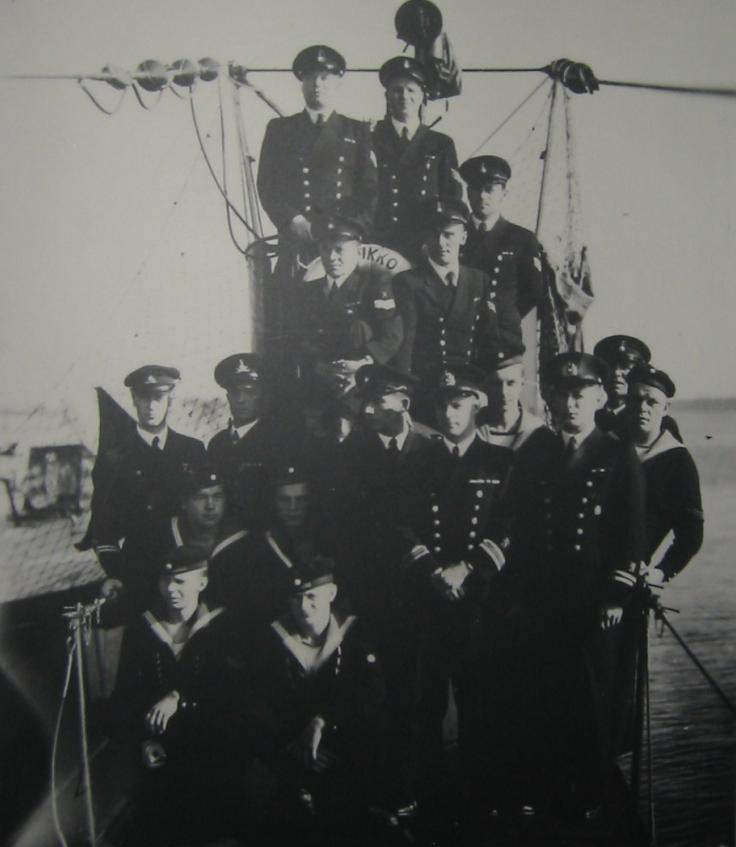
Crew of Vesikko (July 1941)

In summer 1941 all Finnish submarines were once again readied for combat operations and they sailed to the staging area in the Gulf of Finland. Vesikko's base of operations was to be Vahterpää island near the town of Loviisa. When the Continuation War started on 25 June, all submarines were ordered to patrol the eastern part of the Gulf of Finland. On 3 July 1941 Vesikko sank a Soviet merchant ship named Vyborg east of Gogland island. The attack was made 700 metres (770 yd) from the target; first one torpedo was launched at 13:25 which hit the stern of the target. The target stopped but did not appear to be sinking so Vesikko fired another torpedo which malfunctioned and turned right, missing Vyborg. Very soon after the strike, three Soviet patrol boats started to chase Vesikko and tried to destroy it with depth charges and assist the damaged ship but failed to accomplish either task. Vyborg sank on 3 July at 14:15.

Soviet historiography later downplayed the sinking of Vyborg, insisting that several submarines and German naval bombers had assaulted the ship simultaneously, and that over twenty torpedoes had been launched against it. During fall 1941 Vesikko operated from Helsinki and made three patrols to the coast of Estonia. In 1942, equipped with depth charge rack, she acted as an escort to convoys in the Sea of Åland, and hunted suspected hostile submarines near Helsinki.

In the beginning of June 1944, Vesikko escorted the convoys which were evacuating people from the Karelian Isthmus. Due to the armistice between Finland and the Soviet Union, Vesikko was ordered to return to port on 19 September 1944. Vesikko sailed the last time as a combat vessel of the Finnish Navy in December 1944.

During wartime, several officers were commanders of the submarine: Ltn. Kauko Pekkanen (1939), Capt. Ltn. Olavi Aittola (1940 and 1941), Capt. Ltn. Antti Leino (1942), Capt. Ltn. Pentti Airaksinen (1942), Capt. Ltn. Eero Pakkala (1943), Capt. Ltn. Olavi Syrjänen (1943), and Capt. Ltn. Lauri Parma (1944).

=== Museum ship ===
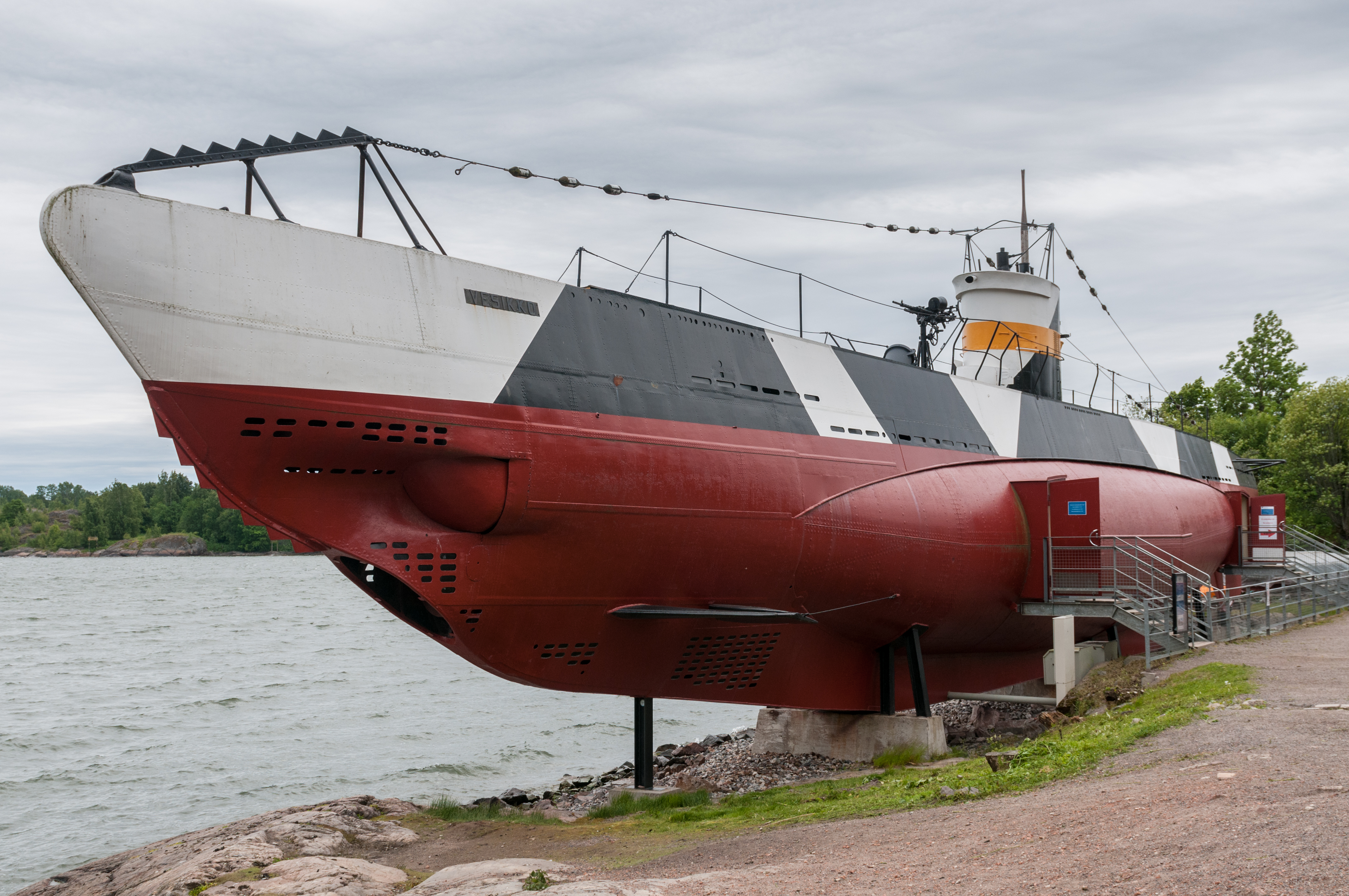
A view of the submarine as of 2017.

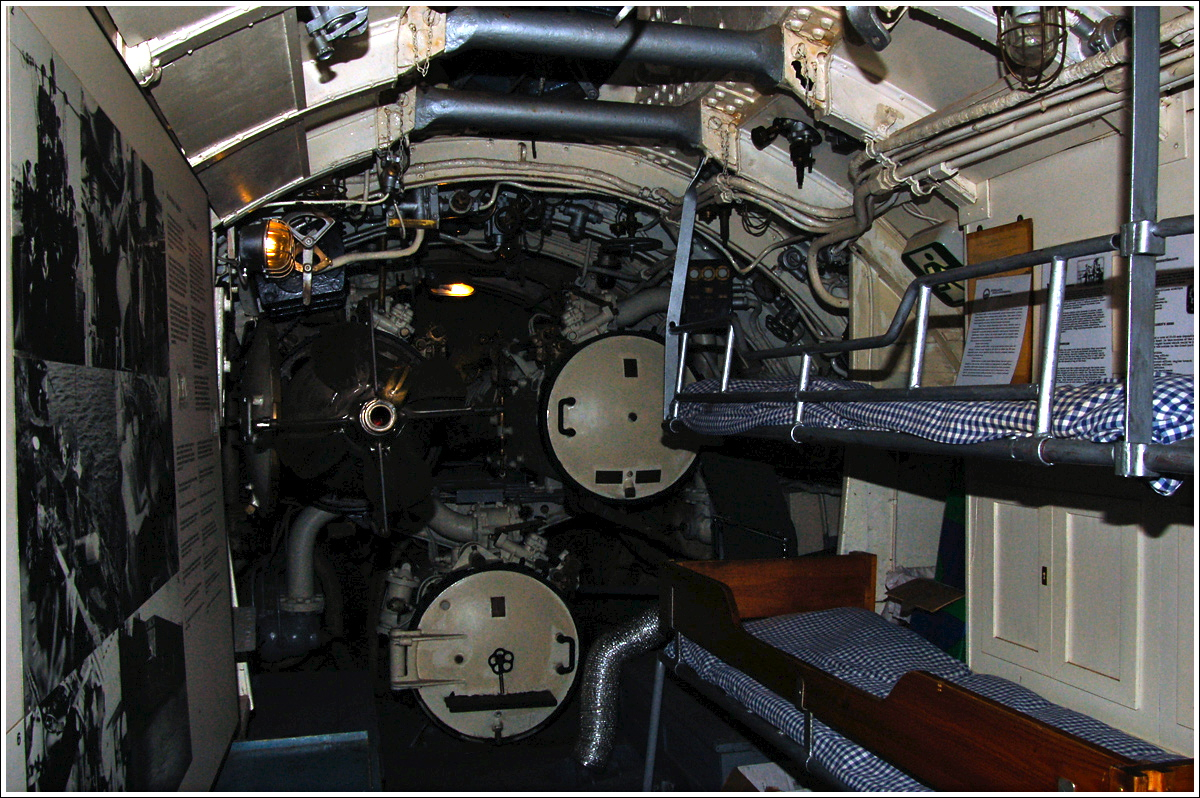
Inside Vesikko in the torpedo room.

In January 1945, the Allies' Commission responsible for monitoring the observance of the Peace treaty ordered the Finnish submarines to be disarmed, and in 1947 according to the terms of the Paris Peace Treaty, the Finnish Defence Forces were forbidden to have any submarines. The Finnish submarines Vetehinen, Vesihiisi, Iku-Turso, and Saukko were sold to Belgium to be scrapped in 1953. Vesikko was spared because the Finnish Defence Forces hoped that Finland could in future gain permission to use submarines again, and Vesikko was then meant to be used for training purposes. Vesikko was stored at the Valmet Oy dock in Katajanokka district in Helsinki.

In 1959, the Finnish Navy decided to sell Vesikko because Finland had not managed to obtain the right to use submarines again, and because Valmet Oy complained that the old submarine hampered the work in the dock. Thanks to the Institute of Military History and the former submarine officers, the sale was cancelled and Vesikko was conveyed to the Military Museum.

The Military Museum moved Vesikko to Susisaari island in Suomenlinna, on the shores of Artillery Bay, and restored the submarine. The restoration process lasted over a decade and was very difficult; most of the equipment had been removed after the war and put to other use. In addition, Vesikko had been subject to vandalism in the dock. However, with donations and voluntary work, the restoration was completed, and Vesikko opened as a museum on the anniversary of the Finnish Navy, 9 July 1973.

== See also ==
- List of submarine museums
- List of submarine classes

== Bibliography ==
- Atkinson, Krispen (August 2021). Osborne, Richard (ed.). "Finnish Submarine Vesikko". Warships: Marine News Supplement. 75 (8): 399–401. ISSN 0966-6958.
- Rössler, Eberhard (1999). Uboottyp II. Die "Einbäume". Vom Original zum Modell (in German). Bonn: Bernard & Graefe. ISBN 3-7637-6023-7.
