= Vetehinen =

Vetehinen may refer to:

- Vetehinen (fi), water spirit in Karelian-Finnish folklore, cognate to Slavic Vodyanoy or Germanic Nixie
- Vetehinen-class submarine, Finnish submarine class
  - Finnish submarine Vetehinen, Finnish submarine
