= TCG Ikinci İnönü =

TCG Ikinci İnönü ("Second Inonu") sometimes written as II. İnönü, is the name of several Turkish submarines, named in commemoration of the Turkish victory at the Second Battle of İnönü in April 1921

It can refer to:

- TCG Ikinci İnönü (1928), built at Fijenoord, acquired 1928, decommissioned 1948
- TCG Ikinci İnönü (S331), ex USS Blueback (S-326), an un-modified Balao-class submarine acquired 1948, decommissioned 1973
- TCG Ikinci İnönü (S333), ex USS Corporal (S-346), a Balao-class GUPPY III submarine acquired 1974, decommissioned 1996

== See also ==
- TCG Birinci İnönü
