= TCG Birinci İnönü =

TCG Birinci İnönü ("First Inonu") sometimes written as I. İnönü, is the name of several Turkish submarines, named in commemoration of the Turkish victory at the First Battle of İnönü in January 1921

It can refer to:

- TCG Birinci İnönü (1928), built in NL Wilton-Fijenoord launched Jan 29 1927, comm. June 9, 1928 decommissioned 1948
- TCG Birinci İnönü (S330), ex USS Brill (S-330), an un-modified Balao-class submarine acquired 1948, decommissioned 1972
- TCG Birinci İnönü (S346), ex USS Threadfin (S-410), a Balao-class GUPPY IIA submarine acquired 1972, decommissioned 1998
- TCG Birinci İnönü (S360), a Gür-class submarine built in 2007

== See also ==
- TCG Ikinci İnönü
