= Finnish submarine Iku-Turso =

Finnish submarine

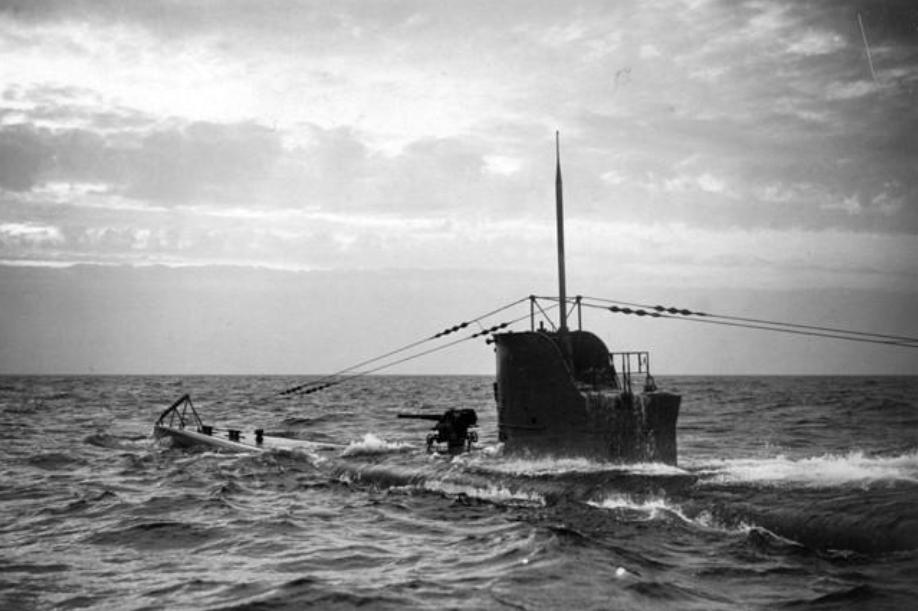

History

Finland
- Name: Iku-Turso
- Ordered: 4 March 1927
- Builder: Crichton-Vulcan, Turku, Finland
- Laid down: 1927
- Launched: 5 May 1931
- Commissioned: 13 October 1931
- Decommissioned: 1946
- Fate: Scrapped 1950s

General characteristics
- Class & type: Vetehinen-class submarine
- Displacement: 493 tonnes surfaced, 716 tonnes submerged
- Length: 63.5 m (208.3 ft)
- Beam: 6.2 m (20.3 ft)
- Draft: 3.6 m (11.8 ft)
- Propulsion: Diesel-electric, 1,016 hp
- Speed: 12.6 knots (23.3 km/h; 14.5 mph) surfaced, 8.5 knots (15.7 km/h; 9.8 mph) submerged
- Range: 1,575 nmi (2,917 km; 1,812 mi) at 10 knots (19 km/h; 12 mph) surfaced, 75 nmi (139 km; 86 mi) at 4 knots (7.4 km/h; 4.6 mph) submerged
- Complement: 30 men
- Armament: 4 × 533 mm torpedo tubes, 2 bow, 2 stern (6 torpedoes); 20 mines in vertical shafts; 1 × 76 mm/48 Bofors; 1 × 20 mm/60 Madsen; 1 × 12.7 mm; Added in 1942: Depth charge rack (4 depth charges)

Iku-Turso was a 500-tonne Vetehinen-class submarine that served in the Finnish Navy during the Second World War. It was launched in May 1931 and was named after a mythological Finnish sea monster, Iku-Turso. It was built by the Crichton-Vulcan shipyard in Turku according to a project developed by NV Ingenieurskantoor voor Scheepsbouw, "IvS", and was scrapped in 1953.

== Combat history ==
=== Winter War ===
On 7 December Iku-Turso was sortied to intercept the Soviet freighter Ivan Papanin sailing from Stockholm. The submarine was informed of the departure time of the target and the likely route and so Iku-Turso patrolled in the international waters off Sandhamn and Svenska Högarne during the night. Unidentified patrol boats harassed the submarine and forced it to dive and by the time Iku-Turso was able to reach periscope depth there were no freighters in sight. Ivan Papanin had passed the area few hours earlier and likely having been warned of the presence of the Finnish submarine, it had altered its course to evade Iku-Turso.

In late December 1941 Iku-Turso patrolled for a couple of days off Liepāja but did not encounter any targets the rules of engagements would have allowed the submarine to attack. In January 1941 Iku-Turso patrolled four days off Saaremaa and Hiiumaa but without any luck.

=== Continuation War ===
On 22 June 1941 Iku-Turso laid 20 mines north of the island of Mohni/Ekholm. A further 20 mines were laid at Ruuskeri SE from Gogland on 24 June and 18 mines to south of Vaindloo on 26 June after which further minelaying operations were postponed. Iku-Turso laid 18 already loaded mines on 11 July of the coast of Estonia east of Mohni.

On 30 July Iku-Turso along with Vetehinen were sortied to intercept a Soviet convoy moving to and from the besieged base of Hanko. The submarines saw the convoy but were unable to maneuver to attack position.

In December 1941, after the Soviets had evacuated Hanko, Iku-Turso was docked for the winter. Though Iku-Turso had not had much chance of using its torpedoes, the experiences from other Finnish subs were that the Italian torpedoes used (Finnish designation T/40) were unreliable. During 1942, Iku-Turso was upgraded with new 12-hydrophone listening arrays and equipped with a depth charge rack capable of carrying 4 depth charges. The submarine was further modified by streamlining the tower and moving the 20 mm gun up to the tower.

On 27 October 1942, after unsuccessfully attacking a Soviet Shchuka-class submarine with the 20 mm Madsen cannon in poor visibility, Iku-Turso later came across and torpedoed another Soviet Shchuka-class submarine. After the torpedo impacted, the target disappeared. On the impact site, the Finnish submarine located a large oil spill with even more oil still rising to the surface. The sunken submarine's identity has later been contested as several Soviet submarines of Shchuka class were lost at that time in the area but the most likely candidates are either Shch-320 or perhaps even more likely Shch-308 as some Russian sources claim that Shch-320 had been sunk by a mine earlier that month and that the initial unsuccessful attack by Iku-Turso had been against Shch-307.

On 30 July 1944 Iku-Turso attempted to attack a convoy targeting a tug but failed to reach firing position. On 24 August 1944 Iku-Turso ran into an obstacle — apparently an anti-submarine net - but was able to get loose. A mine which had been attached to the obstacle exploded but caused only light damage to the submarine.
