= NV Ingenieurskantoor voor Scheepsbouw =

Dutch dummy company funded by the Reichsmarine after World War 1

Ingenieurskantoor voor Scheepsbouw
- Company type: Naamloze vennootschap
- Industry: Shipbuilding
- Founded: 21 July 1922
- Defunct: 1945
- Fate: Dissolved after World War II
- Headquarters: Kiel (1922-1925); The Hague (1925-1945)
- Key people: Hans Techel
- Products: Warships
- Parent: AG Vulcan, Germaniawerft and AG Weser

NV Ingenieurskantoor voor Scheepsbouw (Dutch: engineer-office for shipbuilding), usually contracted to IvS or Inkavos, was a Dutch dummy company set up in The Hague and funded by the Reichsmarine after World War I in order to maintain and develop German submarine know-how and to circumvent the limitations set by the Treaty of Versailles. The company designed several submarine types for paying countries, including the Soviet S-class submarine, as well as the prototypes for the German Type II submarines and Type VII submarines.

The company was a joint venture by the German shipyards AG Vulcan Stettin (located in Stettin and Hamburg), the Krupp-owned Germaniawerft in Kiel, and AG Weser in Bremen. Design work was carried out at the facilities of these companies in Germany.

== Background information ==
At the time of IvS, the Germans were bound by the Treaty of Versailles, signed in 1919. This treaty, among other terms, demanded that all German U-boats be destroyed or given to other nations. Thus the Reichsmarine was left without a submarine capability, and IvS was created to work around these restrictions. The work of the company was a major factor in the foundation of the Kriegsmarine of World War II.

== History ==
NV Ingenieurskantoor voor Scheepsbouw (IvS) was founded on 21 July 1922 and initially was led from the Germaniawerft in Kiel, Germany. During this time the company gradually built up a team of skilled and experienced German and Dutch engineers that were led by technical director Hans Techel, the former director of U-boat design at Germaniawerft. In 1925, after resolving their legal technicalities with the Dutch government, IvS finally opened its office in The Hague and the eleven-man staff that were leading the firm from the office in Kiel moved to the Dutch office. This office at the corner of the Wagenstraat and Gedempte burgwal would be used by IvS till its dissolution in 1945.

At first IvS used the old UB III and UC III boats of the Imperial German Navy as starting point for their new submarine designs.

== Naval designs and sales ==
=== Submarines ===
==== Turkey ====
IvS first designed two submarines based on the World War I UB III submarine of the Kaiserliche Marine. Both were built by the Fijenoord shipyard in Rotterdam in 1927 and sold to Turkey, where they formed the Birinci İnönü class. They were followed by the Submarino E-1 built in 1930 by the Echevarrieta y Larrinaga shipyard in Cádiz, Spain, initially for the Spanish Navy, but mainly as a prototype of the German Type I submarine and Type VII submarine. However, the Spanish lost interest in the E-1, and it was also sold to Turkey in 1935 as the TCG Gür. In 1936 it was reported in the media that there had been negotiations between Turkey, IvS and Dutch shipyards about a potential order for another four submarines, however, due financial concerns it came to nothing.

==== Soviet Union ====
The E-1 also attracted the attention of the Soviet Navy; with significant modifications the E-1 became the E-2 project. Construction of the first two prototypes started in December 1934 at the Baltic Shipyard in Leningrad, using German diesel engines and electric batteries. They were followed by the third prototype in April 1935. With further modifications to use less-expensive Soviet equipment, full production began in 1936 of the Soviet S-class submarines. In 1945 the Soviet submarine S-13 was responsible for the sinking of the German military transport Wilhelm Gustloff and the General von Steuben with heavy losses of life.

==== Finland ====
From 1927 to 1933 four IvS-designed submarines were built by Crichton-Vulcan Oy in Turku, Finland. One of these, CV 707 (later the Finnish Navy Vesikko), was the prototype of the German Type II submarine, while three larger Vetehinen-class submarines served as the prototypes for the Type VII. A fifth IvS design was the small submarine Saukko, built in Helsinki by the Sandvikens Skeppsdocka och Mekaniska Verkstad shipyard, and originally planned to be deployed in Lake Ladoga.

The contracts were worded in such a way that IvS employees (many of whom were former Kaiserliche Marine and Reichsmarine personnel) were involved with crew training and selection, and were also allowed to take part in submarine service trials. The Germans - who were, at the time, tightly restricted from using submarines themselves - thus gained first-hand knowledge of how their prototypes worked in practice.

=== Coastal defense ships ===
The company also designed the Finnish Navy coastal defense ships Väinämöinen and Ilmarinen in the late 1920s. Both ships were also built by Crichton-Vulcan Oy, entering service in 1932 and 1934, respectively.

=== Battlecruisers ===
The IvS was also involved in designing plans for a Royal Netherlands Navy project to build battlecruisers. Battlecruisers were deemed by some to be essential for the defense of the Dutch East Indies against possible Japanese expansion, especially as the Netherlands lacked any large surface ships. The designs were heavily influenced by the German Scharnhorst class and the final design was similar to the IvS design, because the Germans were expected to at least furnish the gun turrets for these ships, as constructing them was beyond Dutch capabilities. In the end, political disagreements delayed the decision-making process and none of the projected ships were laid down, as on May 10, 1940 the Germans invaded the Netherlands.

== Later projects ==
In 1933, the Reichsmarine established a training school in Kiel for U-boat crews, called the Unterseebootsabwehrschule ("Submarine Defence School"). This program provided for a small fleet of eight 500-tonne submarines, later doubled to sixteen.

Later plans for an actual U-boat fleet included designs for submarines referred to as "Experimental Motor Boats". Deutsche Werke in Kiel was selected to build the new submarines, and a new U-boat base was to be built at Kiel-Dietrichsdorf. Submarine components were gathered there surreptitiously, in preparation for the order to begin production. The following submarine types were initially planned:

- 1934 – two large (800-tonne) and two small (250-tonne) U-boats.
- 1935 – four small U-boats.
- 1936 – two large and six small U-boats.
- 1937 – two large and six small U-boats.

From then on more boats were built, leading up to wartime production.
