= Finnish submarine Vesihiisi =

Finnish marine vessel

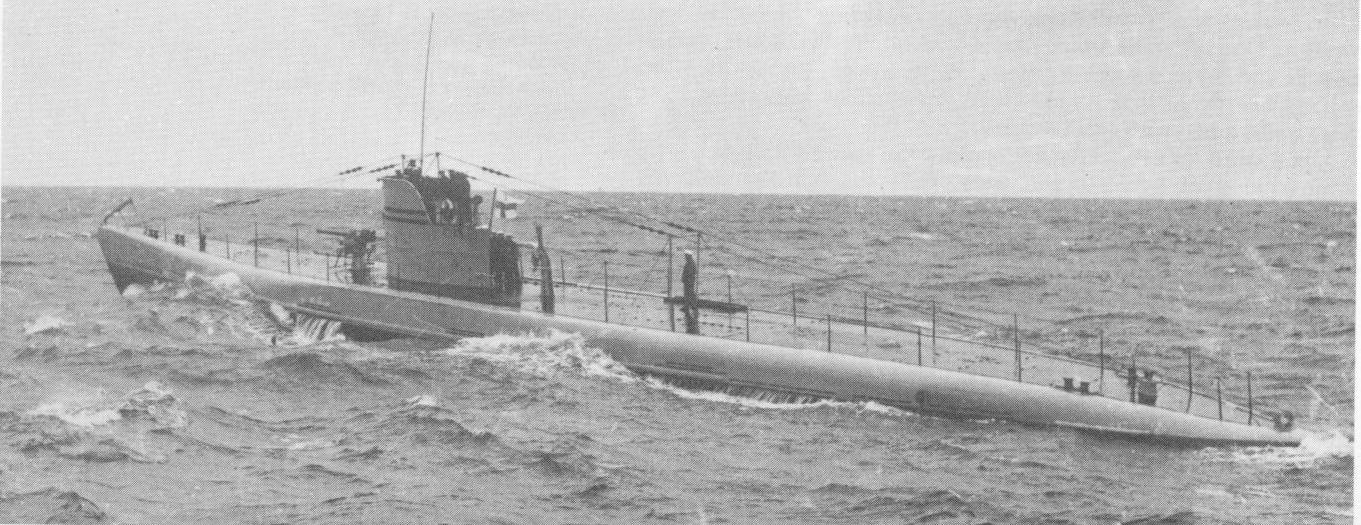

History

Finland
- Name: Vesihiisi
- Ordered: 4 March 1927
- Builder: Crichton-Vulcan, Turku, Finland
- Laid down: 1927
- Launched: 1 August 1930
- Commissioned: 2 December 1931
- Decommissioned: 1946
- Fate: Scrapped 1950s

General characteristics
- Class & type: Vetehinen-class submarine
- Displacement: 493 tonnes surfaced, 716 tonnes submerged
- Length: 63.5 m (208.3 ft)
- Beam: 6.2 m (20.3 ft)
- Draft: 3.6 m (11.8 ft)
- Propulsion: Diesel-electric, 1,016 hp (758 kW)
- Speed: 12.6 knots (23.3 km/h; 14.5 mph) surfaced; 8.5 knots (15.7 km/h; 9.8 mph) submerged
- Range: 1,575 nautical miles (2,917 km; 1,812 mi) at 10 knots (19 km/h; 12 mph) surfaced; 75 nautical miles (139 km; 86 mi) at 4 knots (7.4 km/h; 4.6 mph) submerged
- Complement: 30 men
- Armament: 4 × 533 mm (21 in) torpedo tubes, 2 bow, 2 stern (6 torpedoes); 20 mines in vertical shafts; 1 × 76 mm/48 Bofors; 1 × 20 mm/60 Madsen; 1 × 12.7 mm; Added in 1942: Depth charge rack (4 depth charges)

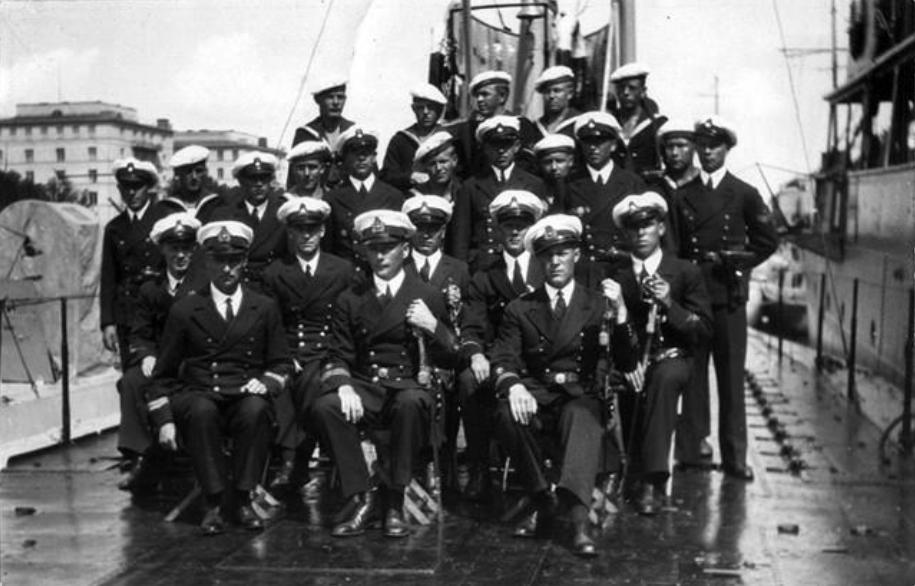
First crew of the submarine Vesihiisi, 1931.

Vesihiisi was a Finnish 500-tonne Vetehinen-class submarine that was constructed in the early 1930s. The vessel served in the Finnish Navy during the second World War. The name Vesihiisi refers to a mythological Finnish sea creature similar to a Siren.

== German design Iku-Turso, Vesihiisi, Vetehinen ==
While preparing the design of the Saukko, the Germans also prepared a design for a seagoing submarine for the Finnish Navy. Three submarines were built to this design, and like Saukko, they were fitted for mine-laying, the mines being supplied by the Germans. Being designed for use against Soviet bases (never very far from the Finnish bases), the radius of action was not of prime importance to this design, and only 20 tons of fuel oil were carried (as opposed to the 67 tons carried by the German Type VIIa based on this design.

== Combat operations ==
=== Winter War ===
Vesihiisi was alerted with Vesikko to the Hanko region on 30 November 1939 as several Soviet surface combatants were headed towards the area. The submarines however failed to reach the area in time to intercept the Kirov and its escorts.

Vesihiisi ran aground in early December 1941 and had to be docked for a few days for repairs. On 27 December Vesihiisi laid 16 mines off the Soviet naval station of Paldiski but soon after the ice forced the submarine to stay in port.

=== Continuation War ===
Vesihiisi commenced operations during the Continuation War on 22 June by laying 20 mines in Estonian waters (controlled at the time by the Soviet Union). She laid 18 more mines on 24 June at Ruuskeri south-southwest of Suursaari Island (Gogland) and further 18 mines on 26 June southeast of Tytärsaari (Bolshoy Tyuters). After this the mining operation was postponed and Vesihiisi laid the 18 already loaded mines finally on 2 August east of Osmussaar.

On 2 July 1941 Vesihiisi, while patrolling east of Suursaari (Gogland) encountered an escorted freighter heading east. A torpedo attack failed and the submarine suffered light damage from the escort's depth charges.

On 5 August 1941 Vesihiisi attacked a convoy transporting supplies to the besieged Soviet garrison at Hanko. According to Finnish sources, the convoy consisted of a transport vessel of the Molotov class (Iosif Stalin-class passenger ship) escorted by pair of large minesweepers and a group of patrol boats. According to Soviet sources, there were only four minor ships: the 489-ton freighter Hilde, built in 1894, one T58-class minesweeper, and two MO-class patrol boats. The submarine penetrated the escort screen and launched two torpedoes at a range of 700 metres (770 yd) while sailing between the target and the escorts. Neither of the torpedoes exploded and the escorts forced Vesihiisi to dive to the depth of 75 metres (246 ft). Though the submarine did not suffer severe damage from the depth charges, the repairs in the dock lasted for a week.

In December 1941 after the Soviets had evacuated Hanko the Finnish submarines were docked for the winter. During the sailing season of 1941 the Italian torpedoes Vesihiisi used (Finnish designation T/40) proved to be unreliable. During 1942 Vesihiisi was upgraded with new 12-hydrophone listening arrays and equipped with a depth charge rack capable of carrying 4 depth charges. The submarine was further modified by streamlining the tower and moving the 20 mm gun up to the tower.

On 9 August 1942, Vesihiisi was deployed along with her two sister ships to Mariehamn. Their mission was to conduct anti-submarine and escort operations in the Sea of Åland. In the evening of 21 October 1942 she torpedoed and sank the Soviet S-class submarine S-7, near Lågskär in the Sea of Åland. The captain (Sergei Lisin) and three of the crew of S-7; all of whom had been in the submarine's tower, were then captured (a fourth crewman drowned before he could be rescued).

On 4 July 1944 Vesihiisi laid 20 mines between Moshchny Island (Lavansaari) and Seskar (Seiskari). The boat was attacked with depth charges by two Soviet minesweepers but was able to escape without any damage. The submarine laid a further 18 mines north of Moshchny Island on 6 July 1944.
