= Crichton-Vulcan =

Abandoned shipyard in Turku, Finland

Coordinates: 60.4345°N 22.2334°E

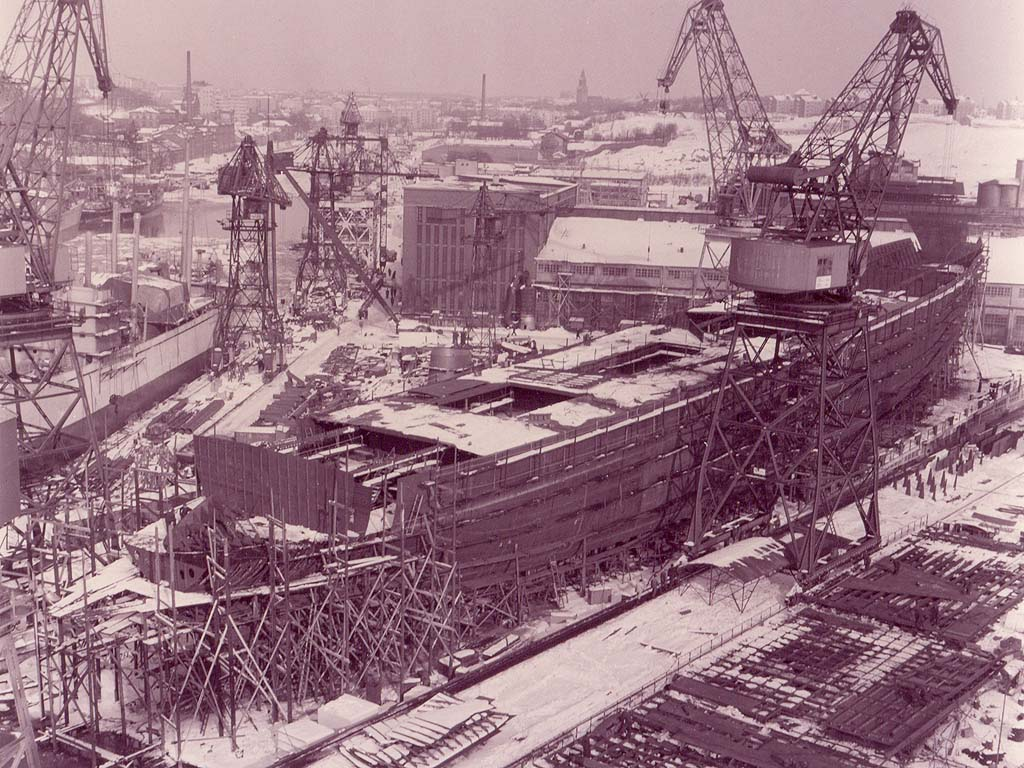
Wärtsilä Crichton-Vulcan east side premises in 1958.

Crichton-Vulcan is an abandoned shipyard in Turku, Finland, that once formed the cornerstone of the Finnish shipbuilding industry. The shipyard is best known for the World War II coastal defence ships and submarines it produced.

Shipbuilding at the yard gradually ended after 1976, after a new shipyard had been built in the suburb of Perno. The old yard was taken over by Turku Repair Yard and used for ship repair until 2004, when they too moved to the nearby city of Naantali. The shipyard by the Aura River in Turku then lay abandoned for some time and was the target of vandalism. However, the site is currently being turned into an upper-class residential area. Demolition of the old buildings began in June 2011.

== History ==
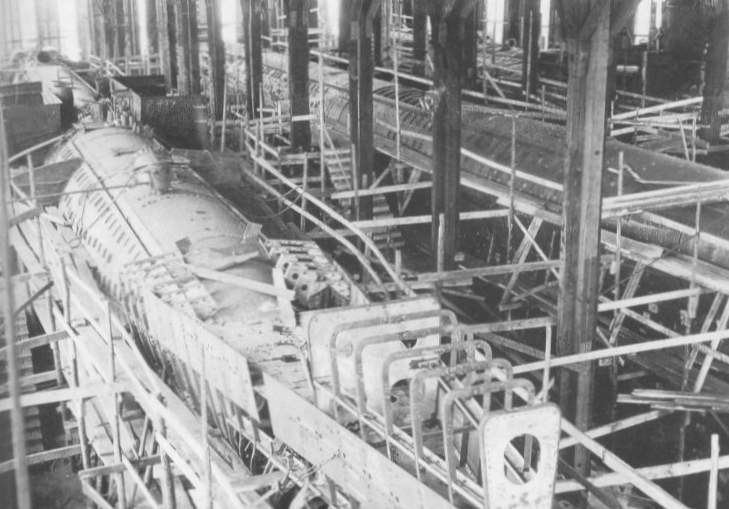
The three Vetehinen-class submarines side by side in the specially built construction hall

The first shipyard in Turku was established in 1732 on the eastern bank of the Aura River. The first foundry and metal workshop was established in 1842. After the Crimean War the workshop was acquired by Scotsman William Crichton. Crichton built a new shipyard near the mouth of Aura. Soon a joint-stock company, W:m Crichton & C:o Ab was established, merging smaller shipyards. In 1913 W:m Crichton & C:o Ab went bankrupt, and a new company Ab Crichton was established in its place.

Åbo mekaniska verkstads Ab was founded in 1874 and discontinued at the late 1890s. Ab Vulcan was started in 1898 to continue the operations. In 1924 the manager of Vulcan Allan Staffans organised a merger between the two companies creating Crichton-Vulcan Oy. It again was merged with Wärtsilä between 1936 and 1938. Wärtsilä bought the neighbouring boat and engine builder Andros in 1939 and joined it to Crichton-Vulcan. In 1966 the name of the shipyard was changed to Oy Wärtsilä Ab Turun telakka.

== Naval ships ==
During World War I, the shipyard served the Imperial Russian Navy. After Finnish independence in 1917, Finland started a program on naval armament. Most of the ships were designed by the Dutch (German) company Ingenieurskantoor voor Scheepsbouw and built by Crichton-Vulcan.

The shipyard built two coastal defence ships for the Finnish Navy. The 3,900-metric-ton (3,800-long-ton) (displacement) Ilmarinen and Väinämöinen were ordered in 1927 and delivered in 1931 and 1932, respectively.

=== Submarines ===
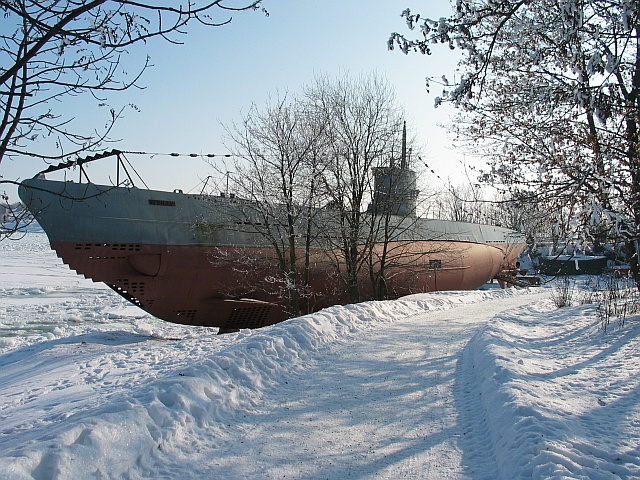
Vesikko, the only Type II submarine left, is on display in Suomenlinna, Helsinki.

The shipyard also built the prototypes for the World War II German U-boat fleet. Germany was banned under the Treaty of Versailles from building submarines, so work was conducted under foreign dummy companies. Three 716-metric-ton (705-long-ton) submarines were ordered in 1927. The submarines were designed by Ingenieurskantoor voor Scheepsbouw; the design was based on the World War I German Type UB III submarine. The design work and the supervision of the construction was done by Germans. The submarines would serve as a step in the design of the German Type VIIA submarines.

The Vetehinen, the Vesihiisi and the Iku-Turso were commissioned in 1930 and 1931.

A smaller sub, the 250-metric-ton (250-long-ton) Vesikko, was launched in 1933. It too was designed by Ingenieurskantoor voor Scheepsbouw, and was the direct prototype of the German Type II submarine.

== Successors ==
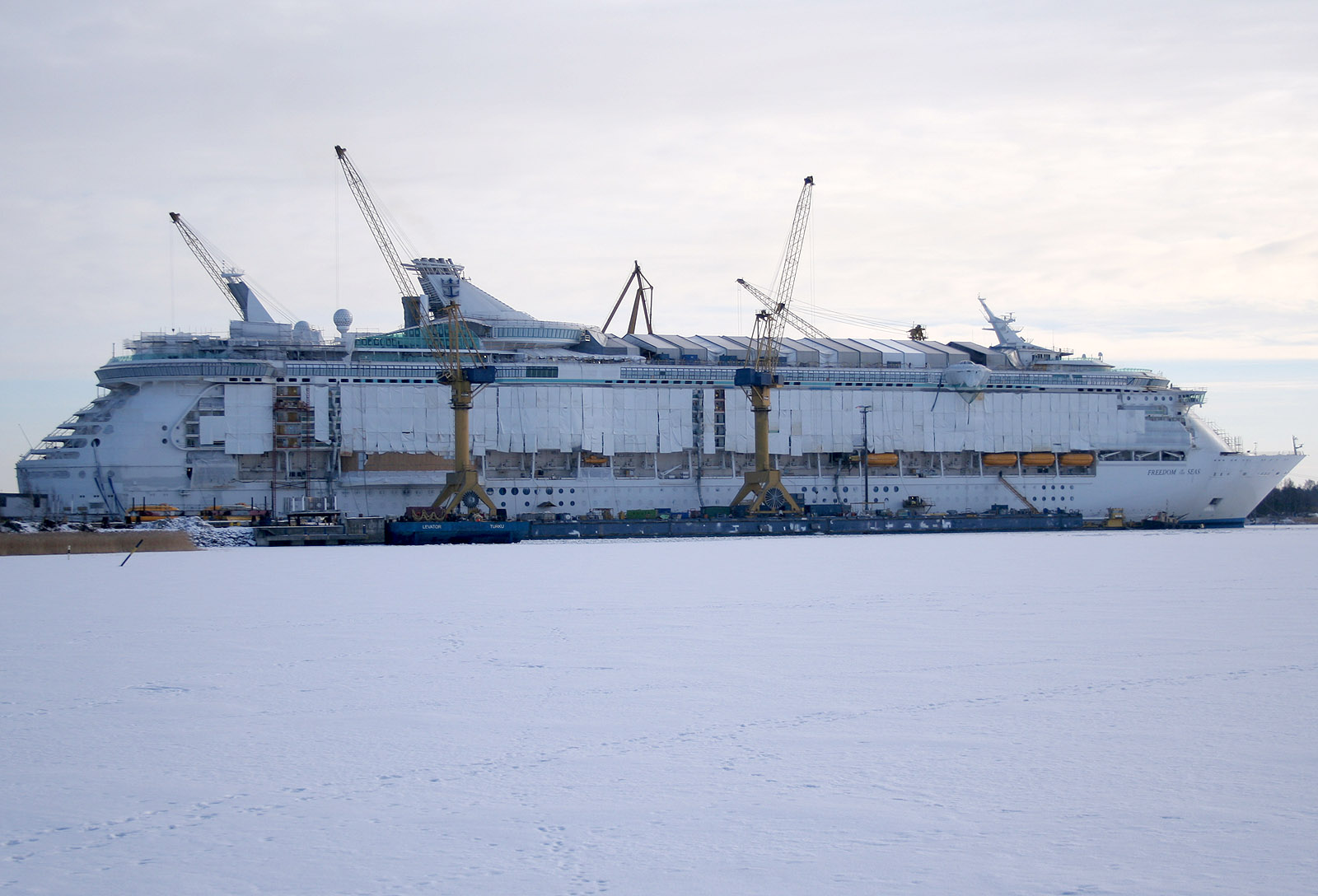
The 339 m (1,112 ft) long Freedom of the Seas under construction in Perno, 8 km (5.0 mi) from the old shipyard

In the mid-1970s, Wärtsilä built a new, larger shipyard in Perno, 8 kilometers (5.0 mi) from the center of Turku. This new shipyard is now operated by Meyer Turku and produces the world's largest cruise ships, the Freedom class and the Oasis class. After 1983 the old shipyard concentrated solely on ship repair; the last newbuilding entirely built at the old shipyard was MS Rosella, launched in 1979, but until spring 1983 the old shipyard continued to complete ships that were launched at the new yard and then towed to the old yard.

In 1986 Wärtsilä's shipbuilding branch merged with the shipyards of the state-owned Valmet, taking over the Vuosaari shipyard in Helsinki. In 1989 the new company, Wärtsilä Marine, went bankrupt.

A new company, Masa-Yards (now STX Europe), headed by yard manager Martin Saarikangas, took over the new shipyard in Turku and Wärtsilä's Helsinki New Shipyard.

Another new company, Turku Repair Yard, was established to take over the old repair yard. In 2004 the old yard was abandoned and the company moved to a new shipyard outside the city limits on Luonnonmaa island in Naantali. The company now operates one of the largest dry docks in the Baltic Sea area used solely for ship repair. It is owned by BLRT Grupp.

=== Engines ===
Wärtsilä, the company, is today one of the leading producers of large diesel engines for ships and power plants, producing Wärtsilä-Sulzer and the Wärtsilä-Vasa engines. The engine factory was also located on the Aura riverbank. In 2004 Wärtsilä decided to move production of its diesel engines from Turku to its factory in Italy.

== Ships ==
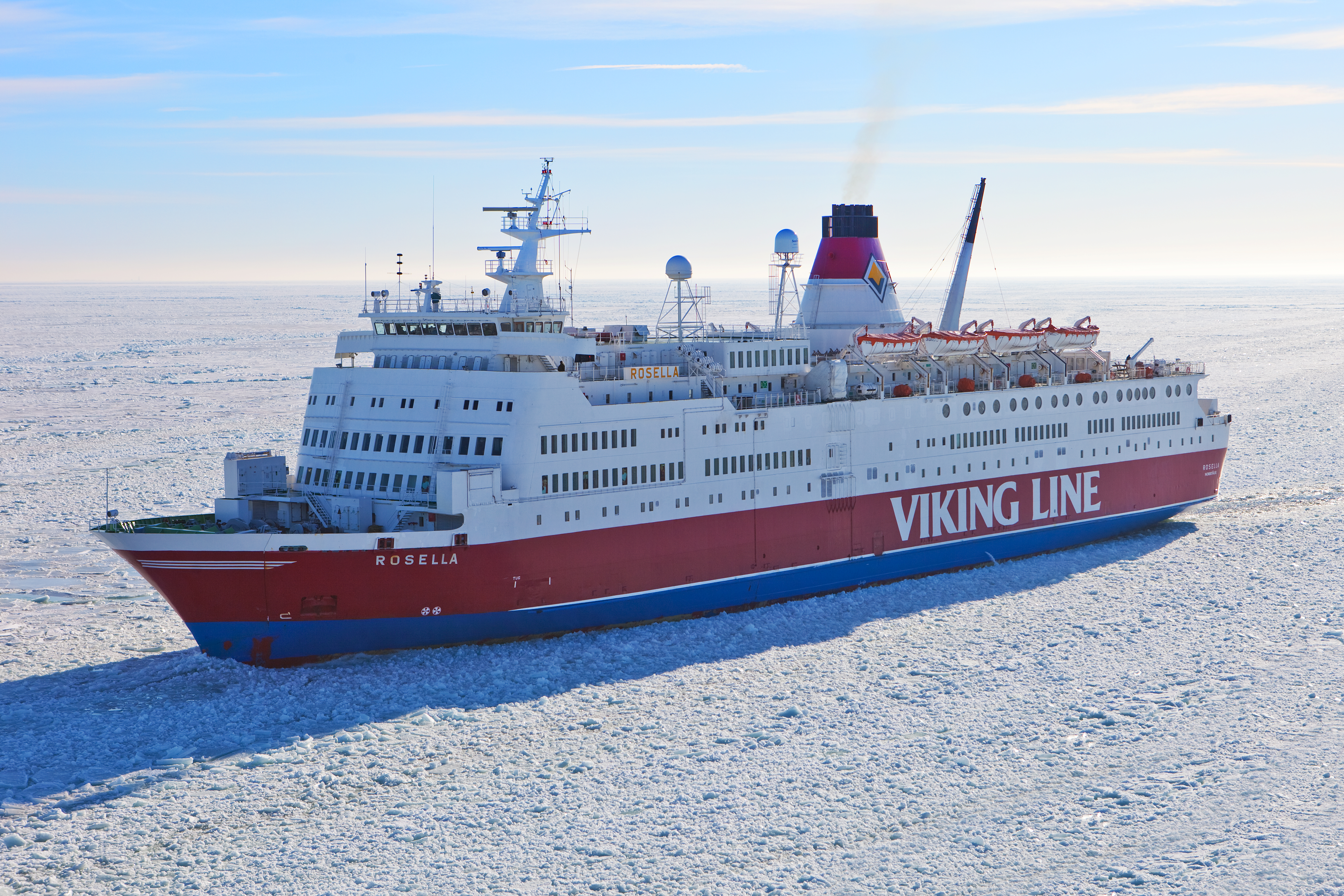
MS Rosella, the last ship launched at the old shipyard, was still serving her original owner until 2023, before being sold to a new owner.

A number of ships produced at the old shipyard are still in service, a few examples:

- MV Freewinds, the floating "university" of the Church of Scientology.
- In 1975–76 Wärtsilä delivered five Belorussiya-class cruiseferries to the Soviet Union.
- Sister ships MS Turella and MS Rosella delivered to SF Line for Turku-Stockholm service.
- MS Bore I delivered to Steamship Company Bore (member of Silja Line) also for Turku-Stockholm service.

== See also ==
- List of vessels built at Crichton-Vulcan and Wärtsilä Turku shipyards
- Finnish maritime cluster
- AG Vulcan
