= Finnish coastal defence ship Väinämöinen =

1932 Finnish Navy coastal defence ship

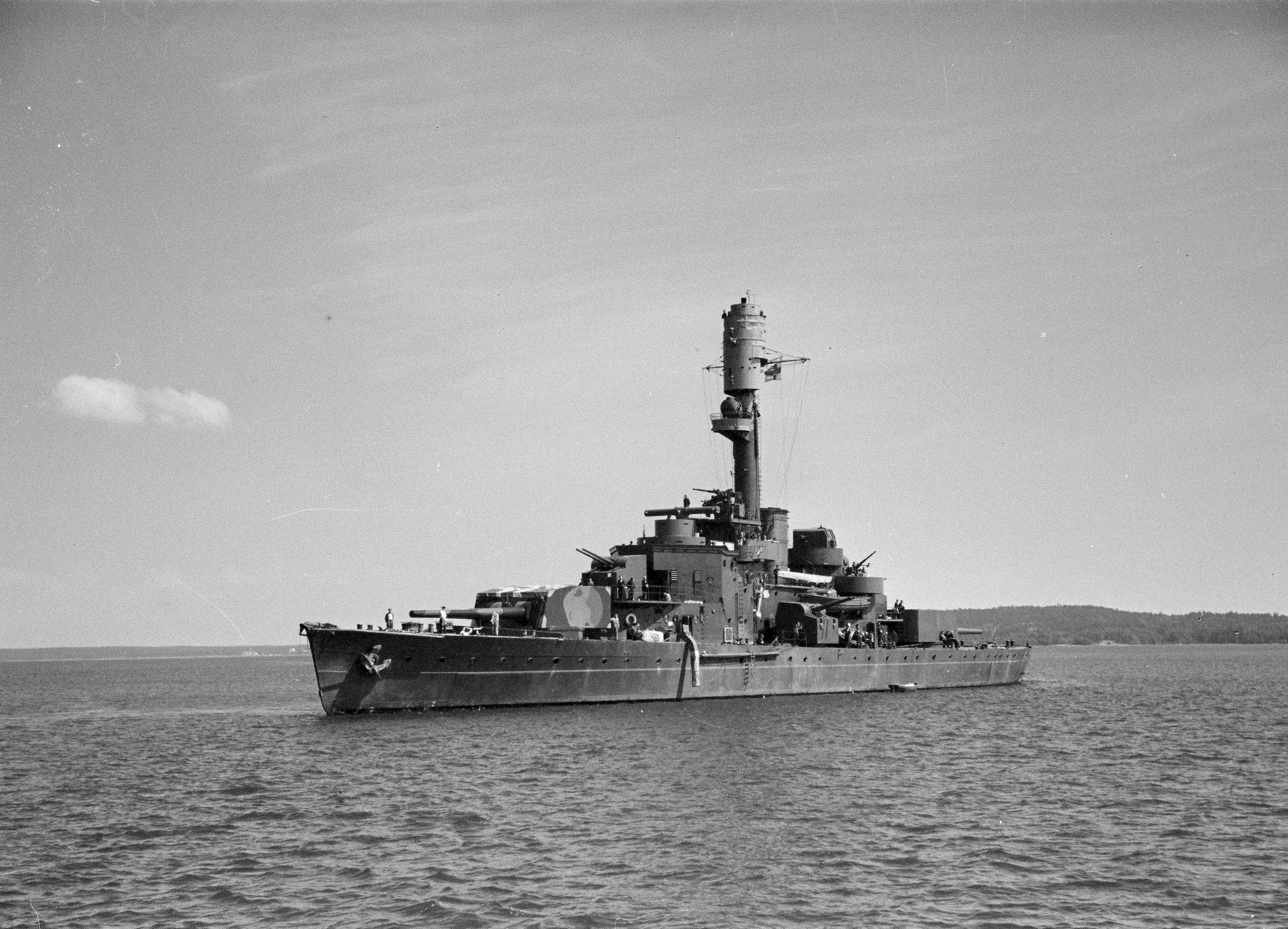

History

Finland
- Name: Väinämöinen
- Namesake: Väinämöinen
- Ordered: 1927
- Builder: Crichton-Vulcan Oy, Turku, Finland
- Laid down: August 1929
- Launched: 29 April 1932
- Commissioned: 28 December 1932
- Fate: Transferred to Soviet Union 29 May 1947

Soviet Union
- Name: Vyborg
- Acquired: 29 May 1947
- Fate: Scrapped 1966

General characteristics
- Class & type: Väinämöinen-class coastal defence ship
- Displacement: 3,900 long tons
- Length: 93.0 m (305.1 ft)
- Beam: 16.864 m (55.33 ft)
- Draught: 5.0 m (16.4 ft)
- Propulsion: Diesel-Electric powertrain; four Krupp engines 875 kW (1,173 hp), two shafts.; 3,500 kW (4,700 hp)
- Speed: 14.5 knots (26.9 km/h; 16.7 mph)
- Range: 700 nmi (1,300 km; 810 mi)
- Complement: 410
- Armament: [1939]; 2 × 2 × 254 millimetres (10 in) Bofors; 4 × 2 × 105 mm Bofors; 4 × 40 mm Vickers; 2 × 20 mm Madsens; [1944]; 2 × 2 × 254 millimetres (10 in) Bofors; 4 × 2 × 105 mm Bofors; 4 × 40 mm Bofors; 8 × 20 mm Madsens

Väinämöinen was a Finnish coastal defence ship, the sister ship of the Finnish Navy's flagship Ilmarinen and also the first ship of her class. She was built at the Crichton-Vulcan shipyard in Turku and was launched in 1932. Following the end of the Continuation War, Väinämöinen was handed over to the Soviet Union as war reparations and renamed Vyborg. (Note: Vyborg was also the name of a Soviet merchantman sunk by the Finnish submarine Vesikko.) The ship remained in Soviet hands until her scrapping in 1966.

== Design ==
Väinämöinen and Ilmarinen were built to protect vital maritime areas as an independent nation and to defend its long coastline. The acquisition was driven by several key military and strategic reasons; protecting maritime trade, preventing amphibious landings, mobile coastal fortifications, replacing outdated vessels. The acquisition of the coastal defense ships was a major and costly national effort, authorized by the Navy Act of 1927 (alongside submarines). Although the project sparked heated political debate over whether the funds should instead go to the army or air force, the ships played a significant role during the Winter War and the Continuation War, particularly in the air defense of Turku and the protection of the coast.

The design of the Väinämöinen-class coastal defense ships (Väinämöinen and Ilmarinen) was heavily tailored to Finland’s unique geographical, strategic, and financial constraints. Because they were engineered by a Dutch front company (NV Ingenieurskantoor voor Scheepsbouw or IvS, which secretly bypassed Versailles Treaty restrictions on German naval design), they incorporated several specific principles.

=== Shallow-Draft Archipelago Mobility ===
The ships were designed with a shallow draft (around 5 meters / 16.4 feet) to navigate the shallow, complex channels and narrow straits of the Finnish archipelago. This allowed them to use islands and shallow waters for cover and move rapidly between different sectors of the coast.

=== Disproportionately Heavy Firepower ===
To punch well above their weight, they were outfitted with heavy main batteries—two twin turrets carrying 254 mm (10-inch) Bofors guns. Relative to their modest 3,900-ton displacement, carrying guns typically found on much larger capital ships was intentional, giving them the capability to destroy or heavily deter major enemy warships.

The ship's heavy armament of 254-millimetre (10 in) Bofors guns could fire shells of 255 kilograms (562 lb) up to 31 kilometres (19 mi).

=== Optimized Local Defense over Open-Ocean Range ===
They were explicitly not built as blue-water battleships. They traded away long cruising range, high fuel capacity, and open-ocean seaworthiness in exchange for localized defensive power, high stability as a gun platform in calmer coastal waters, and compactness.

=== Diesel-Electric Propulsion ===
They utilized a modern diesel-electric powertrain (using Krupp engines). This system provided good maneuverability, quick response times from a dead stop, and eliminated the lengthy startup times required by traditional steam boilers—vital for a ship needing to ambush targets or dodge air attacks on short notice. Balanced Dual-Purpose and Anti-Aircraft Defense: Alongside their heavy main guns, the design featured versatile 105 mm Bofors secondary guns capable of functioning both as anti-surface and heavy anti-aircraft weapons, reflecting a growing foresight into the dangers of air power.

=== Targeted Armor Protection ===
Rather than heavy global armor, they were protected by an armored belt (around 50–55 mm) and thicker turret/conning tower armor specifically calculated to withstand hits from destroyer- and cruiser-caliber fire (such as Soviet 130 mm naval guns) and shrapnel, while keeping the overall weight low enough to maintain the shallow draft.

=== Fire control ===
In fire control, the two coastal ships were identical. The fire control centre and the gun turrets were connected electrically so that ranging and orders could be given without spoken contact. With the aid of mechanical calculators, the values were transferred directly to the gun turrets.

== Operational history ==
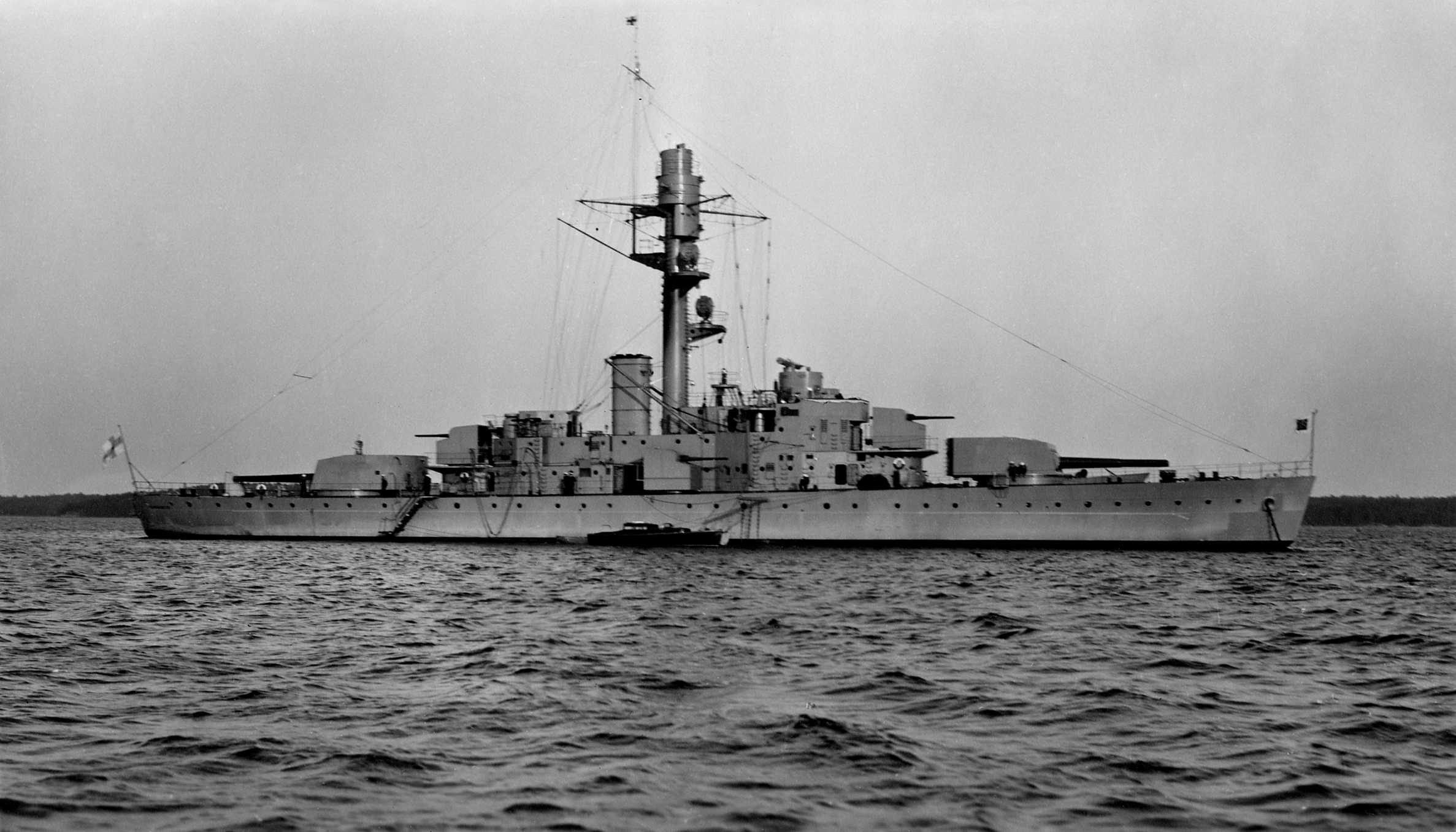
Väinämöinen in 1938

=== Winter War ===
During the Winter War, the two coastal defence ships were transferred to the Åland islands to protect against invasion. When the ice cover started to become too thick in December, the ships were transferred to Turku, where their anti-aircraft artillery aided in the defence of the city.

=== Continuation War ===
The only time Väinämöinen and Ilmarinen fired their heavy artillery against an enemy was at the beginning of the Continuation War, during the Soviet Red Army evacuation of their base at the Hanko Peninsula. Väinämöinen also participated in the distraction manoeuvre Operation Nordwind on 13 September 1941, during the course of which her sister ship Ilmarinen was lost to mines.

In 1943 "Detachment Väinämöinen", which consisted of Väinämöinen, six VMV patrol boats and six motor minesweepers, was moved east to take positions along the coast between Helsinki and Kotka. She did not actively participate in many operations, since the heavier Soviet naval units never left Leningrad, where they were used as floating batteries during the siege. As a result, Väinämöinen's primary operational duties were to patrol the Gulf of Finland between the minefields "Seeigel" and "Nashorn", as well as protection of the German-Finnish anti-submarine net across the gulf.

During the Soviet assault in the summer of 1944, the Soviets put much effort into trying to find and sink Väinämöinen. Reconnaissance efforts revealed a large warship anchored in Kotka harbour and the Soviets launched an air attack of 132 bombers and fighters. However the target was not Väinämöinen — instead it was the German anti-aircraft cruiser Niobe, which was sunk during this attack.

=== Postwar ===
After the end of the Continuation War Väinämöinen was handed over as war reparations to the Soviet Union. The ship was handed over on 29 May 1947 to the Soviet Baltic Fleet, where she was renamed Vyborg. The ship served over 6 years in the Red Fleet at the Soviet base in Porkkala, Finland. The ship was called Vanya (a Russian short form of the name Ivan) by the sailors of the Baltic Fleet.

Vyborg was modernized during the 1950s and served for a while as an accommodation ship in Tallinn. Preparations to scrap the ship were begun in 1958. During this time, there were talks to return the ship to Finland. The ship was, however, scrapped in 1966 at a Leningrad scrapyard. According to Soviet calculations, 2,700 tons of metal were recovered.

== Bibliography ==
- Aromaa, Jari (2018). "The Coast Defence Ship Väinämöinen (1930)". In Taylor, Bruce (ed.). The World of the Battleship: The Lives and Careers of Twenty-One Capital Ships of the World's Navies, 1880–1990. Barnsley: Seaforth Publishing. ISBN 978-0-87021-906-1.
- Haukiala, Olli-Pekka (2004). "Question 22/00: Finnish Coast Defense Ship "battleship" Vainamoinen". Warship International. XLI (3): 240–241. ISSN 0043-0374.
- Hone, Trent; Miller, Vernon J.; Spindler, John & Wilderding, John H. Jr. (2001). "Question 22/00: Finnish Coast Defense Ship "battleship" Vainamoinen". Warship International. XXXVIII (3). International Naval Research Organization: 238–239. ISSN 0043-0374.
