= Elomatic =

Finnish consulting and engineering company

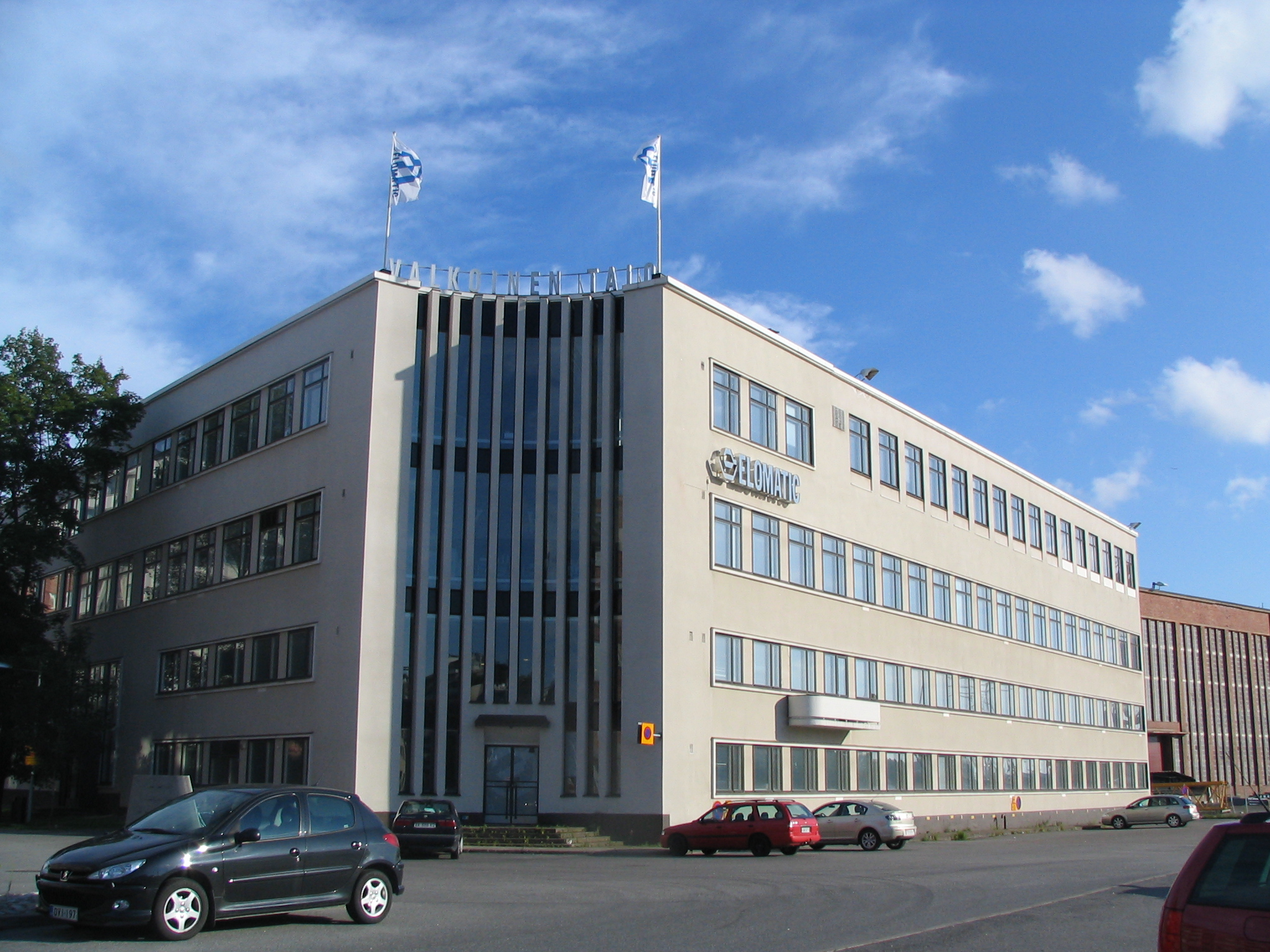
- Elomatic headquarter in Turku, Finland.
- Type: osakeyhtiö
- Industry: Mechanical industry; Process industry; Pharmaceutical industry; Shipbuilding industry; Energy industry; Software development
- Founded: 1970; 56 years ago in Turku, Finland
- Founder: Ari Elo
- Headquarters: Turku, Finland
- Area served: Globally
- Key people: Tom Lind, President, CEO
- Revenue: 159 million euros (2025)
- Number of employees: 1,271 in the group (2025)
- Website: www.elomatic.com

Elomatic is a Finnish, privately owned consulting and engineering firm that employs around 1,300 people internationally. It offers expert services, products, and turnkey solutions to the process, machinery, marine, energy, and pharmaceutical industries. The company designs heavy icebreakers, pharmaceutical plants, electric boiler plants. and pre-commercial plants that advance the circular economy, among other things.

Elomatic has customers in more than 70 countries and offices in various parts of the world. The group's head office is located in Turku, Finland.

== History ==
=== 1970–1999 ===
Ari Elo, from Turku, founded Elomatic in 1970.

In 1979, the Swedish shipyard Karlskronavarvet and Elomatic agreed on the design of two tankers.

The Elomatic group developed a computer program for its own use for the design of ships. In 1982, the company's engineering design software business was incorporated as a separate company. In 1985, the subsidiary Cadmatic Inc. was founded in the United States.

Half of the revenue of the Elomatic group, which employed 180 people at the time, came from exports. It also had subsidiaries in Sweden and Norway.

In September 1999, Elomatic and Deltamarin signed a ship design agreement with the American company Litton Ingalls Shipbuilding. The order covered two luxury passenger ships intended for service in Hawaii.

=== 2000– ===
In 2006, the company signed an agreement with the Aker Yards shipyard on the design of a Genesis-class cruise ship.

In May 2014, Elomatic bought a stake in Wellquip. Later that year, Elomatic and Wellquip began cooperation with Aker Arctic. The companies aimed to design and market offshore structures.

In 2016, the company had almost 800 employees in Finland, the Netherlands, India, Italy, China, Poland, Serbia, Russia, and the United Arab Emirates. Elomatic and Deltamarin signed an agreement with the German shipyard MV Werften on the design of a Global-class passenger ship.

In 2018, Elomatic and Deltamarin announced that they would design a second Global-class vessel for MV Werften. The same year, Elomatic bought the Finnish country company of the Swedish FS Dynamics, which specialized in consulting related to computational fluid dynamics and structural analysis services.

In 2020, Elomatic had more than 1,100 employees. In 2021, Flexens and Elomatic founded Green H2UB Oy.

In September 2023, Elomatic bought Elron Oy, which operates in the energy sector as a consulting company, particularly in wind power production. In October 2023, the company invested in the Canadian subsidiary of the Norwegian Varme Energy, which turns waste into energy.

In January 2025 Elomatic bought Ablemans LCS, which focuses on retrofit projects in the shipbuilding industry.

== Organization ==
In 2026 the group has offices in 18 countries, including Finland, India, Canada, Poland, Germany and the United States.

Elomatic's CEO is Tom Lind and the chairman of the board is Patrik Rautaheimo. In addition to Ari Elo and his family, the company's owners include company personnel.

== Subsidiaries and associated companies ==
Of Elomatic's subsidiaries, Ablemans LCS operates in Finland and the United States, NAYA Life Sciences in Finland, Macedonia and Slovenia and Nomine Consult in Estonia and Lithuania.

Cadmatic Oy is a software company within the Elomatic Group. In 2021, Elomatic owned 53 percent of the company; the other owners were Mandatum and the company's management and personnel. The company makes design software needed in shipbuilding, construction and the process industry. Cadmatic has more than 20 offices on five continents.

Elomatic's subsidiary Green North Energy (originally Green H2UB Oy) is developing the Naantali hydrogen project, which includes plans for a facility producing green hydrogen and ammonia in connection with Turun Seudun Energiantuotanto's power plant in Naantali. The company has also signed letters of intent for hydrogen and ammonia plants in the Finnish cities of Kemi and Pori and on supplying green ammonia produced with renewable electricity to a cargo ship that Meriaura has ordered from Wärtsilä.

== Products and services ==
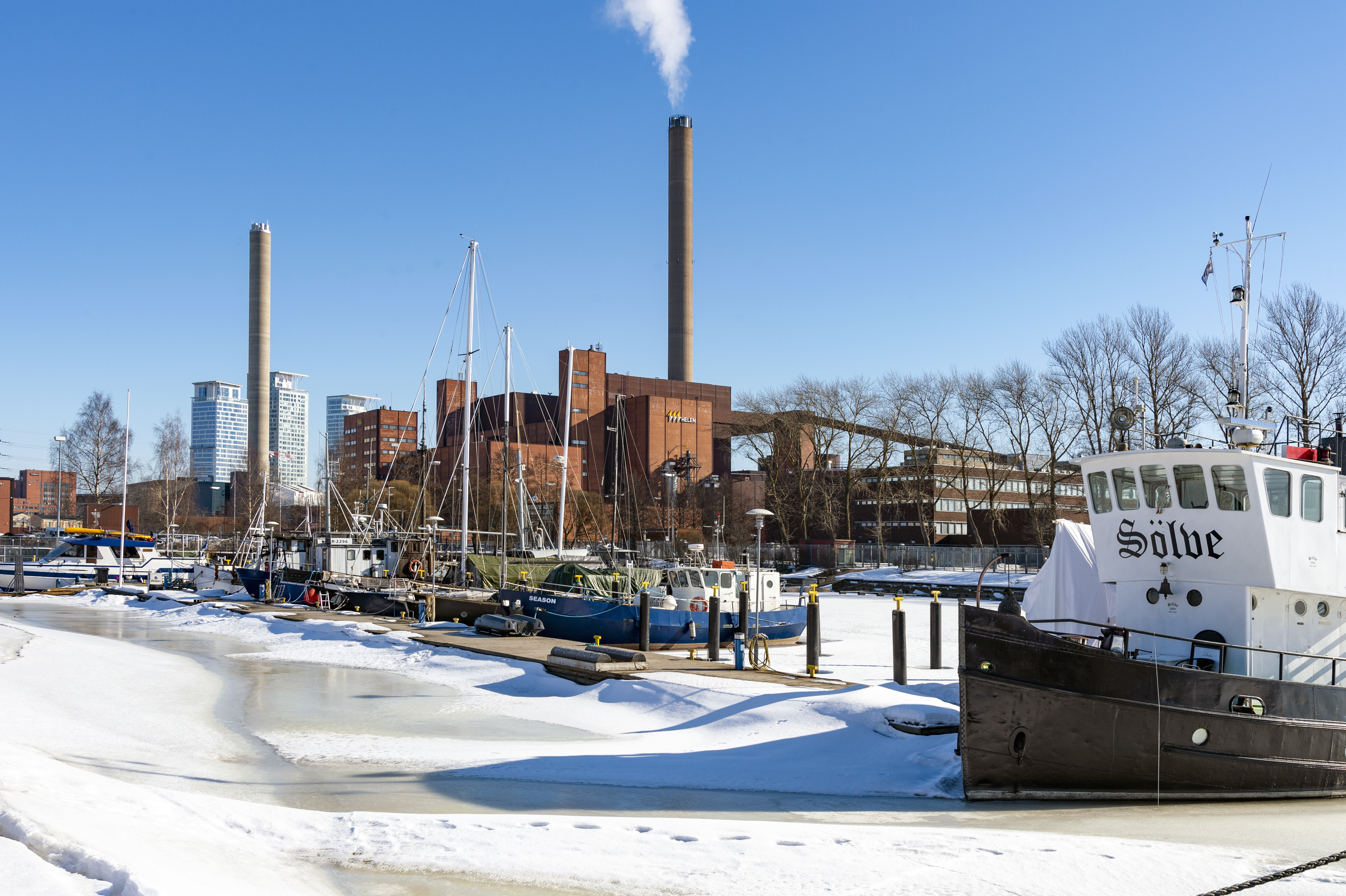
Elomatic has designed the 200-megawatt electric boiler plant project at Helen Oy's Hanasaari power plant

The company focuses on engineering, technical consulting, software development, project management, and product development. The company first specialized in ship and shipbuilding design, and today it produces products and services for the marine industry as well as for biotechnology, the pharmaceutical and process industries and the energy industry and for the public sector.

The company's projects:

- Construction-phase design of the Canadian Coast Guard's Polar icebreaker
- Design and engineering of the new Polarstern research icebreaker in cooperation with thyssenkrupp Marine Systems (tkMS)
- Installation of Elomatic's Elogrid™ tunnel thruster technology on METEOR IV, a German research vessel built by the MEYER FASSMER Spezialschiffbau consortium for the German Federal Ministry of Education and Research, to improve thruster performance and reduce fuel consumption.
- Concept and basic design of the process section and a cleanroom delivery for the new pharmaceutical plant of Biovian, a manufacturer of biological medicines
- Design of two Indian COVID-19 vaccine plants
- An EPCM project related to Helen's electric boiler plant in Hanasaari
- Design of a plant in Jyväskylä for Zero Mine Solutions, which recovers valuable metals from electronic waste
