= Perno =

City district in Turku, Finland

Coordinates: 60°27′22″N 22°9′40″E

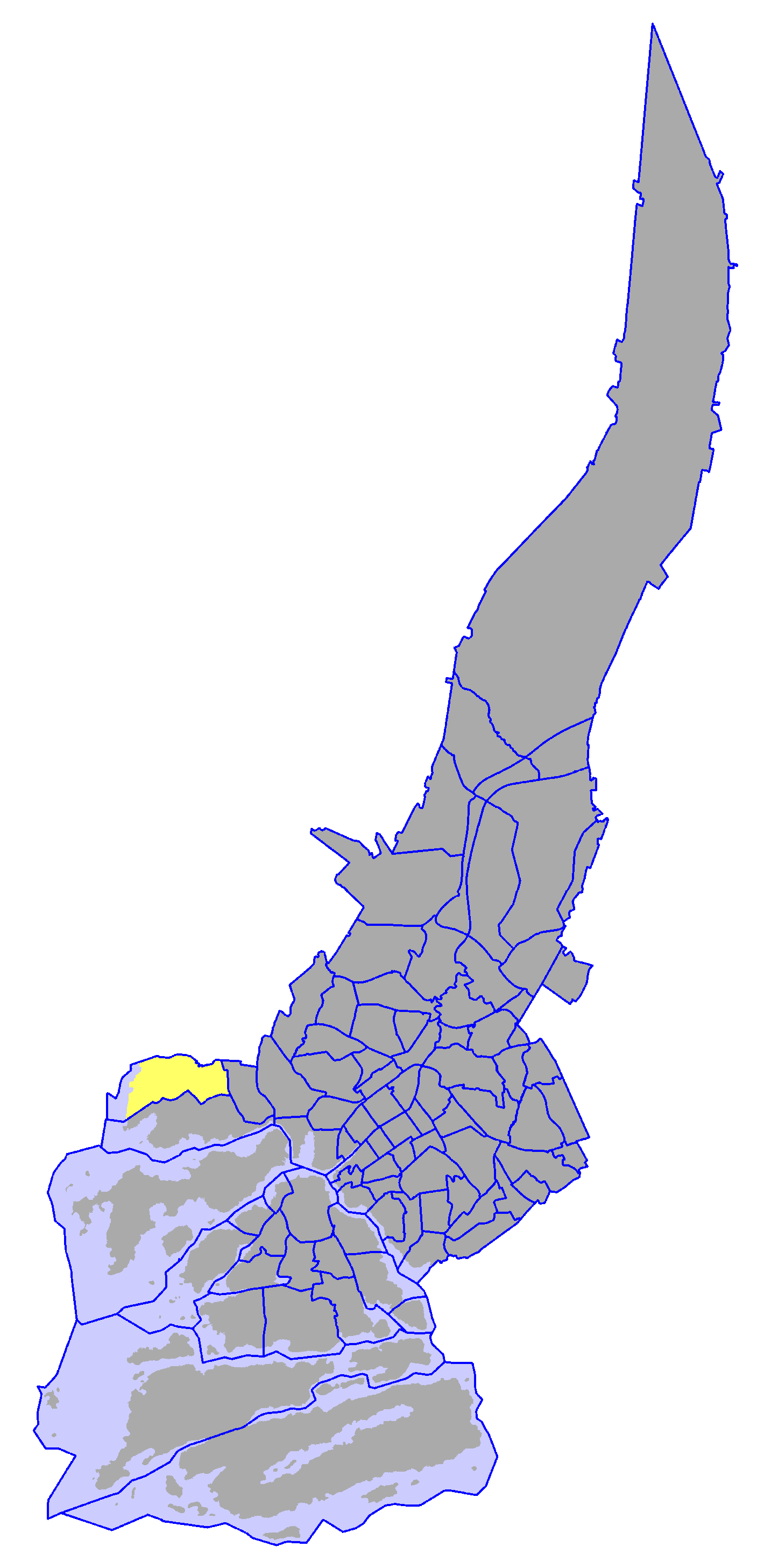
Perno on a map of Turku.

Perno is a district in the Naantalintie ward of the city of Turku, in Finland. It is located to the west of the city, and is mainly a high-density residential suburb. There is also a large maritime dock operated by Meyer Turku.

The current (as of 2004) population of Perno is 2,513, and it is increasing at an annual rate of 0.28%. 17.83% of the district's population are under 15 years old, while 9.39% are over 65. The district's linguistic makeup is 90.81% Finnish, 2.39% Swedish, and 6.80% other.

== See also ==
- Districts of Turku
- Districts of Turku by population
