= Finnish submarine Vetehinen =

World War II-era submarine

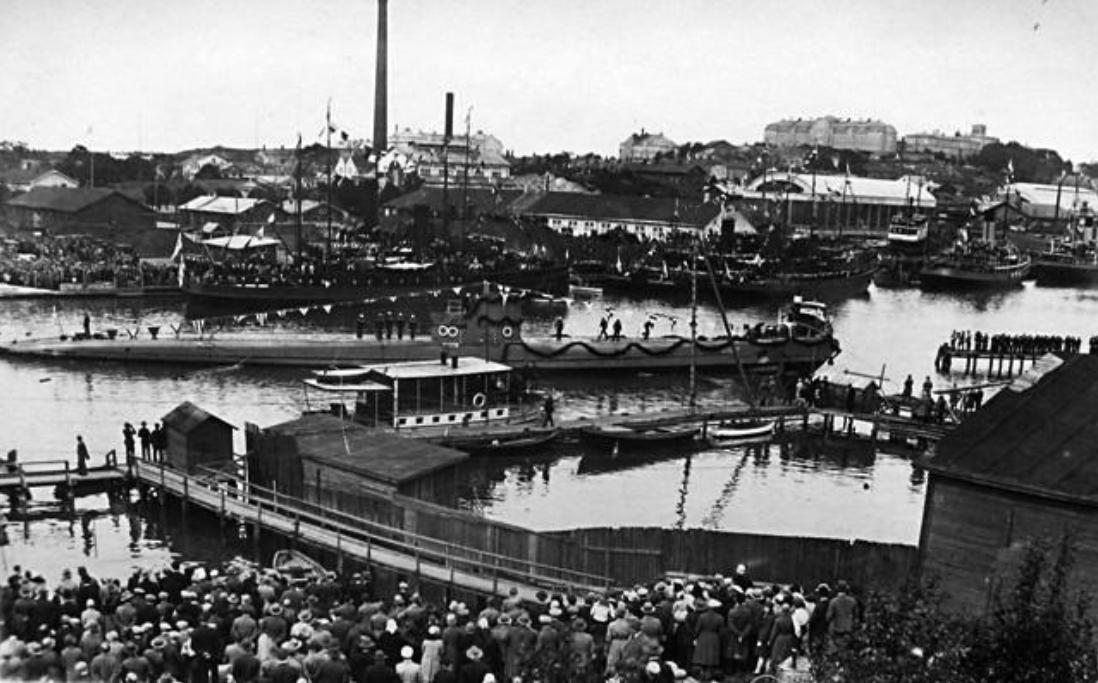

History

Finland
- Name: Vetehinen
- Ordered: 16 September 1926
- Builder: Crichton-Vulcan, Turku, Finland
- Laid down: 1926–27
- Launched: 1 June 1930
- Commissioned: 13 October 1930
- Decommissioned: 1946
- Fate: Scrapped 1950s

General characteristics
- Class & type: Vetehinen-class submarine
- Displacement: 493 tonnes surfaced, 716 tonnes submerged
- Length: 63.5 m (208.3 ft)
- Beam: 6.2 m (20.3 ft)
- Draft: 3.6 m (11.8 ft)
- Propulsion: Polar Atlas Diesel-electric, 1,016 hp (758 kW) , ABB
- Speed: 12.6 knots (23.3 km/h; 14.5 mph) surfaced, 8.5 knots (15.7 km/h; 9.8 mph) submerged
- Range: 1,575 nmi (2,917 km; 1,812 mi) at 10 knots (19 km/h; 12 mph) surfaced, 75 nmi (139 km; 86 mi) at 4 knots (7.4 km/h; 4.6 mph) submerged
- Complement: 30 men
- Armament: 4 × 533 mm torpedo tubes, 2 bow, 2 stern (6 torpedoes); 20 mines in vertical shafts; 1 × 76 mm/48 Bofors; 1 × 20 mm/60 Madsen; 1 × 12.7 mm; Added in 1942: Depth charge rack (4 depth charges)

Vetehinen was a 500-tonne Vetehinen-class submarine that was constructed in the early 1930s, which served in the Finnish Navy during the Second World War. The submarine was the first ship of its class of three submarines. The name vetehinen means "merman".

== Combat operations ==
=== Winter War ===
The Finnish Navy was informed that the 8,800 ton Soviet icebreaker Yermak would be arriving in the Baltic Sea from the Atlantic. Vetehinen was sortied to intercept the icebreaker off the port of Liepāja on 4 December. However, the submarine ran aground before reaching open sea and had to be pulled loose by tugs before it was able to start its voyage. Vetehinen arrived at the site on 6 December and started patrolling off the buoy on the port entrance. On 7 December the submarine sighted Yermak but was unable to reach it. While on station, Vetehinen encountered a couple of unknown submarines which were suspected to be of German origin. On 8 December Vetehinen began the voyage home and was attacked by the Soviet Shchuka-class submarine ShCh-324, but the attack failed and the Finnish submarine crew did not even notice the attempt.

On 12 December Vetehinen sortied again to intercept Yermak, this time on its voyage from Liepāja to Tallinn. However once again before reaching the open sea Vetehinen ran aground and had to be inspected before continuing on its mission the same day. Upon reaching the area the submarine was unable to sight the icebreaker and was recalled on 14 December.

=== Continuation War ===
On 22 June 1941 Vetehinen laid 20 mines north of Kunda, and a further 17 mines on 28 June between Suursaari and Tytärsaari.

On 3 July 1941 Vetehinen encountered a freighter west of Suursaari but due to distance was only able to damage it with its 76 mm gun.

On 3 August 1941 Vetehinen sighted a Soviet convoy consisting of pair of large minesweepers and a group of guard ships escorting a group of Soviet submarines. One torpedo was launched at a distance of 1,500 metres (1,600 yd) to no effect.

On 8 August 1941 Vetehinen launched two torpedoes at a 1500-ton freighter, but neither of the torpedoes exploded.

The Italian torpedoes (Finnish designation "T/40") proved to be unreliable in service despite functioning during test range firings. It was later discovered that these torpedoes were unreliable when fired from a submerged sub because the increased water pressure caused the seals of the torpedo detonators to fail. For this reason a report that the Finns received from the besieged Hanko that a Soviet freighter had arrived there with two Finnish torpedoes sticking out from its hull became more believable.

On 30 November Vetehinen sortied to intercept a convoy but was unable to reach it.

On 3 December 1941 Vetehinen sighted a Soviet convoy headed due east from Hanko and engaged it. The submarine attacked on the surface but the poor quality of the night sight and the activity of the escort prevented torpedoes from being fired with any accuracy. Vetehinen fired both bow tubes and after turning around both aft tubes at the convoy without any effect, at an estimated distance of 2,500 metres (2,700 yd). A mere 15 minutes later the submarine sighted another Soviet convoy, this time headed due West, but had no loaded tubes and was unable to engage it.

During 1942 Vetehinen was upgraded with new 12-hydrophone listening arrays and equipped with a depth charge rack capable of carrying four depth charges. The submarine was further modified by streamlining the tower and moving the 20 mm gun up to the tower.

On 5 November 1942, Vetehinen rammed the Soviet submarine ShCh-305 in the Sea of Åland and sank it. According to Vetehinen crew members, she was on a night patrol searching for Soviet submarines, which stayed underwater during daytime but usually came up during the night to recharge their batteries. A contact was found, and after confirmation of an enemy contact Vetehinen launched a torpedo, which missed probably due to being fired at too short distance. Vetehinen then opened fire with its deck guns. A second torpedo also missed, but the deck guns managed to damage the Soviet submarine which by then had started an emergency dive. The Captain of Vetehinen, determined not to let the submarine escape, ordered his submarine to ram the other vessel which at last was a success – the "teeth" on the bow of the ship ripped open the Soviet submarine's hull and caused it to sink. Vetehinen suffered a minor leak from the impact but managed to return to its home port.

On 5 July 1944 Vetehinen laid 17 mines near Koivisto islands.

== Bibliography ==
- Kijanen, Kalervo (1968). Suomen Laivasto 1918–1968 I [Finnish Navy 1918–1968, part I]. Helsinki: Meriupseeriyhdistys/Otava.
- Kijanen, Kalervo (1968). Suomen Laivasto 1918–1968 II [Finnish Navy 1918–1968, part II]. Helsinki: Meriupseeriyhdistys/Otava.
- Submarine construction details
- YLE radio reportage onboard from 1938 (in Swedish)
- Dutch Export Submarines — Ingenieurskantoor voor Scheepsbouw
