= Birinci İnönü-class submarine =

Turkish coastal submarine class

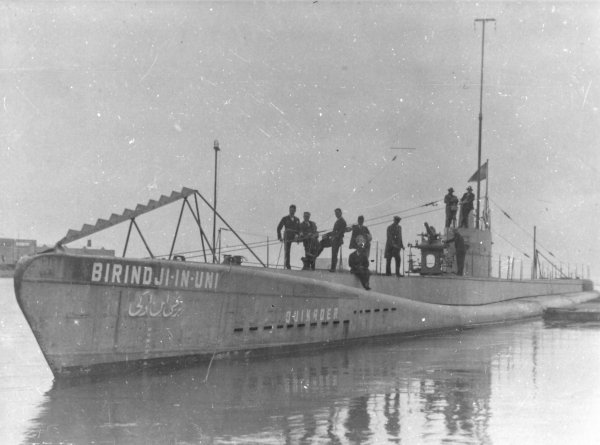
- Birinci İnönü (written as Birindji-In-Uni) in 1928

Class overview
- Name: Birinci İnönü class
- Operators: Turkish Navy
- Succeeded by: Oruç Reis class
- Built: 1926–1928
- In service: 1928–c. 1950
- Completed: 2
- Scrapped: 2

General characteristics
- Type: Coastal submarine
- Displacement: Surfaced: 507 tons; Submerged: 620 tons
- Length: 58.67 m (192 ft 6 in)
- Beam: 5.79 m (19 ft 0 in)
- Draft: 3.51 m (11 ft 6 in)
- Installed power: Surfaced: 1,100 bhp (820 kW); Submerged: 700 shp (520 kW)
- Propulsion: 2 × MAN diesel engines; 2 × electric motors 2 shafts
- Speed: Surfaced: 13.5 knots (25.0 km/h; 15.5 mph); Submerged: 8.5 knots (15.7 km/h; 9.8 mph)
- Complement: 29
- Armament: 6 × 450 mm (18 in) torpedo tubes (4 bow, 2 stern); 1 × 75 mm (3.0 in) deck gun; 1 × 20 mm (0.79 in) anti-aircraft gun

The Birinci İnönü class was a pair of coastal submarines operated by the Turkish Navy between 1928 and the early Cold War. Their design was heavily based on the World War I-era Type UB III U-boat and built in the Netherlands to capitalize on German submarine experience. The boats, Birinci İnönü and İkinci İnönü, meaning "First İnönü" and "Second İnönü" respectively, had uneventful histories and operated with the Navy throughout the rest of the interwar period and World War II before they were decommissioned in the 1950s.

== Development and design ==
After World War I, the Allied powers seized the Ottoman Navy and reduced it to a small coastal force. The fleet remained under foreign control during the Turkish War of Independence and was returned to the new Republic of Turkey in 1922. Due to government instability and a lack of funds, the navy was initially a low priority. Four years later, efforts to rebuild the force began, which included repairs, refits, and an order for two new submarines. Design work for the two boats were undertaken by NV Ingenieurskantoor voor Scheepsbouw (IvS), a clandestine Dutch front company founded by Kaiserliche Marine officials intended to maintain German submarine experience to circumvent limitations introduced by the Treaty of Versailles. The design for the Turkish submarines was based on the World War I-era Type UB III coastal U-boat, as IvS used the opportunity to further develop and modernize the design for later German use. The submarines retained many characteristics from the Type UB III, but featured a second stern torpedo tube that was achieved by decreasing the diameter of each tube.

The class measured 58.67 metres (192 ft 6 in) in length, with a beam of 5.79 metres (19 ft 0 in) and a draught of 3.51 metres (11 ft 6 in). They displaced 507 tons surfaced and 620 tons submerged, with a complement of 29. Armament consisted of six 450 mm (18 in) torpedo tubes with four forward and two aft, a 75 mm (3.0 in) deck gun, and a 20 mm (0.79 in) anti-aircraft gun. Propulsion was provided by two MAN diesel engines and two electric motors producing 1,100 brake horsepower (820 kW) and 700 shaft horsepower (520 kW), respectively, which drove two propeller shafts. The submarines could achieve speeds of 13.5 knots (25.0 km/h; 15.5 mph) surfaced and 8.5 knots (15.7 km/h; 9.8 mph) submerged.

== Service history ==
After being ordered in 1925, the two submarines were built at Fijenoord in Rotterdam and constituted the first warships built for the Navy since before World War I. The boats were commissioned in 1928, were named Birinci İnönü and İkinci İnönü (Note: also spelled Birindci İnönü and İkindci İnönü.) after the first and second battles of İnönü, and were sailed to Istanbul by German crews. The two boats remained in Turkish service for the next several decades, and were discarded sometime in the 1950s.

Data
Name	Laid down	Launched	Commissioned	Stricken
Birinci İnönü	1926	1 February 1927	1928	c.1950
İkinci İnönü	1926	12 March 1927	1928	c.1950
