= Vetehinen-class submarine =

Finnish marine submarine class

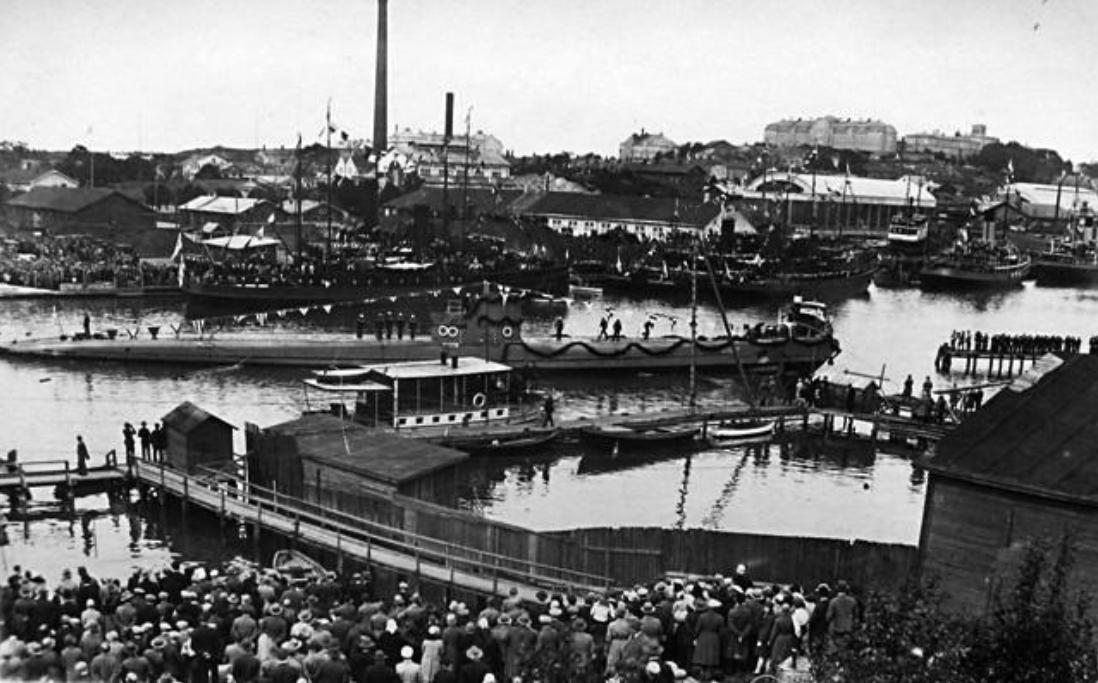
- Vetehinen during her launching ceremony.

Class overview
- Name: Vetehinen class
- Builders: Crichton-Vulcan
- Operators: Finnish Navy
- Completed: 3

General characteristics
- Type: Submarine
- Displacement: 493 tonnes surfaced, 716 tonnes submerged
- Length: 63.5 m (208.3 ft)
- Beam: 6.2 m (20.3 ft)
- Draught: 3.6 m (11.8 ft)
- Propulsion: Diesel-electric, 1,016 hp (758 kW)
- Speed: 12.6 knots (23.3 km/h) surfaced, 8.5 knots (15.7 km/h) submerged
- Range: 1,575 nmi (2,917 km) at 10 knots (19 km/h) surfaced, 75 nmi (139 km) at 4 knots (7.4 km/h) submerged
- Complement: 30 men
- Armament: 4 × 533 mm torpedo tubes, 2 bow, 2 stern (6 torpedoes); 20 mines in vertical shafts; 1 × 76 mm/48 Bofors; 1 × 20 mm/60 Madsen; 1 × 12.7 mm; Added in 1942: Depth charge rack (4 depth charges)

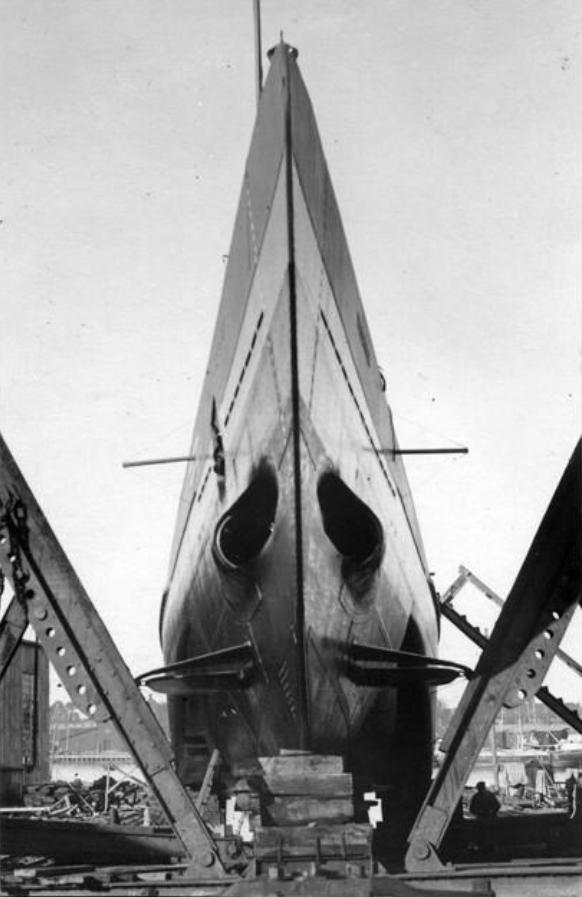
Bow view of a Vetehinen-class submarine.

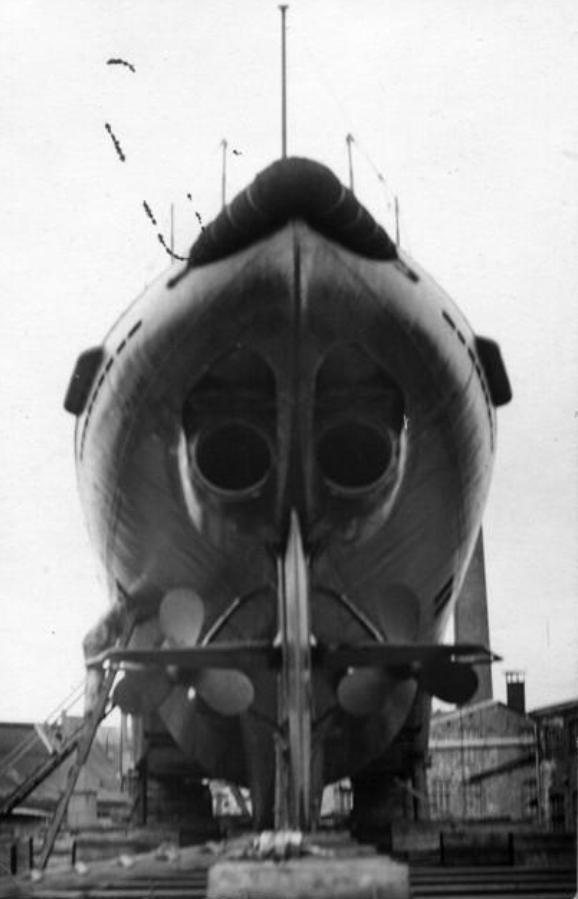
Stern view of a Vetehinen-class submarine.

The Vetehinen-class submarine was a Finnish 500-tonne submarine class of three vessels that was designed and built in the 1920s and early 1930s. The Vetehinen class served in the Finnish Navy during World War II. The class was designed by the Dutch front company Ingenieurskantoor voor Scheepsbouw den Haag (I.v.S) (set up by Germany after World War I in order to maintain and develop German submarine know-how and to circumvent the limitations set by the Treaty of Versailles) and built by the Finnish Crichton-Vulcan shipyard in Turku. The class was based on the German World War I Type UB III and Type UC III submarines and served as prototype for Type VII submarines.

The word vetehinen means a merman. Vetehinen-class submarines were designed as minelaying submarines and were built with mineshafts for 20 mines. Submarines had special inner rails for two torpedo tubes to enable 450 mm (18 in) torpedoes to be used instead of the 533 mm (21 in) torpedoes.

== Submarines of the class ==
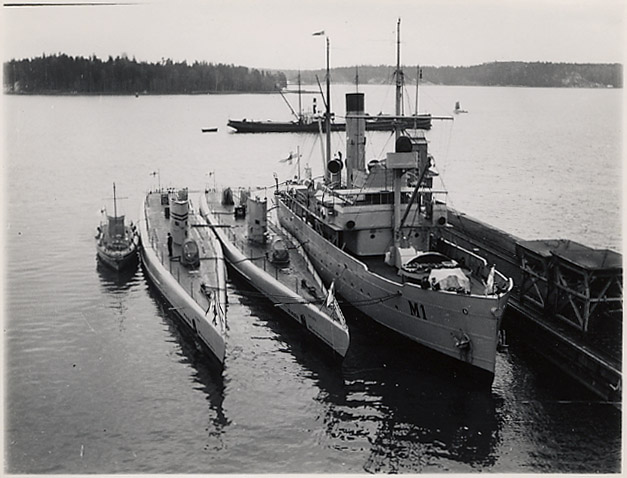
Two Vetehinen-class submarines.

- Vetehinen
- Vesihiisi
- Iku-Turso
