= Finnish submarine Saukko =

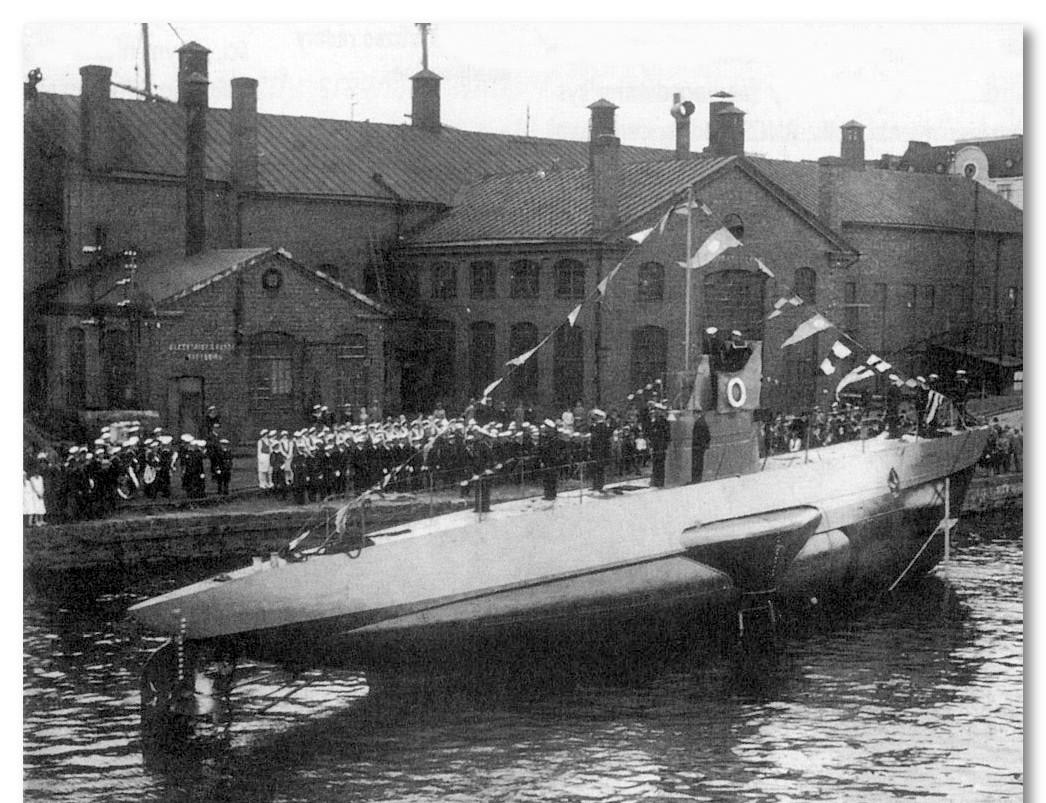
- Saukko after being launched in 1930

Class overview
- Builders: Sandvikens Skeppsdocka och Mekaniska Verkstad, Helsinki
- Operators: Finnish Navy
- In service: 1930–1952
- In commission: 16 December 1930 – 1947
- Completed: 1
- Retired: 1
- Preserved: 0

General characteristics
- Displacement: 114 tonnes (112 long tons; 126 short tons) surfaced; 142 tonnes (140 long tons; 157 short tons) submerged
- Length: 32.4 m (106 ft)
- Beam: 4.1 m (13 ft)
- Draft: 2.9 m (9.5 ft)
- Propulsion: 1 × Germaniawerft diesel, 200 hp (150 kW); 1 × electric motor 120 shp (89 kW).
- Speed: 9 kn (17 km/h; 10 mph) surfaced; 5.7 kn (10.6 km/h; 6.6 mph) submerged
- Range: 375 nautical miles (694 km; 432 mi) at 8 knots (15 km/h; 9.2 mph) surfaced; 45 km (28 mi) at 4 kn (7.4 km/h; 4.6 mph) submerged
- Complement: 15
- Armament: 2 × 18 in (460 mm) bow torpedo tubes (2 torpedoes); 1 × 12.7 mm machine gun; 6–9 × mines

Saukko (Pu110) was a small submarine that served in the Finnish Navy during the Second World War. It was designed not to exceed 100 tonnes (98 long tons; 110 short tons), as it was planned for use in Lake Ladoga, and according to the 1920 Treaty of Tartu, no nation was allowed to use naval ships of more than 100 tonnes on the lake (When completed, Saukko weighed somewhat more than this). The submarine could be divided into separate sections and transported by rail. The conning tower could be lifted off entirely. The engines were in the aft section and the batteries in the forward section. The name "Saukko" means European otter.

== The construction of Saukko ==
The construction of Saukko began in 1928 at Sandvikens Skeppsdocka och Mekaniska Verkstad in Helsinki. The design was based on German drawings for the submarine Pu110 ("smaller, quickly assemblable submarine prototype"). Launched on 2 July 1930, Saukko was declared ready for service on 16 December 1930. At that time it was the world's smallest submarine, officially weighing only 99 tonnes (97 long tons; 109 short tons). Saukko had a crew of 15 men. The outer hull was designed for icy conditions.

== Operational history ==
Original plans called for Saukko to be brought to the town of Lahdenpohja on Lake Ladoga by rail, but this was never implemented. During the Winter War (1939–1940) and the Continuation War (1941–1944), the submarine operated in the Gulf of Finland.

=== Winter War ===
Saukko, accompanied by several motor torpedo boats, was towed by the gunboat Karjala to Koivisto on 7 December 1939. Since hostilities had started before the Finnish Navy had a chance to lay defensive minefields outside their coastal forts, it was hoped that Saukko might be able to accomplish that task. A Leningrad-class destroyer and five other Soviet destroyers reached the area on 8 December, and began to shell Finnish positions. The slow Saukko could not engage the Soviet destroyer group. The next day, ice prevented Finnish boats from sortieing against the bombarding Soviet ships. When the ice was finally broken, half of the air valves on Saukko were frozen, which nearly caused the boat to capsize when it tried to submerge to lay a minefield. After these failures, the Finnish boats were withdrawn from the area.

=== Continuation War ===
On 3 July 1941 Saukko was patrolling off the island of Sommers when she sighted two patrol vessels by the pier. The submarine fired a torpedo but was forced to withdraw, without being able to observe results, by harassing Soviet patrol boats.

== Gallery ==
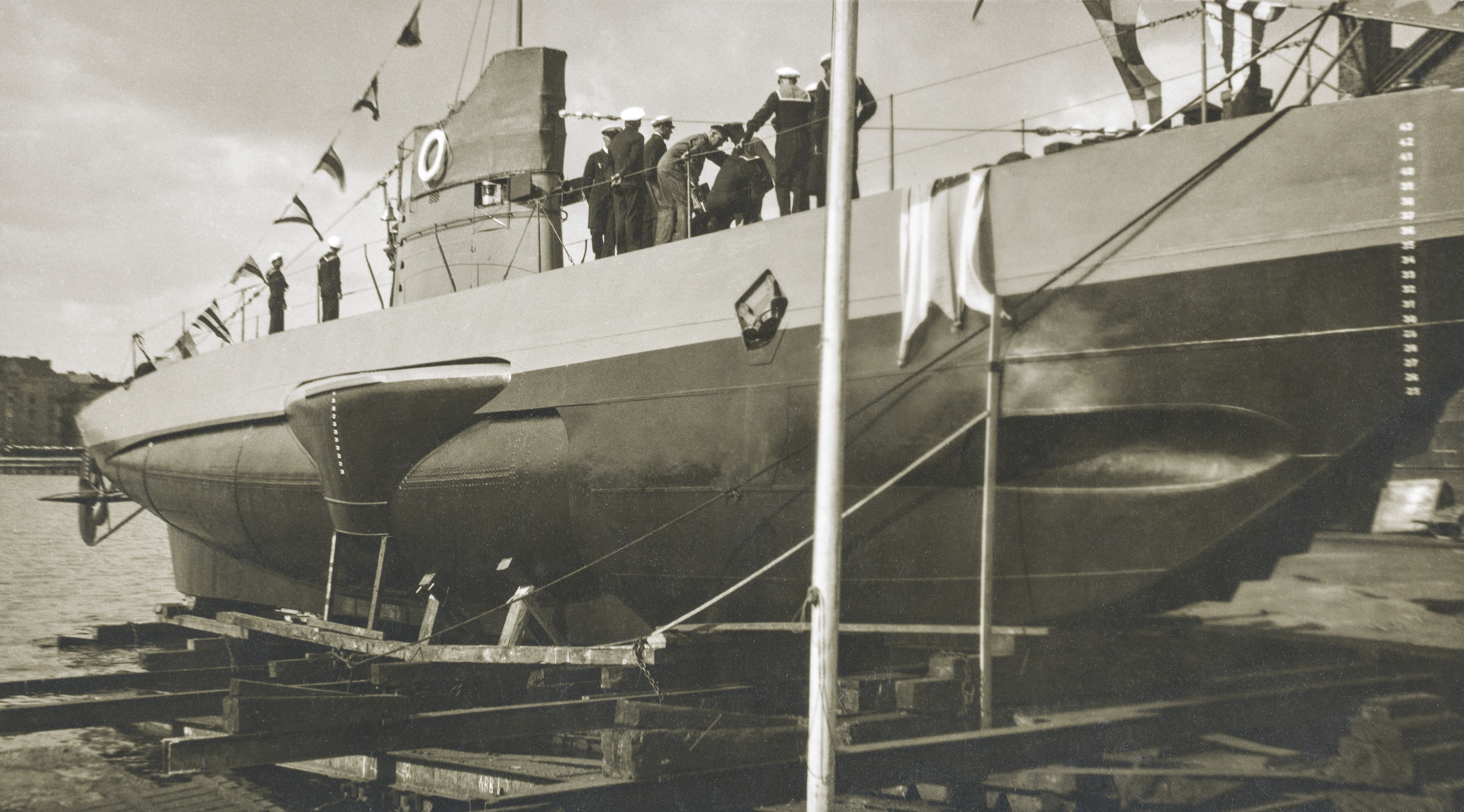
Launch of the ship at Hietalahti shipyard, 2 July 1930

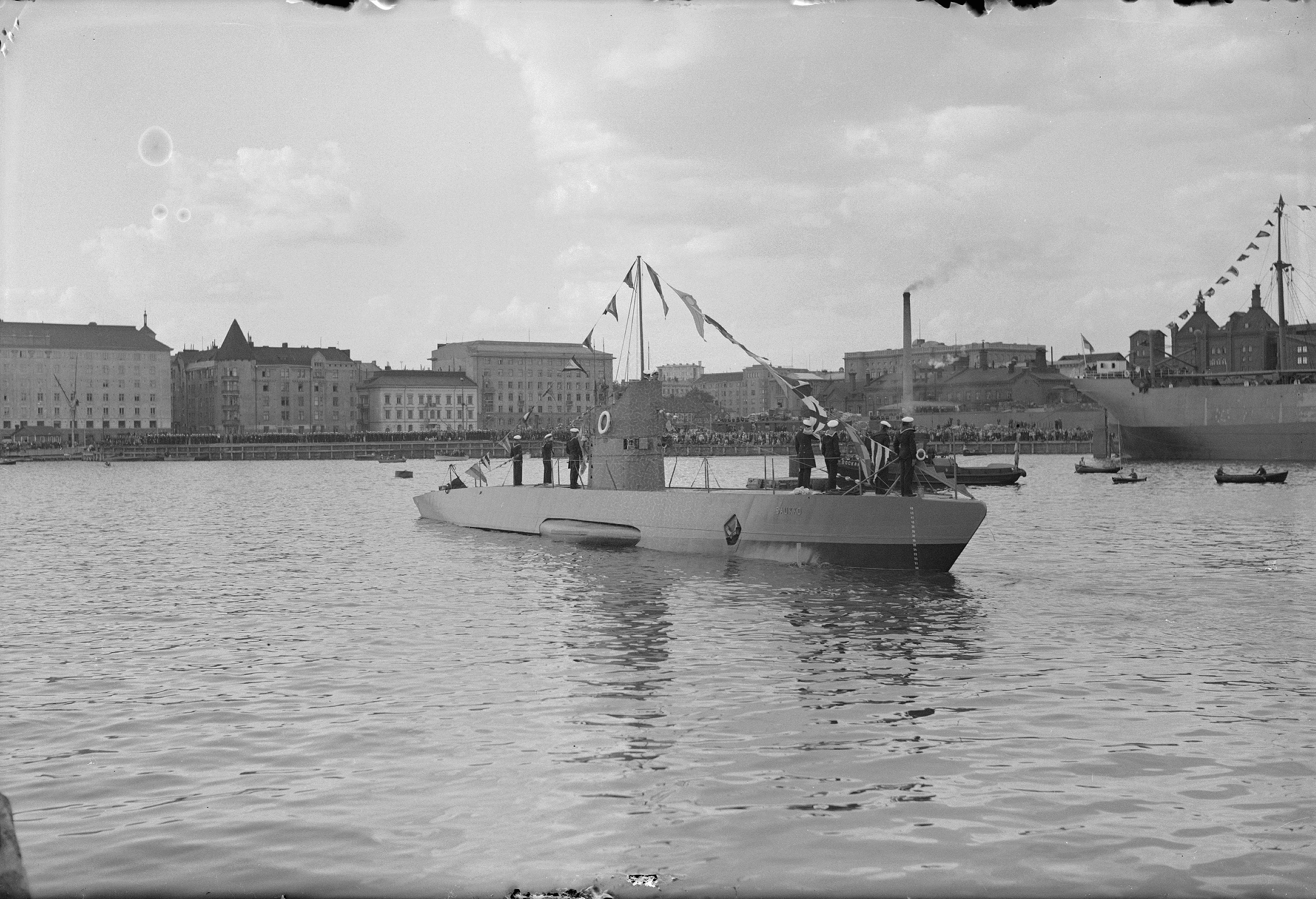
Launch ceremony

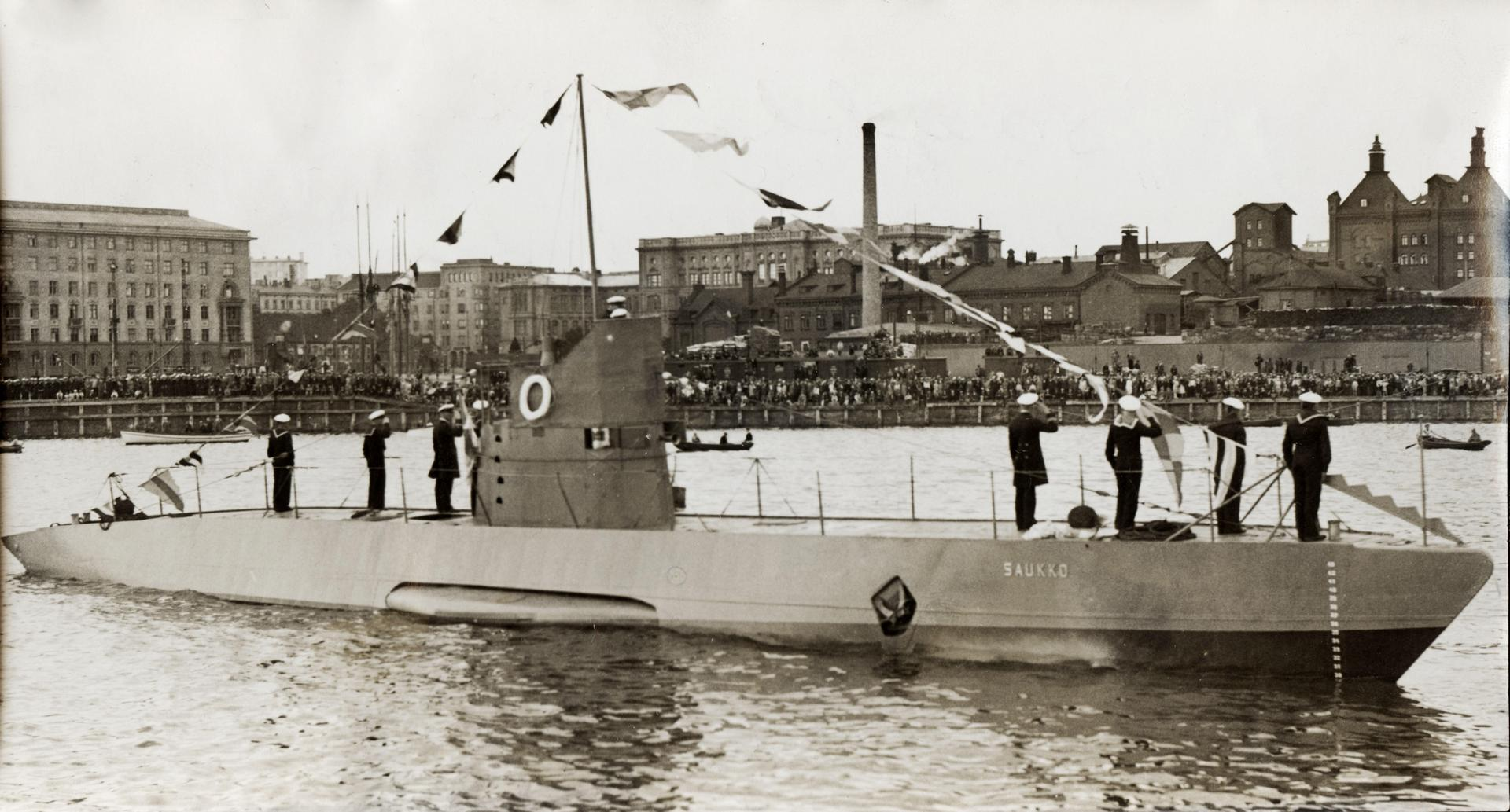
Launch ceremony

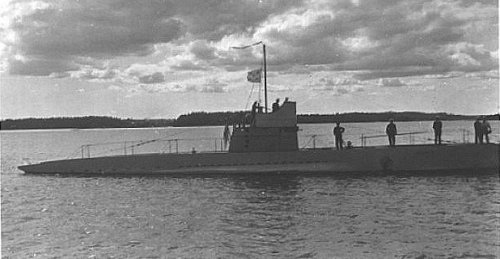
In the archipelago
