= Finnish torpedo boat S2 =

Torpedo boat

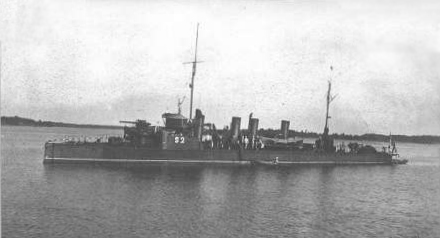

History

Russian Empire
- Name: Gagara (Гагара) (1901–1902); Prozorlivy (Прозорливый) (1902–1918)
- Ordered: 1898
- Launched: 26 June 1899
- Commissioned: September 1901
- Fate: Taken over by Finland in 1918

Finland
- Name: S2
- Commissioned: 1918
- Fate: Lost in a storm on 4 October 1925

General characteristics
- Class & type: Sokol-class torpedo boat
- Displacement: 290 tons
- Length: 57.9 m (190 ft)
- Beam: 5.6 m (18 ft)
- Draft: 1.7 m (5.6 ft)
- Propulsion: two steam engines, four Yarrow boilers, 3,800 hp
- Speed: 27 knots (50 km/h)
- Range: 550 nautical miles (1,020 km) at 15 knots
- Complement: 53 (52 in Russian service)
- Armament: 1901–1912: 1 × 75 mm/50; 3 × 47 mm; 2 × 381 mm torpedo tubes; 1912–1925: 2 × 75 mm/50; 2 × MG's; 2 × 456 mm torpedo tubes; 14–18 mines

S2 (formerly Prozorlivy and later Gagara in Russian service) was a Finnish Sokol-class torpedo boat captured from Russia after the Finnish Civil War in 1918. She sank in a severe storm on 4 October 1925, with the loss of all 53 crew members.

== Background ==
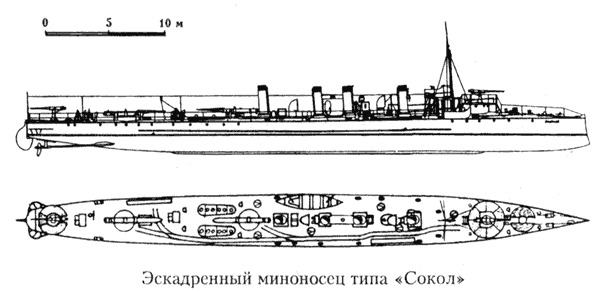
A diagram of a Sokol-class torpedo boat.

Between 1900 and 1908, the Imperial Russian Navy built 25 Sokol-class torpedo boats for service with the Baltic Fleet. The name Sokol (Russian: Сокол) means "falcon". The fourth vessel of the class, Gagara (Russian: Гагара, meaning "loon"), was constructed at the Neva Shipyard in Saint Petersburg under yard number 102. On 9 March 1902, the vessel was renamed Prozorlivy (Russian: Прозорливый, meaning "sharp-sighted" or "perceptive"). In 1911, she was temporarily converted for use as a trawler. Following the outbreak of World War I, she was recommissioned as a minesweeper and operated from bases in Finnish ports.

During the Russian Revolution of 1917, discipline within the Baltic Fleet deteriorated and several ships experienced mutinies. Amid the political turmoil, Finland declared independence from Russia on 6 December 1917. Tensions between socialist and non-socialist factions soon escalated into the Finnish Civil War in early 1918. Elements of the Russian Baltic Fleet remained in Finnish ports, and many Russian sailors sympathised with the socialist Reds. However, the non-socialist Whites, supported by German military intervention in southern Finland, ultimately prevailed.

In April 1918, as German forces advanced towards Helsinki, the Russian Baltic Fleet began evacuating its ships to Russia during the Ice Cruise of the Baltic Fleet. Due to severe ice conditions in the Gulf of Finland, only the largest vessels were able to withdraw. Several smaller ships, including Prozorlivy, were left behind. On 13 April 1918, Prozorlivy was seized by Finnish White forces and subsequently incorporated into the Finnish Navy, together with several sister ships: Ryany (later S1), Poslushny (later S3), Rezvy (later S4), Podvizhny (later S5), and No. 212 (later S6).

In Finnish service, Prozorlivy initially supported British naval operations in the Baltic Sea against Bolshevik forces. Under the terms of the Treaty of Tartu signed in 1920, three of the Sokol-class vessels were returned to Soviet Russia in 1922. Although Prozorlivy was initially included among the ships to be returned, she was instead retained by Finland and formally transferred to Finnish ownership. She was renamed S2 in 1922.

S2 remained in service until 4 October 1925, when she was lost in a storm with the loss of all 53 crew members. The sinking was the worst peacetime naval disaster in Finnish naval history and prompted significant public reaction. The loss contributed to the initiation of a naval modernisation programme aimed at renewing and strengthening the Finnish fleet.

== The last journey of the torpedo boat S2 ==
An annual tradition of the Finnish Navy was a training cruise along the Finnish coastal towns of the Gulf of Bothnia, which also served as a training exercise for conscripts. In October 1925, the gunboats Klas Horn and Hämeenmaa, together with the torpedo boats S1 and S2, departed on such a voyage. The planned route included visits to several coastal cities as far north as Tornio. The formation left Uusikaupunki for Vaasa on 3 October 1925, proceeding in line ahead formation at a speed of 12 knots (22 km/h; 14 mph) with an interval of one kabellängd (0.1 nautical miles (0.19 km; 0.12 mi)) between vessels. S2 was the last ship in the formation.

Weather conditions deteriorated during the voyage as winds strengthened and developed into a severe storm. The ships increased their spacing and reduced speed in response to the worsening sea conditions. Near the latitude of Pori, the storm intensified further and the formation began to disperse. Klas Horn, acting as flotilla leader, turned westward towards the Swedish coast to seek shelter, followed by Hämeenmaa. The smaller torpedo boats were unable to maintain the same speed in the heavy seas and fell behind.

During the night, wind speeds reached hurricane force, estimated at 48–55 m/s (Beaufort scale 12). The severe sea conditions caused the propellers of the torpedo boats to periodically rise out of the water, reducing propulsion efficiency. Both S1 and S2 began taking on water. On S2, worn shaft bearings caused excessive vibration, which further increased the risk of structural damage and leakage. The heavy seas also increased coal consumption as greater engine power was required to maintain headway. A distress signal was transmitted by Klas Horn on behalf of the torpedo boats. Rescue vessels, including the Finnish salvage ship Protector from Vaasa and the Swedish rescue vessel Helios, were dispatched in response. The ships were subsequently ordered to proceed independently to the nearest available harbour. Klas Horn continued towards Sweden, Hämeenmaa headed for Vaasa, and S1 managed to reach Mäntyluoto near Pori with only minimal fuel remaining.

S2 also attempted to reach safety near Pori, but her situation worsened as the engines and pumps began to fail and flooding increased. Land remained visible, and radio communication with Vaasa continued until shortly before the loss of the vessel. The final radio message from S2 was received at 13:23, approximately two minutes before the ship sank. In response to a call from Vaasa, the radio operator replied: "I cannot work now."

== The accident ==
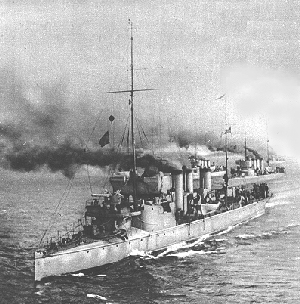
S2 with her sister ships

The pilot station at Reposaari observed S2 struggling in heavy seas between Outoori and the Säppi Lighthouse. The vessel was seen rolling heavily in the high waves, and at approximately 13:25 a large breaker struck the ship. The vessel disappeared from view shortly thereafter. It was later confirmed that the ship observed had been S2. All 53 crew members were lost.

The loss of S2 was a major shock to the Finnish Navy and the public. An official investigation was launched to determine the cause of the disaster. The investigation found that the seabed in the area rises steeply, which can produce unusually steep and breaking waves, particularly in strong westerly and north-westerly winds. These sea conditions were considered a significant contributing factor. The investigation also noted technical and operational shortcomings. The seaworthiness of the ageing former Russian vessels had not been fully evaluated, and stability data such as ballast calculations and stability tables were incomplete or unavailable.

In addition, the investigation determined that the formation had not received the latest available weather reports. The conduct of the formation commander, Commander Yrjö Roos, was criticised for delaying the order to disperse and seek shelter. When the order was finally given, it was unclear and interpreted differently by the captains of the individual vessels.

Commander Roos died the following year, in 1926, while serving aboard a Finnish Navy vessel at Örö. The official investigation concluded that his death was caused by carbon monoxide poisoning resulting from a faulty exhaust system.

== Salvage ==
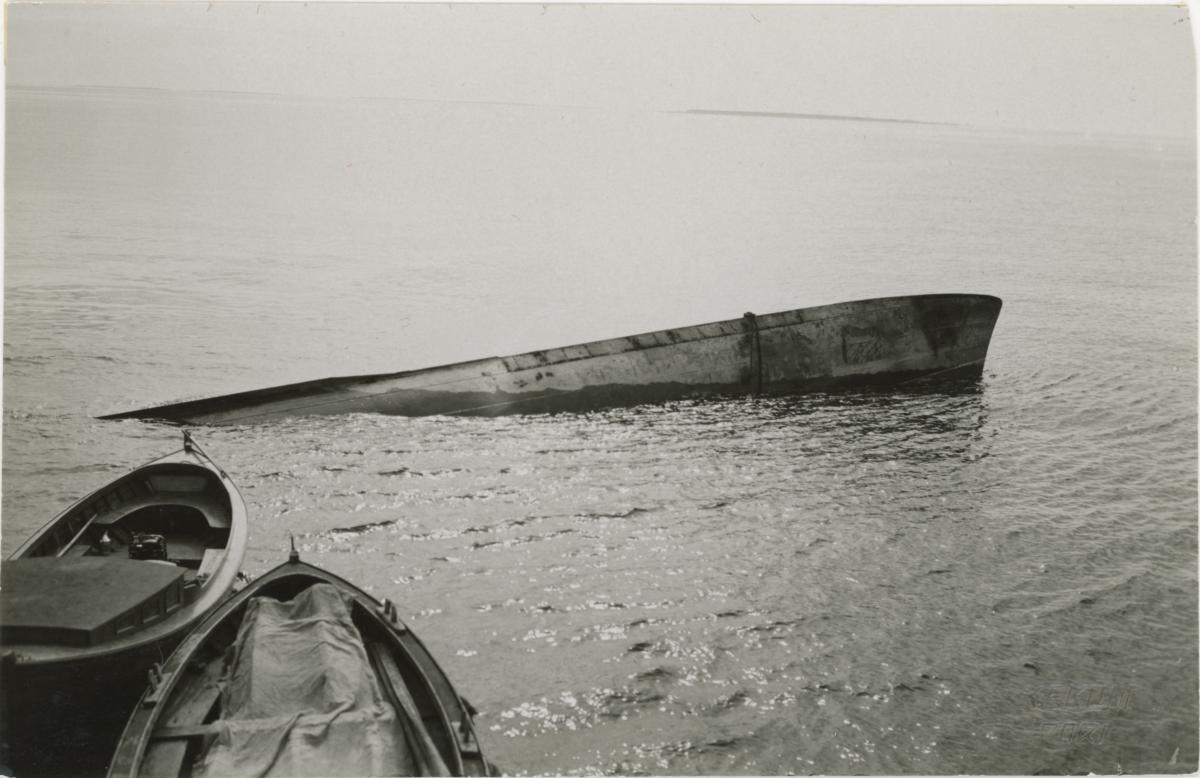
S2 salvage

The wreck of S2 was located in June 1926, and the Ministry of Defence began planning salvage operations. The vessel was lying upside down at a depth of approximately 15 metres (50 ft), and it was initially believed that raising the ship would be relatively straightforward.

The first attempts involved pumping compressed air into the hull to restore buoyancy. This succeeded in lifting the bow section to the surface, but the stern remained embedded in seabed mud. Efforts to free the stern using high-pressure water jets were unsuccessful.

Due to financial constraints, the Ministry of Defence transferred responsibility for the salvage to a private company. The salvors again used compressed air and placed lifting cables beneath the hull. After ten days of work, the vessel was successfully raised on 5 August 1926 with the assistance of pontoons.

The wreck was towed to Reposaari, where it was righted, drained, and examined. The remains of 23 crew members were recovered from inside the hull and taken ashore. The vessel was subsequently transported to Helsinki for further investigation. Following the investigation, S2 was scrapped.

== Legacy ==
The loss of S2 received widespread public attention in Finland and had a significant impact on the development of the Finnish Navy. The disaster and the subsequent public debate contributed to the founding of the Finnish Navy Association in 1926, now known as the Finnish Maritime Society. The organisation advocated for the modernisation of the fleet and influenced the adoption of the Fleet Law of 1927.

As a result of this programme, Finland commissioned the coastal defence ships Väinämöinen and Ilmarinen, developed a submarine force, and acquired new torpedo boats during the 1930s.

The remains of the 23 recovered crew members were buried in a joint grave at Reposaari cemetery on 15 August 1926. A memorial statue, designed by sculptor Wäinö Aaltonen, was erected at Reposaari Church in 1927. The anniversary of the sinking continues to be commemorated by the Finnish Navy.

== Ships of the class in the Finnish navy ==
Name	Service period in the Finnish navy
S1	1918–1930
S2	1918–1925 ^{(†)}
S3	1918–1922 ^{(}*^{)}
S4	1918–1922 ^{(}*^{)}
S5	1918–1944
S6	1918–1922 ^{(}*^{)}
† sunk on 4 October 1925 * given back to the Soviet union 1922, in accordance with the Treaty of Tartu 1920.

== Sources ==
- (in Swedish) Torpedbåten S2:s minne. Årsbok för Finlands flotta 2. Schildts 1925.
- (in Finnish) Torpedovene S2:n tuho 4.10.1925
- (in Finnish) The Finnish war veterans association's magazine, 5/2005, p 20.
- (in Finnish) Finnish page about wrecks.
