= American Holland-class submarine =

Submarine class

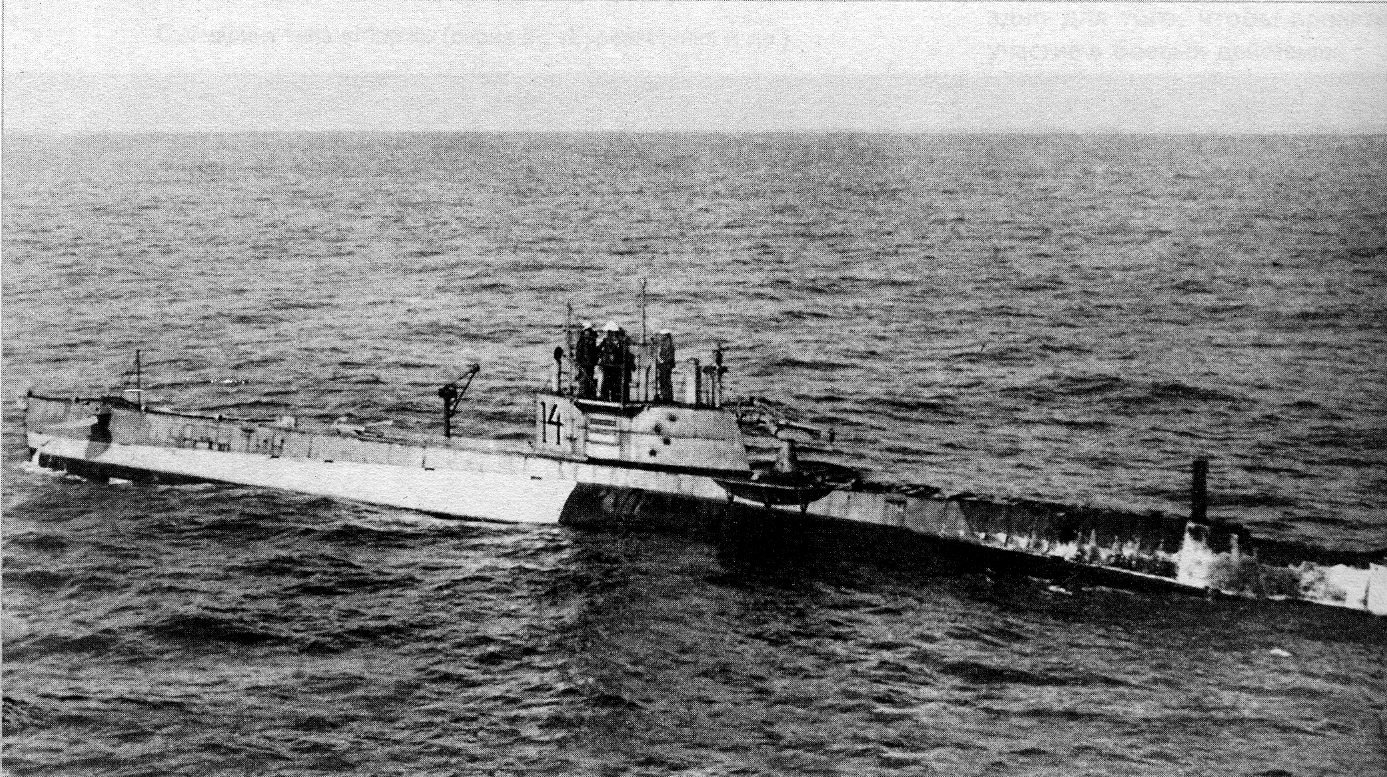
- AG-25

Class overview
- Operators: Imperial Russian Navy; Navy of the Ukrainian People's Republic; Finnish Navy; Soviet Navy
- In service: 1916
- In commission: 1950
- Planned: 17
- Completed: 11
- Canceled: 6
- Lost: 9
- Retired: 2

General characteristics
- Class & type: Diesel-electric submarine
- Type: Holland 602 type submarine, 602F, 602GF, 602L, 602R
- Displacement: 355 long tons (361 t) surfaced; 433 long tons (440 t) submerged
- Length: 150 ft 3 in (45.80 m)
- Beam: 16 ft (4.9 m)
- Draught: 12 ft 6 in (3.81 m)
- Propulsion: 2 shafts; 2 diesel engines (480 bhp (360 kW)); 2 electric motors (640 hp (480 kW))
- Speed: 13 knots (24 km/h; 15 mph) (surfaced); 10.5 knots (19.4 km/h; 12.1 mph) (submerged)
- Range: 1,750 nmi (3,240 km; 2,010 mi) at 7 knots (13 km/h; 8.1 mph) (surfaced); 25 nmi (46 km; 29 mi) at 3 knots (5.6 km/h; 3.5 mph) (submerged)
- Test depth: 50 metres (160 ft)
- Complement: 30
- Armament: 4 × bow 18-inch (457 mm) torpedo tubes; (8 torpedoes); 1 × 47-millimetre (1.9 in) gun

The American Holland-class submarines, also AG class or A class, were Holland 602 type submarines used by the Imperial Russian and Soviet Navies in the early 20th century. The small submarines participated in the World War I Baltic Sea and Black Sea theatres and a handful of them also saw action during World War II.

== Development ==
The AG type was designed by John Philip Holland at Electric Boat Company. The design was known as Holland 602GF/602L, which was very similar to the American H class. The Russian abbreviation "AG" comes from "Amerikansky Golland" ("American Holland"). In 1916, the Russian Naval Ministry ordered 11 units.

The boats were built at Barnet Yard in Vancouver, British Columbia, Canada as knockdown kits. The kits were transported by ship to Vladivostok and over the Trans-Siberian Railroad to European Russia. The boats were assembled at the Baltic Shipyard in Saint Petersburg and its subsidiary in Nikolayev by the Black Sea (now Mykolaiv, Ukraine). Like some of the British H-class boats (of the same design), they were equipped with Fessenden transducers, an early form of sonar.

The Russian Revolution of 1917 slowed assembly in Nikolayev, but they were completed after much travail. In 1918, submarines AG 21 – AG 26 were included the Ukrainian State Navy. In 1920, one (AG 22) was taken over by the Russian White movement, eventually evacuating to Bizerta with Wrangel's fleet and five were taken over by the Red Army after the Civil war. The submarines were all completed after the war. All surviving Soviet AG submarines were modernized before World War II.

The Russians had also ordered an additional six submarines, but these could not be delivered due to the Revolution. These were instead taken over by the U.S. Navy as the H class in 1918.

== Operational service ==
Five of the submarines were allocated to the Baltic Fleet, while the remaining six were allocated to the Black Sea Fleet.

During World War I, the Russian subs operated together with the British submarine flotilla in the Baltic against the German Navy. This all changed with the October Revolution and the Finnish Civil War.

In 1918, the German occupation of Tallinn and the Brest-Litovsk peace treaty forced the British flotilla to move to Helsinki, then under the protection of the Finnish Socialist Workers' Republic. The German intervention in the Finnish Civil War and the landing of the 10,000-strong German Baltic Sea Division in Hanko forced the crew to scuttle the eight remaining submarines and the three support ships, Cicero, Emilie and Obsidian, outside Helsinki harbour. Through negotiations with the Germans the many vessels of the Russian Navy moored in Helsinki were allowed to depart to Kronstadt. However, the difficult ice situation made it impossible for smaller vessels to follow, and they had to be abandoned. Among these were the four Russian AGs in Hanko. The arrival of German troops under Rüdiger von der Goltz on 3 April forced the Russians to hastily scuttle the submarines, including AG 12 and AG 16, in Hanko harbour.

The Finns located and raised the two boats. Extensive plans were made to refurbish them, but the strained economic situation of the 1920s and the new shipbuilding program of the 1930s finally led to their scrapping.

The Soviet Navy renamed their remaining five AGs A class, and all saw major modernization in the late 1930s. Two of the class were sunk during World War II: A-1 was scuttled by Soviets to prevent capture on 26 June 1942, A-3 was sunk by a German anti-submarine ship. The most significant victory of this old class of submarine was the sinking of Romanian merchant SS Sulina (3495 GRT) achieved by the same A-3.

== Boats of the class ==
=== Baltic Fleet ===
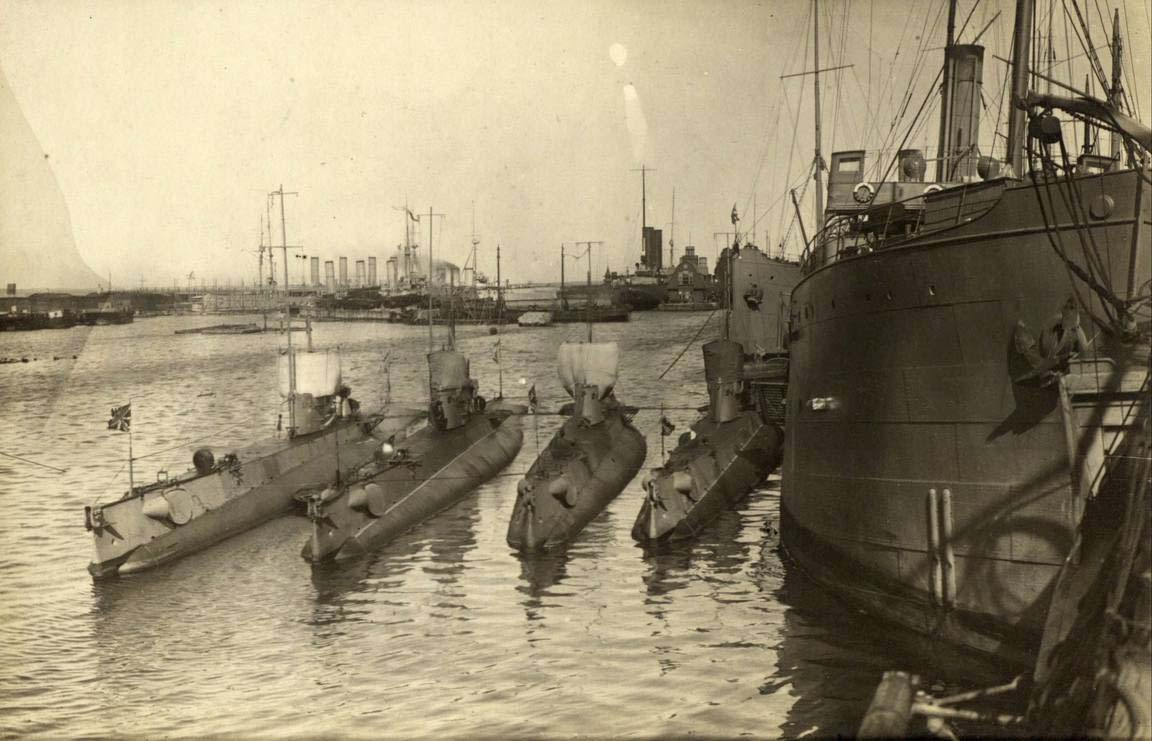
AG-11, AG-12, AG-15, AG-16 and submarine tender Oland

- AG-11 (scuttled at Hanko, 3 April 1918)
- AG-12 (scuttled at Hanko, 3 April 1918, raised by the Finns and later scrapped)
- AG-14 (sunk in September 1917 in Baltic Sea, discovered in 2003)
- AG-15 (sunk in June 1917, raised, scuttled at Hanko, 3 April 1918)
- AG-16 (ex AG-13, scuttled at Hanko, 3 April 1918, raised by the Finns, scrapped in 1929)

=== Black Sea Fleet ===
- AG-21 (fell into German and later British hands, scuttled 24 April 1919 in Sevastopol. Later raised by the Soviets and renamed A-5)
- AG-22 (interned with Wrangel's fleet in 1921 at Bizerta and eventually scrapped)
- AG-23 (later A-1; scuttled 26 June 1942 in Sevastopol. Raised in 1945 and scrapped)
- AG-24 (later A-2 and M-52)
- AG-25 (later A-3; lost to unknown cause after 28 October 1943)
- AG-26 (later A-4)

== Bibliography ==
- Building Submarines for Russia in Burrard Inlet by W.Kaye Lamb published in BC Studies No.71 Autumn, 1986
- Polmar, Norman & Noot, Jurrien (1991). Submarines of the Russian and Soviet Navies, 1718–1990. Naval Institute Press. ISBN 0-87021-570-1.
- Watts, Anthony J. (1990). The Imperial Russian Navy. Arms and Armour. ISBN 0-85368-912-1.
