= Segelföreningen i Björneborg =

Finnish yacht club

Coordinates: 61.593762°N 21.463412°E

- Emblem

- Burgee

- Ensign
- Short name: BSF
- Founded: 26 January 1856; 169 years ago
- Location: Kallo, Pori
- Commodore: Pekka Koskenkorva
- Website: http://www.bsf.fi/

Segelföreningen i Björneborg (BSF) is a yacht club from Pori, Finland.

== History ==
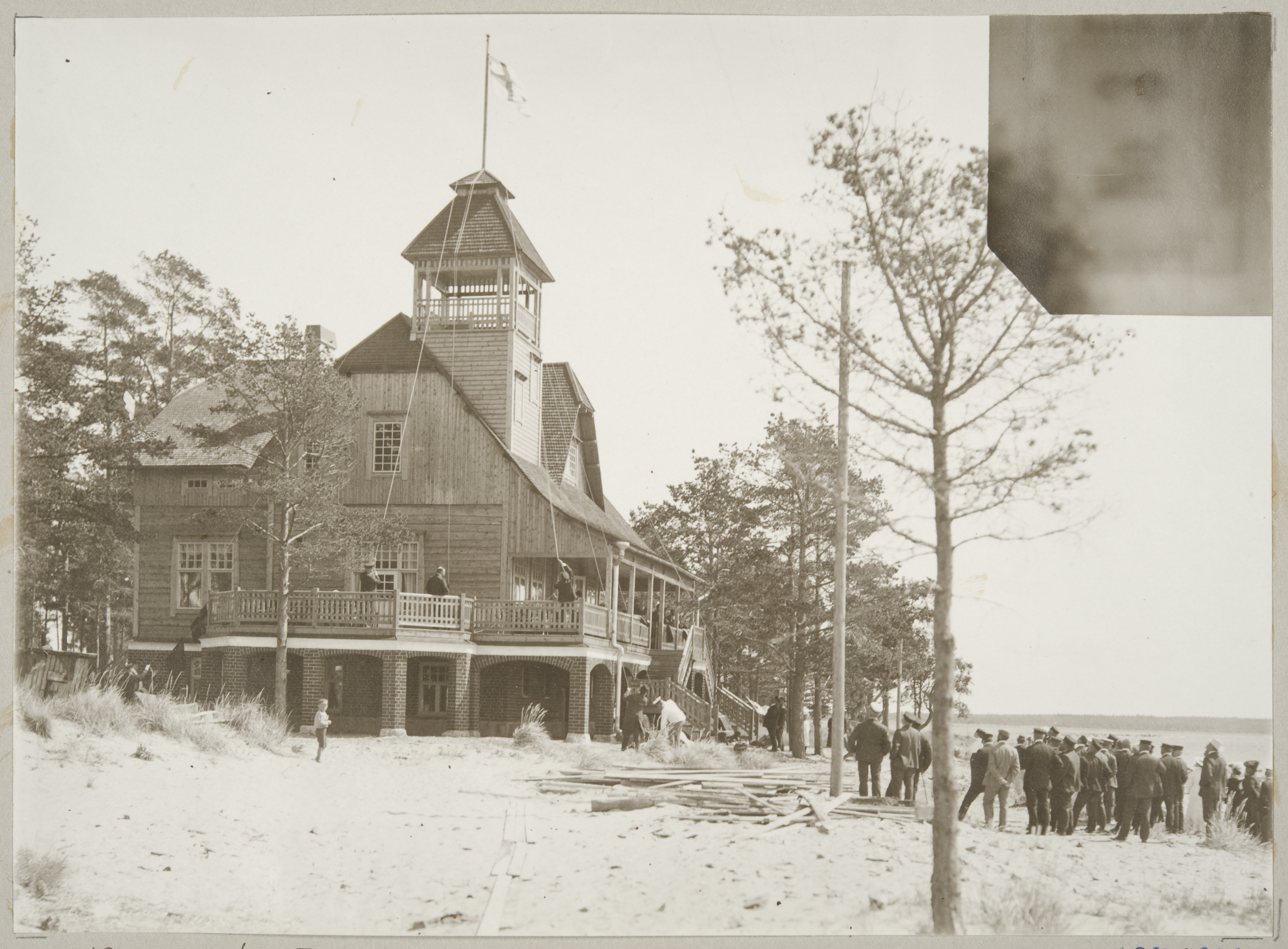
The first clubhouse in Mäntyluoto c. 1905

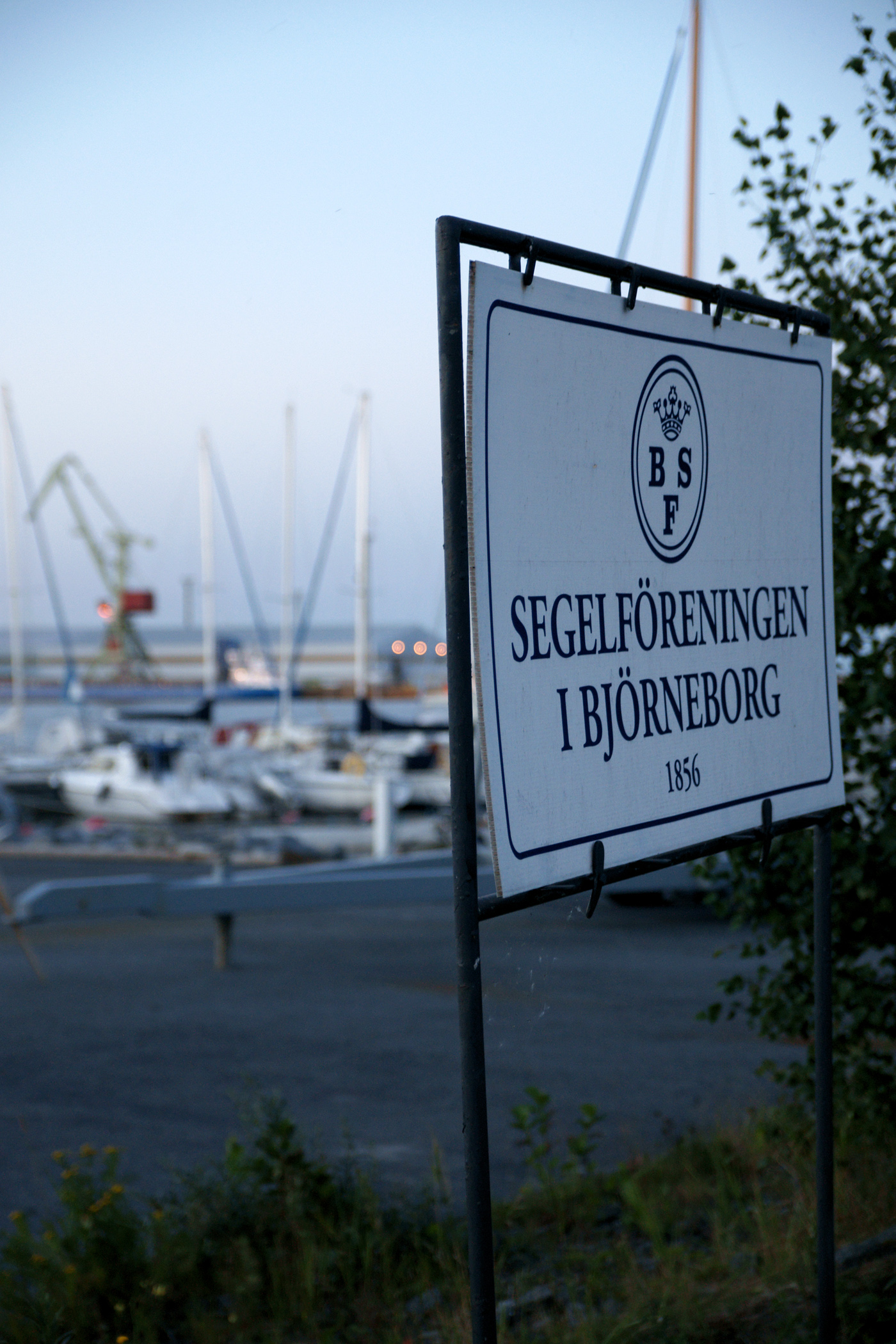
BSF sign in Kallo

BSF was established by Gustaf Sohlström on 26 January 1856 and it is the oldest sports club in Finland. The initial clubhouse was located at Ulvila, and later moved to Lotsbacken. In 1905, a new clubhouse was built in Mäntyluoto, to be destroyed during the Continuation War. Mäntyluoto is by the Port of Pori, adjacent to the Kallo Lighthouse, some 20 kilometres northwest of the city.

The club hosted the 2006 Snipe European Championship, and again in 2018.
