= AG11 =

AG11 may refer to:

- Russian submarine AG-11
- SR58 (battery)
