= AG12 =

AG12 may refer to:

- Russian submarine AG-12
- AG12 (battery)
