= Yyteri =

District and a beach in Pori, Finland

Coordinates: 61°34′00″N 021°32′00″E

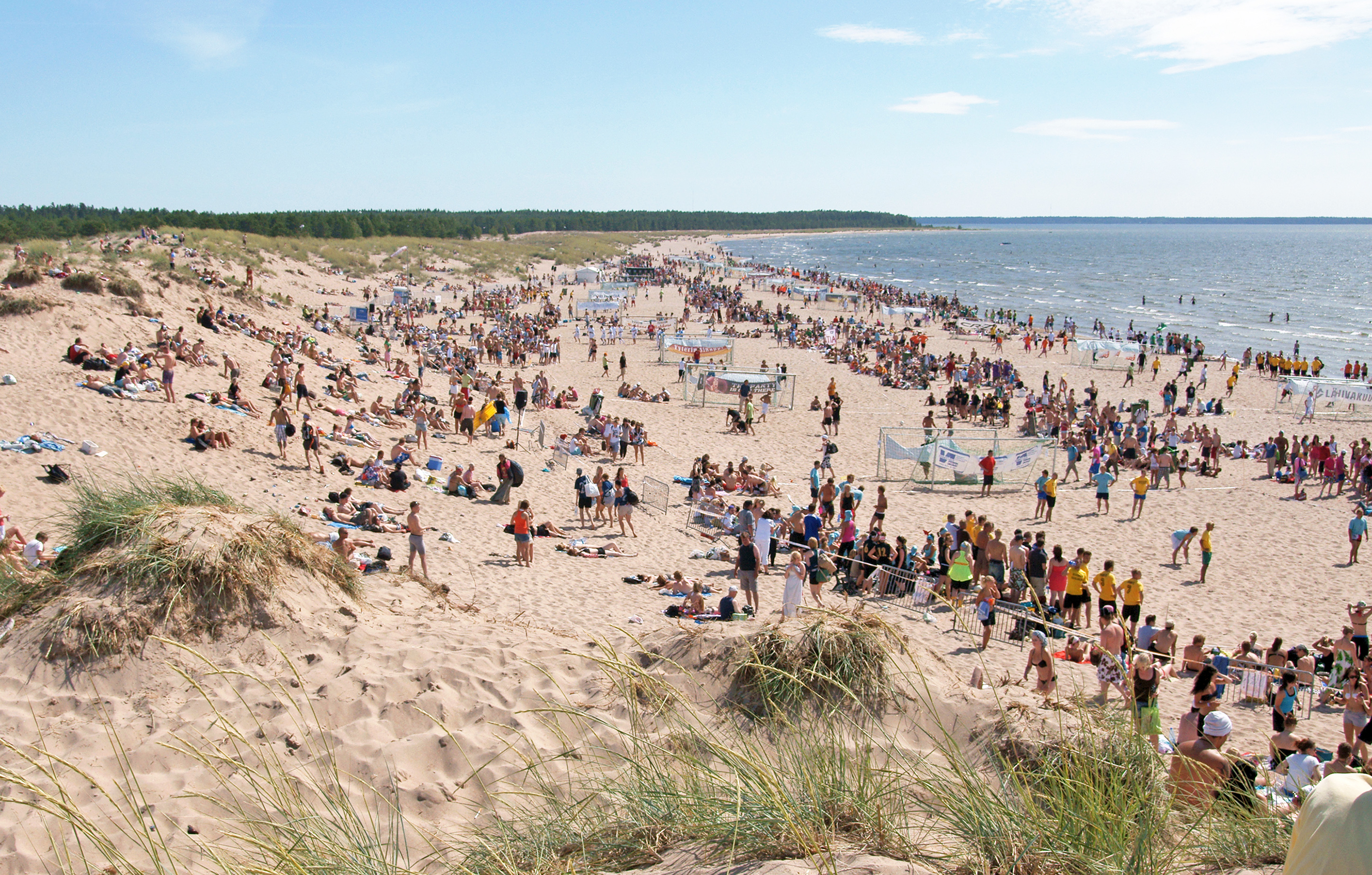
Yyteri Beach

Yyteri (Finnish: [ˈyːteri]; Swedish: Ytterö) is a district and a beach in the city of Pori, Finland. It is located about 17 kilometres (11 mi) from the centre, bordering the Baltic Sea. The distance from Helsinki to Yyteri is about 260 kilometres (160 mi) and it takes more than three hours to get there by car mainly along Highway 2. Yyteri is not an urban district, instead it is mostly like a holiday resort.

== Yyteri Beach ==
Yyteri is famous for its beach, which stretches for about six kilometres. It is very popular among both local people and people from elsewhere in Finland. The beach is one of the longest in Finland and all of Nordic countries, and has also many distinctive dunes. The dune area is unique in Europe because of its size.

There was a unisex nudist area in the centre of the beach, which was a few hundred metres wide, one of only two in the entire country in Finland; however, it was closed due to complaints from concerned parents in April 2021. In 1965 Rolling Stones played their first ever Finnish concert in Yyteri.

== Other interests ==
As well as the beach, Yyteri also has a spa, hotels and a restaurant. An 18-hole golf course is located in the Yyteri area and there are also many other outdoor activities including surfing, beach volley, riding and over 30 kilometres (19 mi) of hiking routes.

Bus routes operate daily between Yyteri and the centre of Pori.

The well-being of Yyteri's local pinetrees is threatened by Acantholyda posticalis, the control of which is being tested with roundworms in 2011.

== See also ==
- Kaanaa
- Mäntyluoto
- Kalajoki Beach
