= Reposaari =

Coordinates: 61.613171°N 21.445742°E

Reposaari Räfsö
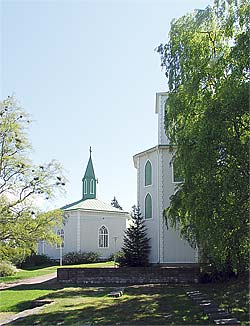
- Reposaari Church.

- Location within Finland
- Country: Finland
- Region: Satakunta
- Municipality: Pori

Population
  - Total: 722
- Time zone: UTC+2 (EET)
  - Summer (DST): UTC+3 (EEST)

Location of Reposaari in Finland

Reposaari (Swedish: Räfsö) is an island and village at the Bothnian Sea in Pori, Finland.

The island is located near the mouth of river Kokemäenjoki, 30 kilometres (19 miles) northwest of the Pori's city center. The population of Reposaari is 722. Since the 1956 the island has been connected with mainland by highway and railroad bridges.

The village of Reposaari is one of the most popular tourist attractions in Pori. It uses a grid street plan that was designed in 1874. The buildings are mainly old wooden houses from late-19th or early-20th century. One of the oldest is a hotel built in 1838. It works today as a restaurant. Reposaari has also a school, kindergarten, library, marina, camping site and a hostel. The nearest hotel is located 10 kilometres (6.2 miles) away at Mäntyluoto.

Reposaari is defined as a "Nationally Important Built Cultural Environment" by the Finnish National Board of Antiquities.

== Name ==
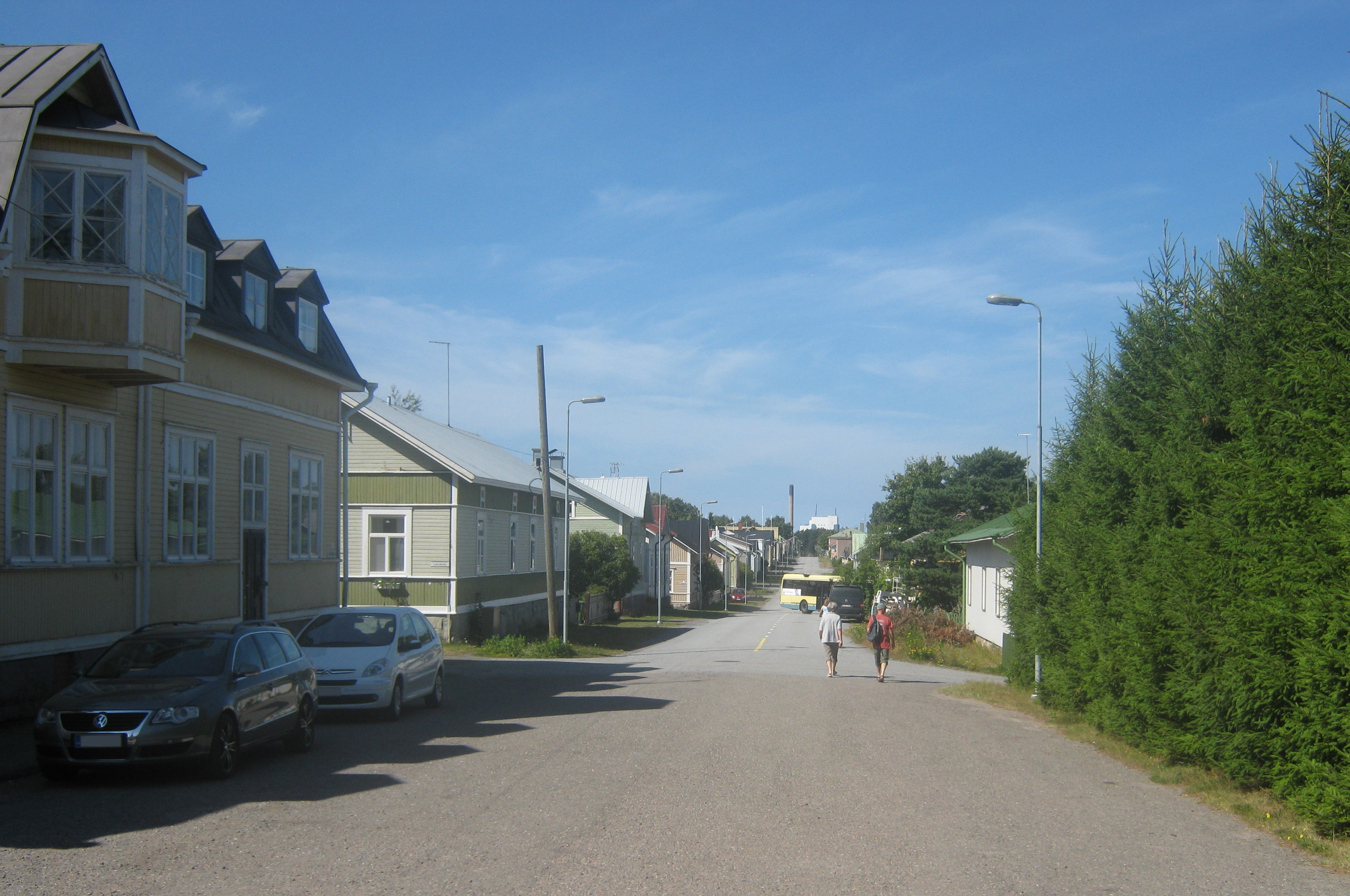
Kirkkokatu street.

Reposaari can be translated as "Fox Island". The Finnish name contains a translation error since the old Swedish name "Reffzöö" refers to word "ref" meaning reef, not "räf" which means fox.

== History ==
Reposaari has been an important harbor place since the medieval times because of its deep and protected natural harbor. It was a stage for German Hansa merchants on their way up the Kokemäenjoki river. The Port of Pori was located at Reposaari from the 18th century to the early 1900s. In the 1870s, Reposaari was the largest Finnish port in exports. Today the old harbor area works as a fishing port. During the late-19th century, Reposaari was highly industrialized. Major employers were a dockyard (Reposaaren Konepaja) and a sawmill (Reposaaren saha). They were both closed in the 1970s.

== Ballast plants ==
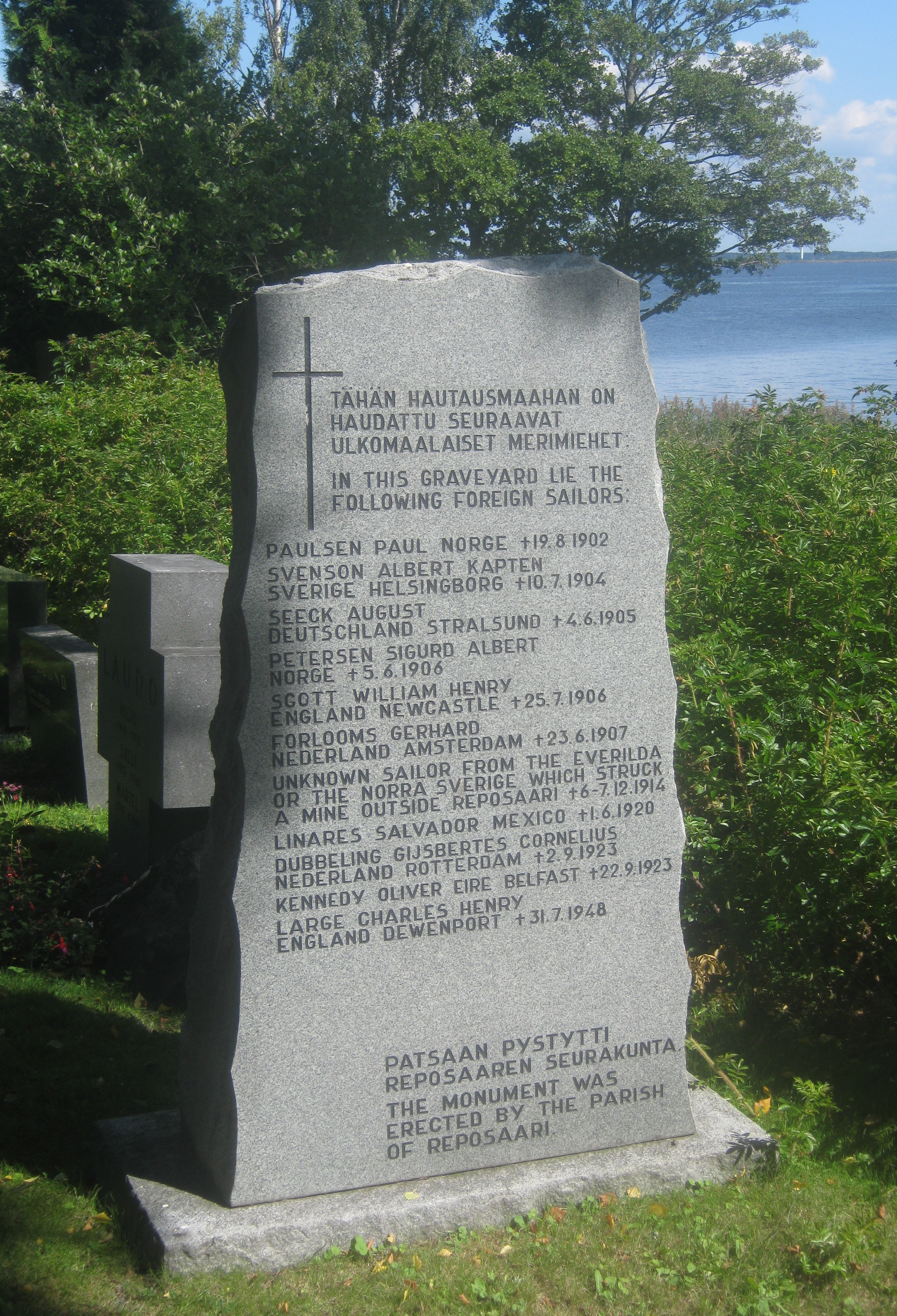
Memorial of foreign sailors at Reposaari cemetery.

Reposaari is known of its extraordinary flora. It consists of many introduced species that live outside their native distributional range. Exotic plants invaded the island during the sail ship era as the ships unloaded the sand used as a sailing ballast. More than 70 exotic species can be found today at Reposaari. Most of them are from southern parts of Baltic Sea or from the Mediterranean but some have arrived even from South America. Most common species are ones like Carduus nutans, Jacobaea vulgaris, Melilotus albus and Anchusa officinalis.

== Culture and sports ==
Reposaari is the birthplace of Finnish singer Eino Grön and musician Jussi Hakulinen who was the founding member of popular rock group Yö. The 1985 American drama film White Nights, directed by Taylor Hackford, was partly shot at Reposaari.

Most famous athlete from Reposaari is the 1952 Olympic gold medal wrestler and later member of Finnish Parliament Kelpo Gröndahl. Local football club Reposaaren Kunto (ReKu) plays in Vitonen, which is the sixth level of Finnish football.

== Sights ==
=== Church and cemetery ===
Reposaari Church is a wooden hexagonal church built in 1876. The belltower is octagonal. It is often said representing a "Norwegian style" architecture. On the churchyard is the memorial of torpedo boat S2. The boat sank outside Reposaari during a fierce storm in October 1925, taking down 53 men with her. The memorial is a work by Finnish sculptor Wäinö Aaltonen. The church was the venue for the wedding of Finnish President Sauli Niinistö.

Reposaari cemetery is located by the church. It is the final resting place of the Olympic gold medalist Kelpo Gröndahl. There is also a grave and a memorial stone for foreign sailors who died at Reposaari.

=== Fortress ===
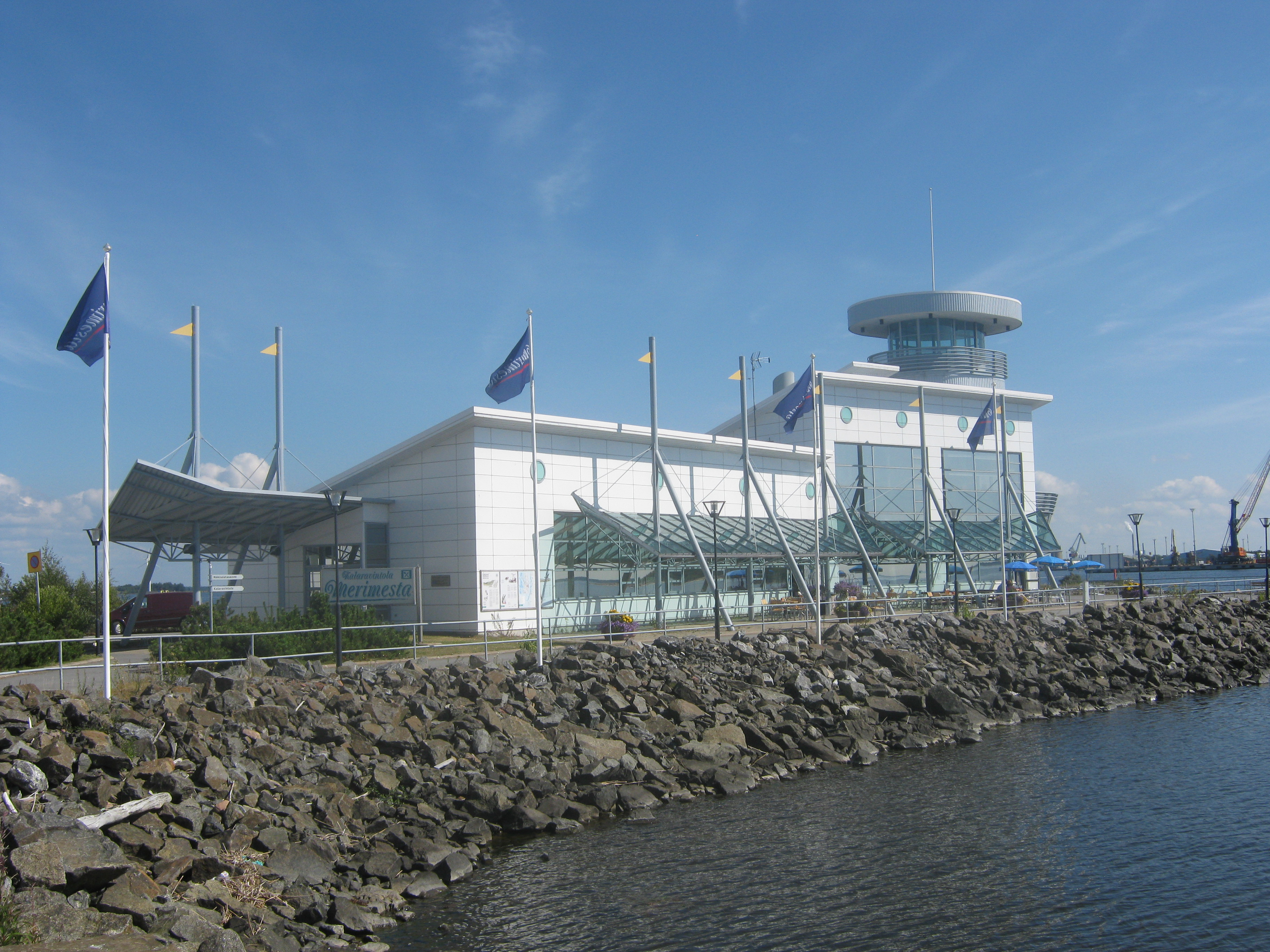
Seafood restaurant Merimesta.

Reposaari Fortress (Reposaaren linnakepuisto) is a coastal defence system built in 1935. It was used in World War II against Soviet aircraft bombing the port of Pori. The Finnish Navy owned the fortress until 1964. The area was restored in the 1990s and it is now open to the public. It consists of two Canet naval guns, dugouts, observation towers and trenches.

=== Fishing port ===
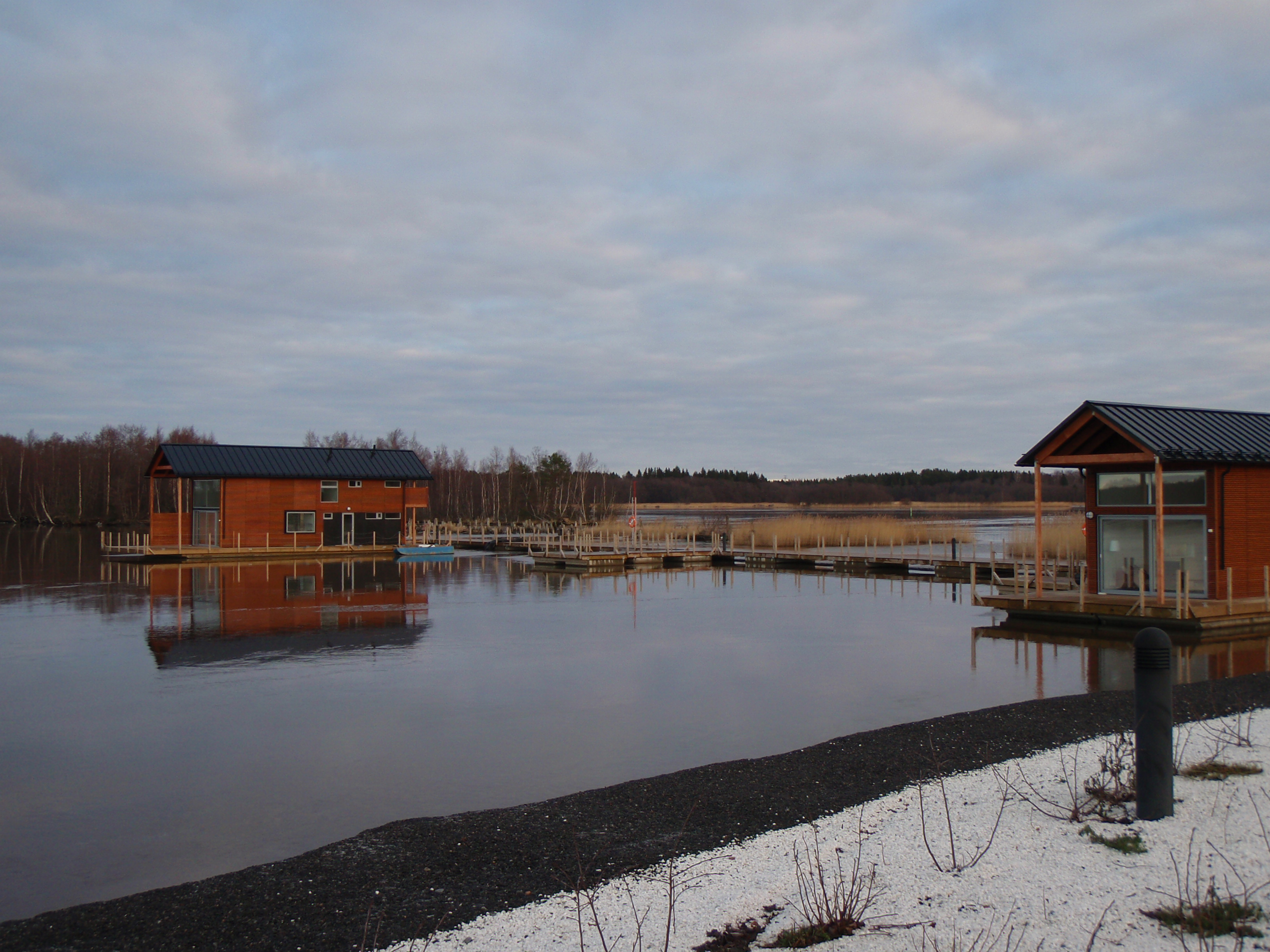
Houseboats near the Reposaari port

Reposaari fishing port was established in 1967. Today, it is the major fishing port in Finland. A fish restaurant Merimesta was opened in 2001.

== See also ==
- List of islands of Finland
