= Ice Cruise of the Baltic Fleet =

1918 military conflict on Gulf of Finland during WW I

Coordinates: 58.6167°N 20.4167°E

- Part of World War I
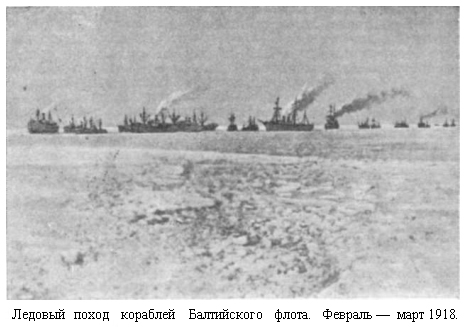
- The Ice Cruise.
Date	February–April 1918
Location	Baltic Sea
Result	Transfer of the Baltic Fleet to Soviet-controlled harbours.

Belligerents
- Russia

Commanders and leaders
- Alexey Schastny

The Ice Cruise of the Baltic Fleet (Russian: Ледовый поход Балтийского флота) was an operation which transferred the ships of the Baltic Fleet of the Imperial Russian Navy from their bases at Tallinn, at the time known as Reval (Russian: Ревель), and Helsinki to Kronstadt in 1918.

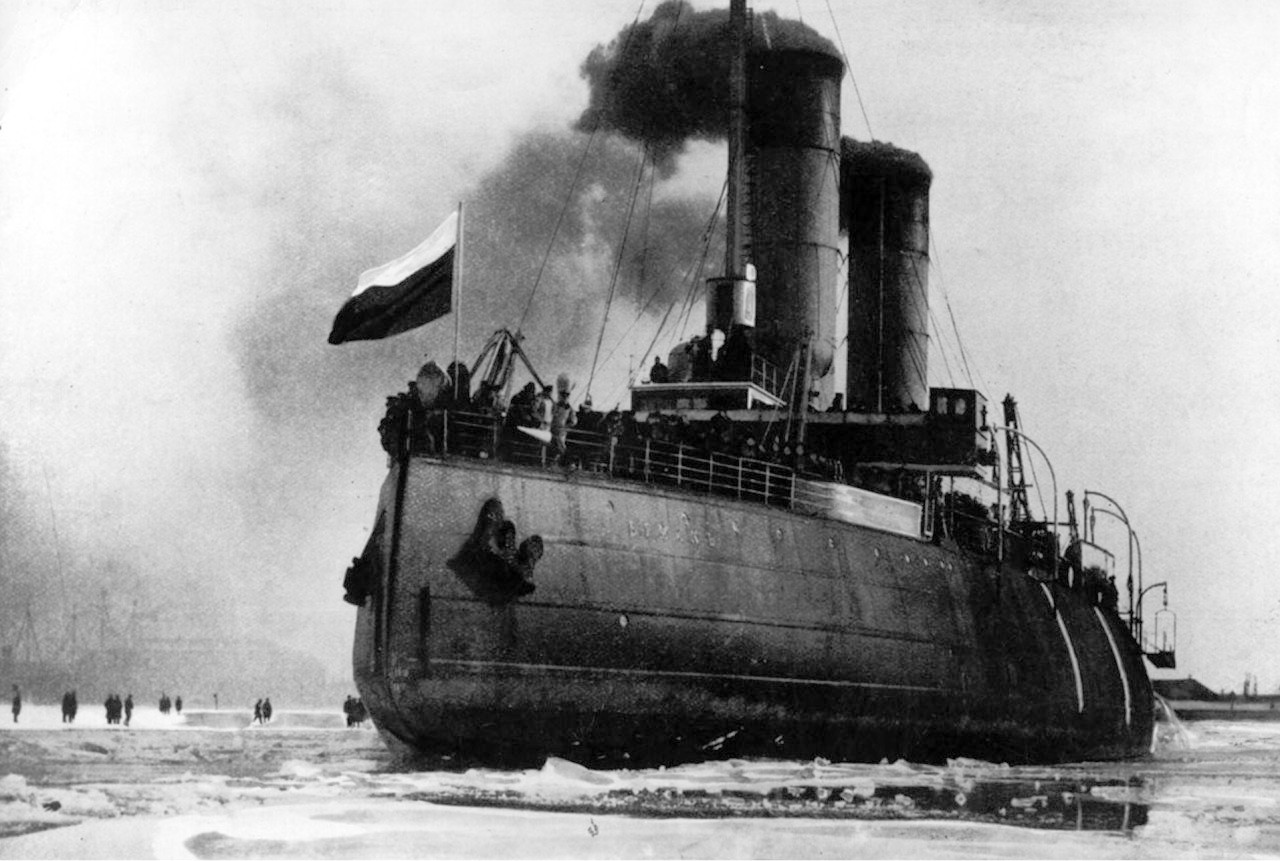
Yermak, one of the icebreakers that took part in the operation.

== Operation ==
On 17 February 1918 Vladimir Lenin ordered the ships of the Baltic Fleet to leave their bases at Tallinn and sail to Helsinki. On 19 February, due to a new German offensive, the Baltic Fleet ordered the further transfer of ships located in Helsinki to Kronstadt. On the same day ships started leaving Tallinn. A general evacuation began on 22 February, with a group of four ships, led by the icebreaker Yermak, departing for Helsinki. They were followed on 24 February by a convoy of transport ships, accompanied by two submarines, three minesweepers and a minelayer.

By the time German troops entered Reval on 25 February, most of the Russian ships had already left, escorted by the icebreakers Yermak, Tarmo and Volynets. The operation, superintended by Alexey Schastny, succeeded in evacuating the bulk of the Baltic Fleet to Helsinki, where all of the ships had arrived by 5 March, with the exception of the submarine Edinorog, which had been crushed by ice.

On 12–13 April, German forces captured Helsinki. Russian sailors scuttled four submarines in Hanko harbour on 3 April, just before the 10,000-strong German Baltic Sea Division landed in support of the White Guard. The 335 t (330 long tons) submarines—AG-11, AG-12, AG-15 and AG-16—were made by Electric Boat Co. in the United States. The German Army later returned all of the ships captured in Helsinki under the terms of the treaty of Brest-Litovsk.

All of the evacuated ships had reached Kronstadt or Petrograd by 22 April.

== Importance ==
The ships transferred included:

- Four dreadnought battleships: Gangut, Petropavlovsk, Poltava, Sevastopol
- Three pre-dreadnought battleships: Andrei Pervozvanny, Respublika, Grazhdanin
- Five armoured cruisers: Rurik, Admiral Makarov, Bayan, Gromoboi, Rossia
- Four cruisers: Bogatyr, Oleg, Aurora, Diana
- 59 destroyers
- Three gunboats: Grozyashchy, Khrabry, Khivinets
- 12 submarines
- Three minelayers
- 144 other ships

Two air force brigades and large amounts of military equipment were also transferred. The transferred ships went on to play an important role in the defence of Petrograd.

== See also ==
- Bibliography of the Russian Revolution and Civil War
- Outline of the Russian Revolution and Civil War
- Index of articles related to the Russian Revolution and Civil War
- The "Russian" Civil Wars, 1916–1926: Ten Years That Shook the World
- Russia in Flames: War, Revolution, Civil War, 1914–1921
- Russia in Revolution: An Empire in Crisis, 1890 to 1928
- Russia: Revolution and Civil War, 1917—1921
- The Russian Revolution: A New History

== Citations and references ==
=== Cited sources ===
- Fock, Harald (1989). Z-vor! Internationale Entwicklung und Kriegseinsätze von Zerstörern und Torpedobooten 1914 bis 1939 (in German). Vol. 1. Koehler. ISBN 9783782202077.
