= S-class torpedo boat =

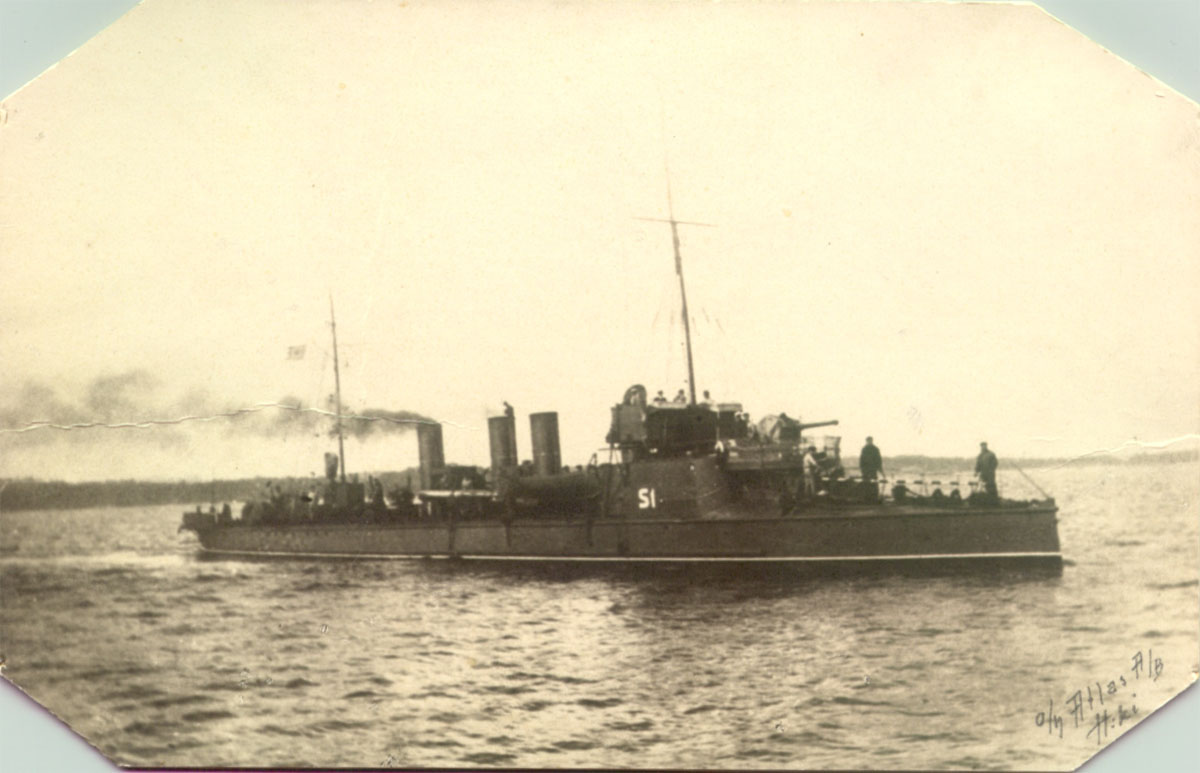
- Torpedo boat S1

Class overview
- Name: S

General characteristics
- Type: Torpedo boat
- Displacement: 290 tons (S1-S5); 186 tons (S6)
- Length: 57.9 m (190.0 ft) (S1-S5); 52.35 m (171.75 ft) (S6)
- Beam: 5.6 m (18.4 ft) (S1-S5); 5.25 m (17.22 ft) (S6)
- Draught: 1.7 m (5.6 ft) (S1-S5); 1.47 m (4.82 ft) (S6)
- Propulsion: 2 × steam engines, 4 Yarrow boilers; 3,800 hp (2,834 kW)
- Speed: 27 knots (50 km/h; 31 mph) (S1-S5); 26 knots (48 km/h; 30 mph) (S6)
- Range: 550 nmi (1,019 km; 633 mi) at 15 knots (28 km/h; 17 mph) (S1-S5)
- Complement: 53 (S1-S5); 32 (S6)
- Armament: S1-S5: 2 × 75 mm/50; 2 × 456 mm torpedo tubes; 2 × machine guns; 14-18 mines; S6: 3 × 47 mm; 2 × 380 mm torpedo tubes; 14-18 mines

The Finnish S-class torpedo boats was a series of six ex-Russian torpedo boats that had been taken over by the Finns after the Russian Revolution and the Finnish Civil War.

S1 through S5 belonged to the Russian Sokol-class torpedo boat destroyers, while S6 was of the smaller Modified Ussuri class (also called Modified Sungari class) torpedo boats.

== Ships of the class ==
S1
ex-Ryaniy (Рьяный = eager) and ex-Sova (Сова = owl); shipyard number: 112) was a Russian torpedo boat destroyer (officially was classified as a torpedo boat at first and later a squadron torpedo boat), which was taken over by the Finns after the Finnish Civil War in 1918. She was sunk as a training target in 1930.
S2
ex-Prozorlivij (Прозорливый = sharp) and ex-Gagara (Gagara = loon) in Russian service. Taken over by the Finns after the Finnish Civil War in 1918. Lost in a storm on 4 October 1925, with the loss of all hands.
S3
ex-Poslushniy (Послушный = obedient) and ex-Korshun (Коршун = Kite) in Russian service; shipyard number: 101) was taken over by the Finns after the Finnish Civil War in 1918. The ship was returned to Soviet Russia in 1922 in accordance to the Tartu peace treaty of 1920. She was scrapped in 1925.
S4
ex-Rezviy (Резвый = frisky) and ex-Voron (Ворон = raven) in Russian service; shipyard number: 109) was taken over by the Finns after the Finnish Civil War in 1918. The ship was returned to Soviet Russia in 1922 in accordance to the Tartu peace treaty of 1920. She was scrapped in 1925.
S5
ex-Podvishniy (Подвижный = mobile) and ex-Albatros (Альбатрос = albatros; shipyard number: 99) was taken over by the Finns after the Finnish Civil War in 1918. She was used as a decoy target during the Continuation War and was anchored at Pellinge. She was scuttled in shallow water (so that the deck still was above the surface) and a large number of anti-aircraft guns were scattered on the nearby islands. In this manner the Finns hoped to lure the Soviet Air Forces to attack the Finnish coastal defence ship Väinämöinen. No aircraft were however sent there.
S6
ex-Torpedo boat № 212 (Миноносец No. 212) was a Russian seagoing torpedo boat (officially was classified as a torpedo boat), which acted as a minesweeper during World War I. She was taken over by the Finns after the Finnish Civil War in 1918 and returned to Soviet Russia in 1922 in accordance to the Tartu peace treaty of 1920. The S6 was not of the same class as the other S-boats, but of the smaller Modified Ussuri class.

== Sources ==
- Afonin, N. N.; Balakin, S. A. (2004). Миноносцы типа "Сокол" ["Sokol"-Class Torpedo Boats]. «Morskaia kollektsiia» (in Russian). Saint Petersburg: «Modelist-Konstruktor».
- Joutsi, Juha (September 2021). "The Sokol Class Torpedo Boats in Finnish Service". Warship International. LVIII (3): 206–214. ISSN 0043-0374.
