= Kallo Lighthouse =

Lighthouse in Finland

Kallo Lighthouse Kallo
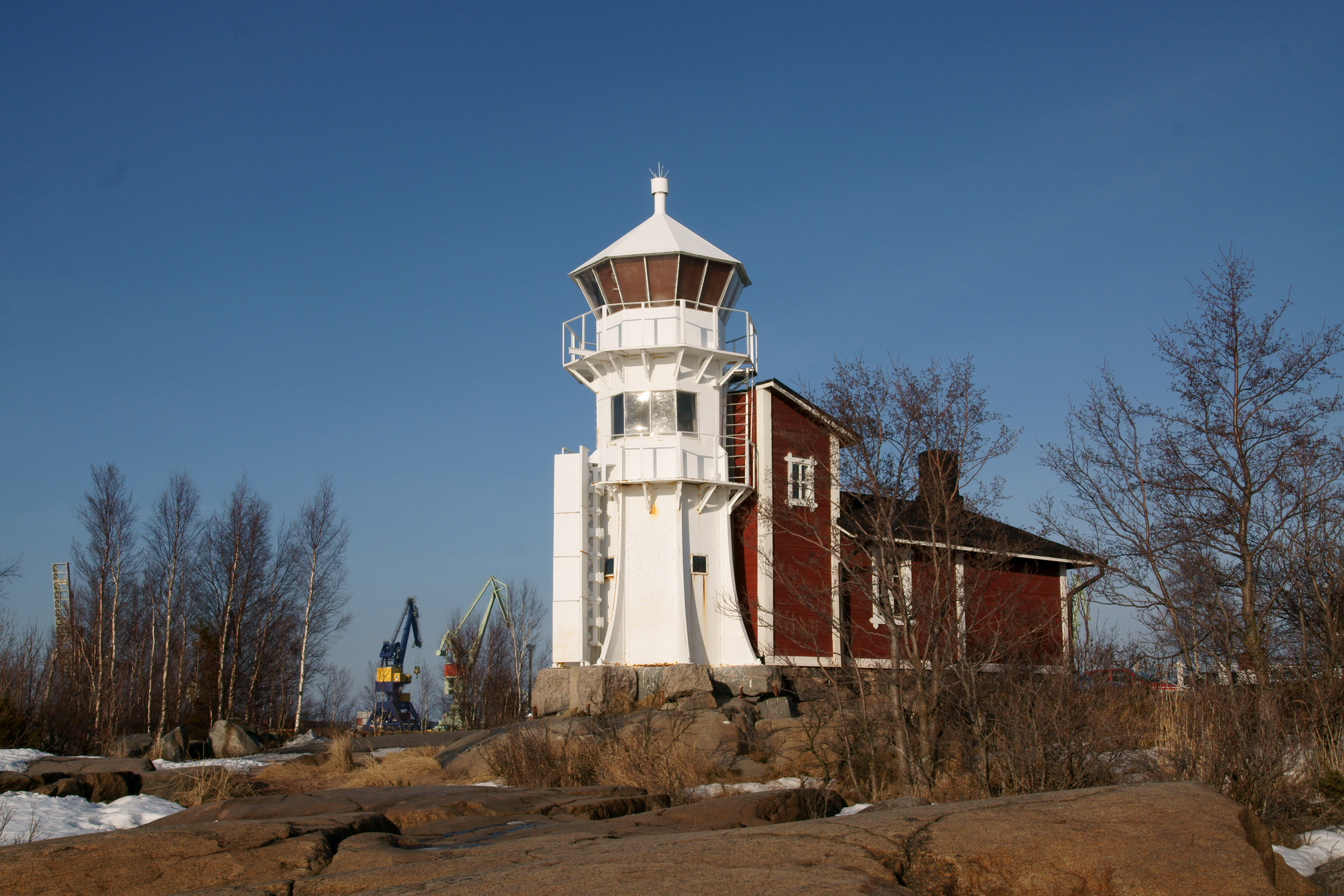
- Kallo Lighthouse in 2010
- Location: Bothnian Sea
- Coordinates: 61.594595°N 21.462286°E

Tower
- Constructed: 1884
- Construction: Iron
- Height: 8 m (26 ft)
- Markings: White

Light
- First lit: 1903
- Focal height: 14 m (46 ft)
- Range: 9.4 nmi (17.4 km; 10.8 mi)
- Characteristic: Iso WRG 2s

Kallo Lighthouse (Finnish: Kallon majakka) is a Finnish lighthouse located near the island of Mäntyluoto in the Bothnian Sea, primarily serving the shipping lane of the Port of Pori.

== History ==
The first lighthouse in the area was built in 1851, but destroyed only three years later as a result of the Crimean War. Its replacement took three decades to arrive, and was completed in 1885.

The current lighthouse was built in 1903, designed by a leading architect of the time, Gustaf Nyström.

== Facilities ==
The octagonal tower is constructed of iron over a granite base, and attached to it is the lighthouse keeper's accommodation made of timber.

The light source is made up of two separate lights positioned one on top of the other.

The lighthouse also features a fog horn, which was originally manually operated (hand-cranked), but was motorised in 1906.

== Milieu ==
Kallo is highly unusual among Finland's lighthouses, in that it can be reached by car, and it is therefore a popular destination for visitors.

The Mäntyluoto area, comprising mostly late 19th and early 20th-century buildings, includes in addition to the lighthouse and related facilities also the Pori pilot station, coast guard station, cafeteria, and the oldest yacht club in Finland, Segelföreningen i Björneborg. The milieu has been designated and protected by the Finnish Heritage Agency as a nationally important built cultural environment (Valtakunnallisesti merkittävä rakennettu kulttuuriympäristö).

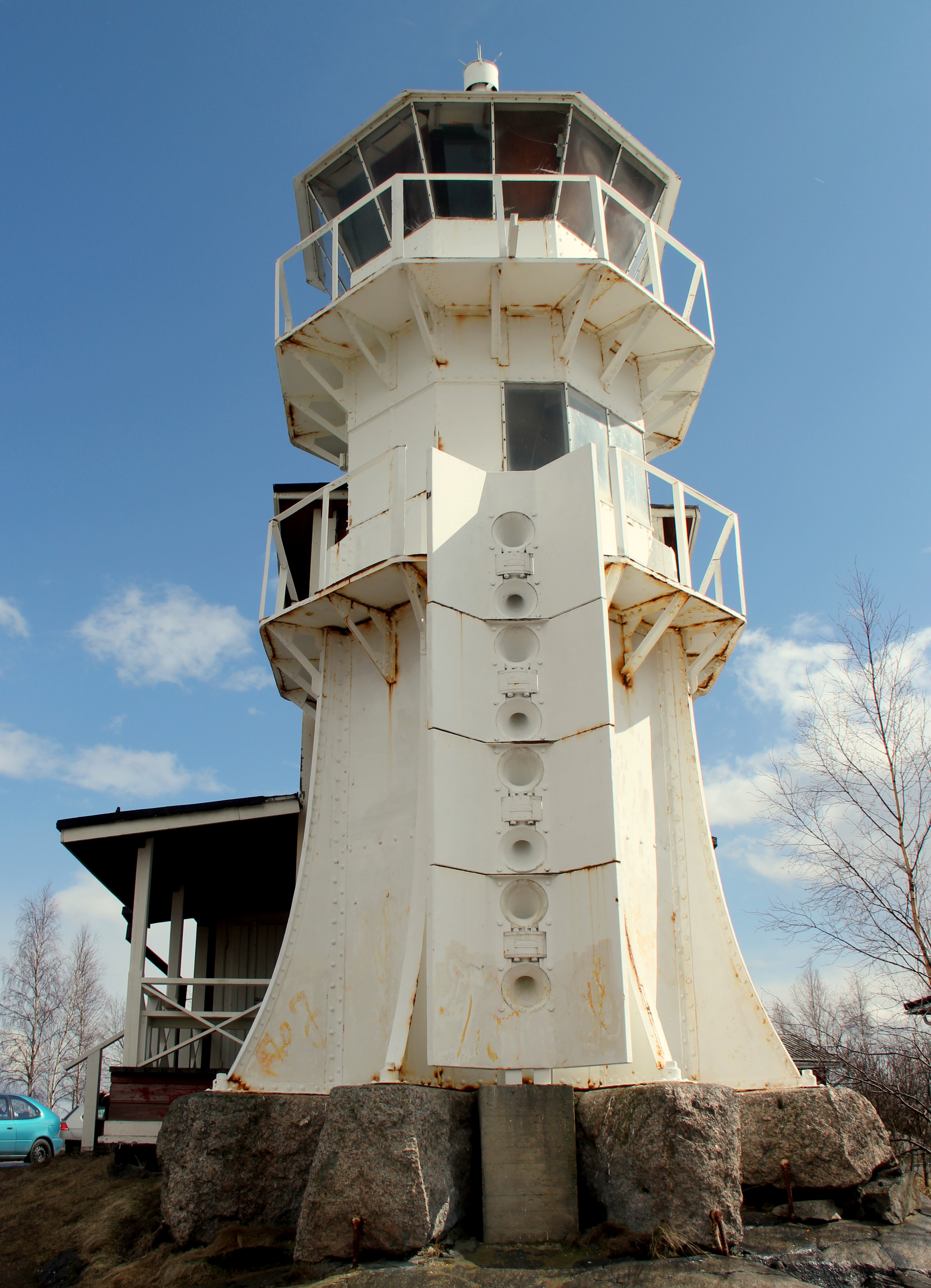
Lighthouse tower and foghorn
