= Soviet submarine A-3 =

Soviet AG-class submarine

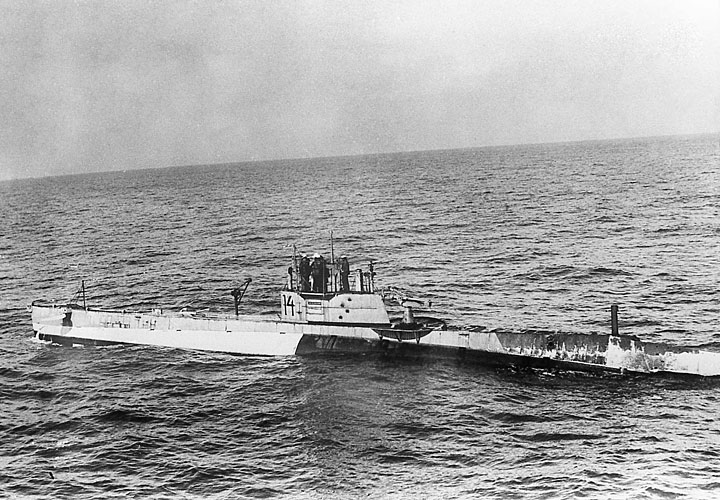
- Marxist in 1923–1924

History

(Soviet Union) → Soviet Navy
- Name: A-3 (former Marksist and AG-25)
- Namesake: Marxist
- Builder: Associated Factories And Shipyards Of Nikolayev
- Laid down: 11 July 1921
- Launched: 5 April 1922
- Completed: May 1922
- Acquired: 24 May 1922
- In service: 22 May 1922
- Out of service: 28 October 1943
- Fate: Sunk by unknown reason

General characteristics
- Class & type: A (AG)-class submarine
- Displacement: 520 t (510 long tons) submerged
- Length: 46 m (150 ft 11 in)
- Installed power: 960 nhp (surfaced); 480 nhp (submerged)
- Propulsion: Batteries and diesel
- Speed: 14.5 knots (26.9 km/h; 16.7 mph) surfaced; 10.5 knots (19.4 km/h; 12.1 mph) submerged
- Complement: 32
- Armament: 4 × torpedo tubes (all bow); 8 × torpedoes; 1 × 4.5 cm (1.77 in) deck gun (200 rounds); 1 × machine gun

Service record
- Operations: 19 patrols
- Victories: 1 ship sunk

Soviet submarine A-3, previously called AG-25 and Marksist (Russian: Марксист, lit. 'Marxist'), was an American Holland-class submarine delivered to Russia just before the end of World War I and later commissioned into the Soviet Navy in 1922. It served in World War II and was lost at sea with all hands.

== Construction ==
AG-25 was ordered on 14 September 1916 by the Soviet Navy. She was constructed in 1922 as part of the A (AG) Class along with her four sister submarines at the Associated Factories And Shipyards Of Nikolayev shipyard. AG stands for Amerikansky Golland (American, Holland design). She was launched on 5 April 1922 and was completed on 24 May 1922. The ship was 46 metres (150 ft 11 in) long and was assessed at 520 t (512 long tons) when submerged. The engine was rated at 960 nhp when surfaced. She was also renamed a number of times to AG-25 im. tov. Trotskogo, PL-18 and Marxist before she gained name A-3.

== War career ==
A-3 became part of the Black Sea fleet of the Soviet Navy at the start of the Second World War. In total she made 19 war patrols during the conflict with some notable events. On 2 May 1942 A-3 fired a few torpedoes at the German merchant ships Arkadia and Salzburg when she was near Odessa, yet no torpedoes hit their targets. On 29 May 1942 A-3 successfully sank the Romanian merchant ship Sulina when she was off Odessa. On 11 May 1943 the A-3 fired two torpedoes at the German barges Mal 1, Mal 2, and Mal 3 when they were off Yalta, but failed to hit any of them. The following day while the submarine was near Crimea she mistakenly fired two torpedoes at the wreck of the Soviet transport ship Fabritsius which had been sunk by a German bomber aircraft on 2 March 1942.

=== Sinking ===
Although the fate of the A-3 is still uncertain, it is assumed that the submarine was sunk by depth charges on 28 October 1943 by the German auxiliary anti-submarine ship Shiff 19 at Karkinit Bay at 46°10′N 31°55′E with the loss of all 32 crew. The wreck's condition is unknown. Russian sources states, that position of attack is too far both from designated position of A-3 and from actual position of A-3, which could be en route to base. Thus a reason of loss is still disputed.

Ships sunk by A-3
Date	Ship	Flag	Tonnage	Notes
20 May 1942	Sulina	(Kingdom of Romania)	3,495 GRT	freighter (torpedo)
12 May 1943	Fabritsius	(Soviet Union)	(2,366 GRT)	wreck of freighter (torpedo)
Total:			3,495 GRT	

== Bibliography ==
- Polmar, Norman & Noot, Jurrien (1991). Submarines of the Russian and Soviet Navies, 1718–1990. Naval Institute Press. ISBN 0-87021-570-1.
