= Yermak (1898 icebreaker) =

Russian and later Soviet icebreaker

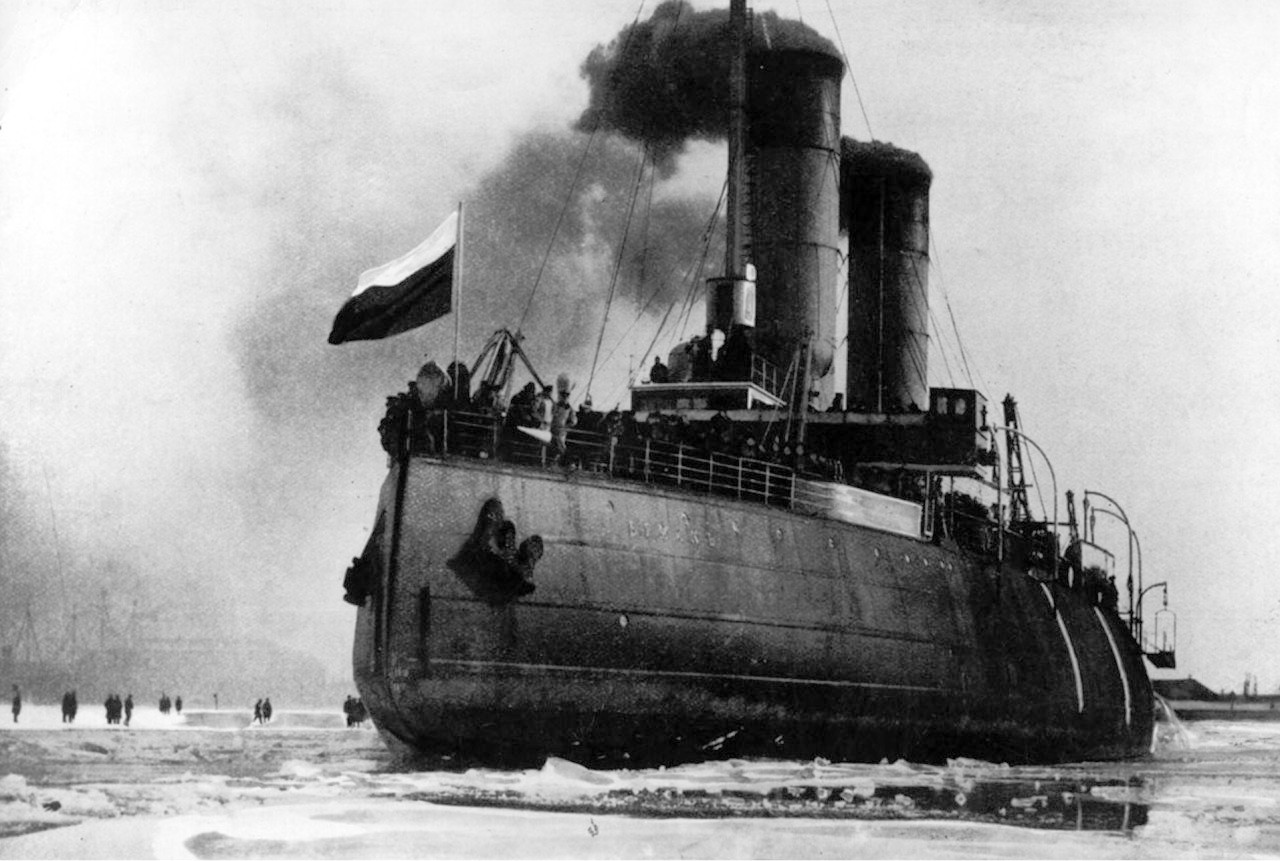
- Yermak on the Baltic Sea before 1917

History

Russian Empire/RSFSR/USSR
- Name: Yermak
- Builder: N. I. Yankovsky, R. I. Runeberg, Armstrong Whitworth and others
- Yard number: 684
- Laid down: 1897
- Launched: 17 October 1898
- Completed: 1899
- Acquired: 1899
- Out of service: 1963
- Fate: Scrapped 1964

General characteristics
- Displacement: 8730 tons
- Length: 97.5 m
- Beam: 21.6 m
- Draught: 7.3 m
- Ice class: Icebreaker
- Installed power: 9000 hp
- Propulsion: 4 shaft, 8 VTE steam engines, 6 boilers
- Speed: 12 knots
- Crew: 102

Yermak (Russian: Ермак, IPA: [Jɛrmak]) was a Russian and later Soviet icebreaker. It was the first polar icebreaker in the world, having a strengthened hull shaped to ride over and crush pack ice.

== History ==
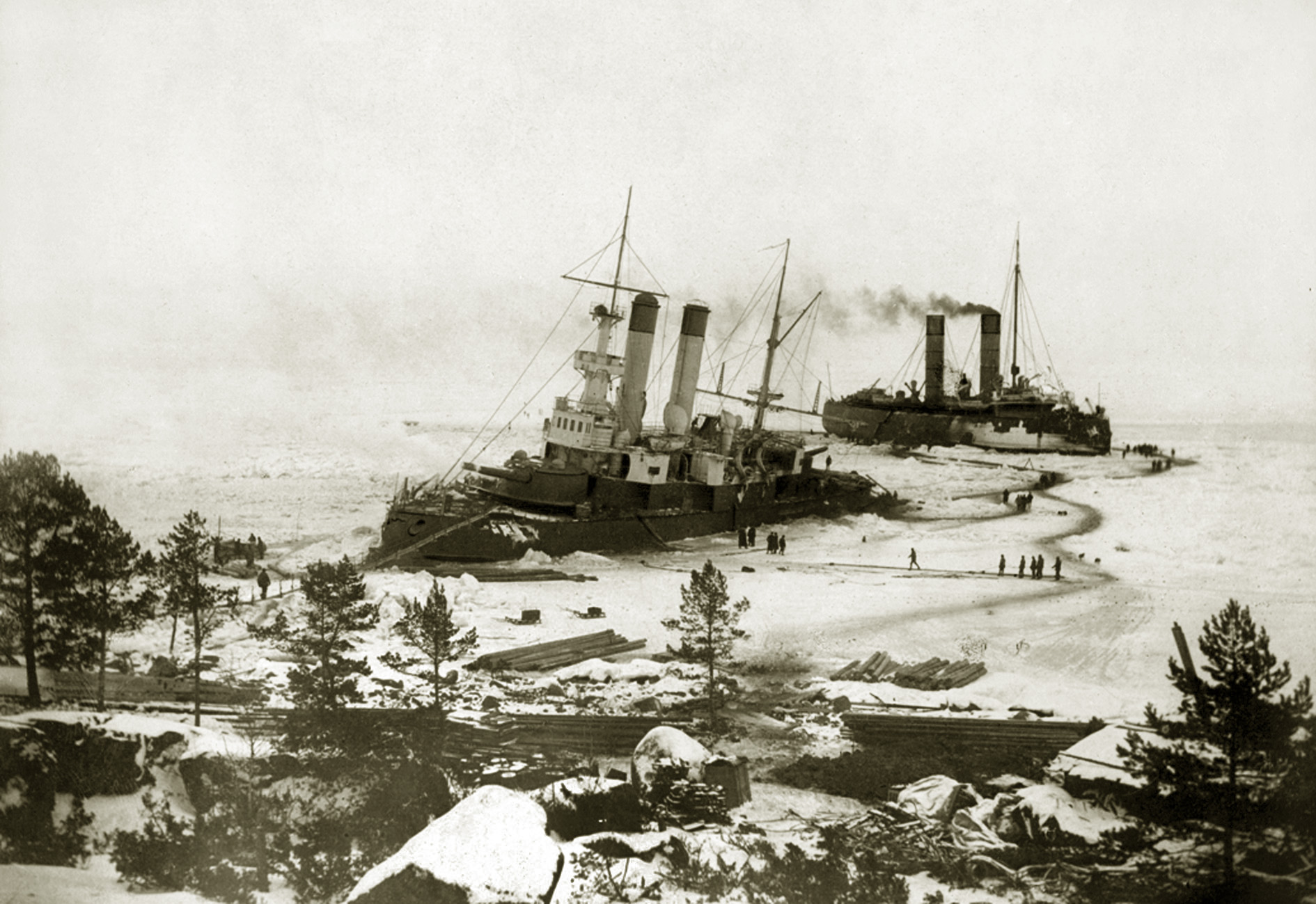
Yermak assisting the stranded warship Apraxin, 1900

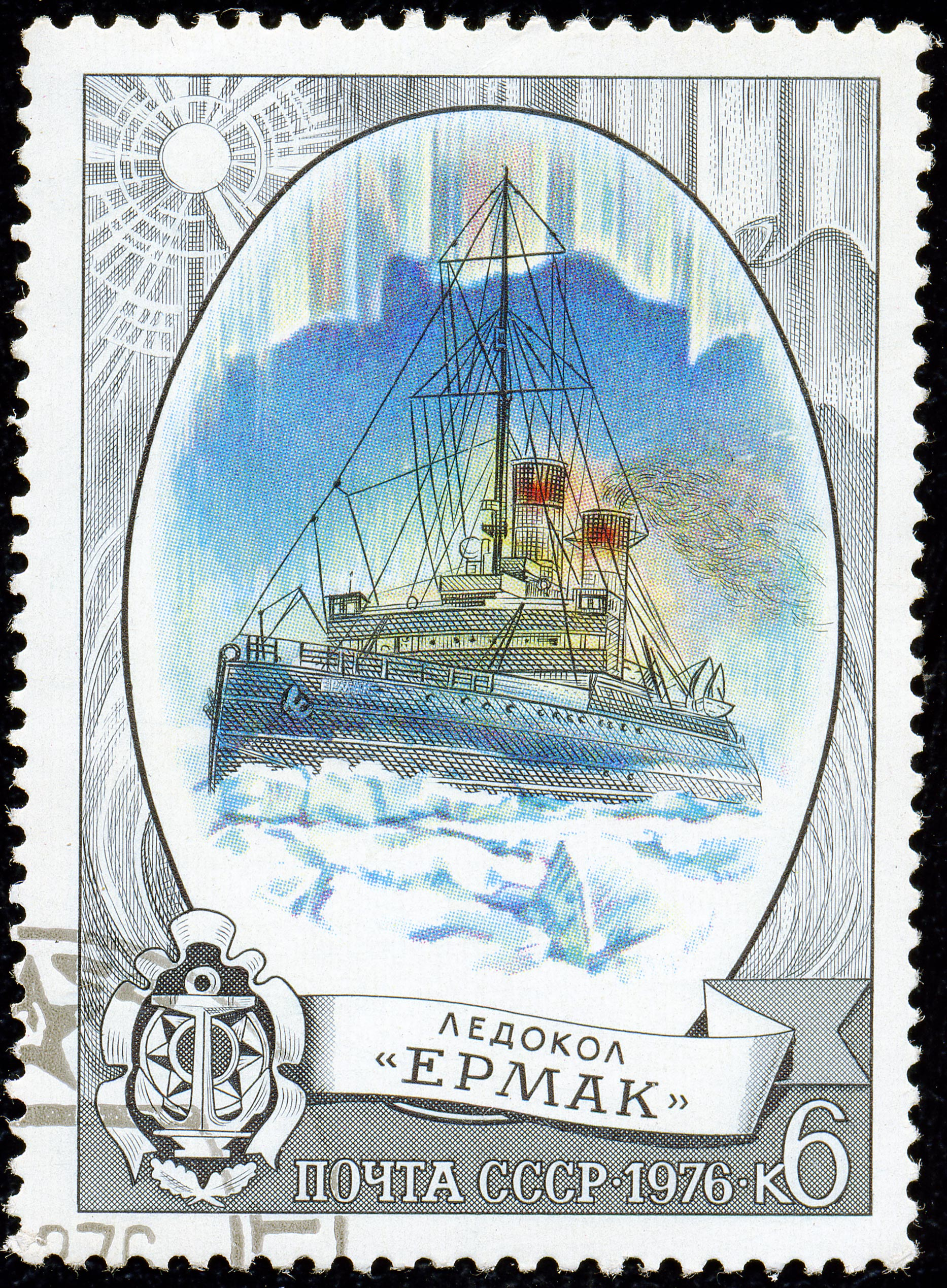
1976 Soviet postage stamp honoring the Yermak

An earlier vessel, the schooner Yermak, was commissioned for the 1862 attempt to find the Yenissei river delta by Paul Theodor von Krusenstern, by navigating from Murmansk through the Kara Sea to the destination, but was shipwrecked before obtaining success.

Yermak was built for the Imperial Russian Navy under the supervision of vice-admiral S. O. Makarov by the members of his commission, which included D. I. Mendeleev, engineers N. I. Yankovsky and R. I. Runeberg, admiral F. F. Wrangel, among others. It was built in Newcastle upon Tyne at its Low Walker yard and launched in 1898. She was named after the famous Russian explorer of Siberia, Don Cossack ataman Yermak Timofeyevich.

She was commissioned on 17 October 1898. She arrived in Kronstadt on 4 March 1899 after breaking through ice and a formal reception was held to mark her arrival. Later in 1899 she reached 81°21'N north of Spitsbergen. She had been constructed to break through heavy ice (up to 2 m in thickness).

Yermak had been used in the winter of 1899–1900 to set up the first radio communication link in Russia between Kotka and Gogland (Suursaar) island (distance 47 km). In 1900 she came to the aid of the cruiser Gromoboi which had grounded in the Baltic.

Between 1899 and 1911 Yermak sailed in heavy ice conditions for more than 1000 days.Yermak was initially part of the fleet sailing to the Battle of Tsushima but irresponsible manoeuvring resulted in shots being fired across her bow before she was dismissed from the fleet in early October 1904 O.S.

During World War I she assisted the Baltic Fleet during the Ice Cruise when the fleet was evacuated from Helsinki to Kronstadt in February 1918.

During World War II the Yermak was mobilised again and took part in the evacuation of Hanko naval base. She was armed with two 102 mm, two 76 mm, four 45 mm and four machine guns.

Yermak served with different branches of the Russian and Soviet Navy and Merchant Marine up until 1964, becoming one of the longest-serving icebreakers in the world. An island in the Nordenskiöld Archipelago was named after her.

By 1963 it was scrapped, despite efforts to preserve it as a museum piece.

A monument to the icebreaker Yermak was unveiled in Murmansk In November 1965 – this included mosaic panels and the original anchor on the pedestal.

Another icebreaker with the name Yermak was built for the Soviet Union at the Wärtsilä Helsinki shipyard, Finland in 1974. Russia employs an icebreaker named Yermak in the Baltic Sea as late as 2010.

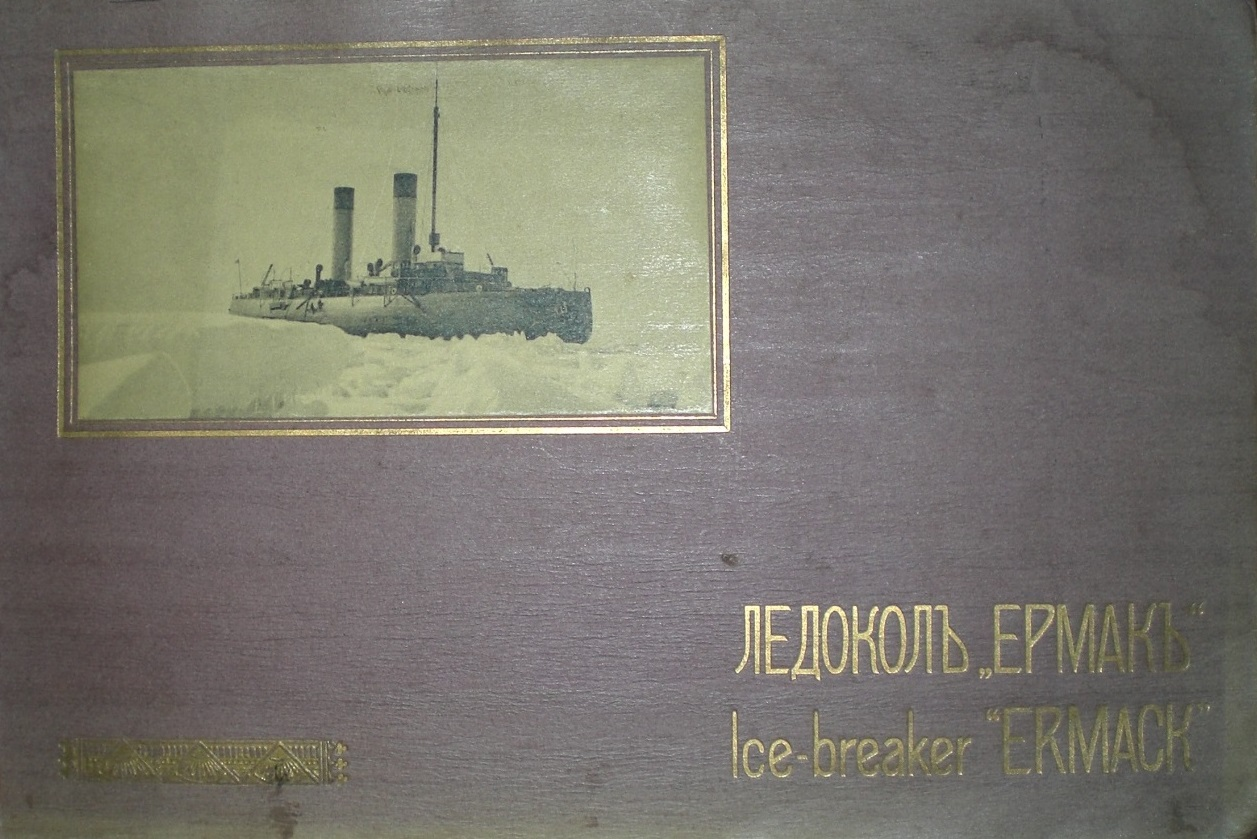
The first photographic album on Ice-breaker "Ermack"

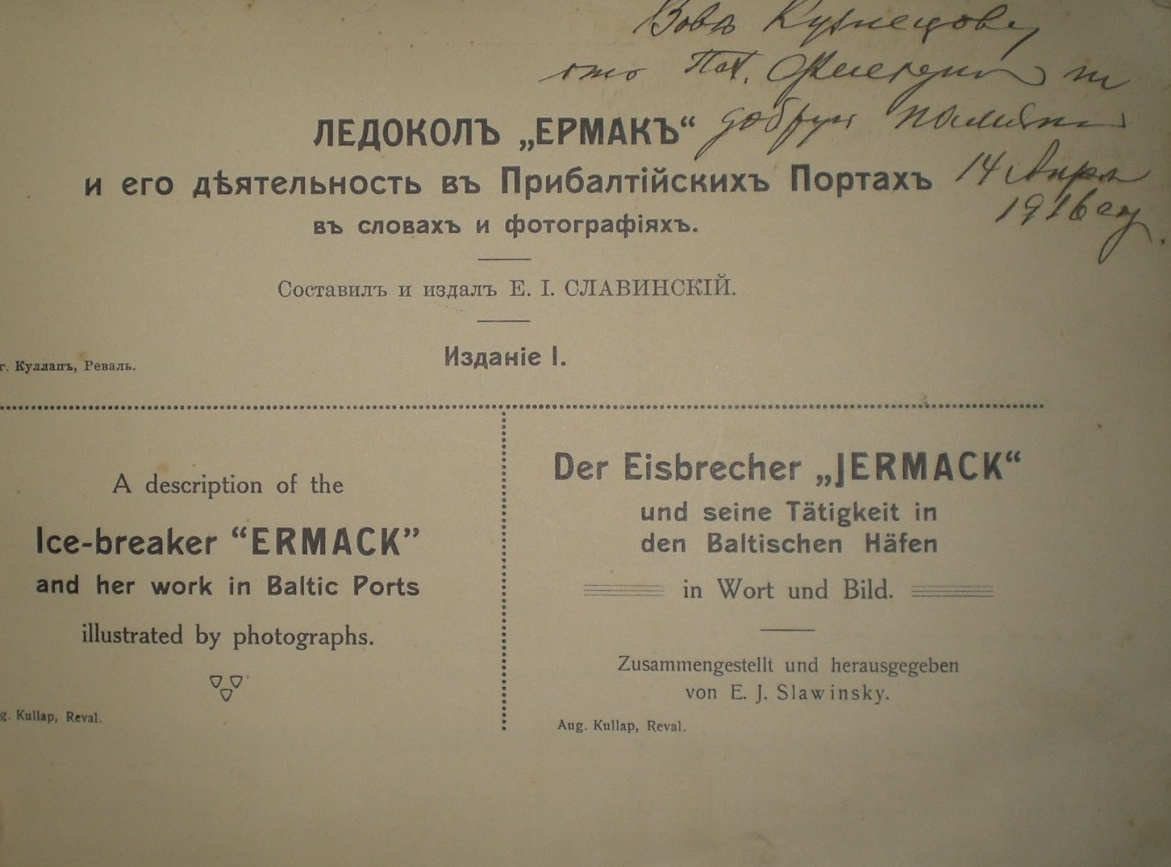
The first photographic album on Ice-breaker "Ermack" – title page
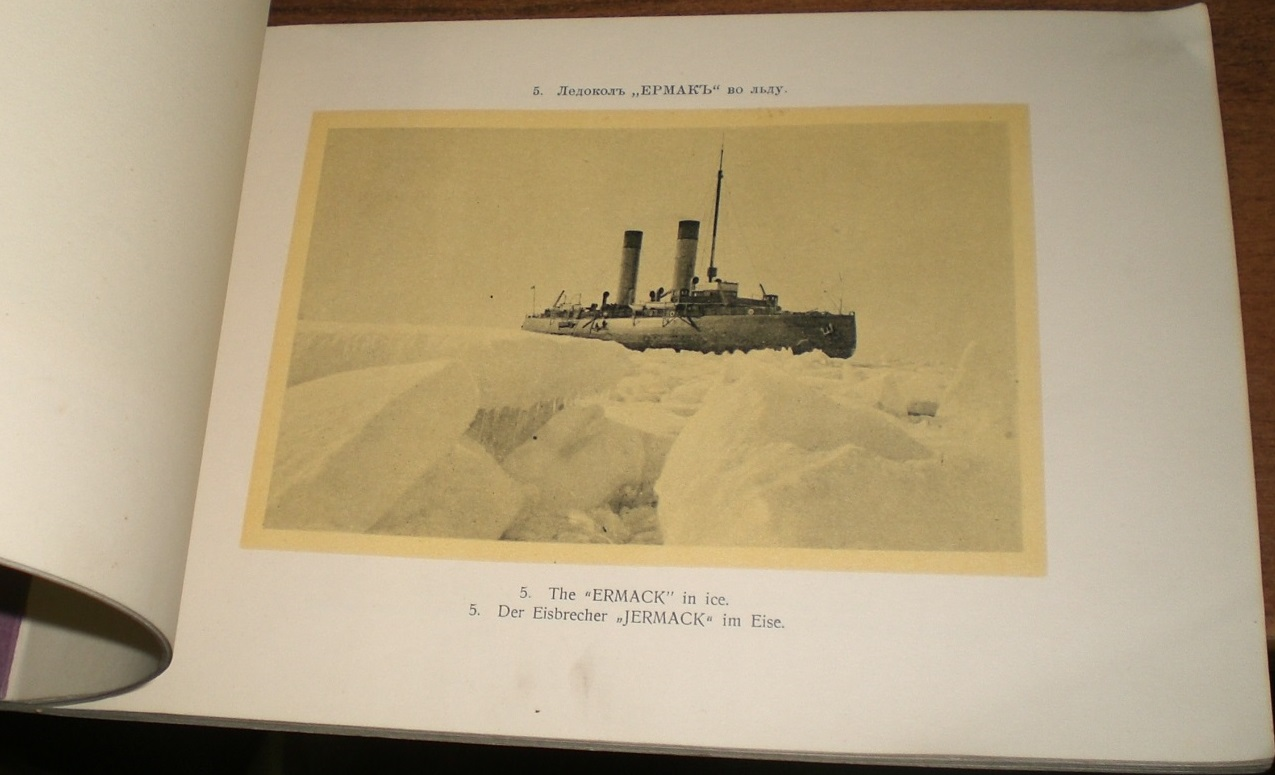
The first photographic album on Ice-breaker "Ermack" – pic. nr. 5
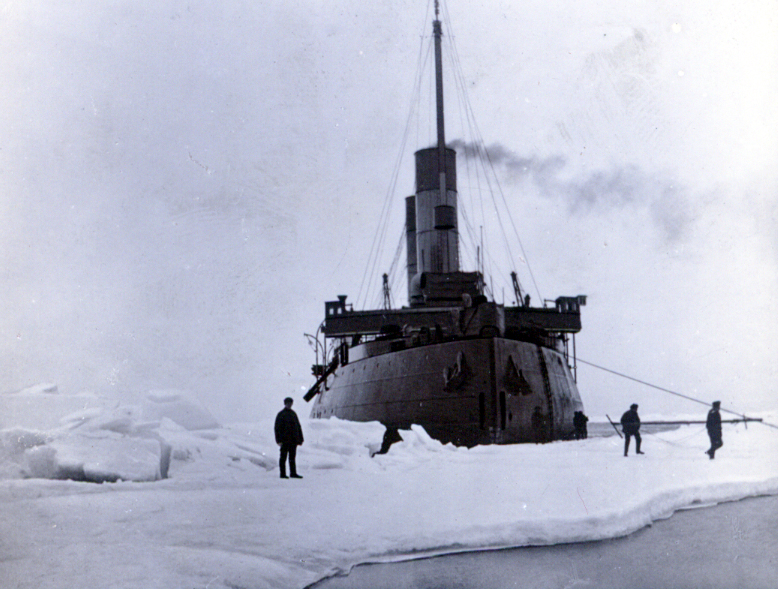

== See also ==
- Ice Cruise of the Baltic Fleet
- Alexander Stepanovich Popov
