= Kaanaa =

District in Pori, Finland

Coordinates: 61°34′36″N 21°32′18″E

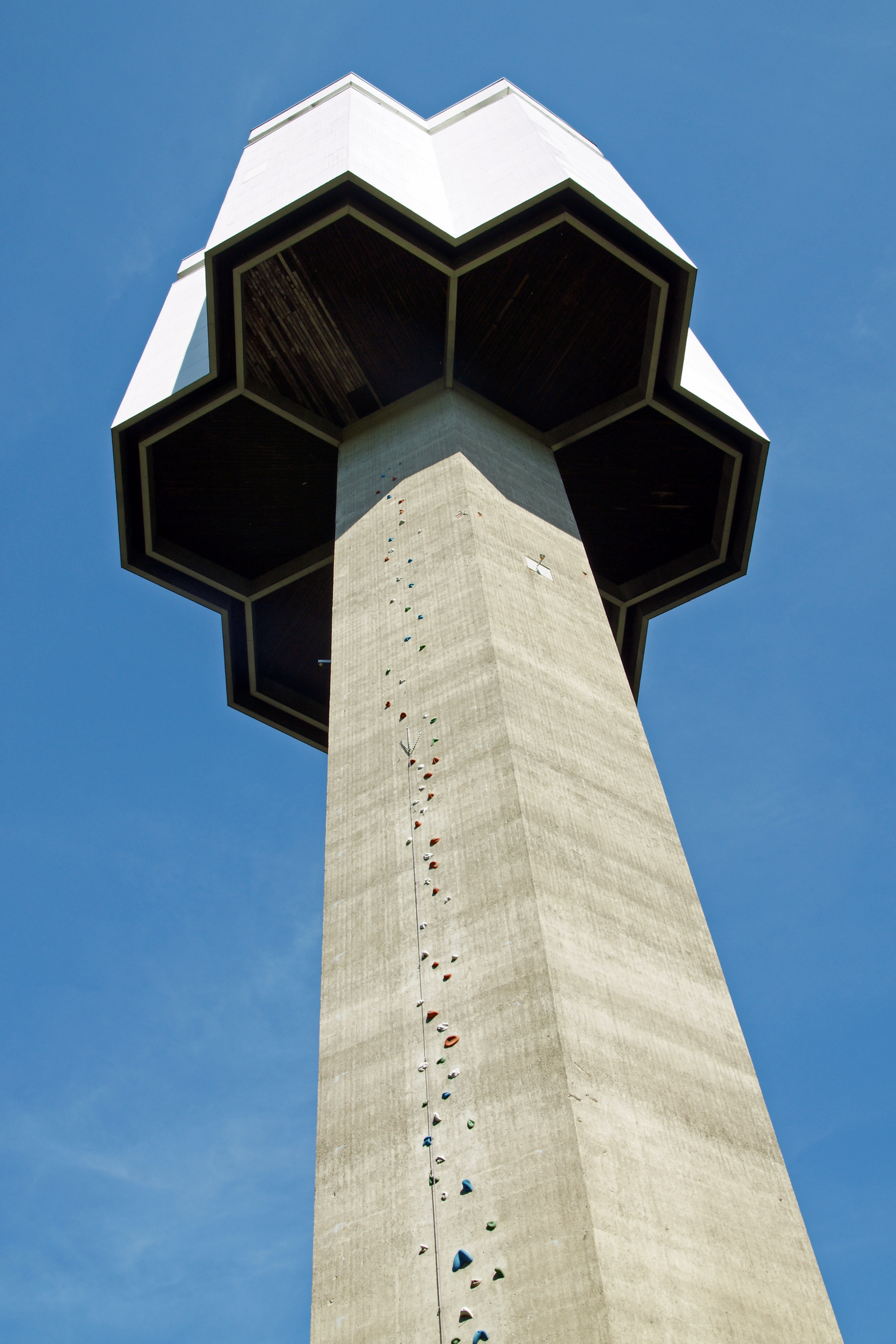
The Kaanaa Water Tower

Kaanaa (Swedish: Kanan) is a district in the Meri-Pori area, in the immediate vicinity of Yyteri Beach, in the city of Pori, Finland. The distance to the city center is about 16 kilometers. In 2013, about 647 people lived in Kaanaa. The Kaanaa's water tower also serves as a lookout tower.

== See also ==
- Mäntyluoto
