= Russian submarine AG-12 =

Russian submarine

History

Russia
- Name: AG-12
- Builder: Electric Boat Company
- Completed: 1916
- Fate: Scuttled 3 April 1918

Finland
- Name: AG-12
- Commissioned: not commissioned
- Fate: Scrapped; beyond repair

General characteristics
- Type: AG-class submarine
- Displacement: 355 long tons (361 t) surfaced; 433 long tons (440 t) submerged
- Length: 150 ft 3 in (45.80 m)
- Beam: 16 ft (4.9 m)
- Draught: 12 ft 6 in (3.81 m)
- Installed power: 2 shafts
- Propulsion: 2 diesel engines (480 bhp (360 kW)); 2 electric motors (640 hp (480 kW))
- Speed: 13 knots (24 km/h; 15 mph) (surfaced); 10.5 knots (19.4 km/h; 12.1 mph) (submerged)
- Range: 1,750 nmi (3,240 km; 2,010 mi) at 7 knots (13 km/h; 8.1 mph) (surfaced); 25 nmi (46 km; 29 mi) at 3 knots (5.6 km/h; 3.5 mph) (submerged)
- Test depth: 164 feet (50 m)
- Complement: 30
- Armament: 4 × bow 17.9-inch (455 mm) torpedo tubes; 8 torpedoes; 1 × 47-millimeter (1.9 in) gun

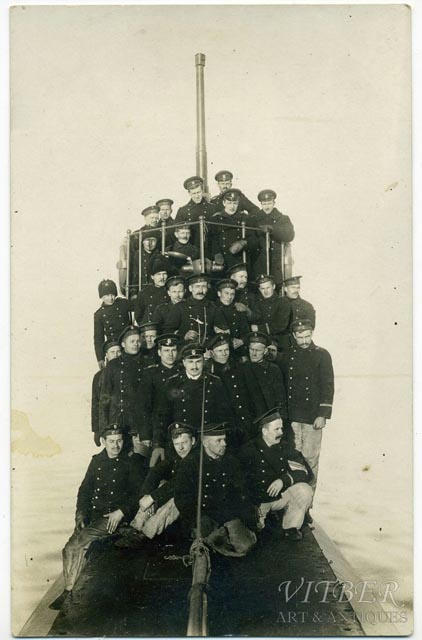
The crew of the AG-12 on the submarine's deck, spring 1917.

The Russian submarine AG-12 was an AG-class submarine, designed by the American Holland Torpedo Boat Company/Electric Boat Company, built for the Imperial Russian Navy during World War I. The submarine was fabricated in Canada, shipped to Russia and reassembled for service with the Baltic Fleet. She was scuttled by the Russians at Hanko in April 1918.

Attempts were made by the Finns to salvage the vessel: She was raised in 1918 and transferred to Turku for repair, but this proved too costly and she was scrapped.

== Description ==
AG-12 was a single-hulled submarine, with a pressure hull divided into five watertight compartments. The submarine had a length of 150 feet 3 inches (45.8 m) overall, a beam of 16 feet (4.9 m) and a draft of 12 feet 6 inches (3.8 m). She displaced 355 long tons (361 t) on the surface and 433 long tons (440 t) submerged. The AG-class submarines had a diving depth of 164 feet (50.0 m) and a crew of 30 officers and enlisted men.

The submarine had two 3-bladed propellers, each of which was driven by a 480-horsepower (360 kW) diesel engine as well as a 640-horsepower (477 kW) electric motors. This arrangement gave AG-22 a maximum speed of 13 knots (24 km/h; 15 mph) while surfaced and 10.5 knots (19.4 km/h; 12.1 mph) submerged. She had a range of 1,750 nmi (3,240 km; 2,010 mi) at 7 knots (13 km/h; 8.1 mph) while on the surface and 25 nmi (46 km; 29 mi) at 3 kn (5.6 km/h; 3.5 mph) while submerged. Her fuel capacity was 16.5 long tons (16.8 t) of fuel oil.

The AG-class submarines were equipped with four 18-inch (457 mm) torpedo tubes in the bow and carried eight torpedoes. For surface combat they had one 47-millimeter (1.9 in) deck gun.

== Construction and service ==
The Holland 602 design was widely exported during World War I and the Imperial Russian Navy ordered a total of 17, in three batches, of a version known as the American Holland-class (AG in Russian for Amerikansky Golland (American Holland)). The submarines were to be built in Canada as knock-down kits for assembly in Russia.

Components for the first batch of five submarines were assembled in Barnet, near Vancouver, Canada, and shipped to Vladivostok. There they were loaded onto the Trans-Siberian Railroad and transported to Saint Petersburg where they were assembled by the Baltic Works by June 1916. During World War I Russian and British submarines operated from bases in Finland. The Russian submarines of Holland type (AG-11, AG-12, AG-15 and AG-16) were scuttled in the harbor of Hanko on 3 April 1918 just prior to the German landing there. AG-12 and AG-16 seemed to be in relatively good shape and the Finns decided to salvage them. The submarine was transferred to Ab Vulcan shipyard in Turku for repairs, although it proved to be hopeless, and she was soon scrapped.

== Bibliography ==
- Building Submarines for Russia in Burrard Inlet by W.Kaye Lamb published in BC Studies No.71 Autumn, 1986
- Polmar, Norman & Noot, Jurrien (1991). Submarines of the Russian and Soviet Navies, 1718–1990. Naval Institute Press. ISBN 0-87021-570-1.
- Watts, Anthony J. (1990). The Imperial Russian Navy. London: Arms and Armour. ISBN 0-85368-912-1.
