= SS Sulina =

History
- Name: Sulina
- Owner: Romanian Government
- Builder: Cantieri Riuniti dell' Adriatico
- Yard number: 135
- Completed: 1939
- Acquired: 1939
- In service: 1939
- Out of service: 29 May 1942
- Fate: Torpedoed 29 May 1942 and sunk

General characteristics
- Type: Cargo ship
- Tonnage: 3,495 GRT
- Length: 110 m (360 ft 11 in)
- Beam: 15.5 m (50 ft 10 in)
- Installed power: Diesel engine
- Propulsion: Screw propeller
- Speed: 15.5 knots (28.7 km/h; 17.8 mph)

SS Sulina was a Romanian cargo ship that was torpedoed by the Soviet submarine A-3 and sank on 29 May 1942 near Odessa while carrying general cargo.

== Construction ==
Sulina was built at the Cantieri Riuniti dell' Adriatico shipyard in Italy in 1939. Where she was launched and completed that same year. The ship was 110 metres (360 ft 11 in) long and had a beam of 15.5 metres (50 ft 10 in). She was assessed at 3,495 GRT and had a diesel engine driving a single screw propeller. The ship could reach a maximum speed of 15.5 knots (28.7 km/h; 17.8 mph).

== Sinking ==
Sulina was torpedoed near Odessa by the Soviet submarine A-3 on 29 May 1942 while carrying a cargo of 4,000 tons of oats, 510 tons of wheat, 2 artillery guns and ammunition. The ship sank but the fate of the crew is unknown.

== Wreck ==
The current location of the wreck is believed to lie at (46°31′N 30°52′E).
