= Russian submarine AG-16 =

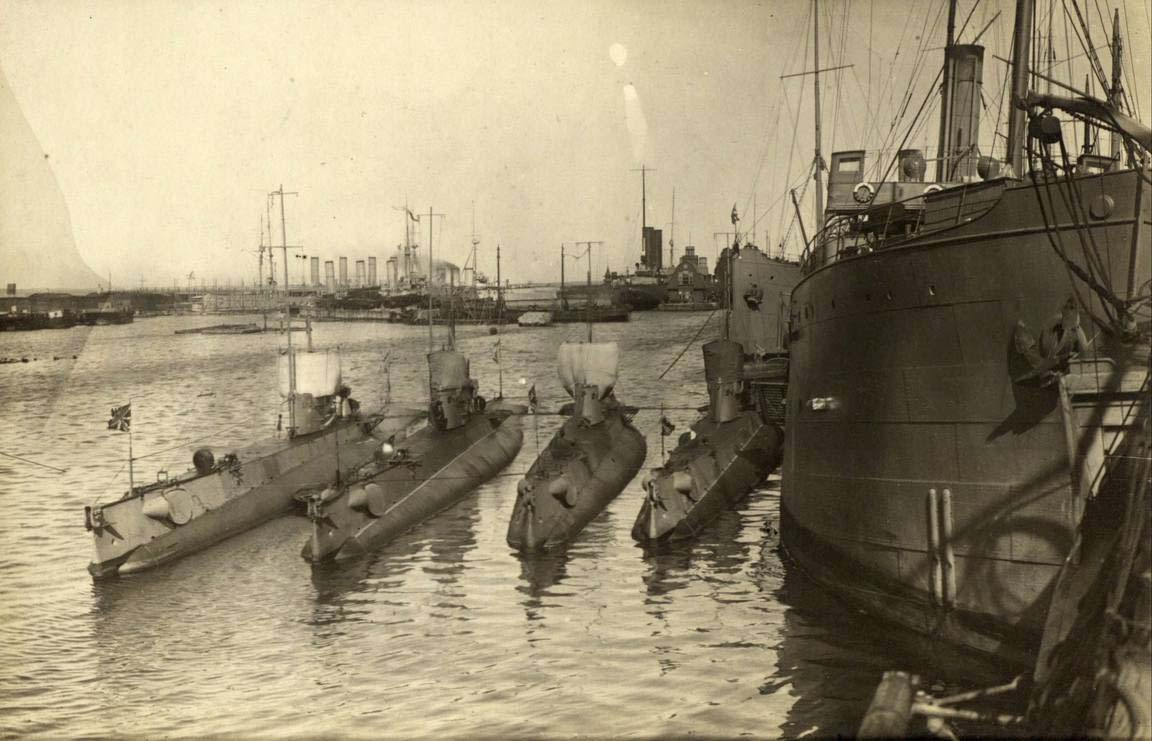
- AG-16 (leftmost) with sisterships and submarine tender "Oland" in 1917

History

Russia
- Name: AG-13
- Builder: Electric Boat Company, Noblessner, Baltic Shipyard
- Completed: 17 November 1916
- Commissioned: 24 November 1916
- Renamed: AG-16, 8 July 1917
- Fate: Scuttled 3 April 1918, Scrapped, 1929

General characteristics
- Class & type: AG-class submarine
- Displacement: 355 long tons (361 t) surfaced; 433 long tons (440 t) submerged
- Length: 150 ft 3 in (45.80 m)
- Beam: 16 ft (4.9 m)
- Draught: 12 ft 6 in (3.81 m)
- Propulsion: 2 shafts; 2 diesel engines (480 bhp (360 kW)); 2 electric motors (640 hp (480 kW))
- Speed: 13 knots (24 km/h; 15 mph) (surfaced); 10.5 knots (19.4 km/h; 12.1 mph) (submerged)
- Range: 1,750 nmi (3,240 km; 2,010 mi) at 7 knots (13 km/h; 8.1 mph) (surfaced); 25 nmi (46 km; 29 mi) at 3 knots (5.6 km/h; 3.5 mph) (submerged)
- Test depth: 164 feet (50 m)
- Complement: 30
- Armament: 4 × bow 17.9-inch (455 mm) torpedo tubes; (8 torpedoes); 1 × 47-millimeter (1.9 in) gun

The AG-16 was an AG-class submarine, designed by the American Holland Torpedo Boat Company/Electric Boat Company, built for the Imperial Russian Navy during World War I. The submarine was fabricated in Canada, shipped to Russia and reassembled for service with the Baltic Fleet. The boat was originally named AG-13, but was redesignated AG-16 after AG-15 sank and later repaired in 1917. She was scuttled by the Russians at Hanko in April 1918.

Attempts were made by the Finns to salvage the vessel: the boat was raised in 1918 and transferred to Helsinki for repair, but this proved too costly and she was scrapped in 1929.

== Description ==
AG-13 was a single-hulled submarine, with a pressure hull divided into five watertight compartments. The submarine had a length of 150 feet 3 inches (45.8 m) overall, a beam of 16 feet (4.9 m) and a draft of 12 feet 6 inches (3.8 m). She displaced 355 long tons (361 t) on the surface and 433 long tons (440 t) submerged. The AG-class submarines had a diving depth of 164 feet (50.0 m) and a crew of 30 officers and enlisted men.

The submarine had two 3-bladed propellers, each of which was driven by a 480-horsepower (360 kW) diesel engine as well as a 640-horsepower (477 kW) electric motors. This arrangement gave AG-22 a maximum speed of 13 knots (24 km/h; 15 mph) while surfaced and 10.5 knots (19.4 km/h; 12.1 mph) submerged. She had a range of 1,750 nmi (3,240 km; 2,010 mi) at 7 knots (13 km/h; 8.1 mph) while on the surface and 25 nmi (46 km; 29 mi) at 3 kn (5.6 km/h; 3.5 mph) while submerged. Her fuel capacity was 16.5 long tons (16.8 t) of fuel oil.

The AG-class submarines were equipped with four 18-inch (457 mm) torpedo tubes in the bow and carried eight torpedoes. For surface combat they had one 47-millimeter (1.9 in) deck gun.

== Construction and service ==
=== In Russian service ===
The Holland 602 design was widely exported during World War I and the Imperial Russian Navy ordered a total of 17, in three batches, of a version known as the American Holland-class (in Russian Amerikansky Golland, AG). The submarines were to be built in Canada as knock-down kits for assembly in Russia.

Components for the first batch of five submarines were assembled in Barnet, near Vancouver, British Columbia, Canada. They were prefabricated by British Pacific Engineering and Construction. and shipped to Vladivostok. There they were loaded onto the Trans-Siberian Railroad and transported to Saint Petersburg where they were assembled by the Baltic Works by June 1916. AG-13 was redesignated AG-16 in 1917. During World War I Russian and British submarines operated from bases in Finland. The Russian submarines AG-11, AG-12, AG-15 and AG-16 were scuttled in the harbor of Hanko on 3 April 1918 just prior to the German landing there.

=== In Finnish hands ===
AG-12 and AG-16 seemed to be in relatively good shape and the Finns decided to salvage them. AG-16 was transferred to Helsinki and the Finns asked both Germany and Electric Boat for estimates on the cost of repairs. The latter was so costly so only the German alternative remained. German experts evaluated AG-16, but the Finnish government never provided funds for the repairing of the submarine. The repairs would be costly and no shipyard were prepared to guarantee the results. The submarine was stored on dry land until 1929 when the Finnish government finally agreed on the new Fleet program, which also included new submarines. AG-16 was then scrapped.

== Bibliography ==
- Lamb, W. Kaye (Autumn 1986), "Building Submarines for Russia in Burrard Inlet", BC Studies, no. 71
- Polmar, Norman & Noot, Jurrien (1991). Submarines of the Russian and Soviet Navies, 1718–1990. Naval Institute Press. ISBN 0-87021-570-1.
- Watts, Anthony J. (1990). The Imperial Russian Navy. London: Arms and Armour. ISBN 0-85368-912-1.
