= Port of Pori =

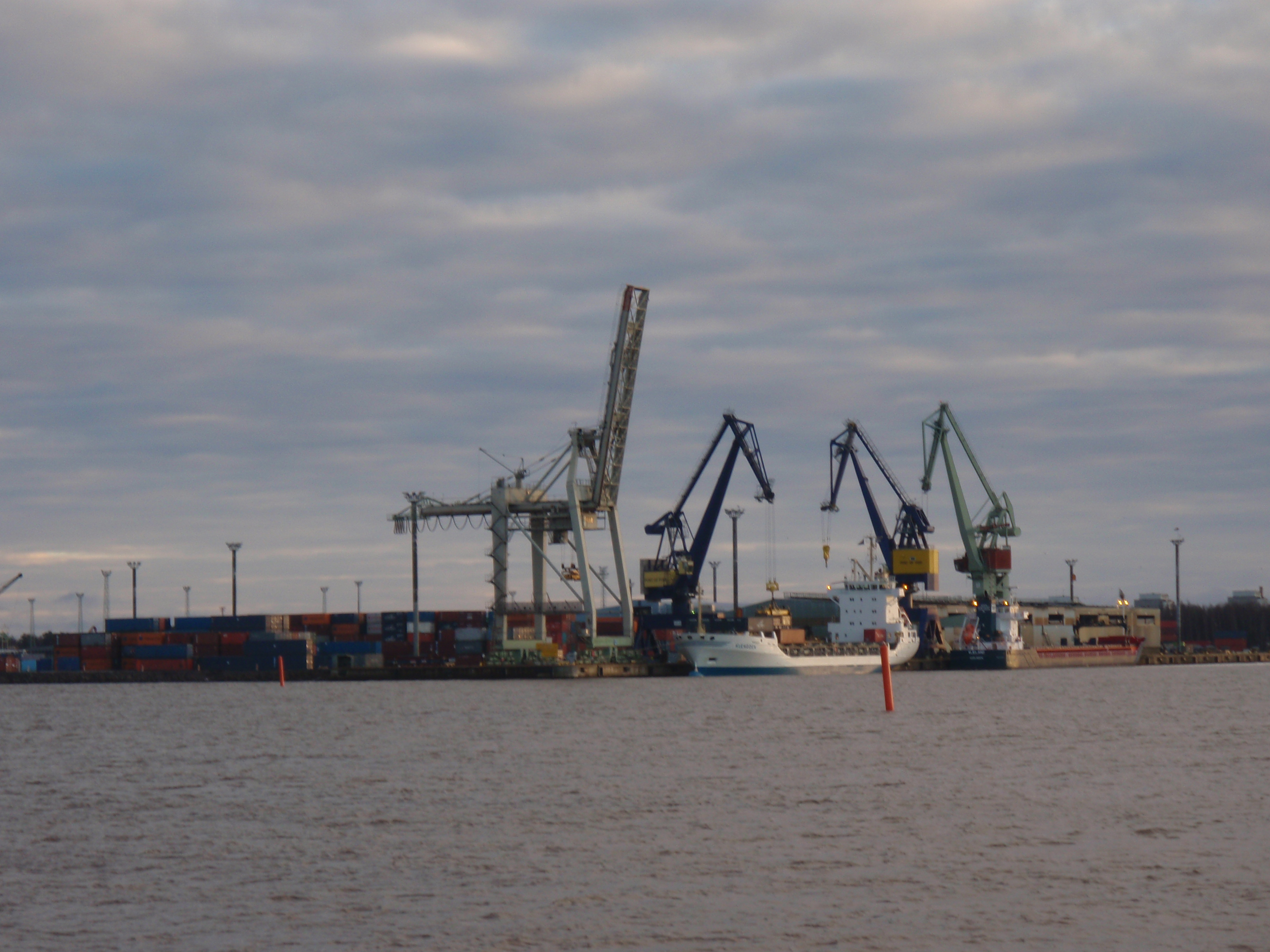
- Mäntyluoto harbour
- Click on the map for a fullscreen view
- Port of Pori (Finland)

Location
- Country: Finland
- Coordinates: 61°35′N 21°29′E
- UN/LOCODE: FIPOR

Details
- No. of berths: 23
- Draft depth: 15.3m

Statistics
- Website www.portofpori.fi

Port of Pori (Finnish: Porin satama) is a complex of three harbours. It is by the Gulf of Bothnia in Pori, Finland. The port authority of Pori was established in 1780. Today the Port of Pori is a corporation owned by the city.

Port of Pori has liner service to several ports in Northern Europe, for example Hamburg, Ghent, St. Petersburg and Teesport.

== Mäntyluoto ==
Mäntyluoto harbour has docks for container traffic and dry bulk. Crane capacity is up to 200 tonnes (200 long tons; 220 short tons). The 200-ton crane Masa is the strongest in Finnish ports. The maximum allowed draught in Mäntyluoto is 12.0 metres (39.4 ft).

== Tahkoluoto ==
The Tahkoluoto bulk harbour has 15.3-metre (50 ft) draught which allows access for capesize vessels. Oil and chemical harbour operates in a separate area.

== See also ==
- Kallo Lighthouse
- Ports of the Baltic Sea
