= Mäntyluoto =

District in Pori, Finland

Coordinates: 61.591826°N 21.491975°E

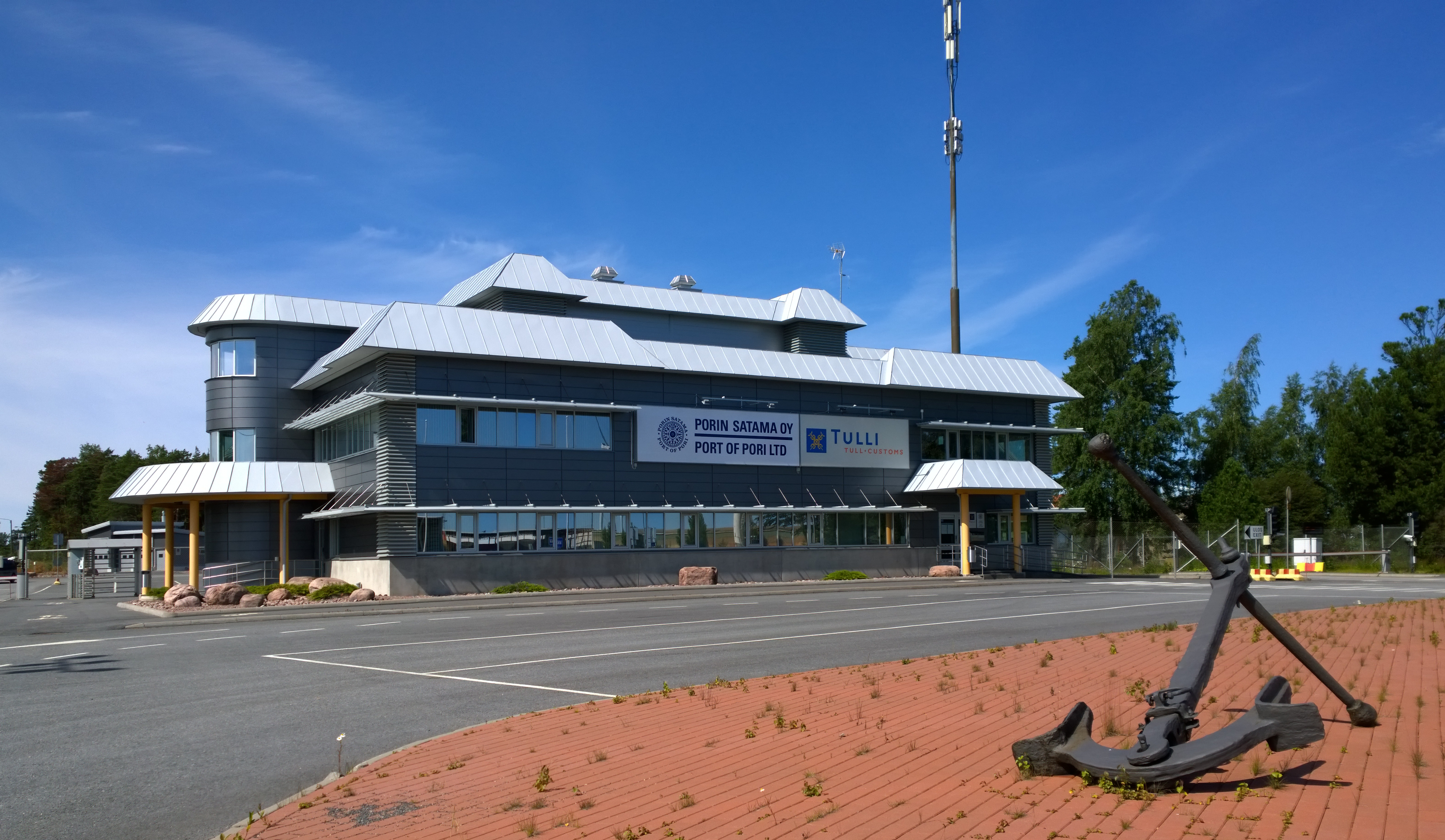
Mäntyluoto Harbour office and customs building

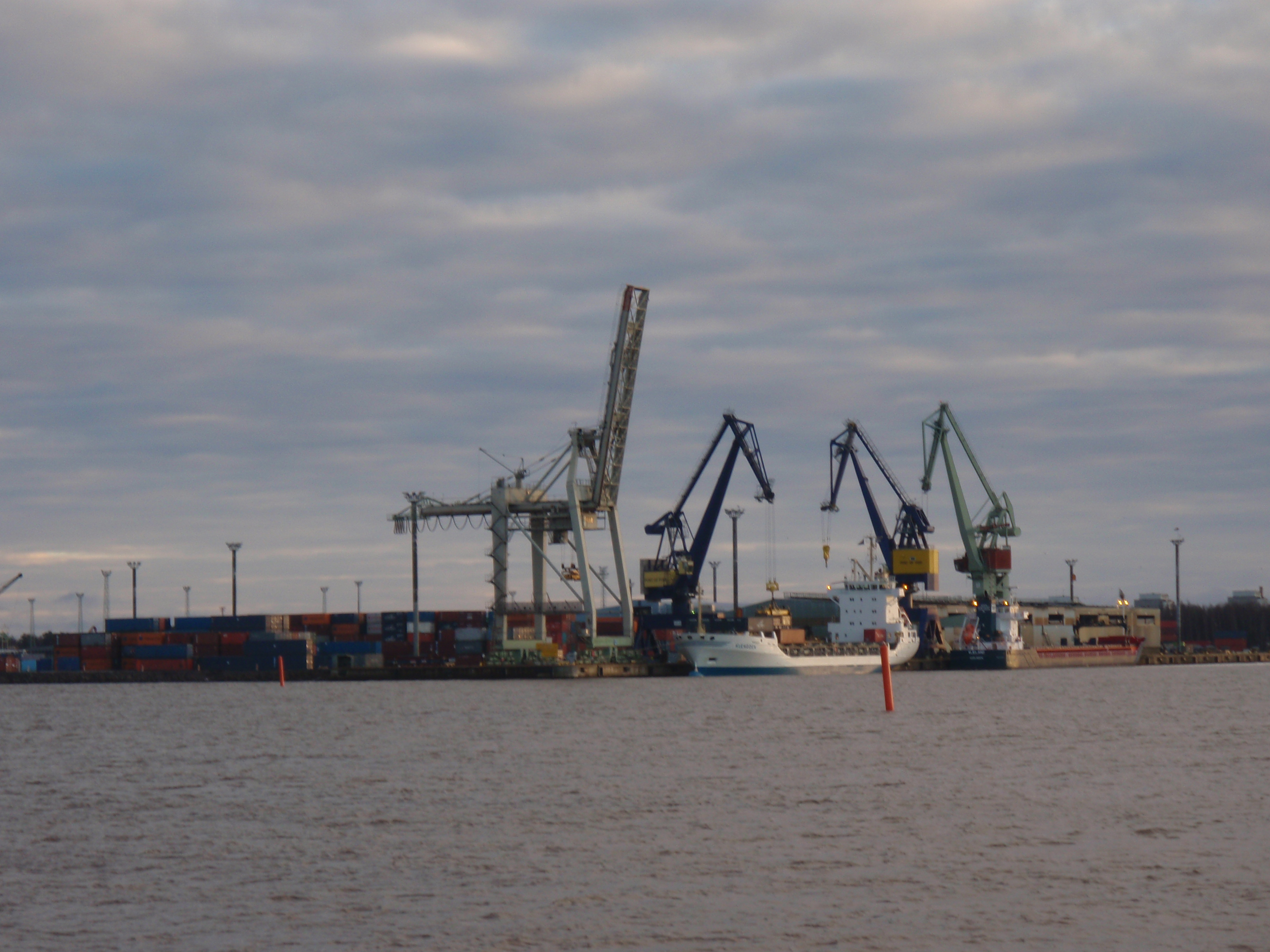
The harbour seen from Reposaari

Mäntyluoto (Swedish: Tallholmen) is a district in Pori, Finland. It is mostly industrial and harbour area, including the Mäntyluoto Harbour which is a part of the Port of Pori. Mäntyluoto is the terminus of the Tampere–Pori railway.

The Mäntyluoto Shipyard is one of the world's leading manufacturers of spar platforms.

== See also ==
- Kaanaa
- Kallo Lighthouse
