= Baltic Sea campaigns (1939–1945) =

WWII Axis and Allied campaigns

- Part of the Eastern Front of World War II
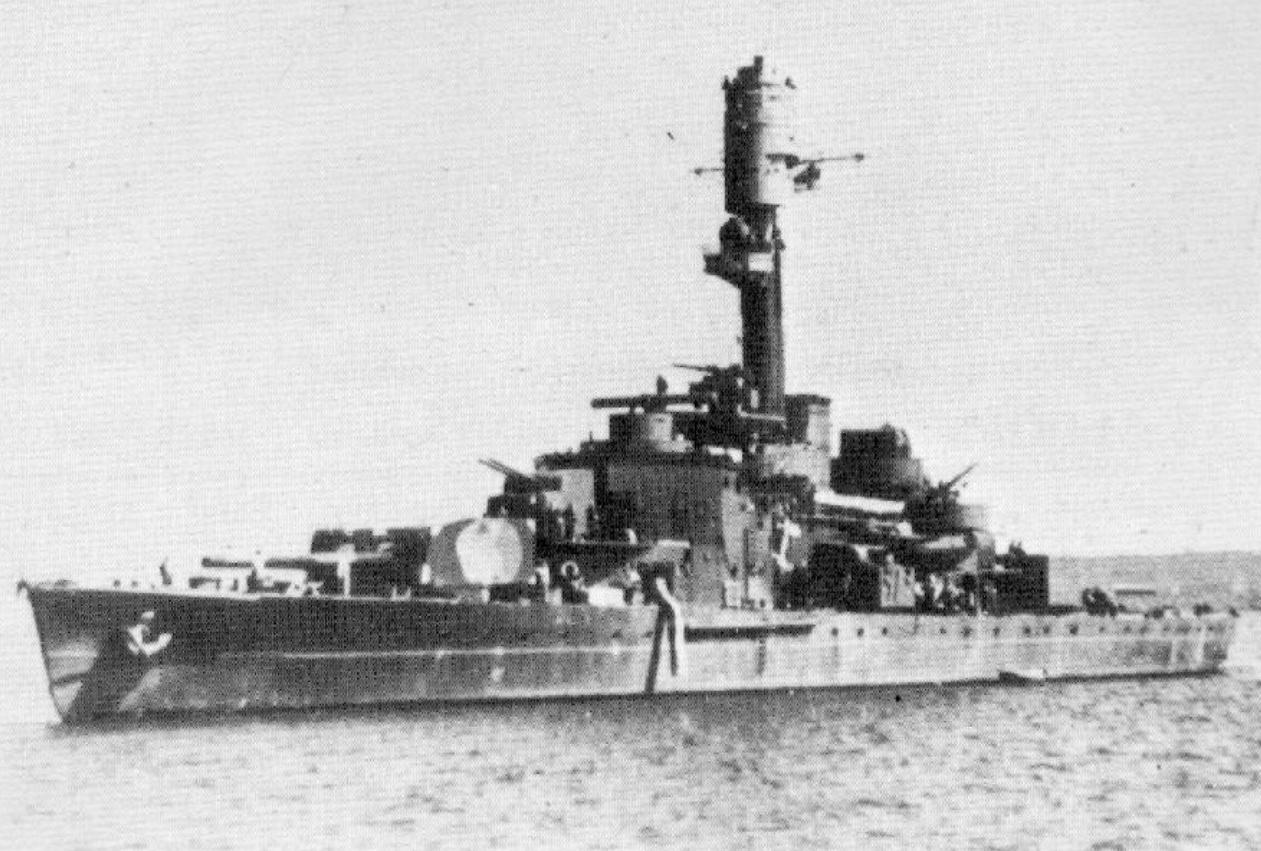
- Finnish coastal defence ship Väinämöinen in 1938.
Date	1939–1945
Location	Baltic Sea
Result	Allied victory

Belligerents
Germany; Finland (until 1944); Italy (1942–1943)	Poland (1939); Soviet Union (from 1941); Finland (from 1944)

The Baltic Sea campaigns were conducted by Axis and Allied naval forces in the Baltic Sea, the Gulf of Bothnia, the Gulf of Finland and the connected lakes Ladoga and Onega on the Eastern Front of World War II. After early fighting between Polish and German forces, the main combatants were the Kriegsmarine and the Soviet Navy, with Finland supporting the Germans until 1944 and the Soviets thereafter. The Swedish Navy and merchant fleet played important roles, and the British Royal Navy planned Operation Catherine for control of the Baltic Sea and its exit choke point into the North Sea.

While operations included surface and sub-surface combat, aerial combat, amphibious landings, and support of large-scale ground fighting, the most significant feature of Baltic Sea operations was the scale and size of mine warfare, particularly in the Gulf of Finland. The warring parties laid over 60,000 naval mines and anti-sweep obstacles, making the shallow Gulf of Finland some of the most densely-mined waters in the world.

== Participants ==
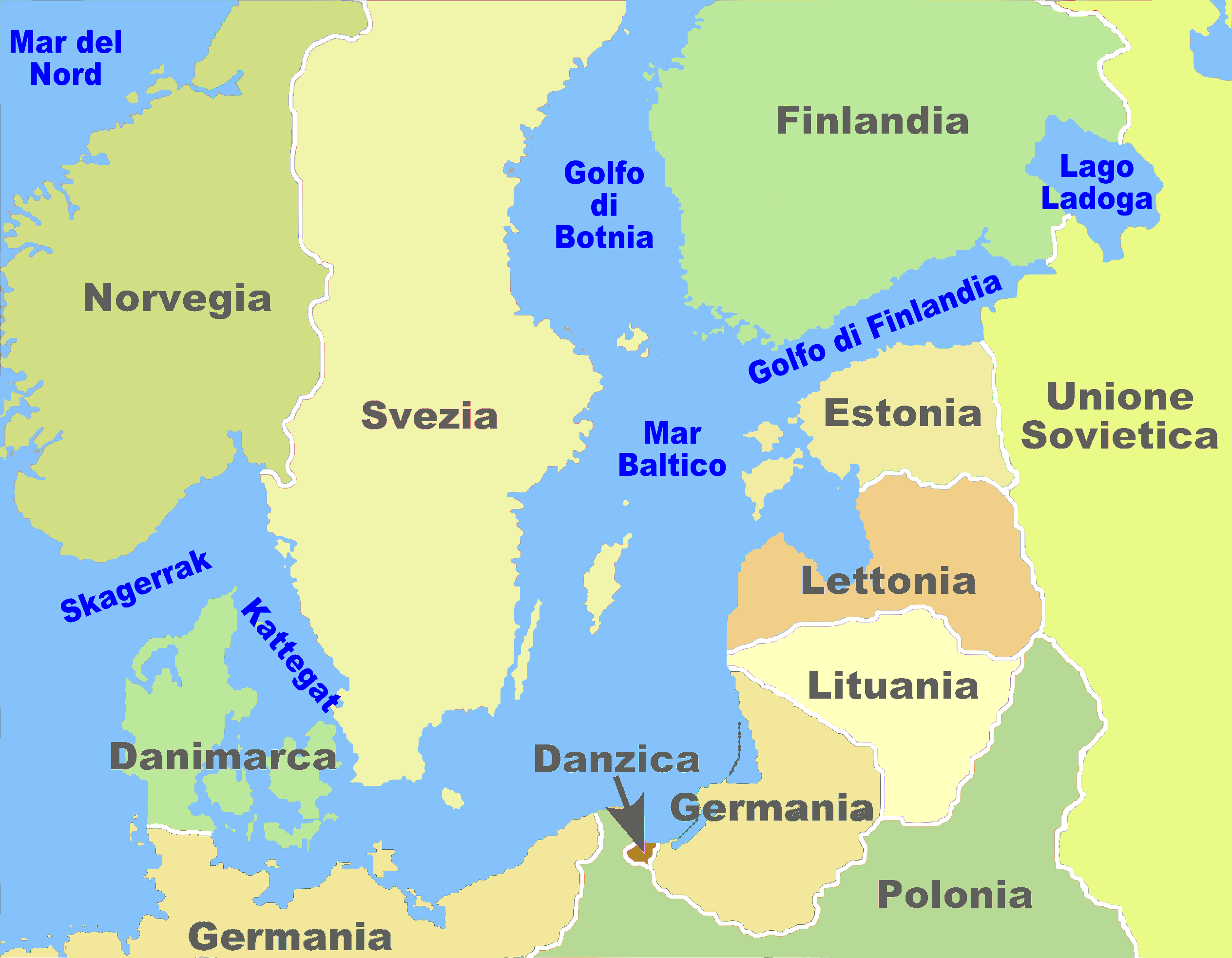
Map of the Baltic Sea in September 1939

=== Finnish Navy ===
The Finnish Navy was a small professional force. Naval strength in 1941 consisted of:

- Two coastal defence ships (Ilmarinen and Väinämöinen)
- Five submarines (Vesihiisi, Iku-Turso, Vetehinen, Vesikko and Saukko)
- Four sloops (Turunmaa, Karjala, Uusimaa and Hämeenmaa)
- Three minelayers
- 12 minesweepers
- Seven motor torpedo boats

The Finnish Navy used several other vessels (for example, Coast Guard vessels) during the wars:

- Four sloops — used mainly as escorts and minesweepers
- Six cutters — smaller vessels used as escorts and minesweepers
- 17 VMV-class patrol boats – used as small torpedo boats, gun boats, sub hunters and in other roles.

=== Kriegsmarine ===
Initially, the German Reichsmarine—the Kriegsmarine's pre-war name—suffered from the limitations imposed by post-World War I treaty obligations; by 1935, however, Germany had signed the Anglo-German Naval Agreement, which allowed it to expand considerably. The name Kriegsmarine was adopted the same year. Though a large, powerful, and professional force, it had to divide its assets between several theaters of war, severely limiting the number and size of the ships it was able to deploy in the Baltic Sea.

At the start of the Operation Barbarossa on 22 June 1941 German naval forces in the Baltic Sea consisted of

- 28 Schnellboote
- 5 submarines
- 10 minelayers (mostly converted passenger liners and ferries)
- 3 squadrons of M-class minesweepers
- 3 squadrons of requisitioned minesweepers (trawlers)
- 2 squadrons of R-boats
- 2 squadrons of patrol boats (trawlers)
- 3 Sperrbrecher
- 2 depot ships for minesweepers
- Various naval tugs, transports and other auxiliaries

In September 1941 Germany formed the provisional Baltenflotte, which consisted of the battleship Tirpitz, cruisers Admiral Scheer, Emden, Köln, Leipzig and Nürnberg, destroyers Z25, Z26, Z27 and the 2nd torpedo boat squadron. It had been tasked with destroying the Soviet Baltic Fleet should it try to escape to neutral Sweden. As this did not happen, and aerial reconnaissance showed severe damage to the remaining ships of the Soviet Baltic Fleet, the Baltenflotte was disbanded before October 1941.

=== Polish Navy ===
The relatively small Polish Navy suffered greatly from lack of funds, but still managed to field, at the outbreak of war:

- Four large destroyers
- Five submarines
- One large minelayer
- Various smaller vessels

=== Soviet Baltic Fleet ===
The Soviet Baltic Fleet was the largest of the four fleets which made up the Soviet Navy during World War II, and was commanded by Vladimir Tributs throughout the war. Though initially having bases only in the eastern corner of the Gulf of Finland, the Red Banner Baltic Fleet was the largest naval power in the Baltic Sea. As World War II progressed, it was able to make use of naval bases in Estonia, Latvia and Lithuania, first under the terms of agreements forced by the Soviet Union in autumn 1939, then by direct access to the bases following the Soviet occupation of the Baltic states in June 1940.

Gains from the peace treaty after the Winter War further helped the Baltic Fleet, as it acquired a base at Hanko, Finland, as well as the coast of the Karelian Isthmus. Liepāja and Tallinn were the main naval bases of the Baltic Fleet prior to Operation Barbarossa.

==== Soviet Naval Strength in the Baltic June 1941 ====
Ship Type	Number	Note/class
Battleship	2	Gangut class
Cruisers	2	Kirov class
Destroyer leaders	2	Leningrad class
Destroyers (Modern)	17	3 Type 7, 13 Type 7U, Opytny
Destroyers (old)	7	2 Izyaslav-class, 4 Orfey-class, Yakov Sverdlov
Submarines	65	
Escort vessels/gunboats	7	
Mine warfare vessels	39	
Motor torpedo boats	48	

=== Other navies on the Baltic Sea ===
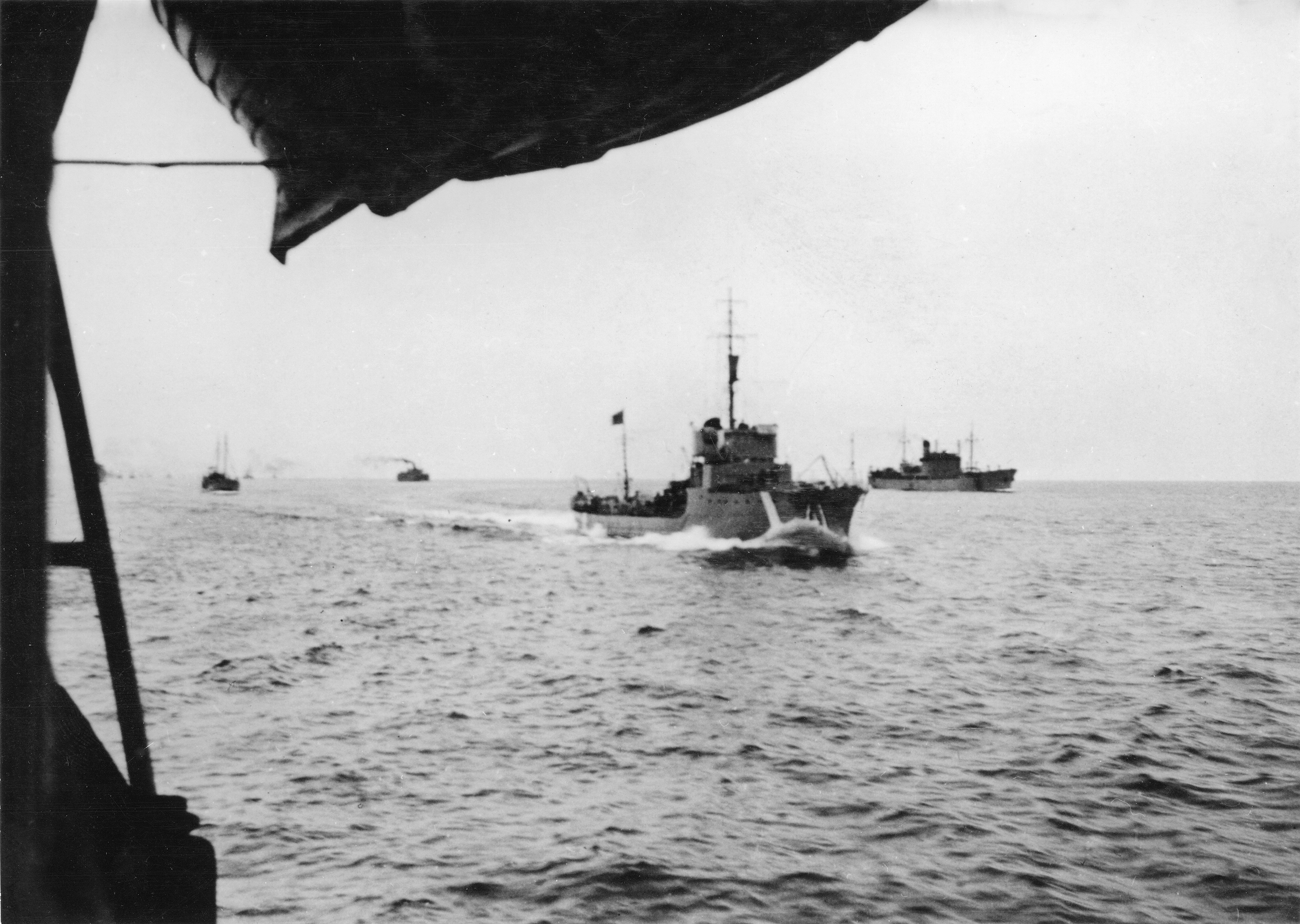
Iron ore carrier M/S Luleå being escorted by the Swedish navy the day she was sunk by a Soviet submarine

The Swedish Navy was the third largest in the Baltic Sea. Though Sweden stayed neutral during the war, its naval vessels escorted and protected convoys inside Swedish territorial waters, at times attacking hostile submarines with depth charges.

Estonia, Latvia and Lithuania all had small naval forces before World War II. During the occupation and annexation of the Baltic states by the Soviet Union in 1940 these were attached to the Soviet Baltic Fleet.

== Campaigns on the Baltic Sea ==
=== Operations before 1941 ===
==== Invasion of Poland ====
The Polish Navy participated in the Battle of Gdańsk Bay and Battle of Hel in 1939. A few of its surface ships were evacuated to continue the war from Britain (Operation Peking), but most vessels remained in Poland and were sunk by German forces. Polish submarines operated briefly in the Baltic until either internment in Sweden or escape to Britain (see Orzeł incident) in the autumn of 1939. German naval losses during the invasion amounted to a minesweeper.

=== Operations in 1941 ===
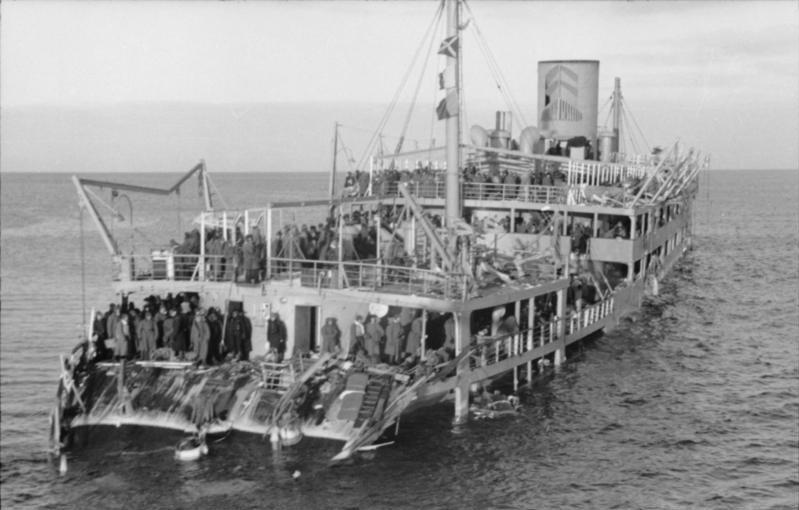
The Soviet passenger ship Iosif Stalin, used for evacuation of troops from Hanko in November 1941, damaged by mine on 3 December 1941 and captured by the Germans

The Winter War and the occupation of the Baltic states had left the Red Banner Baltic fleet in a strong position. It was the largest navy on the Baltic Sea (two battleships, two heavy cruisers, 19 destroyers, 68 submarines, and a naval air arm comprising 709 aircraft) with bases all along the Baltic coast as well as in Hanko. In particular, the long and vulnerable southern coast of Finland was now exposed to the Soviet navy for its full length.

The Finnish Navy had two branches, the old but well-maintained coastal fortifications built by the Russians before World War I (Peter the Great's Naval Fortress), and the actual navy, consisting of two coastal defence ships, five submarines and a number of smaller craft. The Kriegsmarine could provide only a small part of its naval force, as it was tied up in the battle of the Atlantic. Germany's main concern in the Baltic sea was to protect the routes through the Archipelago Sea which supplied its war industry with vital iron ore imported from Sweden.

The Soviet Navy was taken by surprise by the initial German assault on the USSR on 22 June 1941, and suffered heavy losses during the evacuation from the Baltic States and Finland. The Kriegsmarine had started laying mines several hours before the actual start of the invasion, with immediate effect, the Soviet Baltic Fleet losing a destroyer to mines on the second day of the war. The rapid German advance forced the Soviet Navy to abandon its bases along the Baltic coast and evacuate towards Tallinn and Kronstadt.

To guard against a breakout by the Red Fleet, the Germans deployed a large battlegroup—including the new battleship Tirpitz, cruisers, and destroyers—to the Baltic in August–September 1941, and laid a series of minefields across the Gulf of Finland. As the Soviet fleet made no attempt to flee to the Atlantic or neutral Sweden, Germany eventually withdrew its capital ships. Later, the Finnish coastal defence ship Ilmarinen was sunk by mines during Operation Northwind, a failed feint operation. Finnish submarines and surface forces repeatedly attacked Soviet convoys to and from Hanko but with limited success, due to both strong Soviet resistance and equipment failures. A report from Hanko told of a transport arriving with two unexploded Finnish torpedoes jutting from its hull.

As naval bases at Riga and Liepāja were lost to German advances, the Soviet Navy withdrew to Tallinn, which was surrounded by the end of August, forcing the Soviets to conduct an evacuation by sea. To counter this, the German and Finnish navies dropped 2,400 mines, adding to the 600 already in the sea lanes outside Tallinn. German artillery was set up at Juminda peninsula, Finnish and German torpedo boats were put on alert. The Soviet evacuation consisted of 160 ships, which carried 28,000 people (including the Communist leadership and their families, army and navy personnel, and 10,000 Estonians) and 66,000 short tons (60,000 t) of materiel.

The evacuation began on the night of 27 August, at the same time as the first German troops entered the city. During embarkation the ships were under constant attack by German bombers and artillery, which continued as the armada reached the heavily mined Juminda peninsula. At midnight on 28 August the armada ran into the minefields while being attacked by Finnish and German torpedo boats. Casualties were heavy, with 65 of the 160 ships lost, and several more damaged. Of the 28,000 evacuees, 12,400 perished. With relatively small means, the Kriegsmarine and Finnish Navy had dealt a severe blow to the Red Banner Baltic Fleet, which withdrew to the relative safety of the naval mine barriers and coastal fortifications of Kronstadt.

At the start of the war Finnish ground troops isolated the base at Hanko, with its 30,000-man garrison. The front there remained static, with only small scale naval and amphibious actions in the surrounding archipelago. By the end of the summer the Finnish 17th Division, which had made up the bulk of the besieging force, left Hanko for Eastern Karelia. By December 1941 the base was evacuated, having lost its importance due to both the continuing blockade and the rapid German advance toward Leningrad. The evacuation was performed in several convoys, which managed to transport roughly 23,000 troops to Leningrad. The fleet suffered casualties from Finnish minefields and coastal artillery, losing three destroyers and two large transports (Andrei Zhdanov and Iosif Stalin) as well as several smaller vessels. Finnish troops took the abandoned and heavily mined Hanko after the Soviets had left.

Soviet forces withdrew from Beryozovye Islands too and Finnish forces then moved in and constructed forts in the area. While transporting supplies to these forts, the vessel Porkkala ran into a mine on 28 November 1941 and sank. She was later repaired and refitted and recommissioned.

Though naval mines, aerial supremacy, and the rapid German advance on land had largely neutralized its heavy elements, the Soviet Baltic Fleet in the immediate vicinity of Leningrad had not been destroyed. Shore bombardment by the fleet was important in saving Leningrad from the Initial German assault in September. The battleship Marat was sunk by German Junkers Ju 87 Stuka dive bombers in Kronstadt on 23 September, but was partially salvaged for use as a static battery. Many Baltic Fleet sailors fought on land during the Siege of Leningrad. Also, though some of the islands in the bay of Finland had been lost during 1941, the islands of Seiskari and Lavansaari were held, which would prove to be important bases as the war progressed.

=== Operations in 1942 ===
In 1942, the Baltic Fleet was confined to the innermost part of the Gulf of Finland by German minefields. The Soviets maintained the Oranienbaum Bridgehead and sent several submarines into the open Baltic via Lavansaari island, which now proved an invaluable base for both submarines and light surface forces. Submarines attacked German-Finnish as well as neutral shipping with limited success, sinking 18 ships but losing 12 submarines.

Although the losses inflicted by the Soviet submarines were fairly light, their presence in the Baltic Sea disrupted transportation and forced vessels to use safer coastal waterways instead of faster open sea routes. Continued Soviet submarine operations forced the Germans and Finns to step up their anti-submarine efforts in the Gulf of Finland, and largely due to these efforts, Soviet submariners met increasing hardships and losses, while seeing ever-fewer victories against Axis shipping.

The Soviets had evacuated most of the islands in the Gulf of Finland in late 1941. They recaptured the Suursaari from a small Finnish detachment in January 1942; two months later, a larger Finnish force with strong air cover marched over the ice and drove off the Soviet garrison. Soviet attempts to regain the island resulted in battles which continued over the ice until April 1942. Finnish and German forces also captured lightly defended Tytärsaari. In July 1942, the Soviets attempted to wrest the small island of Someri from the Finnish. In spite of initial success, the Soviet landing force was crushed, and the supporting naval units were repulsed in what proved to be one of the largest surface actions seen on the Baltic Sea during World War II. During this battle, Finnish gunboats Turunmaa and Hämeenmaa were both damaged by Soviet aircraft. .

Finnish submarines spent most of early 1942 on the docks, where they were fitted with improved listening devices and weapons systems. In October 1942, the boats were deployed to the Sea of Åland to hunt Soviet submarines which had managed to break through the anti-submarine barriers. Each of three large Finnish submarines managed to destroy one Soviet submarine, of which two were destroyed with torpedoes, and one by intentional ramming. Anti-submarine efforts on the Sea of Åland proved effective enough for the Soviet command to decrease submarine operations in the area. In November 1942, Finnish motor torpedo boats raided the harbor of Soviet-controlled Lavansaari, sinking the gunboat Krasnoye Znamya in shallow water. The Soviets were able to recover and repair the ship, and after several months it was returned to active duty.

=== Operations in 1943 ===
In the spring of 1943, the Axis completed an extensive mine and anti submarine net barrage across the Gulf of Finland, effectively preventing Soviet submarines from raiding German shipping or disrupting U-boat training. The Soviets at least managed to sink one of the two main Finnish minelayers: Riilahti was torpedoed and sunk on 23 August by motor torpedo boat TK-94. Six Soviet submarines were lost trying to penetrate the barrage. Furthermore, on 2 May 1943, while guarding the mine barriers northeast of Hogland, Finnish gunboat Turunmaa was seriously damaged in a Soviet air raid. (The ship was refloated and was fully repaired by 23 October 1943.) Also, on 16 September, a low-flying Ilyushin Il-4 torpedo plane surprised Finnish escort vessels Uisko and Tursas north of Keri lighthouse. Uisko was sunk with the loss of 18 men, only 2 men survived.

=== Operations in 1944 ===
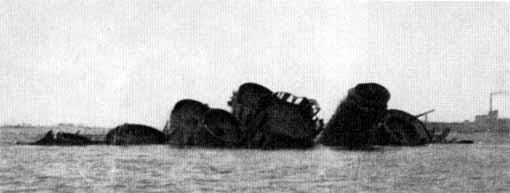
The wreck of Niobe in Kotka

The Soviets began to defeat the Axis on land in 1944, lifting the Siege of Leningrad and relieving the Oranienbaum Bridgehead in January. In February 1944, Finland lost VMV 12 and VMV 8 which were sunk during Soviet air raids on Helsinki. Also, a Soviet amphibious assault on the south coast of the Gulf of Finland was repelled. Resisting at the Estonian border, the Axis maintained a minefield blockade until September, when Finland signed peace with the Soviet Union, and Army Group North retreated from Estonia. The Kriegsmarine lost several minesweepers and the anti-aircraft cruiser Niobe in the process. Three German Elbing-class torpedo boats—T22, T30 and T32—were also lost after running into a minefield in August 1944.

During the Soviet offensive against Finland in the summer of 1944, the Red Army made landings in the Koivisto islands. Finnish and German naval units clashed with Soviet light naval units and were subjected to repeated air attacks, during which the Finnish Navy lost Tarmo and VMV 17, Germany lost T 31 (during the Battle of Nerva Island) and AF 32, and both had several other vessels damaged. Finnish forces were evacuated from the islands unchallenged, which opened the way for Soviet amphibious operations on Viipuri Bay. Finnish and German light naval forces made repeated raids into the bay, under constant air, artillery and motor torpedo boat attacks. While no ships were lost during the raids, nearly all participating vessels were heavily damaged. Of the Finnish ships, the worst damage was suffered by the auxiliary gunboat Viena during a Soviet air attack. The naval forces never reached their target area, but their raids helped the defense of the islands in Viipuri Bay by drawing artillery fire, as well as attacks by Soviet aircraft. Also, on 23 June, German destroyer Z39 was damaged by Soviet bombers while moored off of Paldiski.

After the Allied invasion of Normandy (D-Day), Großadmiral Karl Dönitz transferred the bulk of the German surface fleet to the Baltic in order to support the seaward flank of the German Army. The heavy cruiser Prinz Eugen bombarded Red Army positions near Riga, and several U-boats infiltrated the Gulf of Finland, losing six boats to the Soviets. Of particular importance was the loss of U-250, sunk by the Soviet submarine chaser MO-103, because the Soviets managed to recover the wreck (despite Axis efforts) with all her secrets (including its new acoustic torpedoes). Also, on 16 July 1944, German anti-aircraft cruiser Niobe was sunk by Soviet bombers, seventy of the crew of the Niobe died and a Soviet A-20 was downed. Furthermore, on 25 July 1944 minesweeper Vilppula and small Finnish coastal minesweeper Merkurius were both torpedoed by a lone Boston (Douglas A-20 Havoc) type bomber. Though these two ships were later re-floated they were not deemed to be worth of repairing.

Following Finland's armistice with the Soviets, the Germans tried to seize strategic positions in Finland. In the Baltic, this included the failed operation Tanne Ost and the cancelled operation Tanne West.

In late August and September the Germans abandoned Estonia, successfully evacuating 91,000 soldiers and 85,000 civilian refugees by ship. This, combined with the use of Finnish bases and coastal seaways, enabled the previously impenetrable anti-submarine barrier to be circumvented by the Soviets. During the Moonzund Landing Operation, the Red Army and the Baltic Fleet took Estonia's islands in September, and completed their operations in Estonia by the end of October. The Kriegsmarine opposed this offensive by bombarding the Red Army, the destroyers Z35 and Z36 were sunk in December and the destroyer Z28 was damaged by a Soviet aircraft in October (Had to be repaired until February 1945).

=== Operations in 1945 ===
In 1945, as the Red Army advanced further into German territory, the Kriegsmarine was involved in evacuating refugees and bombarding the Soviets. The Soviet surface fleet remained in the Leningrad area due to minefields and the poor condition of the ships, but Soviet submarines were very active, sinking the liners Wilhelm Gustloff, General von Steuben and Goya, which were evacuating refugees from East Prussia, with heavy loss of life. Soviets accomplished a single significant raid, using motor torpedo boats to torpedo and heavily damage in Danzig Bay the modern German destroyer Z34, but no other similar actions were repeated. Other Soviet activities in the Danzig Bay included a small field of mines laid by submarine L-21, sinking one submarine (U-367) and two torpedo boats (T3 and T5) while destroyer Z43 suffered damage. Also, Orion sank close to Swinemunde with heavy loss of life after taking 2 bombs dropped by a Soviet aircraft.

== Operations on Lakes Ladoga and Onega ==
Before World War II, Soviet and Finnish naval strength on Lake Ladoga (Finnish: Laatokka) was limited by the 1920 Treaty of Tartu, which restricted the maximum displacement of ships to 100 long tons (100 t) and the maximum weapon caliber to 47 mm (1.85 in).

=== Operations in 1939–1940 ===
Lake Ladoga became part of the battleground during the Winter War, though it remained frozen for most of that conflict, limiting the use of naval forces on the lake. As the winter progressed, troop and supply movements across the ice became increasingly important, the Finns having surrounded a large Soviet formation on the northern shore of the lake, near Kitilä, in a motti. Unlike many other encircled Soviet formations, the forces in Kitilä were able to survive due to supply routes running across the ice. Finnish forces tried repeatedly to halt these operations by both fortifying islands next to the ice road and cutting cracks into the ice.

=== Operations in 1941–1944 ===
When Operation Barbarossa and the Continuation War began, Lake Ladoga became a battleground once more. The Soviets' first task was the evacuation of Red Army troops trapped against the northern shore of the lake by advancing Finnish forces. These withdrawals were for the most part successful, with Soviet forces sustaining only minor losses. After the German push toward Leningrad had besieged the city, the supply routes across the lake became of paramount importance to the Soviet defenders. As ice formation prevented ships from transporting supplies, ice roads were made on the lake-ice, forming the Road of Life.

When Finnish forces reached Lake Onega (Finnish: Ääninen) in 1941 they captured several Soviet ships, and raised others which had been sunk in shallow water by the retreating Soviets. Some of these were armed by the Finns. A captured Soviet naval vessel renamed VTV-1 (patrol gunboat no. 1) was brought to Onega to support naval operations; however, most of the ships available to the Finns were obsolete and unable to challenge even the small Soviet force that operated on the lake.

Having determined that chances of successfully challenging Soviet naval forces during open-water season were low, the Finns emphasized long-range patrols to attack Soviet boats while they were still docked. Their first successful operation took place on the frozen lake in spring of 1942, when a Finnish patrol crossed the ice and set fire to some Soviet barges. Small skirmishes continued throughout 1942. In a notable engagement on 4 September, three Finnish ships escorting a tug engaged an armed Soviet steamer, and later two patrol boats, with inconclusive results. During the winter of 1942–1943 Onega did not freeze properly, which prevented actions over the ice. Another inconclusive encounter between Soviet and Finnish naval forces took place on 13 September 1943. The Winter of 1943–1944 was also fairly warm, enabling ships to sail throughout the season on Onega.

The Italian MAS boats MAS 527 and MAS 528 on Lake Ladoga at Sortanlahti during the Siege of Leningrad, October 1942

By the summer of 1942, the Finns had moved only the obsolete motor torpedo boat Sisu to Ladoga. The rest of their naval force there consisted of small civilian boats and transport vessels captured from the Soviets. Germany and Italy also sent some naval forces to Ladoga, forming—together with Sisu—Naval Detachment K under Finnish command. Using mainly Italian MAS boats from the XII Squadriglia MAS and German minelaying KM-boats from the Kriegsmarine's 31st Minesweeper Flotilla (German: 31. Minensuchflottille), the naval detachment tried several times to interdict the Leningrad supply convoys on Ladoga. Another German formation on Lake Ladoga—the Luftwaffe's EFO—used Siebel ferries and infantry boats (I-boats) to carry out several raids against Soviet forces; however, its operations effectively ceased following the defeat at the Battle of Sukho Island on October 22, 1942. All these German and Italian forces were transferred away as the lake began to freeze over, and they did not return the following year, as the Soviets had managed to open a land route to Leningrad in January 1943. The Finns bought several of the German Siebel ferries and I-boats and used them on Ladoga; they also bought the Italian MAS boats and used them in the Baltic.

Since the transport network on shore was of relatively limited utility, the main task of Finnish naval forces had been to protect the transportation of materials over the lake. In 1943 there was little naval activity on the lake. In 1944, however, the Soviet offensive across the River Svir (aimed at capturing Sortavala at the lake's northern end) included a landing at Tuloksa on the eastern shore. One Soviet naval infantry brigade was landed, and later reinforced by a second. Soviet air and naval superiority prevent Finnish naval forces from challenging them; however, as the Soviet offensive continued, the Finnish flotilla—reinforced by three obsolete motor torpedo boats and three additional barges acquired from the Germans—supported the land forces with their artillery and countered Soviet raids at the northern end of the lake. When a ceasefire was declared, most of the Finnish naval assets were evacuated via land routes over the agreed-upon border. The Soviets demanded the former German barges and infantry boats, and received them in August 1945 at Helsinki.

When the Soviets began their 1944 offensive in the Karelian Isthmus, the Finns, anticipating another offensive closer to Onega, had already begun evacuating the region. From 16 through 27 June, Finnish naval forces successfully protected the evacuation convoys, after which the ships were disarmed and scuttled. Only VTV-1 was spared, being transported by rail to the Baltic. Soviet naval forces started their attacks on Onega on 26 June, and by the time they landed troops at Petrozavodsk on 28 June, the Finns had already left the area.

=== Finnish Naval forces on Lake Onega ===
Name	Type	Role	Armament
Karhumäki; Kontupohja	Paddlewheel steamers	Gunboat	1–3 × 75 mm gun(s); 0–2 × 40 mm gun(s); 2–3 × 20 mm guns
VTV-1	Patrol boat (captured 1941)	Gunboat	1 × 76.2 mm gun; 1 × 20 mm gun; 6 × machine guns
Väinö; Urho; Ilmari; Limo	Tugs	Patrol boat	1–2 × 40 or 45 mm gun(s); 1 × 20 mm gun
14 boats	Motor boat	Patrol boat; Minesweeper	2 × 20 mm anti-tank rifle; 2 × machine gun

== See also ==
- Black Sea campaigns (1941–1944)
- Battle of Hanko (1941)

== Bibliography ==
- Ruge, Friedrich (1979). The Soviets as Naval Opponents. Annapolis: Naval Press. ISBN 978-0-87021-676-3
- Jackson, Robert (2007). Battle of the Baltic. ISBN 978-1-84415-422-7
