= Operation Kilpapurjehdus =

1941 Finnish remilitarization of the Åland islands

- Part of World War II
- Operational scope: Åland islands
- Objective: Remilitarize the Åland islands
- Date: 20 June 1941
- Outcome: The 14th Infantry Regiment, seven artillery companies from 7th Coastal Brigade and other smaller units land on the Åland islands. The Åland islands were again demilitarized after the end of the Continuation War.

Operation Kilpapurjehdus ("Regatta") was the covername for the militarization of the Åland islands during World War II. The operation took place on June 22, 1941, and in this way, Finland strived to prevent Soviet landings in the area.

The Åland islands had been demilitarized since 1921, through a League of Nations decree, which outlawed any military personnel or material on the islands. After the end of the Winter War, the Soviet Union controlled both the Hanko Peninsula and Estonia and the Finnish leadership feared that the Soviets were planning a landing in the demilitarized area. The Finnish militarization plan was ready by April and they started to move troops towards the coast between Turku and Pori according to the plan.

The Navy HQ gave its own order for execution of the operation June 20, during daytime on 21 June 1941 Finnish warships had already relocated to the area of Nagu and Korpo, and were followed by transports with troops in the evening. Although during the night they stopped on the border of the territorial waters to await confirmation of the German attack on the USSR, and after it was received at 4:30 the movement continued. The operation was launched at the same time as the German Operation Barbarossa. The landing involved over 20 cargo ships, the two coastal defence ships Ilmarinen and Väinämöinen, as well as the three gunboats Uusimaa, Hämeenmaa and Karjala. More than 5,000 men and artillery were landed the same evening in Mariehamn. The troops were 14th Infantry Regiment, seven artillery companies from 7th Coastal Brigade (Turku Coastal Regiment) and other smaller units, over 100 horses and 69 guns with ammunition. Soviet aircraft tried to attack the ships during transport, but without result.

On the same day, the Finnish military illegally invaded the Consulate of the Soviet Union in Mariehamn and arrested the entire consular staff numbering 31 people, and soon they were deported to the city of Turku.

The Soviet Union had also created a similar plan after the Winter War, but they never tried to land on the islands during World War II.

The Soviet invasion threat was no longer acute after the Soviets had evacuated their Hanko base and the Germans had advanced in the Baltic states. On the day of signing the Anglo-Soviet Agreement, July 12, 1941, the 14th Infantry Regiment is sent from Åland to reinforce Operation Platinum Fox. Coastal batteries of the 7th Coastal Brigade became combat-ready during July. Since 6.7.1941 all troops in Åland Islands were under the command of the defending coastal brigade. On 8.11.1941 the westernmost units of suspended 5.RPr. were attached to brigade. On 1.3.1942 brigade was re-arranged and re-named as Turku Archipelago [Sea] Coastal Brigade and its staff was moved to Turku.

The Åland islands were again demilitarized after the end of the Continuation War and remain so today.

== See also ==
- Continuation War
