= Włodzimierz Steyer =

Polish rear admiral (1892-1957)

Wlodzimierz Brunon Steyer
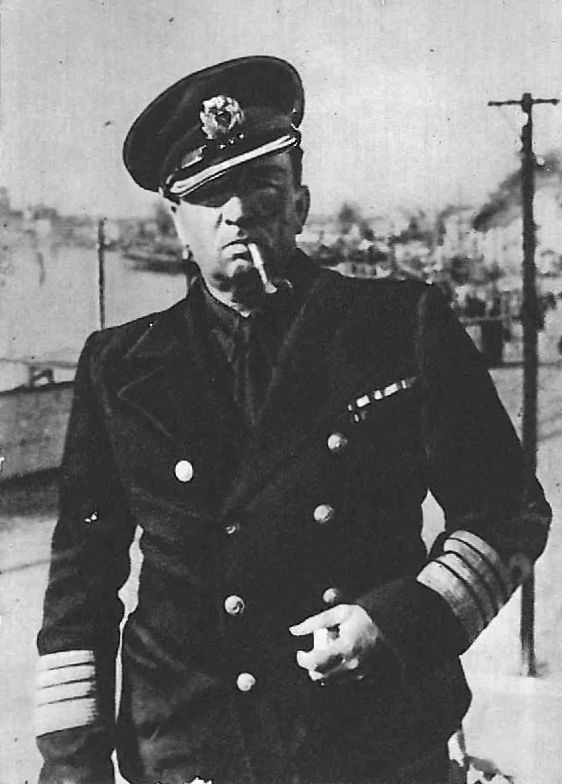
- Born: July 15, 1892; Montreal, Quebec, Canada
- Died: September 15, 1957 (aged 65); Gdańsk, Poland
- Burial place: Defenders of the Coast Cemetery, Gdynia, Poland
- Military career
- Allegiance: Russian Empire; Poland
- Branch: Imperial Russian Navy; Polish Navy
- Service years: 1913 – 1918 (Russia); 1919 – 1950 (Poland)
- Rank: Kontradmirał
- Commands: ORP General Haller; ORP Komendant Pilsudski; ORP Mazur; ORP Baltyk
- Conflicts: World War I; Polish-Bolshevik War; World War II; Battle of Hel

Rear Admiral Włodzimierz Steyer (July 15, 1892 – September 15, 1957) was a Polish naval officer before and during the Second World War. During the Invasion of Poland in 1939 he commanded the Polish land forces defending the Hel Peninsula in what became known as the Battle of Hel, the longest-lasting battle of the campaign. After the war he briefly served as the commanding officer of the entire Polish Navy. Steyer was also an author of novels under the pen-name "Brunon Dzimicz".

== Biography ==
=== Early life ===
Włodzimierz Brunon Steyer was born in Montreal, Canada, to Włodzimierz Steyer Sr. and Tekla (née Witołd-Aleksandrowicz). Early in his childhood Steyer with his parents moved to Saint Petersburg in Russia.

=== Russian navy ===
In 1913 he graduated from the Naval Cadet Corps, and then a course on naval gunnery. Conscripted into the Imperial Russian Navy, he was commissioned as a gunnery officer aboard the Askold. On that ship he took part in a spectacular cruise from the Pacific to the Mediterranean in 1915, and then the naval operations in the Dardanelles Campaign. In 1917 he was wounded by shrapnel and withdrawn to Finland, where he served on several smaller ships of the Murmansk Flotilla.

=== Polish military ===
In 1919 Steyer arrived in Poland and volunteered for the Polish Army. As the Polish forces lacked skilled naval officers, Steyer was quickly promoted and became the deputy commanding officer of the Military Port of Modlin. As the Polish Navy lacked ships, and there were no naval operations during the Polish-Bolshevik War, in 1920 Steyer formed a battalion out of naval NCOs and volunteered for the front-line service in the land forces. However, his unit arrived to the front shortly before the cease-fire and did not take part in the hostilities.

Between 1921 and 1922 he was the headmaster of the Temporary Course for Naval Officers, the predecessor of the Academy of the Polish Navy. Afterwards he became the commanding officer of the school ship Generał Haller. In 1924 he became the commanding officer of the gunship Komendant Piłsudski, and then in 1926 of the torpedo boat Mazur. The same year he graduated from the École des officiers canonniers in Toulon.

Soon afterwards he retired from active service and joined the Polish Merchant Marine, where he served as an officer aboard SS Wilno. However, in 1927 he returned to the Polish Navy and became the commander of the Bałtyk, the largest ship ever to serve in the Polish Navy. He was then briefly a director of an Arms and Artillery Department at the Naval HQ, and the commanding officer of Mazur. In late 1920s he was also the commander of a Polish military mission to France, where he supervised the purchase of two relatively modern destroyers, Wicher and Burza. Upon their arrival in Poland, both were pressed into service in the newly formed Destroyer Division, of which Steyer was the commanding officer between 1933 and 1935.

Afterwards Steyer became the commander of the Gdynia naval base. At the same time he also headed the delivery commission of a series of the Jaskółka-class minelayers (based on the successful Jaskółka), the Grom-class destroyers and heavy minelayer Gryf. From 1937 he commanded the Hel Fortified Area.

At that post Steyer served during the German Invasion of 1939, defending the area between September 1 and October 2, 1939. The units under his command were among the last ones to capitulate in 1939. Taken prisoner of war by Nazi Germany, Steyer spent the rest of the war in various prisoner-of-war camps, including Stalag X-C Nienburg, Oflag XVIII-C Spittal, Oflag II-C Woldenberg and Oflag X-C Lübeck, from where he was liberated by British troops in 1945.

Steyer was one of the few officers to return to communist-controlled Poland, and join the recreated Polish Navy. Initially a commander of the demolished port of Gdynia, in 1946 he headed a mission to Moscow, where he signed an agreement with the Soviet government, which leased 23 ships to Poland. Then he commanded the Szczecin Military Area and in 1947 became the commander of the entire Polish Navy. In 1950 he did not allow the security services to arrest the commander of Błyskawica, and as a result he was dismissed from his post and retired.

=== Following dismissal ===
Unable to make his living on his officer's pension, Steyer started working as an ordinary clerk in the PKO bank in Gdynia and Ostrołęka. During Khrushchev's Thaw, in 1957, he was given a flat in Wrzeszcz, Gdańsk and he finally retired. However, a month later he was hospitalized, and died on September 15, 1957. He was buried with military honours at the Defenders of the Coast Cemetery in Redłowo, Gdynia.

== Publications ==
By the 1930s Steyer had already begun his career as a writer. He translated a number of articles on naval issues and had them published in a variety of newspapers. He also published a series of maritime novels under the pen-name of Brunon Dzimicz. Among his works are Samotny krążownik (Lone Cruiser, 1934), Skaza marynarska (Seaman's Taint, 1937), Eskadra niescalona (Unintegrated Escadrille, 1939), Przygody mata Moreli (The Adventures of Corporal Morela, 1947) and Samotny półwysep (Lone Peninsula, 1957).

== Promotions ==
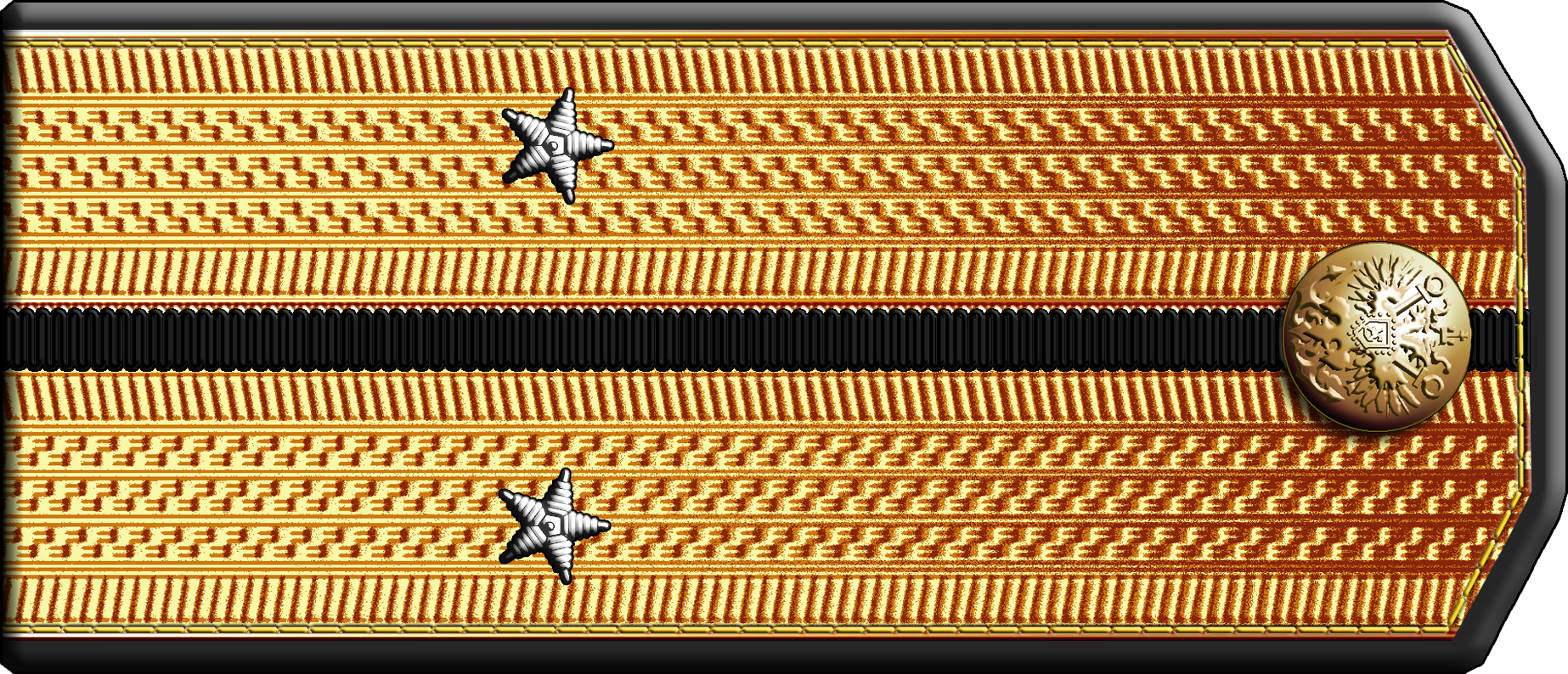
- Michman (Midshipman) - 1913
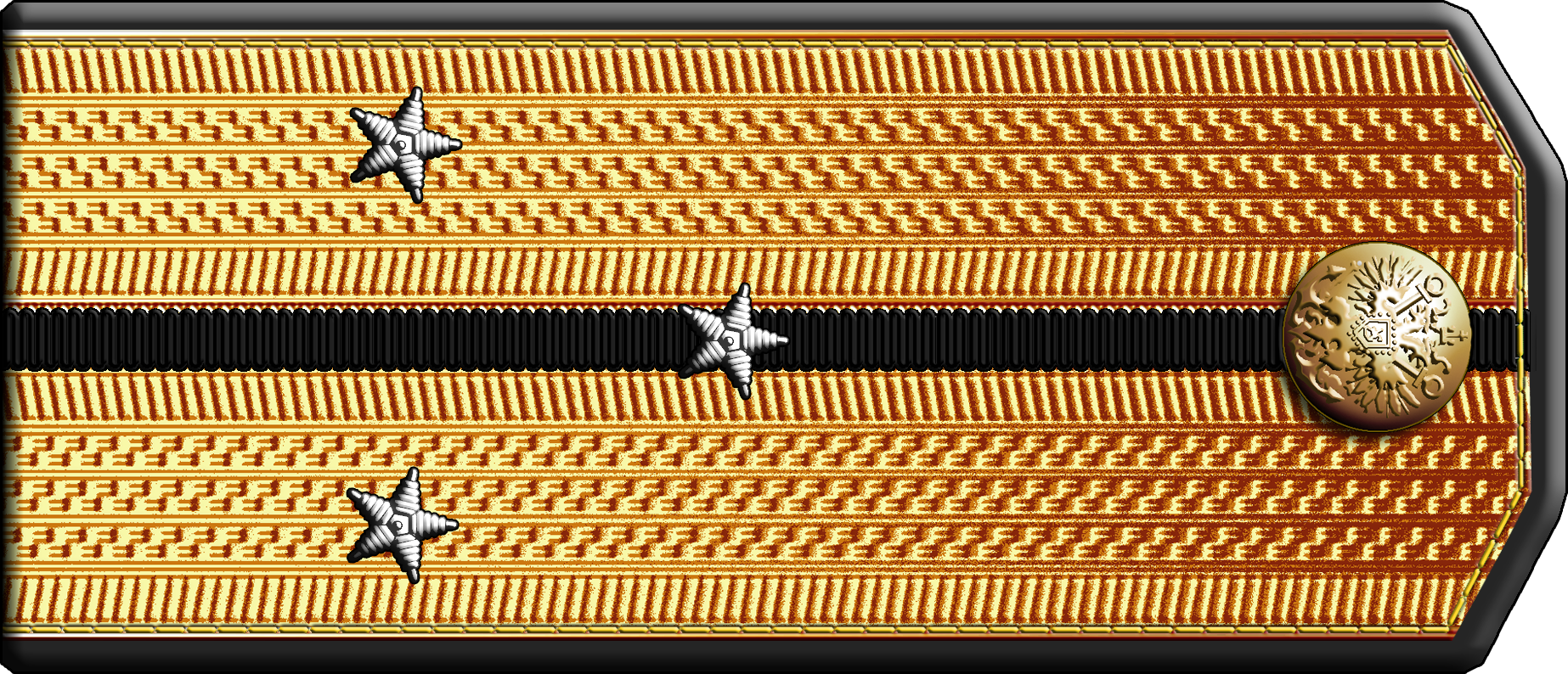
- Leitenant (Lieutenant (junior grade))
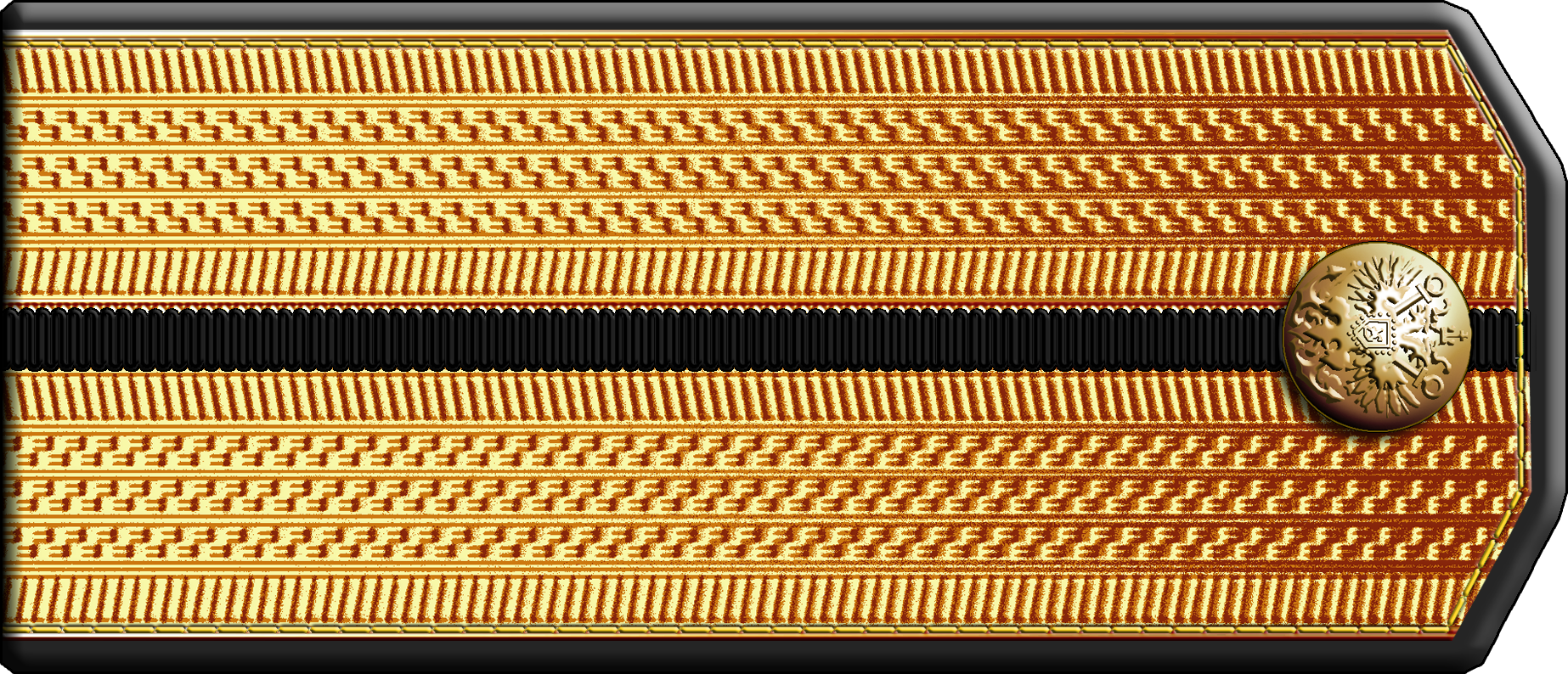
- Starshii leitenant (Lieutenant) - 1917
- Kapitan (Lieutenant) - 1919
- Komandor podporucznik (Lieutenant commander) - 1921
- Komandor porucznik (Commander) - 1932
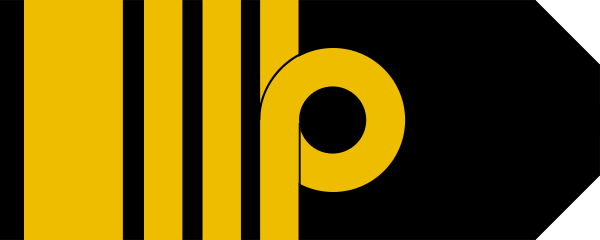
- Komandor (Captain) - 1938
- Kontradmirał (Commodore) - 1946

== Awards ==
- Silver Cross of Virtuti Militari
- Commander's Cross of Order of Polonia Restituta
- Officer's Cross of Order of Polonia Restituta
- Knight's Cross of Order of Polonia Restituta
- Golden Cross of Merit (10 November 1928)
- Commemorative Medal for the War of 1918–1921
- Medal of the Tenth Anniversary of Regained Independence
- Officer of Order of the Crown of Italy (Italy, 1925)
- Officer of Legion of Honour (France, 1931)
- Croix de guerre 1914–1918 with Bronze palm (France, 1926)
- Croix de guerre 1914–1918 with Silver star (France, 1915)
- Royal Victorian Medal (United Kingdom)
- General Service Medal (United Kingdom, 1919)
