= Finnish gunboat Turunmaa =

1916 Finnish gunboat

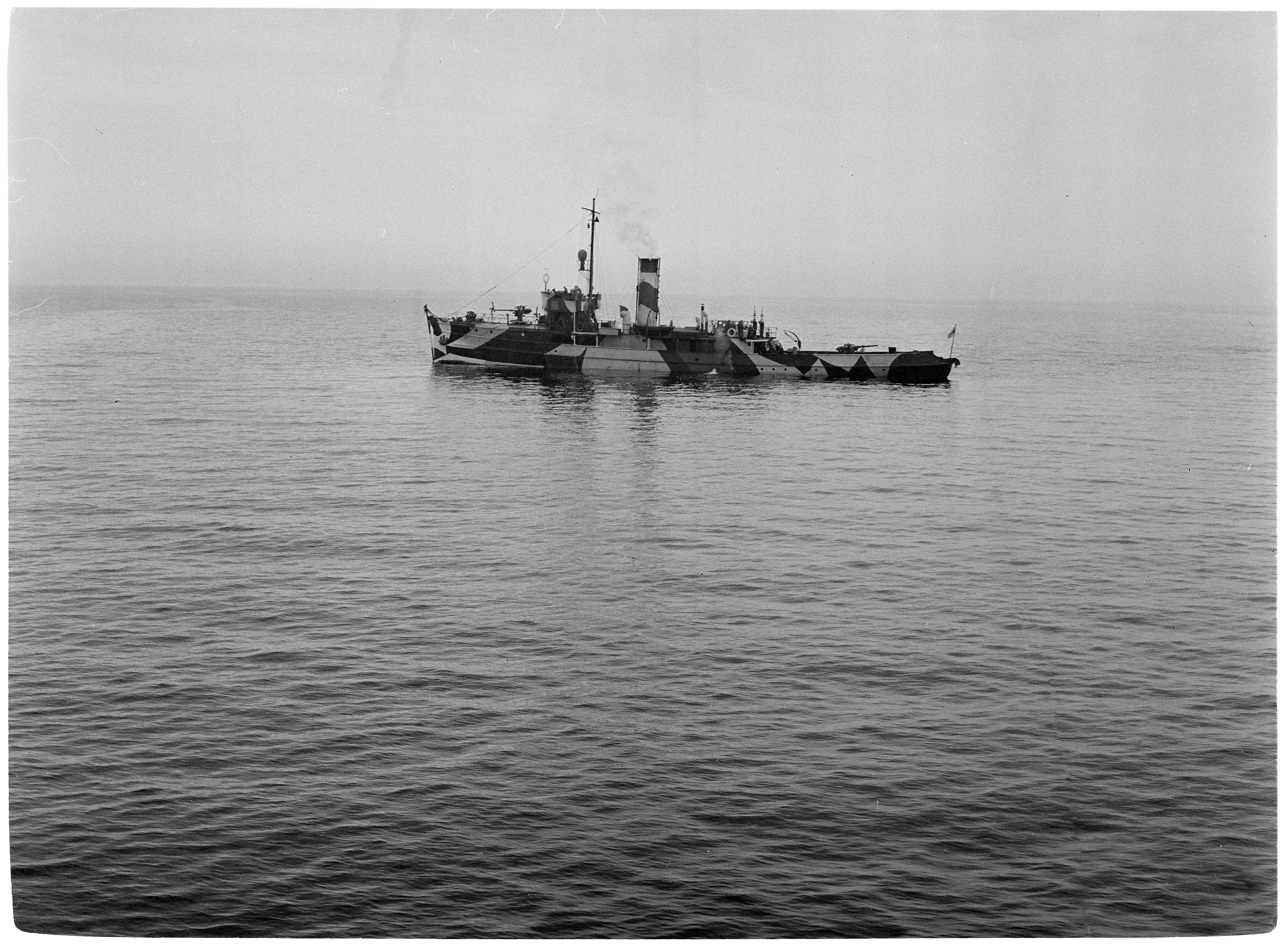
- Finnish gunboat Turunmaa

History
- Name: Turunmaa
- Commissioned: 1916 (Finnish Navy)
- Fate: Scrapped in 1953

General characteristics
- Class & type: Filin-class guard ship
- Displacement: 342 tons
- Length: 50 m (160 ft)
- Beam: 6.9 m (23 ft)
- Draft: 2.9 m (9.5 ft)
- Propulsion: two boilers, 860 kW
- Speed: 15 knots (28 km/h)
- Range: 700 nautical miles (1,300 km) at 15 knots
- Complement: 1930: 48; 1942: 63
- Armament: In 1920s: 2 × 75 mm; 12 mines; In 1939: 2 × 75 mm/50; 2 × 20 mm Madsen anti-aircraft guns; 2 × machine gun; 2 × depth charge mortar (SPH/37); 30 mines; In 1944: 2 × 75 mm/50; 3 × 20 mm Madsen anti-aircraft guns; 1 × 12.7 mm machine gun; 2 × depth charge mortar (SPH/43); 30 mines

Turunmaa was a Finnish gunboat built in 1918. She served in the Finnish Navy during World War II. The ship was named after Turuma, a type of frigate designed for use in shallow waters of the archipelago and served in the Swedish Archipelago fleet in the late 18th century. The frigates had in turn been named after the region of Finland.

During construction while in Russian lists (1916–1917) the ship had been named both Orlan and Tshirok. Turunmaa was built in Helsinki for the Imperial Russian Navy but was taken over by Finnish troops in the Finnish Civil War. The ship was used as a training ship for Finnish sea cadets during peacetime and was nicknamed as Surunmaa (land of sorrow).

== Interwar period ==
In the second half of 1919, Turunmaa, amongst other Finnish naval vessels, was tasked with security and patrol duties in the Koivisto region where the British naval detachment was located. On 4 September 1939, Turunmaa as part of the Coastal Fleet was moved to the Sea of Åland. However, for the rest of the autumn, Turunmaa patrolled the waters from Kotka to Koivisto together with Karjala.

== Winter War ==
On 1 December 1939 Turunmaa was covering the minelaying effort by auxiliary minelayer Suomi south-east of Isosaari. Turunmaa joined the Coastal Fleet near Åland in mid-December 1939. She participated in anti-submarine patrols which continued until the sea froze on 30 January.

== Continuation War ==
Turunmaa was tasked with escort duties at the start of the Continuation War. She was detached from that duty following the Soviet attack to Bengtskär and ordered to rejoin the rest of the Finnish gunboats. On 29 August Turunmaa together with Karjala, Hämeenmaa and Uusimaa escorted by Riilahti and Ruotsinsalmi sailed through the main Soviet minebarrier south of Hanko to the eastern Gulf of Finland.

After island of Sommers had been thought to be unmanned following the shelling of the island by VTV-1 on 9 October 1941 Finns prepared to occupy it. Turunmaa was escorting the landing force in its failed attempt to land on 11 October as the landing force turned back before reaching the shore when Soviets opened fire. On 29 October Turunmaa together with Karjala shelled the island.

On 1942 Turunmaa like other Finnish gunboats was tasked with guarding of the minebarriers northeast of Hogland and performing anti-submarine patrols in the same region. On 8 August Turunmaa was sortied to fend off the Soviet attack on Someri but arrived several hours after Hämeenmaa and Uusimaa. Turunmaa shelled both the nearby Soviet vessels as well as positions of the Soviet landing force on the island. After the naval action had already ended Turunmaa was slightly damaged by a near-miss by a bomb and suffered some crew losses (2 dead, 8 wounded) as overheated barrels of both of the 20mm Madsen guns aboard exploded.

On 2 May 1943 while guarding the mine barriers northeast of Hogland, Turunmaa was seriously damaged in an air raid and the sinking ship had to be beached to shallow water at Haapasaaret (group of islands south from Kotka). Crew casualties were 1 dead and 9 wounded. The ship was immediately refloated and was fully repaired by 23 October 1943.

When Soviet summer offensive of 1944 started Turunmaa was first part of the flotilla evacuating the Koivisto region. And later took part in the fighting at Bay of Viborg on 4 July 1944 as part of the Battle Group Arho consisting of Finnish and German light naval units. While defending against repeated air attacks and attacks by motor torpedo boats two bombs exploded under the boilerroom of Turunmaa. Turunmaa started leaking and the aft gun was jammed and the ship was temporarily unable to participate to the action. This and other damages to the ships of the Battle Group Arho led to its withdrawal from action.
