= Filin =

Filin may refer to:

- Filin (music), a Cuban song fashion of the mid 20th century
- Filin class guard ship, a class of ships
- Filin (surname)
