= Battle of Someri =

- Part of Continuation War
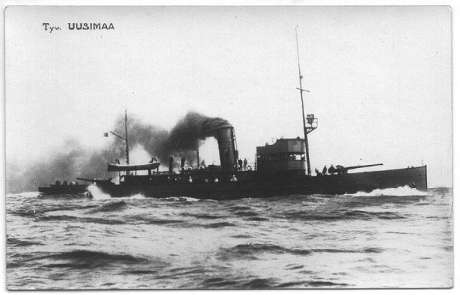
- Finnish gunboat Uusimaa
| Date | 8–10 July 1942 (2 days) |
| Location | Sommers in Gulf of Finland 60°12′25″N 27°38′35″E |
| Result | Finnish victory |

Belligerents
| Finland; Germany | Soviet Union |

Commanders and leaders
| (Finland) Veikko Rauhaniemi | (Soviet Union) Gordey Levchenko |

Strength
| 277 men, 11 boats | 313 men, 30 boats |

Casualties and losses
| 23 killed 68 wounded 2 gunboats damaged 2 minesweepers damaged | 7 patrol boats sunk (Note: Patrol boats refer both MO-boat type patrol boats and TKA-boat type motor torpedo boats.); 5 aircraft shot down 128 killed 149 captured 200 drowned 1 gunboat damaged 1 minesweeper damaged 11 patrol boats damaged |

The Battle of Someri took place in the Gulf of Finland during World War II on 8–9 July 1942, between the Soviet Union and Finland. Starting as a modest operation to clear a Finnish observation post from a small island, it became one of the largest surface ship engagements in the Baltic theater.

== Background ==
During the Russo-Finnish Winter War (1939–40), Soviet forces captured several Finnish islands in the eastern Gulf of Finland. In March 1940 these were ceded to the Soviet Union in accordance with the Moscow Peace Treaty. The Soviets occupied some of them with small garrisons. When the Continuation War began in June 1941 the islands were generally ignored; in autumn 1941, however, the Finnish Navy attempted to occupy the small, rocky island of Someri (now Sommers, Russia), mistakenly thinking it had been abandoned by the Soviets. Coming under fire from the defenders, the small Finnish landing force hastily withdrew. Over the next few weeks the Finns shelled and bombed the island several times in hopes of forcing the Soviet garrison to depart. Finally in December 1941, as Soviet forces evacuated Hanko and several other islands in the Gulf of Finland, the garrison on Someri was withdrawn to Moshchny Island. Finnish coastal forces occupied the island soon after. It proved to be a good position for observing Soviet movements in the area.

== Order of battle ==
=== Finnish ===
The 100-man Finnish garrison on the island was equipped with two 75 mm field guns, a few 45 mm anti-tank guns and 20 mm automatic cannons, and several machine guns. During the battle the garrison was reinforced with an additional 100 men. The Finnish Navy deployed 3 gunboats (Turunmaa, Hämeenmaa, and Uusimaa), 2 minelayers (Riilahti, and Ruotsinsalmi), 6 VMV-class patrol boats and 4 motor torpedo boats to the area. In addition, several small minesweepers were used to carry ammunition for the gunboats and reinforcements for the garrison. The Finnish Air Force supported the naval forces and sortied several flights of fighters (Brewster F2A Buffalo and Fokker D.XXI) and bombers (Bristol Blenheim and Dornier Do 17) to the area.

=== German ===
Germany sent two M-class minesweepers (M-18 and M-37) and an older minesweeper/tender, the Nettelbeck, to support Finnish forces. An auxiliary gunboat converted from a civilian ship – SAT Ost (Schwere Artillerie Trager – Heavy Artillery Carrier) – was also moved to the area to counter Soviet naval artillery, which was believed to be superior to that of the Finnish and German ships.

=== Soviet ===
The original Soviet landing force consisted of 256 lightly armed men (later reinforced by an additional 57 men from Moshchny Island) supported by a force of ~30 patrol (MO) and motor torpedo (TKA) boats. When the initial landing failed to surprise or overpower the Finnish defenders, more naval forces were deployed to the area. These consisted of two large minesweepers (T-205, T-207), the Uragan-class guard ship Burya (Буря), the auxiliary gunboat Kama (Кама), and additional patrol and motor torpedo boats. The Soviet Air Force repeatedly attacked Finnish ships and positions on the island with Il-4 (DB-3F) & Pe-2 bombers and Il-2 ground attack aircraft protected by I-153, Yak-1 and LaGG-3 fighters.

== Battle ==
Shortly after midnight, on 8 July 1942, Soviet aircraft bombed Someri, causing minor damage, after which 26 Soviet patrol and motor torpedo boats approached the island. Heavy firing erupted as the Soviet landing force moved ashore. Though considerably outnumbered, the heavily armed Finns, fighting from well-prepared positions, drove off many of the boats and contained the landing force in the eastern half of the island. Alerted by the garrison, a sizable portion of the Finnish Navy, as well as several flights from the Finnish Air Force, came to Someri's defense. They were able to clear the immediate vicinity of the island, but, as they drove off Soviet motor torpedo boats, repelled attacking Soviet aircraft, and bombarded Soviet troops ashore, the Finnish gunboats' ammunition stores dwindled rapidly, and they were forced to depart for resupply.

Finnish forces supported by a newly arrived German minesweeper managed to bring reinforcements to the island before noon, but once again, repeated Soviet MTB and air attacks depleted the ammunition stores on the gunboats. Soviet artillery ships started their approach and forced the Finnish ships to depart for resupply, which provided an opening for the Soviet boats to approach and in turn reinforce their landing force. Returning Finnish gunboats drove the Soviet boats away from the island before nightfall. On shore, the Soviet landing force was pushed into a small corner on the east end of the island, but managed to hold its positions there. During the night Soviet ships shelled from a distance, while a few Soviet boats managed to reach the island under cover of darkness.

On the morning of 9 July most of the naval activity came to an end as Soviet boats withdrew, though the larger Soviet ships continued shelling the area. Finnish forces, reinforced by the German SAT Ost, armed with a single 152mm gun—heavier than any guns aboard the Soviet ships—attempted to drive them away, and the Soviet ships withdrew under cover of smokescreens. This proved to be the final surface action of the battle. During the morning the last Soviet pockets of resistance had been cleared from the island. There were several more Soviet aerial attacks, but no further landing attempts.

== Results ==
Finnish and German forces reported sinking over 16 Soviet patrol and motor torpedo boats, and credited the Finnish Air Force with sinking a Soviet auxiliary gunboat; Soviet reports, on the other hand, claimed that several large vessels (Finnish gunboats or large German minesweepers) had been sunk.

The relatively weak performance of the Finnish gunboats showed how badly outdated their main armaments had become, and prompted the Finnish Navy to upgrade them; however, due their old age, weak hulls, and lack of resources, only Hämeenmaa and Uusimaa were modified before the end of the war.

In September 1944, under the terms of the armistice ending the Continuation War, Someri (now Sommers) reverted to Russian sovereignty.
