= Baltic campaign =

Baltic campaign may refer to:

- The Baltic Crusades, also called the Northern Crusades, medieval Christian colonization and Christianization campaigns around the southern and eastern shores of the Baltic Sea
- The Baltic campaign of 1854, a part of the Crimean War
- British campaign in the Baltic (1918–1919), part of the Allied intervention in the Russian Civil War
- Baltic Sea campaigns (1939–1945), naval operations in the Baltic Sea during World War II
- Occupation of the Baltic states, the Soviet occupation of Estonia, Latvia, and Lithuania in June 1940
- Baltic strategic defensive operation, a World War II Soviet defensive operation against German forces in the summer of 1941
- Baltic offensive, a World War II Soviet offensive against German forces in the Baltic States during the autumn of 1944
