= Turunmaa =

Turunmaa may refer to:

- Åboland or Turunmaa, a current region of Finland
- Finnish gunboat Turunmaa
- Turunmaa class gunboat

== See also ==
- Turuma, a type of frigate used by the Swedes in the late 18th and early 19th century
