= Chilean minelayer Colo Colo =

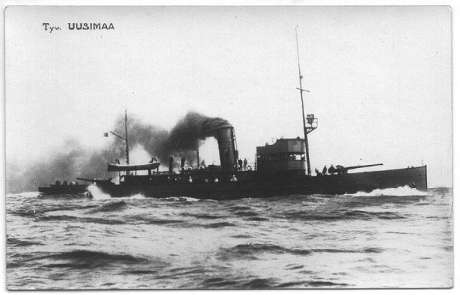
- Sister ship Uusimaa

History

Chile
- Name: Colo Colo
- Namesake: Colo Colo
- Builder: Kone ja Silta Oy and Sandvikens Skeppsdocka och Mekaniska Verkstad, Helsinki, Finland
- Laid down: 1916
- Launched: 1917
- Completed: 1918
- Commissioned: 1920
- Reinstated: In 1920 by J. Samuel White, Cowes, UK
- Fate: Sank 1944

General characteristics
- Class & type: Golub-class guard ship
- Displacement: 545 t (full)
- Length: 52.6 m (172 ft 7 in)
- Beam: 7.47 m (24 ft 6 in)
- Draught: 3.35 m (11 ft 0 in) max
- Propulsion: 1,400 hp (1,000 kW), VTE, 3 cylindrical boilers
- Speed: 14.5 knots (26.9 km/h; 16.7 mph)
- Range: coal 100, 700 sm by 14 kn
- Complement: 42
- Armament: 2 × 1 - 76/40 EOC; 50 Naval mines

The Chilean minelayer Colo Colo was a minelayer purchased from Finland in 1919. The ship entered service with the Chilean Navy in 1920. She remained a part of the Chilean Navy until 1930 when the ship was sold and renamed Toqui. The ship sank in 1944.

== Service history ==
In 1919 the Chilean Government bought 4 incomplete ships captured by Finland on slipways in 1918 after Russia's withdrawal from World War I in 1917. The ships Chibis, Kulik, Strizh and Bekas were in Helsinki under construction for the Russian Empire.

The ships were renamed Colo Colo, Elicura, Leucotón and Orompello, completed and in 1920 passed to England to receive minelaying equipment at the J. Samuel White shipyard. They arrived in Chile on 26 October 1920.

She was sold by the Cilean Navy in 1930 and renamed Toqui. During the Chilean naval mutiny of 1931 Colo Colo (mutineers) chased the submarine Rucumilla (government) and forced it to enter the Biobio River.

She sank on 25 February 1944 off Huasco.

== See also ==
- List of decommissioned ships of the Chilean Navy
