= Finnish gunboat Karjala =

Finnish gunboat built in 1918

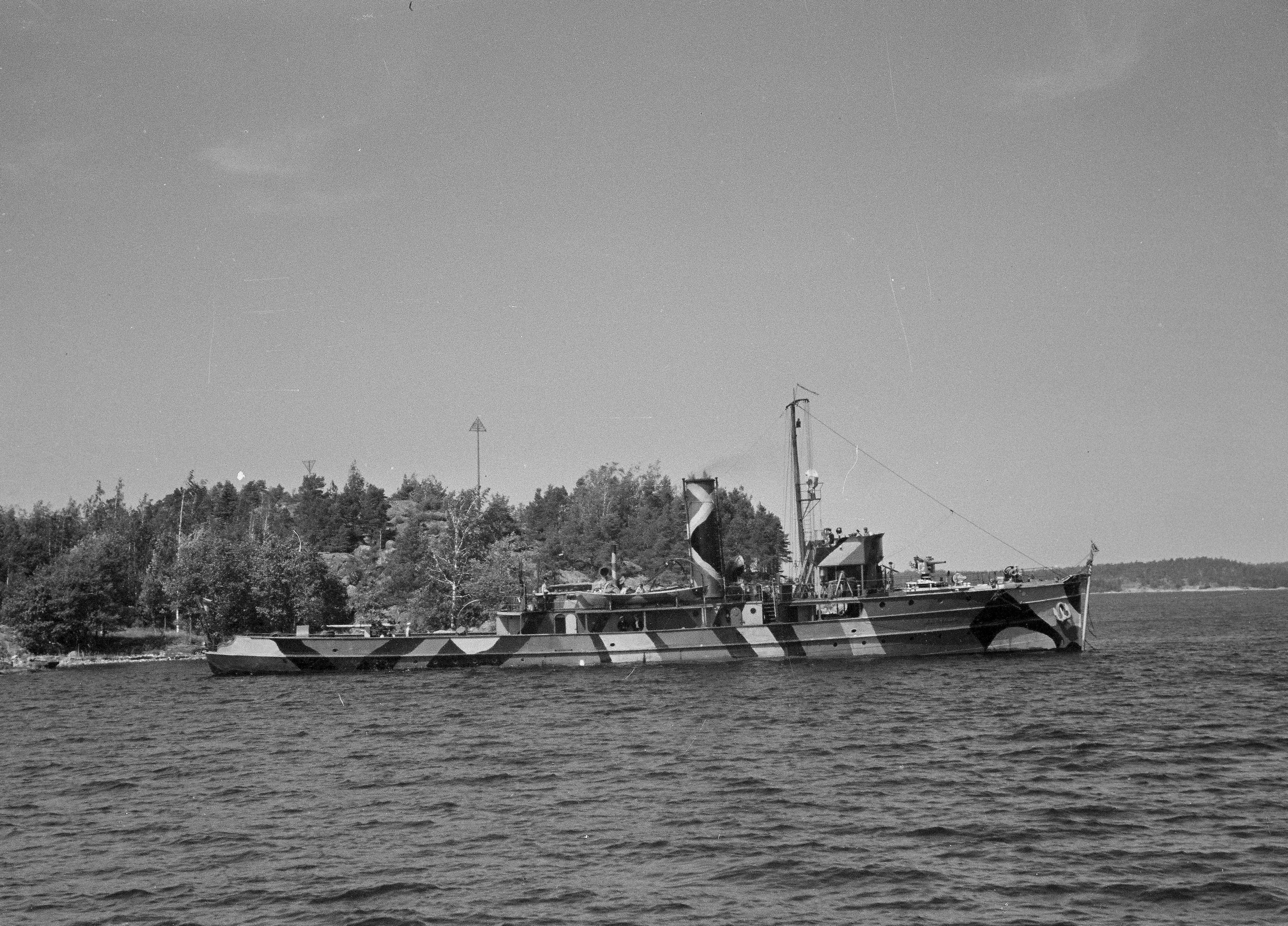
- Karjala in June 1941.

History

Finland
- Name: Karjala
- Builder: Crichton, Turku, Finland
- Commissioned: 1918 (Finnish Navy)
- Fate: Scrapped in 1953

General characteristics
- Class & type: Filin-class guard ship
- Displacement: 342 tons
- Length: 50 m (160 ft)
- Beam: 6.9 m (23 ft)
- Draft: 2.9 m (9.5 ft)
- Propulsion: two Normand boilers, 860 kW
- Speed: 15 knots (28 km/h)
- Range: 700 nautical miles (1,300 km) at 15 knots
- Complement: 1930: 48; 1942: 63
- Armament: In 1920s: 2 × 75 mm; 12 mines; In 1939: 2 × 75 mm/50; 2 × 20 mm Madsen AA; 2 × machine gun; 2 × DC mortar (SPH/37); 30 mines; In 1944: 2 × 75 mm/50; 3 × 20 mm Madsen AA; 1 × 12.7 mm machine gun; 2 × DC mortar (SPH/43); 30 mines

Karjala (ex-Filin) was a Finnish gunboat, built in 1918 at Ab Crichton shipyard in Turku. She served in the Finnish Navy during World War II. Karjala was named after the Finnic cultural region of Karelia. Like her sister ship Turunmaa, she served as cadet training vessel during peacetime and was nicknamed as Kurjala (place of misery) by cadets.

== Interwar period ==
From summer of 1919 Karjala amongst other Finnish naval vessels was tasked with security and patrol duties the Koivisto region where the British naval detachment was located. During prohibition in Finland in 1925 some illegal alcohol had been smuggled onboard Karjala by cadets. Some of the alcohol was spilled to a nearby lantern which ignited the liquid resulting in an explosion which injured several cadets. Event became known as the 'second blast of Karelia' after the Viborg blast of 1495.

On 4 September 1939 Karjala as part of the Coastal Fleet was moved to the Sea of Åland. However, as Karjala was replaced by Hämeenmaa the ship sailed to Kotka already on 18 September. For the rest of the autumn Karjala patrolled the waters from Kotka to Koivisto together with Turunmaa.

== Winter War ==
On 4 December 1939 had Finnish coastal facilities at Koivisto saw lights moving in the sea. This appeared to be minesweeping effort for two days later group of Soviet destroyers sailed in to shell Finnish coastal facilities. On 7 December 1939 Karjala was sent to tow Finnish submarine Saukko along with three motor torpedo boats to Koivisto both to lay mines and to intercept the Soviet ships. Detachment however did not succeed in either of its goals.

On 4 January 1940 Karjala reached Åland to join the Coastal Fleet. She participated in anti-submarine patrols which continued until the sea froze on 30 January.

== Continuation War ==
On 29 August Karjala together with her sister ship Turunmaa, and gunboats Hämeenmaa and Uusimaa were escorted by Riilahti and Ruotsinsalmi through the main Soviet mine barrier south of Hanko to the eastern Gulf of Finland.

While returning with Uusimaa from escorting a troop ship on 3 September Karjala was bombed by German Heinkel He 111 bomber near Koivisto. Though the aircraft scored no direct hits the shocks from several near-misses forced Karjala to undergo repairs at a shipyard. On 29 October Karjala which had just returned from repairs joined with Turunmaa in shelling the island of Sommers, where a Finnish landing attempt had previously been turned back.

Most of the war Karjala like other Finnish gunboats was tasked with guarding of the mine barriers north-east of Hogland and performing anti-submarine patrols in the same region. However, when it became apparent on 12 July 1942 that Soviet submarines had managed to bypass the mine barrier Karjala was sent to strengthen the escorts protecting the shipping between Sweden and Finland.
