= Golub-class guard ship =

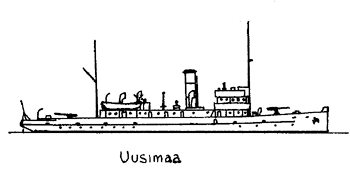
- Sketch of Uusimaa

Class overview
- Builders: Kone ja Silta Oy and Sandvikens Skeppsdocka och Mekaniska Verkstad, Helsinki, Finland
- Operators: Imperial Russian Navy; Imperial German Navy; Finnish Navy; Chilean Navy
- Built: 1916–1919
- In commission: 1916–?
- Completed: 6
- Lost: ?
- Scrapped: At least 2

General characteristics
- Type: Gunboat
- Displacement: 400 tons
- Length: 52 m (171 ft)
- Beam: 7.5 m (25 ft)
- Draft: 3.4 m (11 ft)
- Installed power: 1,400 shp (1,000 kW)
- Speed: 15 knots (28 km/h; 17 mph)
- Complement: 73
- Armament: Golub-class: 2 × 102 mm cannon (Obuhov 102/60); 1 × 40 mm gun AA; 3 × machine guns; Uusimaa in 1944: 2 × 105 mm (105/45); 2 × 40 mm Bofors AA; 3 × 20 mm Madsen AA; 2 × DC mortar (SPH/37); 40 mines

Golub-class guard ships were originally built as minelayers and netlayers for the Imperial Russian Navy. Two of the ships were captured by the Germans at Tallinn in 1918 and were given to Finland in 1920. Four more were completed in 1919 and sold via Germans to Chilean Navy (eventually named as Colocolo, Leucoton, Elicura, and Orompello).

The ships had fairly good seagoing abilities and were stable platforms. They were especially well suited for heavy minesweeping duties.

== Golub class ==
Ship	Launched	Commission	Owner	Fate
Golub; Beo; Uusimaa	1917	1917-1918; 1918-1920; 1920-1952	Imperial Russian Navy; Imperial German Navy; Finnish Navy	Captured by Germans 1918; Given over to Finland 1920; Sold for scrap 1953
Pingvin; Wulf; Hämeenmaa	1917	1917-1918; 1918-1920; 1920-1952	Imperial Russian Navy; Imperial German Navy; Finnish Navy	Captured by Germans 1918; Given over to Finland 1920; Sold for scrap 1953
Colo Colo	1919	-	Chilean Navy	Laid down as Russian Chibis
Leucoton	1919	-	Chilean Navy	Laid down as Russian Strizh
Elicura	1919	-	Chilean Navy	Laid down as Russian Kulik
Orompello	1919	-	Chilean Navy	Laid down as Russian Bekas
