= Finnish patrol gunboat VTV-1 =

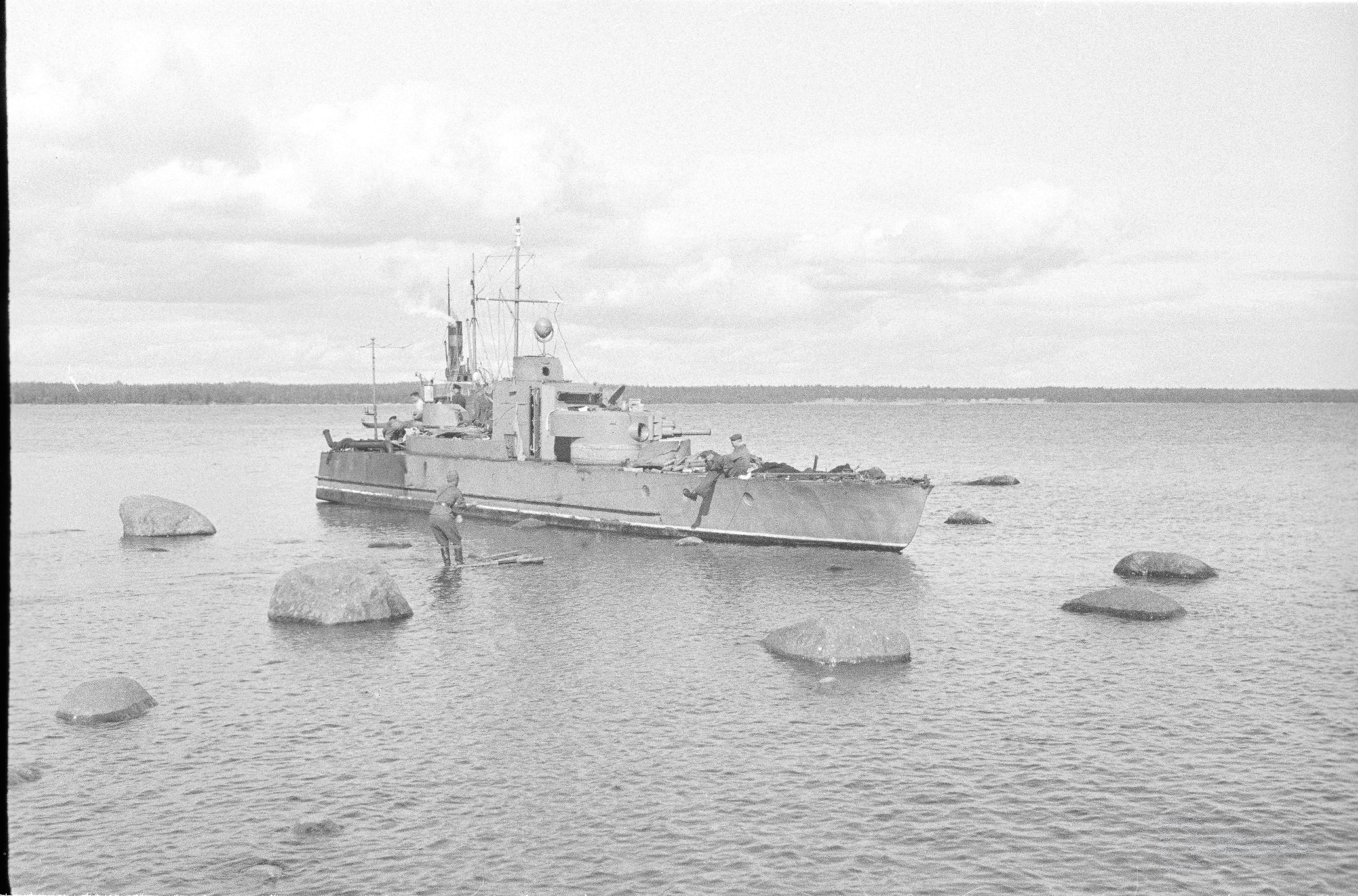

History

Soviet Union
- Name: B-215
- Operator: Baltic Fleet
- Builder: Zelenodolsk Shipyard
- Laid down: 1939
- Launched: Spring 1940
- Acquired: Summer 1940
- Commissioned: 12 July 1940
- Renamed: No. 215, 1941
- Captured: Finland, 25 August 1941

Finland
- Name: VTV-1
- Operator: Finnish Navy
- Commissioned: 1941
- Decommissioned: 1944
- Fate: Returned to the Soviet Union, 1944

Soviet Union
- Operator: Baltic Fleet
- Recommissioned: 1944
- Decommissioned: N/A
- Renamed: BK-60, 20 December 1944
- Fate: N/A

General characteristics
- Class & type: Type 1125BKA armoured motor gunboat
- Displacement: 29 tonnes (29 long tons; 32 short tons)
- Length: 22.6 m (74 ft 2 in)
- Beam: 3.4 m (11 ft 2 in)
- Draft: 0.6 m (2 ft 0 in)
- Propulsion: 1 × petrol engine
- Speed: 17.5 knots (32.4 km/h; 20.1 mph)
- Complement: 14
- Armament: Initially: 1 × 76.2 mm (3 in) tank gun; 9 × machine guns; Later: 1 × 76.2 mm tank gun; 1 × 20 mm AA gun; 6 × machine guns

VTV-1 (with VTV an initialism for vartiotykkivene, 'patrol gunboat') was originally a Soviet Type 1125BKA armoured motor gunboat with the designation No. 215. It was captured by Finnish troops in 1941, after it had been damaged by artillery fire and beached by its crew. The Finns swiftly repaired the ship, and VTV-1 took part in a reconnaissance-in-force aimed at the island of Sommers in October 1941.

VTV-1 was transferred to Lake Onega in June 1942. It was the only ship of the Finnish Onega Flotilla that could truly be considered a match for any of the opposing Soviet naval vessels on the lake. Once Finnish forces started withdrawing from Onega VTV-1 was transported by rail to Finland. The ship was returned to the Soviet Union in 1944.
