= Filin-class guard ship =

Ships built in Finland for the Imperial Russian Navy

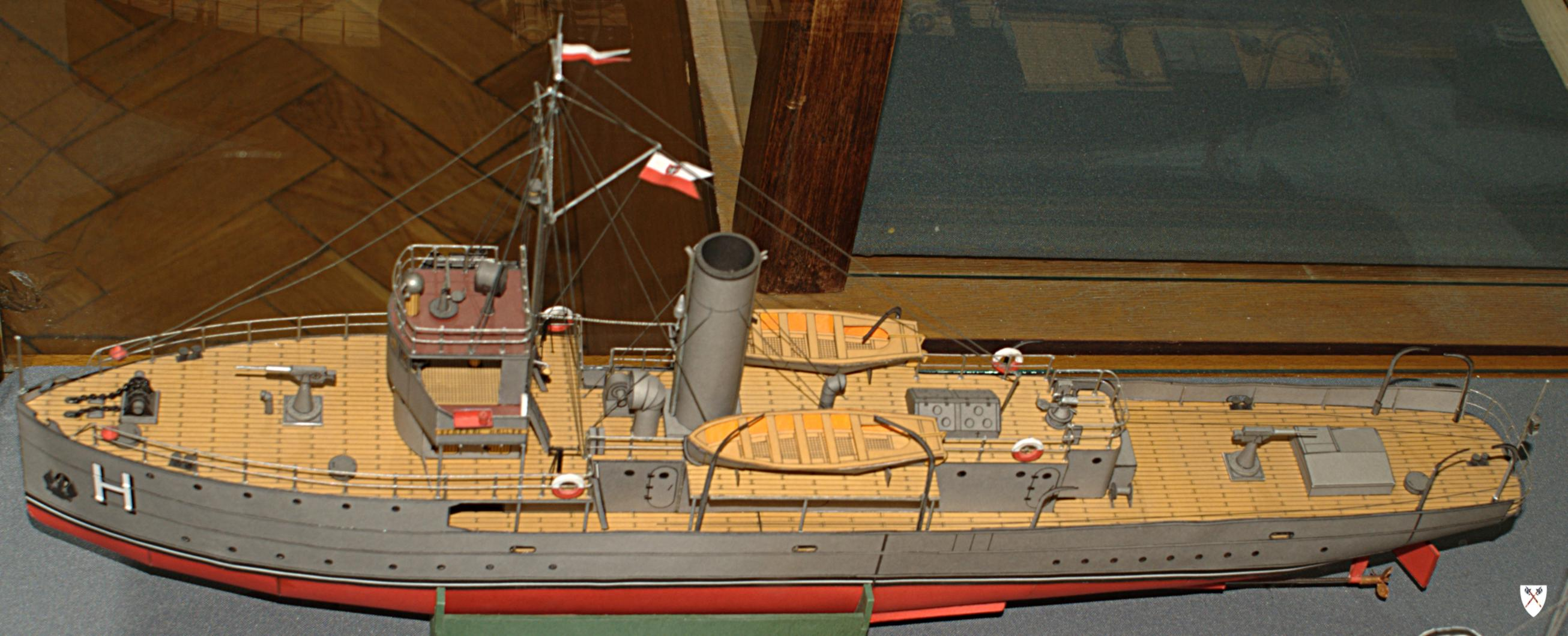
- Model of ORP General Haller

Class overview
- Builders: Ab Crichton; Turku, Finland
- Operators: Finnish Navy; Polish Navy; Kriegsmarine
- Built: 1918-1919
- In commission: 1918–1952 (Finnish Navy); 1921-1939 (Polish Navy); 1939-1943 (Kriegsmarine)
- Planned: 6
- Completed: 4
- Lost: 2
- Scrapped: 2

General characteristics
- Type: Gunboat
- Displacement: 342 tons
- Length: 50 m (160 ft)
- Beam: 7 m (23 ft 0 in)
- Draft: 2.9 m (9 ft 6 in)
- Installed power: 1,150 shp (860 kW)
- Speed: 15 knots (28 km/h; 17 mph)
- Complement: 48–63
- Armament: Filin class: 1 × 75 mm/50 gun; 1 × 40 mm gun AA; Turunmaa after 1941; 2 × 75 mm/50 guns; 3 × 20 mm Madsen AA; 1 × 12.7 mm machine gun; 2 × DC mortar (SPH/37 or SPH/43); 30 mines

Filin-class guard ships were a class of ships originally built in Finland as patrol vessels for the Imperial Russian Navy. With the withdrawal of Russia from the area, the ships went to other use.

== Overview ==
Four ships were constructed, two of them were sold to Polish Navy where they served as General Haller and Komendant Piłsudski and the other two were commissioned into the Finnish Navy as Turunmaa and Karjala.

They were initially classified as patrol cruisers though the name did not describe them well. The class had good accommodation for their size but they hardly resembled a warship. Foreign observers' comments on the ships of the class in Finnish service was that they were 'graceful tugs'. The ships were only suitable for coastal patrolling as they were not particularly seaworthy and their structural strength and power were limited. Also the structure did not allow guns larger than 75 mm to be installed.

== Ships in class ==
Ship	Laid down as	Launched	In commission	Service with	Notes
Turunmaa	Tshirok; Orlan	1918	1918 - 1952	Finnish Navy	Sold for scrap 1953
Karjala	Filin	1918	1918 - 1952	Finnish Navy	Sold for scrap 1953
General Haller	Vodorez	1919	1921 - 1939	Polish Navy	Sunk September 1939
Komendant Piłsudski; Heisternest	Lun	1919	1921-1939; 1939-1943	Polish Navy; Kriegsmarine	Sunk September 1939; Raised 1939. Sunk September 1943.
Gorlitsa	Gorlitsa	-	-	-	Never completed, scrapped
Sova	Sova	-	-	-	Never completed, scrapped

Last two ships of the same class - Gorlitsa and Sova - were being constructed before the work on them was halted. They were never completed and instead were scrapped.
