= ORP General Haller =

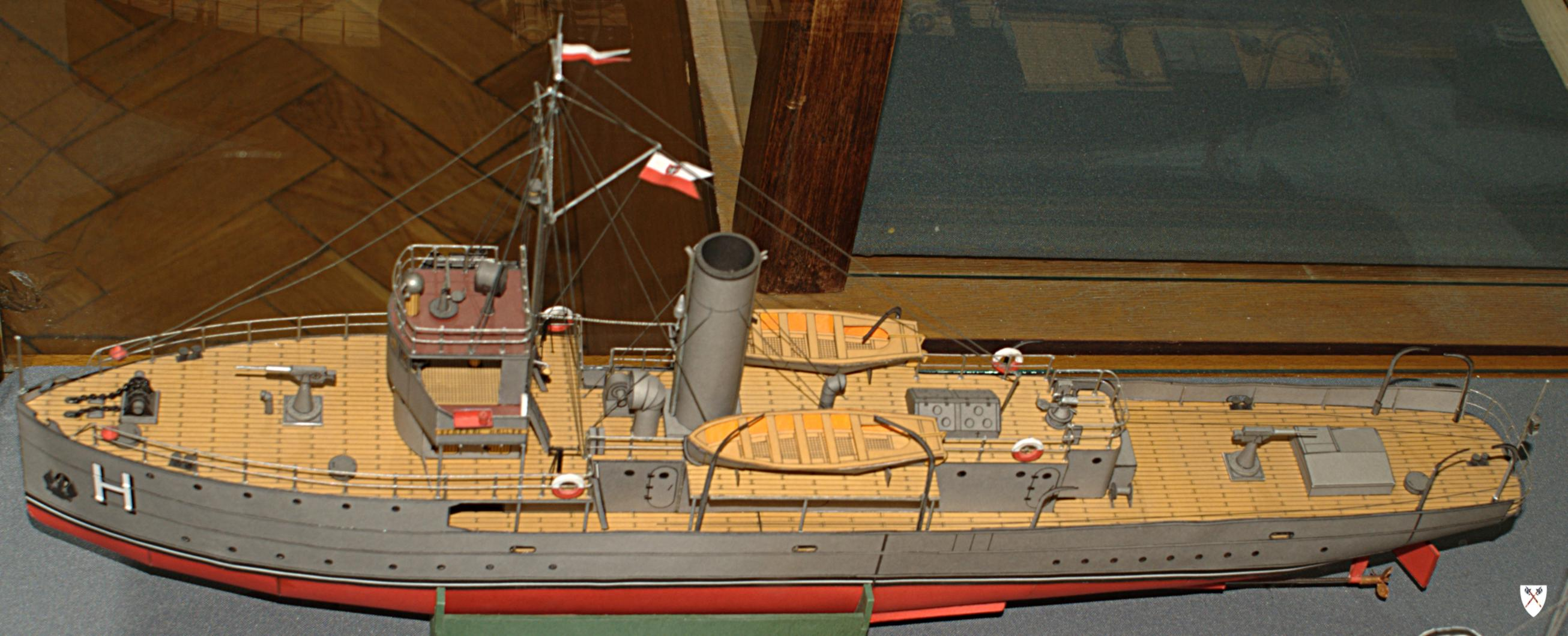
- ORP General Haller (model)

History

Russian Empire
- Name: Vodorez
- Builder: Ab Crichton; Turku, Finland
- Launched: 1916
- Fate: Sold to Poland, 1921

Poland
- Name: ORP General Haller
- Namesake: Józef Haller
- Acquired: 1921
- Fate: Sunk, 6 September 1939

General characteristics
- Class & type: Filin-class guard ship
- Displacement: 342 tons
- Length: 55 m (180 ft 5 in)
- Beam: 7 m (23 ft 0 in)
- Draft: 2.9 m (9 ft 6 in)
- Speed: 14.5 knots (26.9 km/h; 16.7 mph)
- Complement: 60
- Armament: 2 × 75 mm (3.0 in) guns; 2 × 7.92 mm Maxim wz.08 machine guns; 30 × mines

ORP General Haller was a Filin-class guard ship originally built for the Imperial Russian Navy. She was later acquired by the Polish Navy and served until sunk during the Invasion of Poland on 6 September 1939 as a result of the bombing of German aircraft.

== History ==
General Haller was built at Ab Crichton in Turku, Finland, for the Imperial Russian Navy. She was bought by the Polish Navy in 1921 and subsequently served as a school ship and minelayer. In Poland, she was classified as kanonierka (gunboat).

On 1 September 1939, under the command of Captain Stanisław Mieszkowski, General Haller was patrolling the port of Gdynia, where she was damaged in air attacks. On 2 September, the gunboat was sent to the naval port at Hel. There she was turned into a floating battery, until on 3 September, after major bomb damage, all the guns were stripped and added to the defences on land. She was left floating until she was sunk on 6 September.
