= Soviet gunboat Krasnoye Znamya =

Soviet and Russian gunboat (1897–1960)

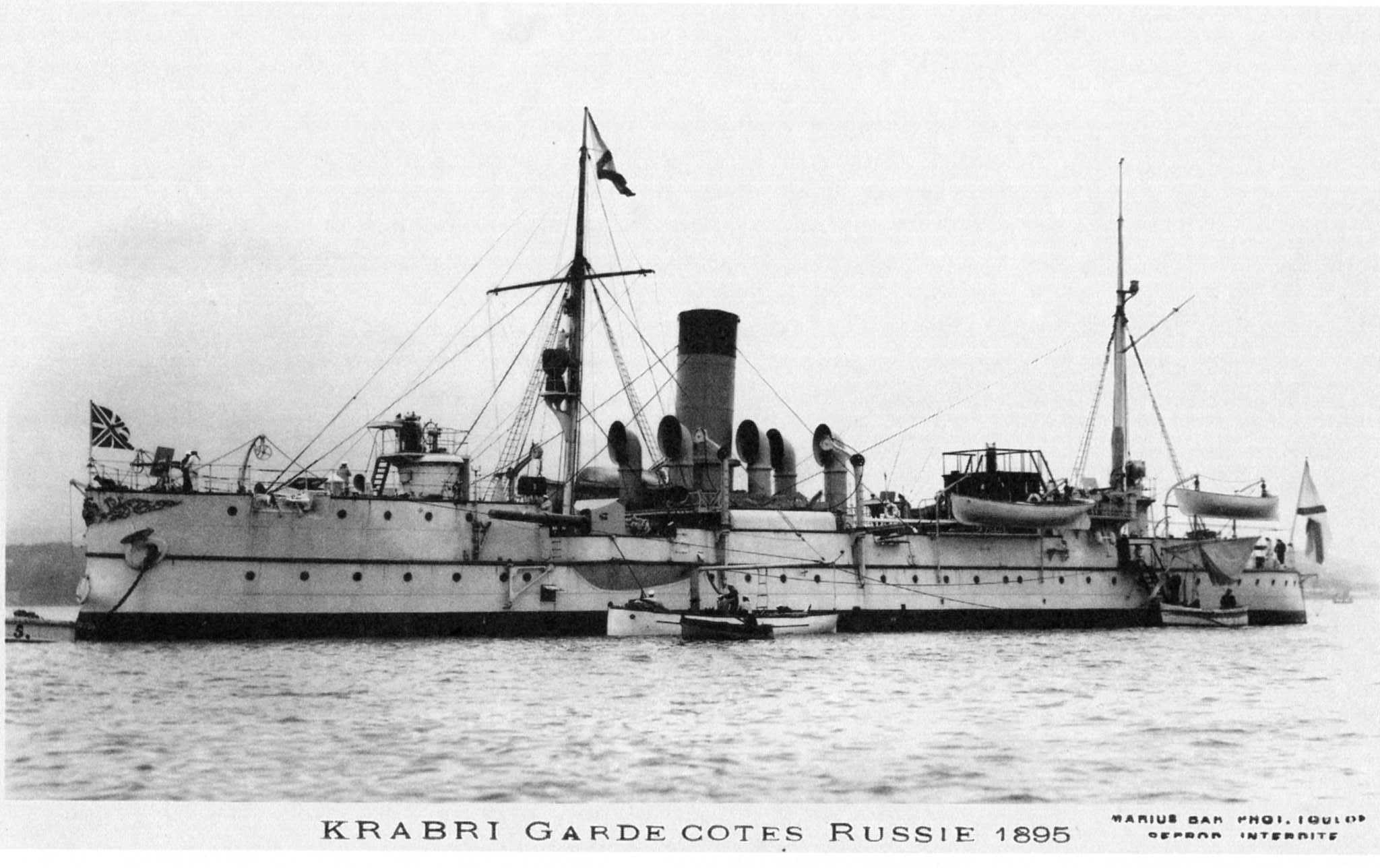
- The Imperial Russian gunboat Khrabryy

History

Russian Empire
- Name: Khabry
- Builder: Admiralty Shipyard, Saint Petersburg
- Laid down: 15 December 1894
- Launched: 9 November 1895
- Completed: 10 September 1897

History

Soviet Union
- Commissioned: 29 January 1918
- Recommissioned: 17 September 1944
- Renamed: Krasnoye Znamya, 31 December 1922
- Reclassified: As training ship, 1922; As gunboat, 15 March 1940; As training ship, 7 April 1956; As accommodation ship, 13 March 1959
- Stricken: 20 June 1960
- Fate: Sunk, 16 November 1942, raised 13 November 1943

General characteristics (as rebuilt 1937–1939)
- Class & type: Krasnoye Znamya-class gunboat
- Displacement: 1,530 t (1,510 long tons) (standard)
- Length: 69.26 m (227 ft 3 in)
- Beam: 12.7 m (41 ft 8 in)
- Draft: 3.9 m (12 ft 10 in)
- Installed power: 2 Yarrow boilers; 2,200 PS (1,600 kW)
- Propulsion: 2 shafts; 2 triple-expansion steam engines
- Speed: 14 knots (26 km/h; 16 mph)
- Range: 1,100 nautical miles (2,000 km; 1,300 mi) at 8 knots (15 km/h; 9.2 mph)
- Complement: 201
- Armament: 5 × single 130 mm (5.1 in) guns; 7 × single 45 mm (1.8 in) AA guns; 1 × twin 12.7 mm (0.50 in) machine gun; 50 mines
- Armor: Belt: 75–125 mm (3.0–4.9 in); Deck: 25 mm (1.0 in); Conning tower: 25–38 mm (1.0–1.5 in); Bulkhead: 80 mm (3.1 in)

Krasnoye Znamya (Красное Знамя, Red Banner, ex-Khrabryy) was a Soviet gunboat. The ship had been built in the 1890s as the Khrabry (Храбрый, Brave) for the Imperial Russian Navy. She was completed in 1897 and assigned to the Baltic Fleet. During the First World War, the ship participated in the Battle of Moon Sound in 1917. Her crew joined the Bolsheviks after the October Revolution that same year and she was commissioned into the Soviet Navy in early 1918. Khabry was renamed Krasnoye Znamya in 1922. She was rebuilt in 1937–1939. The gunboat was sunk in the harbor of Lavansaari in the Gulf of Finland in 1942 during an attack by Finnish MTBs. The ship was salvaged the following year and recommissioned in 1944.

== Construction and career ==
Khabry was laid down at the New Admiralty Shipyard in Saint Petersburg on 15 December 1894, launched on 9 November 1895 and completed on 10 September 1897. The ship participated in the Battle of Moon Sound in October 1917. The Russian fleet was attempting to defend Soela Strait from an attempt by the German Baltic Fleet to break through it and trap Russian forces on Saaremaa Island. After inconclusive engagements on 12 and 13 October, Rear Admiral Mikhail Bakhirev, commander of the Russian naval force, anticipated another attempt to force the entrance on 14 October and positioned four destroyers and Khabry at the east end of the strait where they could quickly react to the Germans. That afternoon, the Germans attacked and hit the destroyer Grom, causing her to lose power, and also started a fire. Khrabry was ordered to assist Grom. Many of Grom's crew fled to the gunboat, but an attempt to tow the destroyer was unsuccessful, not least because the Germans continued to make hits on Grom, and the ship had to be abandoned.

Khabry's crew joined the Bolsheviks after the October Revolution in 1917 and she was commissioned into the Soviet Navy on 29 January 1918. The ship was renamed to Krasnoye Znamya on 31 December 1922. She was rebuilt and modernized in 1937–1939.

=== The sinking of Krasnoye Znamya ===
After the Moscow Peace Treaty of 1940 between Finland and the Soviet Union that ended the Winter War, the island of Lavansaari had been handed over to the Soviets. During the Continuation War the island was a Soviet naval base and housed a radar station. On 18 November 1942, the three Finnish motor torpedo boats Syöksy, Vinha and Vihuri made an assault on the harbour of Lavansaari. Krasnoye Znamya is hit by two torpedoes, sinking her at her moorings and killing 64 crewmen. The gunboat was salvaged on 13 November 1943 and recommissioned on 17 September 1944.

== Bibliography ==
- Barrett, Michael B. (2008). Operation Albion: The German Conquest of the Baltic Islands. Indiana University Press. ISBN 978-0-253-34969-9.
- Budzbon, Przemysław; Radziemski, Jan & Twardowski, Marek (2022). Warships of the Soviet Fleets 1939–1945. Vol. I: Major Combatants. Naval Institute Press. ISBN 978-1-68247-877-6.
- Harris, Mark (2025). The First World War in the Baltic Sea. Vol. 1: Essen's Triumph, 1914 to February 1915. Helion. ISBN 978-1-804519-10-3.
- Platonov, Andrey V. (2002). Энциклопедия советских надводных кораблей 1941–1945 [Encyclopedia of Soviet Surface Ships 1941–1945] (in Russian). Poligon. ISBN 5-89173-178-9.
- Rohwer, Jürgen (2005). Chronology of the War at Sea 1939–1945: The Naval History of World War Two (Third Revised ed.). Naval Institute Press. ISBN 1-59114-119-2.
