= Filin (surname) =

Filin (Russian: Филин, meaning eagle-owl) is a gender-neutral Russian surname that may refer

- Ivan Filin (1926–2000), Soviet marathon runner
- Oleksandr Filin (born 1996), Ukrainian football defender
- Sergei Filin (born 1970), Russian ballet dancer and artistic director
