= ORP Komendant Piłsudski =

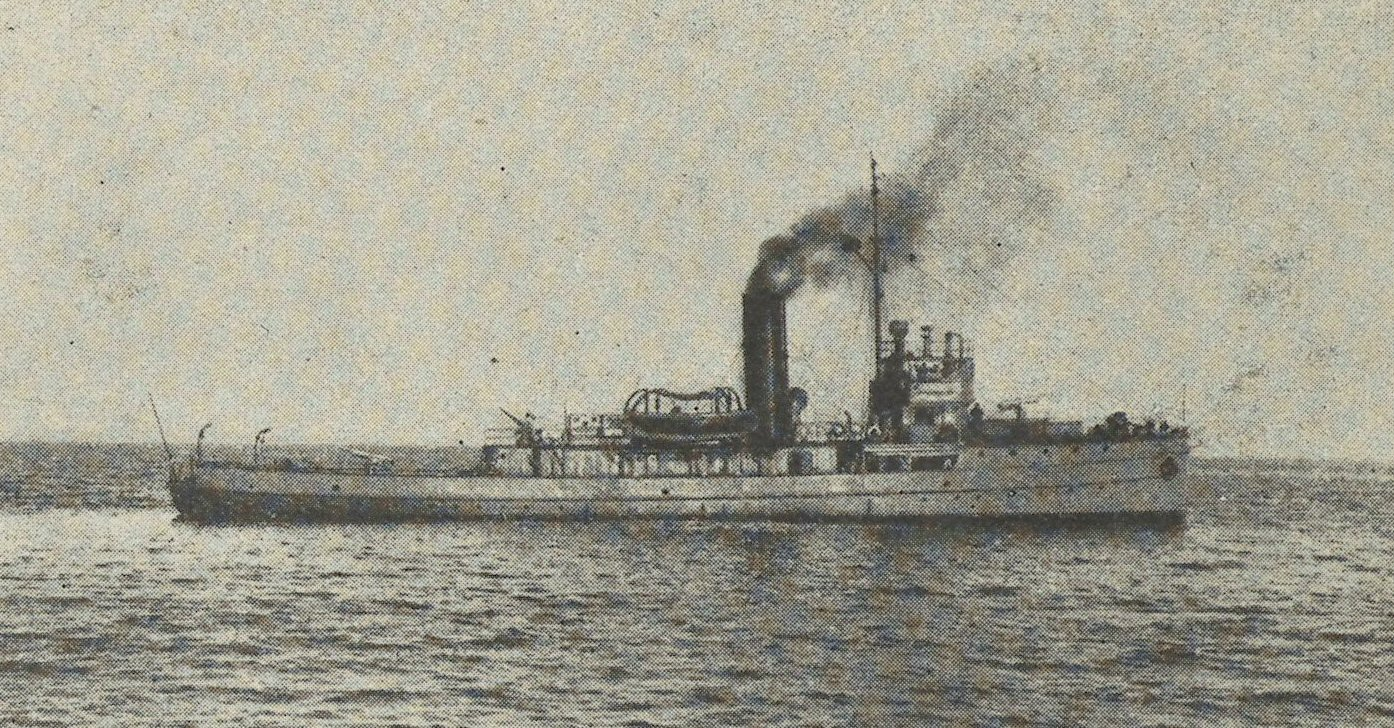
- ORP Komendant Piłsudski

History

Imperial Russia
- Builder: Ab Crichton; Turku, Finland
- Launched: January 24, 1917
- Fate: Sold to Poland, 1920

Poland
- Name: ORP Komendant Piłsudski
- Acquired: 1921
- Fate: Sunk, September 30, 1939

Nazi Germany
- Name: Heisternest (M 3109)
- Acquired: Raised after September 30, 1939
- Fate: Sunk, September 16, 1943

General characteristics
- Class & type: Filin-class guard ship
- Displacement: 342 tons
- Length: 55 m (180 ft 5 in)
- Beam: 7 m (23 ft 0 in)
- Draft: 2.9 m (9 ft 6 in)
- Speed: 14.5 knots (26.9 km/h; 16.7 mph)
- Complement: 60
- Armament: 2 × 3 in (76 mm) guns; 4 × machine guns; 30 × mines

ORP Komendant Piłsudski was a Filin-class guard ship from the interwar period originally built at Ab Crichton in Turku, Finland, for the Imperial Russian Navy. She was bought by the Polish Navy in 1920 and served until scuttled in the port of Hel during the Invasion of Poland on September 30, 1939.

Raised by the Germans, she was subsequently renamed Heisternest (M 3109) and served in the Kriegsmarine. Heisternest was sunk in a U.S. bomb raid in Nantes, France, on September 16, 1943.
