= Pukkio-class minelayer =

Class of coastal minelayers used by the Finnish Navy during World War II

Class overview
- Name: Pukkio class
- Builders: Valtion venetelakka, Helsinki, Finland
- Operators: Finnish Navy
- Built: 1939-1947
- In commission: 1939-1990
- Completed: 3
- Retired: 3

General characteristics
- Type: Minelayer
- Displacement: 162 tons
- Length: 28 m (92 ft)
- Beam: 6.7 m (22 ft 0 in)
- Draught: 2.5 m (8 ft 2 in)
- Propulsion: 300 hp (220 kW); 1979: Pansio, Porkkala: 420 hp (310 kW); Pukkio: 600 hp (450 kW)
- Speed: 10 knots (19 km/h)
- Complement: 10
- Armament: 1 × 45 mm gun; 1 × 20 mm Madsen AA; 40 mines
- Notes: Ships in class include: Pukkio, Porkkala, Pansio

The Pukkio-class minelayers were class of coastal minelayers used by the Finnish Navy during World War II.

Pukkio (1939) and Porkkala (1940) were completed in time for them to participate in the war, but Pansio (1947) was completed only after the war when the resources needed for ship construction were again available. The ships had been designed primarily to operate as coastal liaison or transport vessels, but they had full minelaying as well as minesweeping equipment installed. However, the only mines the class ever laid were 37 contact mines that Porkkala laid northwest of Tuppura on 30 August 1941.

When Soviet forces had withdrawn from Beryozovye Islands, Finnish forces moved in and constructed coastal artillery batteries in the area. While transporting supplies to these forts, Porkkala ran into a mine on 28 November 1941 and sank taking 32 men with it. The ship was refloated the following spring by submarine salvage vessel Mursu (Walrus), and the salvage crew noticed that Porkkala had deviated 500 meters from the seaway cleared by minesweepers. Porkkala was repaired and refitted and recommissioned.
