= Moshchny Island =

Moschny Island
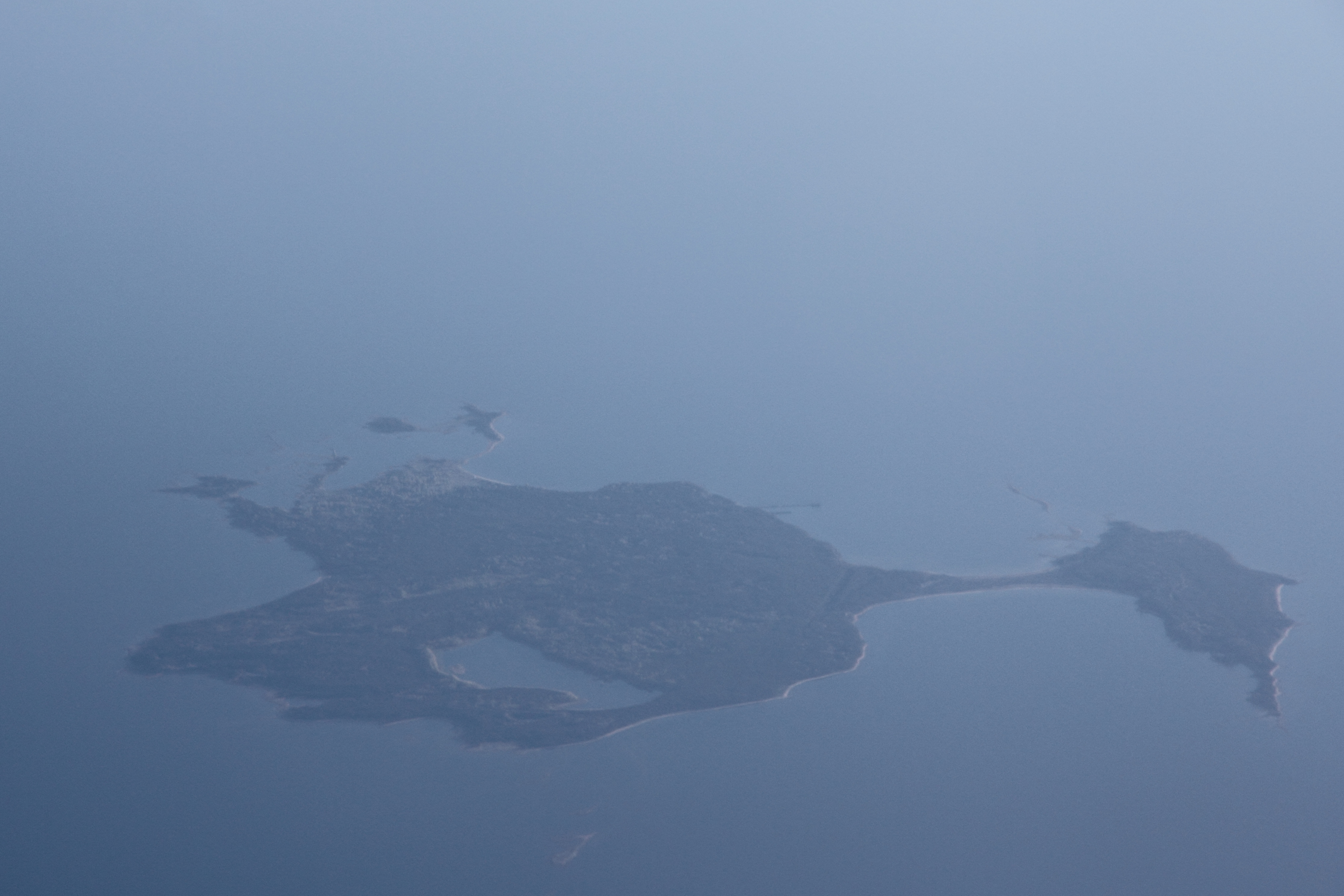
- An aerial view of Moschny Island
- Interactive map of Moschny Island

Geography
- Coordinates: 60°00′N 27°50′E
- Area: 13.9 km^{2} (5.4 sq mi)
- Highest elevation: 30 m (100 ft)

Administration
- Kingiseppsky District, Leningrad Oblast, Russia

Additional information
- Time zone: UTC+3

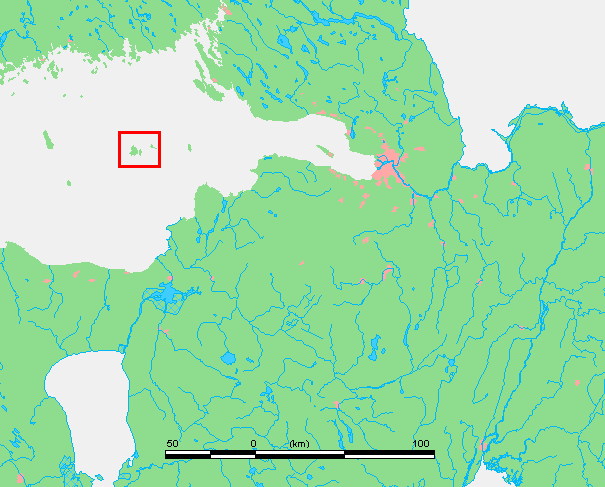
Moshchny island's location in the Gulf of Finland.

Moshchny (Russian: Мощный; Finnish: Lavansaari; Swedish: Lövskär, Estonian: Lavassaar) is an island in the Gulf of Finland of the Baltic Sea, located some 120 km west of Saint Petersburg. The island is a part of Leningrad Oblast, Russia. The area of the island is approximately 13.9 km².

After the Finnish Civil War and until the Russo-Finnish Winter War the island was a part of Finland and belonged to the province of Viipuri. The island, which had the largest population of the Finnish islands in the gulf was evacuated in 1939 - an operation that lasted merely a few hours.

During World War II, when Leningrad was almost entirely surrounded and many other islands had been conquered by the Germans and the Finns, Admiral Tributs decided to keep islands of Seiskari and Lavansaari which proved to be very important bases as the war progressed. The Russians had a minor naval station and a radar on the island. On November 18, 1942 three Finnish motor torpedo boats Syöksy, Vinha and Vihuri, as well as a minelaying KM-boat made an assault on the harbour of Lavansaari. Syöksy managed to hit the gunboat Krasnoye Znamya with one torpedo. The Soviet vessel was sunk in her moorings, but was eventually raised on 13 November 1943.

The German naval forces wanted to prevent the Soviet naval forces from operating to the West of Lavansaari by mine-laying two large sea mine barrages. The Seehund I, II, III and IV barrages ware laid from 3 August to 26 August 1942 and the larger barrage to the West of Seehund, The Seeigel I, II, III, IV, V, VI, VII and VIII barrages from 21 May to 25 May 1942 and from 10 June to 23 June 1942. Both the Seeigel and Seehund barrages were recognised by the Finnish Navy as Suursaari - Kiskolan rivi, i.e. Suursaari - Kiskola line. Seeigel I-IV and VI-VIII consisted of 2 526 pieces of sea mines together with Seeigel V in the depth of from two metres to three metres below the water surface. As an exception to the other barrages, Seeigel V had mines in the 25 metres depth from the water surface. In June the supplementary mine-laying consisted of 244 magnetic seamines, about 3000 anchored depth mines and about 1,630 minesweeping obstacles. The smaller barrage, the Seehund consisted of only about 200 mines and about 250 minesweeping obstacles against the surface vessels and minesweeping.

On 23 June 1943 German bombers sank the Soviet motor torpedo boat, MO-171 off the waters of Lavansaari. On 14 May 1944, a German motor torpedo boat sank the Soviet motor torpedo boat MO-122 with a torpedo.
