= Sommers Light =

Lighthouse in Russia

Sommers Light Ostrov Mayak
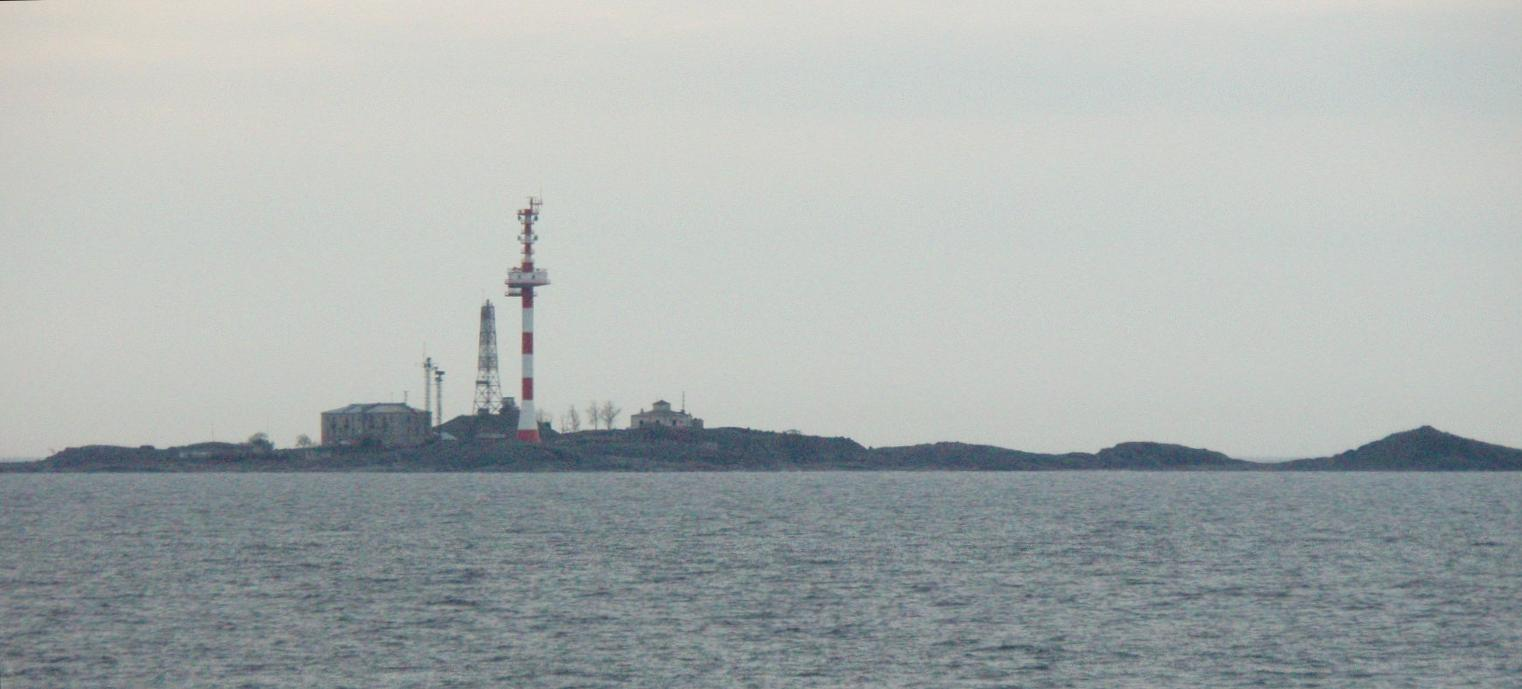
- Sommers in 2007. The lighthouse is the truss construction, while the other constructions are antennae and radar masts.
- Location: Ostrov Mayak (a skerry outside the Gulf of Vyborg), Russia
- Coordinates: 60.2071°N 27.6415°E

Tower
- Constructed: 1808 (first); 1866 (second)
- Foundation: concrete
- Construction: steel skeletal tower
- Height: 37 metres (121 ft)
- Shape: square pyramidal tower with balcony and light
- Markings: red tower, the upper two thirds form a slatted daymark painted red with white bands

Light
- First lit: 1945 (current)
- Focal height: 53 metres (174 ft)
- Characteristic: Fl (2) W 10s.

Sommers (Russian: Соммерс; Finnish: Someri; Swedish: Sommarö) is an islet and a lighthouse in the eastern part of the Gulf of Finland, an arm of the Baltic Sea, just outside the Gulf of Vyborg, about 19 kilometres south of Virolahti, Finland. It is now possessed by Russia. The lighthouse is situated on a rocky skerry, which is elevated a maximum of 16 metres above the Baltic Sea.

== History ==
The first lighthouse on this islet was built in 1808. That construction was a brick building, chalked in white, about five metres high, with a lanternine on its top. The light source was modernized in 1866, and it was also raised to an elevation of eight metres. The lighthouse was given a third class lens system and a clockwork which rotated an oil lamp with a double wick. This gave the lighthouse beacon a reddish gloom.

The lighthouse men lived along with their families in a wooden house next to the lighthouse. A fog horn was constructed at the other end of the island by the beginning of the 20th century. The Imperial Russian Army began constructing defense works on this island when World War I erupted, but these were never completed. In 1918, Finnish maritime authorities staffed the lighthouse.

The old lighthouse was destroyed before the Winter War of 1939–40, and the personnel were evacuated. On New Year's Eve of 1941 a Finnish force of about 100 soldiers was stationed at the island since it had a strategic position. The Soviet Union also wanted to possess the islet, and on 8 July 1942 it attacked the islet with several small warships and aircraft. The Soviets created a foothold on the eastern extent of the island, but due to artillery support from the Finnish islet of Ulko-Tammio (about 19 km (12 mi) northwest of Sommers) the Finns drove the Soviets away on 9 July 1942.

After the 1944 peace treaty between Finland and the Soviet Union, the island of Sommers was given to the Soviets, who also constructed a new truss lighthouse. Its focal plane is about 57 metres (187 ft) above sea level. Its light characteristic is "Fl(2) 10s", i.e., a group of two flashing lights about every ten seconds. There are also a number of buildings and radar masts on the island, probably to keep an eye on the increasingly busy shipping traffic in the area.

== See also ==
- List of lighthouses in Russia
