= Finnish gunboat Hämeenmaa =

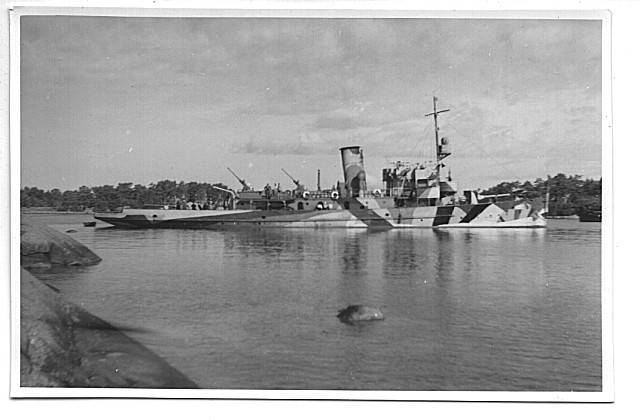
- Hämeenmaa or her sister ship Uusimaa

History

Finland
- Name: Hämeenmaa
- Builder: Kone ja Silta Oy, Helsinki, Finland
- Commissioned: 1917 (Finnish Navy)
- Fate: Scrapped in 1953

General characteristics
- Class & type: Uusimaa-class gunboat
- Displacement: 400 tons
- Length: 52 m (170 ft 7 in)
- Beam: 7.5 m (24 ft 7 in)
- Draft: 3.4 m (11 ft 2 in)
- Propulsion: two boilers, 1,400 shp (1,000 kW)
- Speed: 15 knots (28 km/h; 17 mph)
- Complement: 73
- Armament: In the 1920s: 2 × 102 mm Obukhov (102/60); 12 mines; In 1939: 2 × 102 mm Obuchov (102/60); 1 × 40 mm Bofors AA; 2 × machine gun; 2 × DC mortar (SPH/37); 40 mines; In 1941: 2 × 102 mm Obuchov (102/60); 2 × 40 mm Bofors AA; 1 × 20 mm Madsen AA; 2 × DC mortar (SPH/37); 40 mines; In 1944: 2 × 105 mm (105/45); 2 × 40 mm Bofors AA; 3 × 20 mm Madsen AA; 2 × DC mortar (SPH/37); 40 mines

Hämeenmaa (Finnish pronunciation: [ˈhæmeːmˌmɑː]) was a gunboat that served in the Finnish Navy during World War II. She was built in 1917. As the ship had changed hands many times (along with her sister ship Uusimaa) during the turbulent last years of World War I she had been renamed many times: In Russian service, she was called Pingvin; later, in German service, her name was Wulf. Finally, in 1920, the Germans handed her over to the Finns, who renamed her Hämeenmaa. After World War II, she served as a trawler in the Baltic Sea. She was scrapped in 1953.

== Interwar period ==
Hämeenmaa took part in the tragic autumn training cruise of the Finnish Navy in 1925 when the Finnish torpedo boat S2 foundered in heavy seas. Hämeenmaa started leaking during the storm and when it finally reached the dock at Veitsiluoto its rear deck was already at sea level.

In September 1939 Hämeenmaa joined with the Finnish Coastal Fleet in vicinity of Åland to relieve Karjala and later patrolled the northern Baltic Sea and the Sea of Åland together with her sister ship Uusimaa.

== Winter War ==
Hämeenmaa and Uusimaa were detached from the Coastal Fleet on 6 January 1940 to provide escorts for shipping in the Gulf of Bothnia after several submarine sightings had been made north of Åland. When returning to Turku on 25 January 1940 Hämeenmaa damaged its propeller in the ice and had to be docked for repairs.

== Continuation War ==
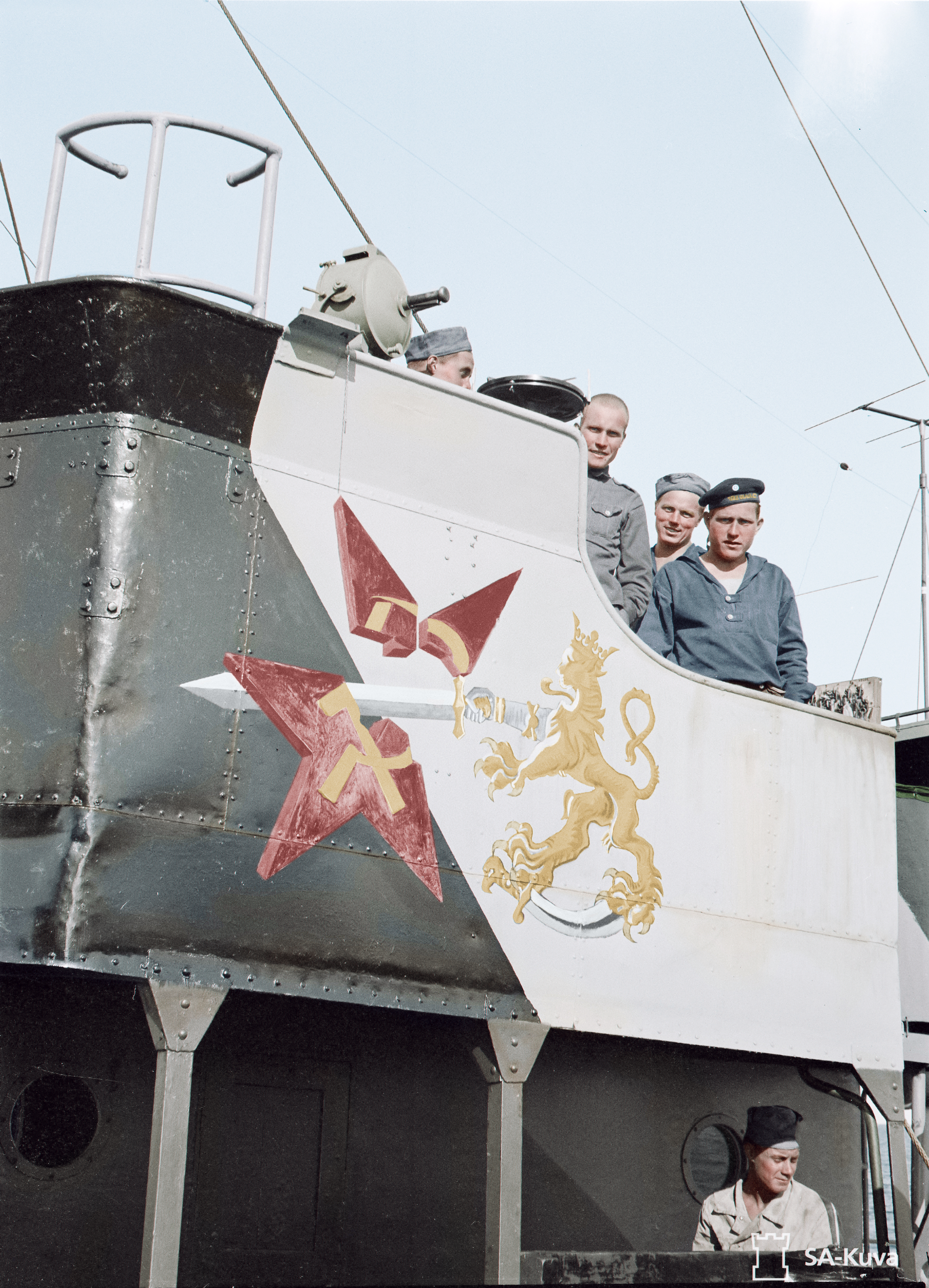
Sailors aboard the Finnish gunboat Hämeenmaa in 1942
