= Finnish gunboat Uusimaa =

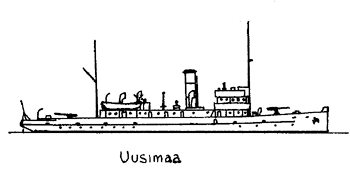

History

Finland
- Name: Uusimaa
- Builder: Kone ja Silta Oy, Helsinki, Finland
- Commissioned: 1917 (Finnish Navy)
- Fate: Scrapped in 1953

General characteristics
- Class & type: Uusimaa-class gunboat
- Displacement: 400 tons
- Length: 52 m (170 ft 7 in)
- Beam: 7.5 m (24 ft 7 in)
- Draft: 3.4 m (11 ft 2 in)
- Propulsion: two boilers, 1,400 shp (1,000 kW)
- Speed: 15 knots (28 km/h; 17 mph)
- Complement: 73
- Armament: In 1920s: 2 × 102 mm Obukhov (102/60); 12 mines; In 1939: 2 × 102 mm Obuchov (102/60); 1 × 40 mm Bofors AA; 2 × machine gun; 2 × DC mortar (SPH/37); 40 mines; In 1941: 2 × 102 mm Obuchov (102/60); 2 × 40 mm Bofors AA; 1 × 20 mm Madsen AA; 2 × DC mortar (SPH/37); 40 mines; In 1944: 2 × 105 mm (105/45); 2 × 40 mm Bofors AA; 3 × 20 mm Madsen AA; 2 × DC mortar (SPH/37); 40 mines

Uusimaa was a gunboat that served in the Finnish Navy during World War II. She was built in 1917. As the ship (like her sister ship Hämeenmaa) had changed hands many times during the turbulent last years of World War I she had been renamed many times: In Russian service, she was called Golub, later, in German service, her name was Beo. Finally the Germans handed her over to the Finns in 1920, who renamed her Uusimaa. After World War II, she served as a trawler in the Baltic Sea. She was scrapped in 1953.

== Interwar period ==
On 4 September 1939, Uusimaa sailed as part of the Finnish Coastal Fleet to the vicinity of Åland and later patrolled the northern Baltic Sea and the Sea of Åland together with her sister ship Hämeenmaa.

== Winter War ==
Uusimaa escorted minelayer Louhi on 1 December 1939 when she laid mines to the seaways near Kökar and Utö. When following minelaying attempt on 3 December by Louhi failed and the minelayer was damaged Uusimaa laid part of the mines on 4 December. Hämeenmaa and Uusimaa were detached from the Coastal Fleet on 6 January 1940 to provide escorts for shipping in the Gulf of Bothnia after several submarine sightings had been made north of Åland.

== See also ==
- Chilean minelayer Colo Colo (1917), sister ship

=== Citations ===
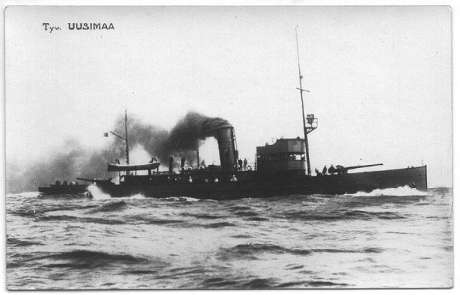
Uusimaa

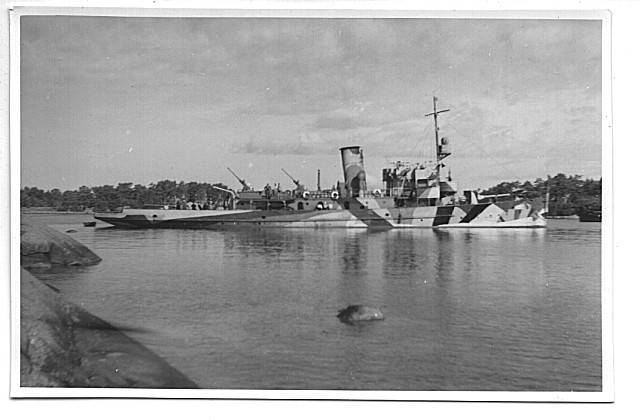
Uusimaa or Hämeenmaa

=== Bibliography ===
- Auvinen, Visa (1983). Leijonalippu merellä [Lion flag at sea] (in Finnish). Pori, Finland: Satakunnan Kirjapaino Oy. ISBN 951-95781-1-0.
- Kijanen, Kalervo (1968a). Suomen Laivasto 1918–1968, I [Finnish Navy 1918–1968, part I] (in Finnish). Helsinki, Finland: Meriupseeriyhdistys/Otavan Kirjapaino.
- Kijanen, Kalervo (1968b). Suomen Laivasto 1918–1968, II [Finnish Navy 1918–1968, part II] (in Finnish). Helsinki, Finland: Meriupseeriyhdistys/Otavan Kirjapaino.
