= CB90-class fast assault craft =

Ship class

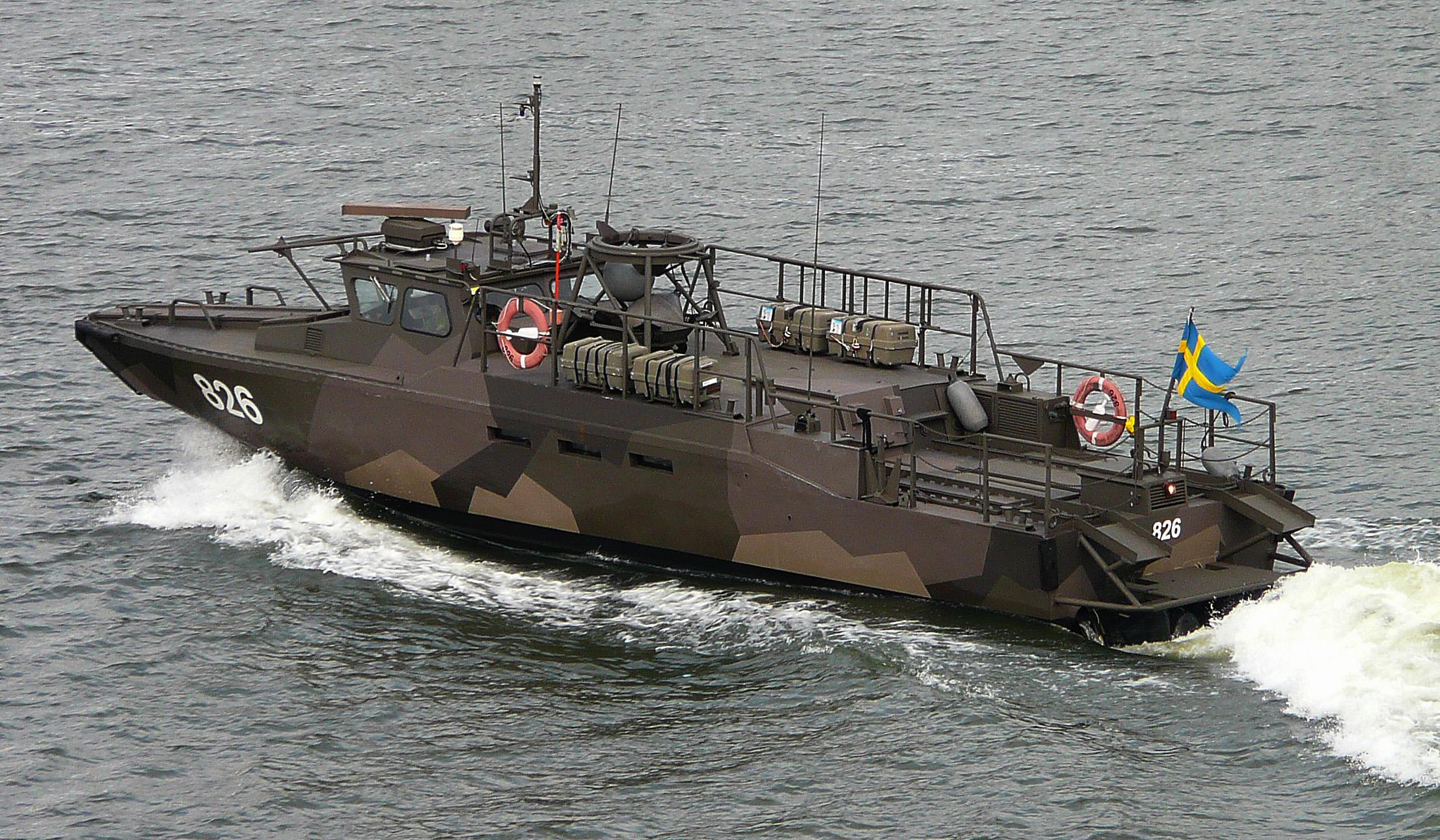
- Combat Boat 90

Class overview
- Builders: Dockstavarvet, Gotlandsvarvet
- Operators: See Operators
- Preceded by: Tpbs 200
- Cost: CB90 HSM: SEK 22.22 million (2017) per unit
- In commission: 1991
- Completed: 250–300

General characteristics
- Displacement: CB 90H / STRB 90H: Empty: 13.3 t (29,000 lb); Full load: initially 18.0 t (39,700 lb), increased to 20.5 t (45,000 lb); CB 90 NG / STRB 90HSM: Light: 18 t (40,000 lb); Full load: 24.5 t (54,000 lb); CB 90 CX: TBA
- Length: LOA (overall length); CB 90H / STRB 90H: 15.9 m (52 ft 2 in); CB 90 NG / STRB 90HSM: 16.3 m (53 ft 6 in); CB 90 CX: 18.0 m (59 ft 1 in)
- Beam: CB 90H / STRB 90H: 3.85 m (12 ft 8 in); CB 90 NG / STRB 90HSM: 3.85 m (12 ft 8 in); CB 90 CX: 4.0 m (13 ft 1 in)
- Draught: CB 90H / STRB 90H: 0.8 m (2 ft 7 in); CB 90 NG / STRB 90HSM: 1.1 m (3 ft 7 in); CB 90 CX: 1.4 m (4 ft 7 in)
- Propulsion: CB 90H / STRB 90H: 2 × Scania DSI14 (V8, 14.2 litres, diesel), each with 625 hp (466 kW), driving Kamewa FF-Jet 450 water jets.; CB 90 NG / STRB 90HSM: 2 × Scania DI13 304M (inline 6, 12.7 litres, turbo-diesel), each with 900 hp (670 kW), driving Kamewa S32 mix-flow water jets; CB 90 CX: 2 × 1,100 hp (820 kW), driving water jets
- Speed: CB 90H / STRB 90H: 40 kn (74 km/h); CB 90 NG / STRB 90HSM: 45 kn (83 km/h); CB 90 CX: > 40 kn (74 km/h) (fully loaded)
- Range: CB 90H / STRB 90H: 240 nmi (440 km) (at 20 kn (37 km/h)); CB 90 NG / STRB 90HSM: 300 nmi (560 km) (at cruise speed); CB 90 CX: 300 nmi (560 km) (at 40 kn (74 km/h) and fully loaded)
- Complement: 3 (two officers and one engineer); Up to 18 amphibious troops with full equipment
- Armament: CB 90H / STRB 90H: 3 × M2HB; CB 90 NG / STRB 90HSM: 1 × Saab Trackfire RWS (with M2 Browning and FN MAG, or M230LF Bushmaster and FN MAG); 2 × side weapons (Dillon Aero M134D, FN M2HB CQB, FN MAG, or MK19 M3); 1 × SLWT; 4 × naval mines or 6 × depth charges; CB 90 CX: ISR: 1 × Saab Trackfire RWS; Anti-ship: 1 × MBDA Marte ER 1 × Saab Trackfire RWS; SHORAD: 1 × Rheinmetall Sea Snake 30×173mm

Stridsbåt 90 H(alv) (Strb 90 H; CB90) is a class of fast military assault craft used by several countries after being originally developed for the Swedish Navy by Dockstavarvet. Its name means Combat Boat 90 Half; the 90 refers to the year of acceptance (1990) and Half refers to the fact that it can carry and deploy a half platoon of amphibious infantry (18 men) fully equipped. The CB90 is an exceptionally fast and agile boat that can execute extremely sharp turns at high speed, decelerate from top speed to a full stop in 2.5 boat lengths, and adjust both its pitch and roll angle while under way. Its low weight, shallow draught, and twin water jets allow it to operate at speeds of up to 40 knots (74 km/h) in shallow coastal waters. The water jets are partially ducted, which, along with underwater control surfaces similar to a submarine's diving planes, gives the CB90 its manoeuvrability.

In addition to the many variants in service with the Swedish Navy under the "Stridsbåt 90H" designation, the CB 90 has been adopted by the navies of Norway (as the S90N), Greece, Mexico (as the CB 90 HMN), the United States (as the Riverine Command Boat), and Malaysia.

== Development and adoption history ==
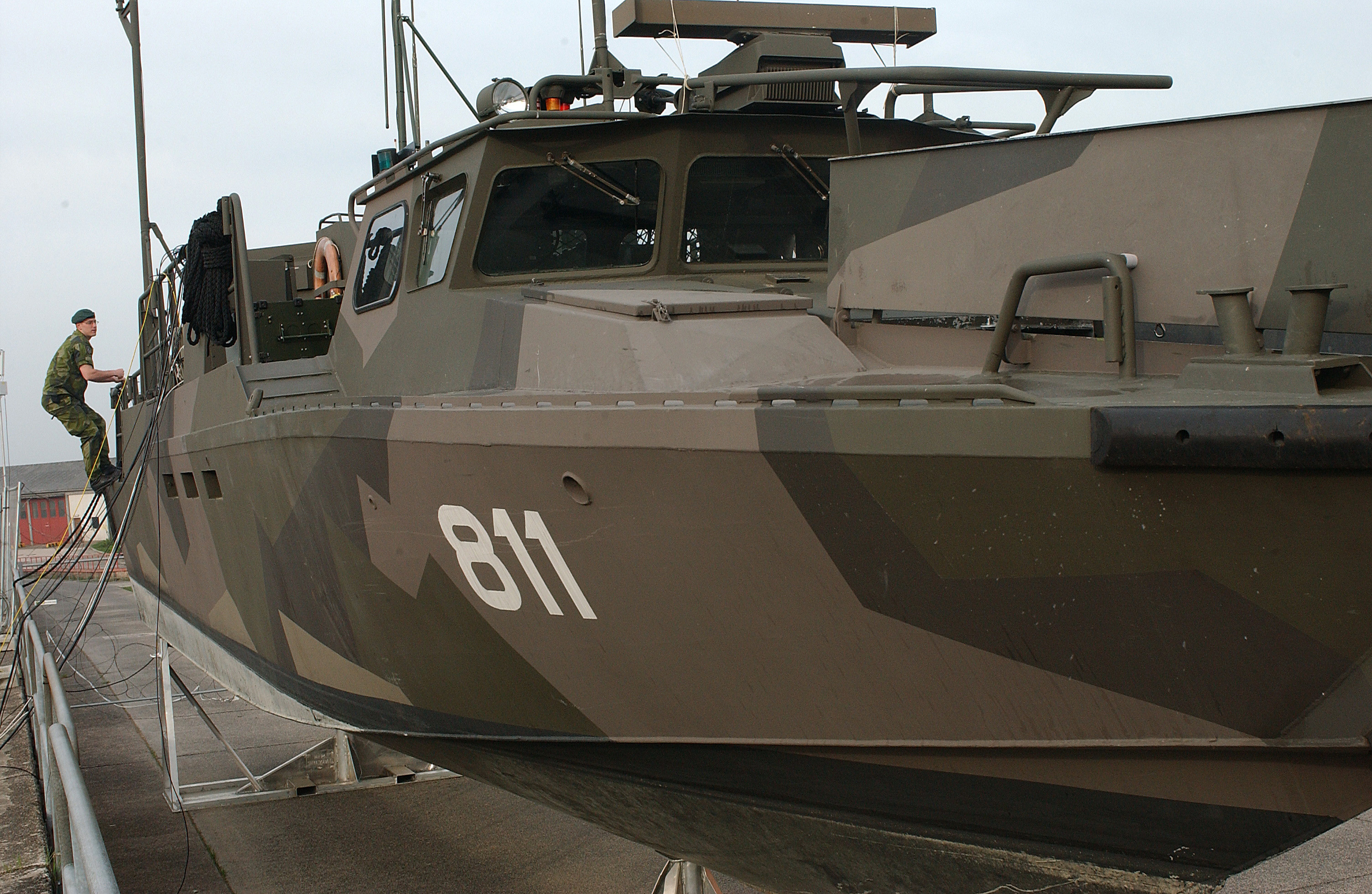
Stridsbåt 90C

In 1988, Dockstavarvet won a competition to design and manufacture a replacement for the ageing Tpbs 200 class. Two prototypes, with pennant number 801 and 802, were delivered in 1989. After the completion of field trials, the Swedish Navy signed a purchase order for 120 boats in June 1990.

In 2002, the Swedish Navy ordered an additional 27 boats of a slightly different type, designated Stridsbåt 90 HS – where S refers to Skydd (protected) as the Strb 90 HS is armoured and features CBRN protection (the whole boat can be over-pressurized) – intended for use in international peace-keeping operations. Apart from the addition of armour, it sports air-conditioning for deployment in tropical conditions, a fuel cooling system, a 230 V generator and more powerful engines. The manufacturer sometimes refers to the model as the CB 90 HI, where the I probably stands for International.

Several of the tasks carried out by the Strb 90 H-variants were originally intended for the Strb 90 E, which is now almost completely phased out.

The Royal Norwegian Navy evaluated the Strb 90 H in early 1996 and subsequently purchased a total of 20 boats, designated 90 N (for Norsk utgave, literally Norwegian version).

The Mexican Navy acquired 40 units (designated CB 90 HMN) between 1999 and 2001, and obtained a production license in 2002, allowing further units to be manufactured in Mexico. Since then eight additional units have been built.

The German Water Police rented a Combat Boat 90H from the manufacturer Dockstavarvet for the 33rd G8 summit in Heiligendamm, Germany. This boat was involved in a high-speed chase with three Greenpeace RIBs who were trying to enter the restricted area near the hotel where the meeting was being held. A video clip of the incident was later widely spread around the internet.

In July 2007 The United States Navy Expeditionary Combat Command (NECC) specified the CB90 for testing as its Riverine Command Boat. SAFE Boats International of Bremerton, Washington, was given a US$2.8 million contract to produce one prototype. The CB90 was subsequently adopted, and two were involved in an incident with Iran in 2016.

In June 2009 an unknown buyer from Abu Dhabi bought two civilian luxury versions.

In 2010, Dockstavarvet Shipyard modified two CB90s to be carried in the davits of Dutch and UK Navy landing platform docks (LPDs). During six-month trials, the two boats and a full Swedish boat squadron were embarked on a Royal Netherlands Navy LPD as a fully integrated element of the amphibious forces aboard and successfully deployed.

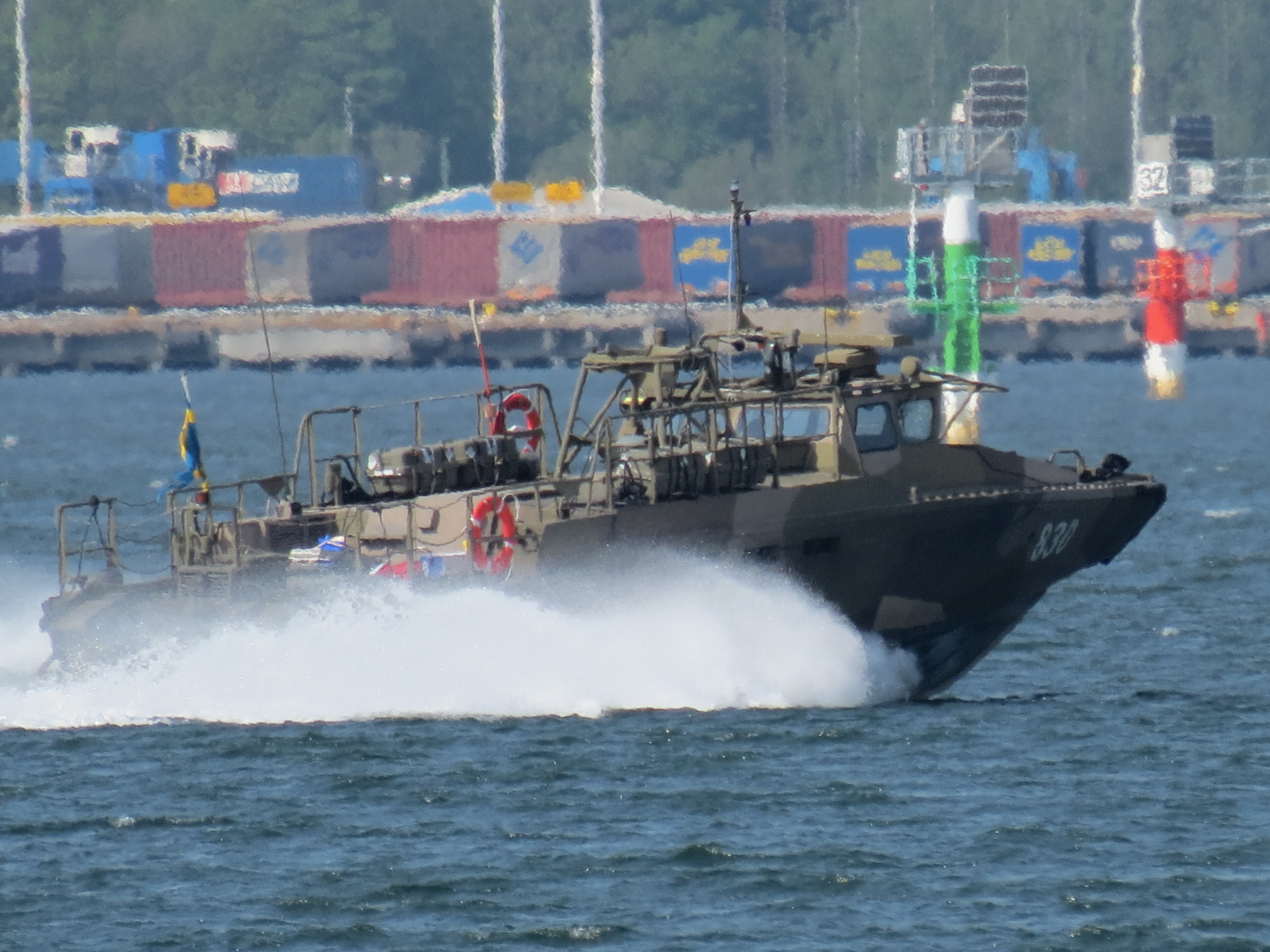
In Gothenburg, Sweden

In 2013 JSC Pella Shipyard near St Petersburg in Russia launched the first Raptor-class patrol boat; while the Russian boats are strikingly similar, there is no indication Dockstavarvet has been involved or licensed the design to Pella.

== Versions ==
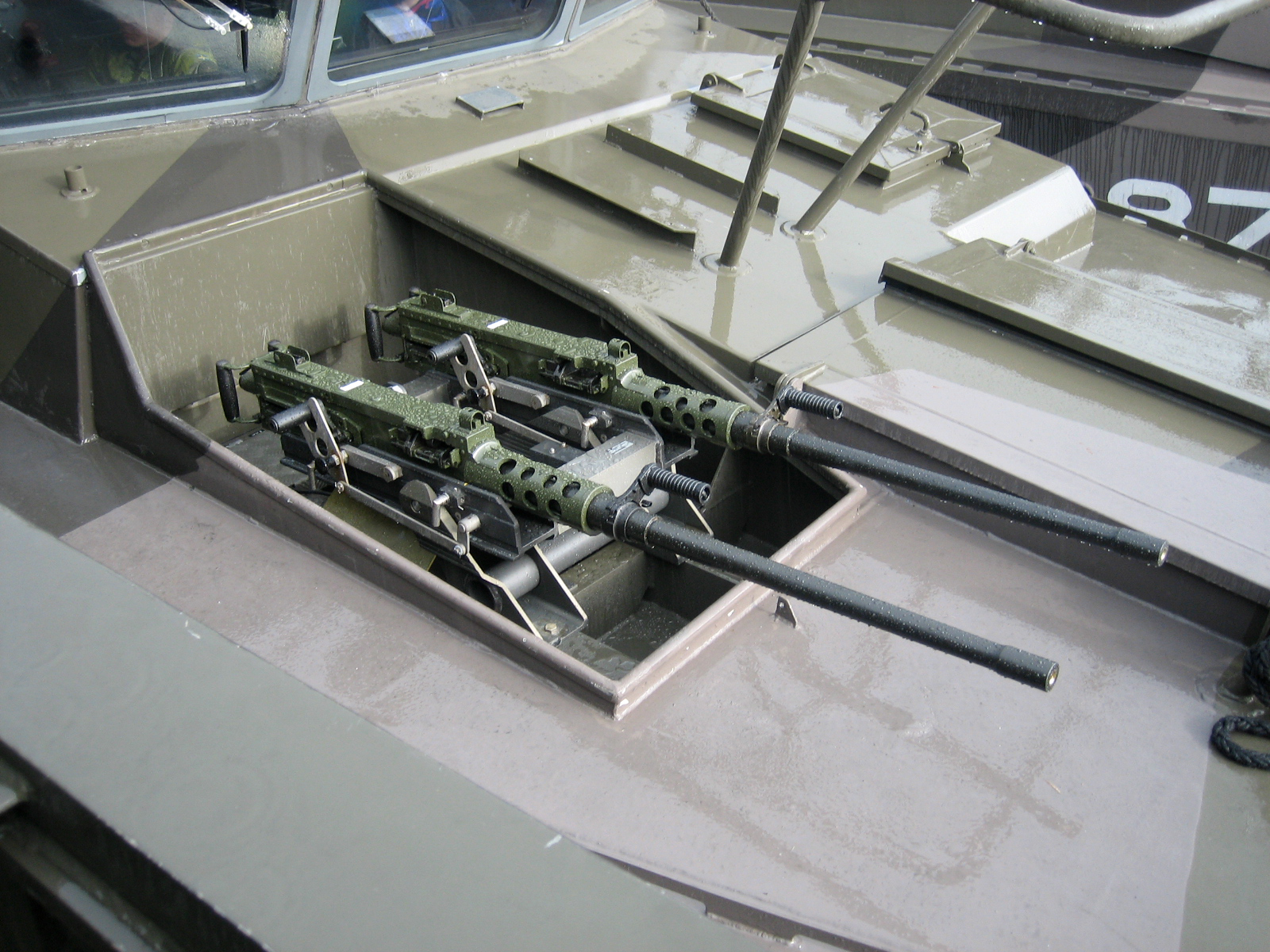
Two .50 cal heavy machine guns seen here in front of the helmsman's position

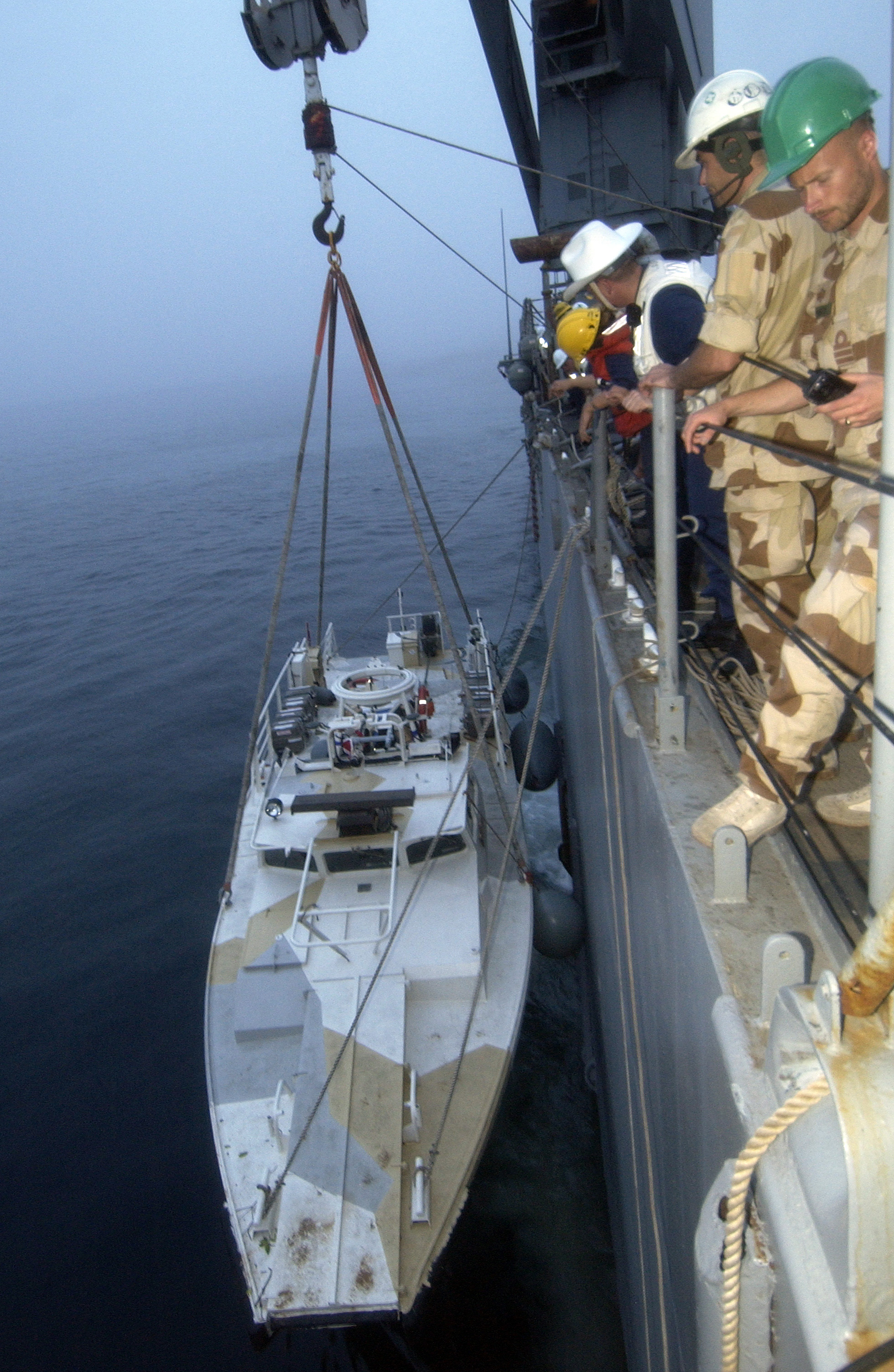
Royal Norwegian Navy S90N

=== Swedish version ===
==== Strb 90 H ====
Several Strb 90 H have been converted by the Swedish Navy to fill various roles:

- The Strb 90 L is outfitted for battalion-level command and control, with computer and communications equipment and an auxiliary generator to provide electrical power when the engines are not running. The L stands for ledning (command or leadership).
- The Strb 90 KompL is a plain Strb 90 H in which portable computer and communications equipment have been installed, allowing it to temporarily provide company-level command and control. Electrical power is provided by a rather loud portable generator installed on the deck.
- At least one Strb 90 H, pennant number 802, is equipped with a decompression chamber.
- The Swedish Police operate one unarmed Strb 90 H equipped with bunks, a pantry and a crew lounge.
- The Swedish Sea Rescue Society operates two unarmed Strb 90 Hs converted for search and rescue.

==== Strb 90 HS ====
The Strb 90 HS is designed for overseas peacekeeping and rescue operations. It is modified to keep its crew comfortable in Mediterranean conditions, with air conditioning, an auxiliary generator, a head, and more comfortable crew stations. More importantly, it is armoured, and its engines have been upgraded to compensate for the added weight.

==== Saab CB90 NG / Strb 90 HSM ====
The Saab CB90 NG, known as the Strb 90 HSM in the Swedish Navy, was delivered to the FMV in October 2019. It has an improved speed and manoeuvrability, and has improved offensive capabilities with the Saab Trackfire remote weapon system, and also improved surveillance capabilities.

==== Saab CB90 CX ====
In November 2026, Saab presented the CB90 CX (Capability X), and announced that it was in production for Sweden. It is optionally manned. It is equipped with the Saab Autonomous Ocean Core system. It exists in multiple variants:

- ISR: equipped with the Giraffe 1X radar on a mast with a range of up to 100 km. The radar is operable from its lowest position (4 meters) to its highest position (11 meters). It is armed with the Saab Trackfire weapons station.
- Anti-ship: equipped with a Marte ER anti-ship missile with a 100 km range.
- SHORAD: equipped with the Rheinmetall’s Seasnake 30 naval gun (Oerlikon KCE gun, 30×173mm calibre), and also equipped with loitering ammunition.

=== Norwegian version ===
The Royal Norwegian Navy operates 20 CB90s under the designation SB90N; the N stands for Norsk utgave (Norwegian version). The S90N differs from the Strb 90 H in a few areas:

- It is armed with two M2 Browning heavy machine guns (port and starboard), and a Protector remote weapon station.
- The anchor winch is motorized, and the anchor is mounted at the stern, allowing a grounded S90N to tow itself afloat rather than risk damage to its impellers.
- It carries an auxiliary generator that provides electrical power to navigation and communications systems even when the engines are not running.
- The troop compartment has a higher deck height, making it possible for most people to stand without crouching.
- It has two water-tight compartments in the bow, having an extra room for toilets and stores.
- It has much more sophisticated navigation equipment based on GPS technology delivered by Kongsberg Seatex AS.

At least one S90N has been reconfigured into a floating ambulance.

In 2004, the Royal Norwegian Navy conducted tests (including a live fire exercise) to evaluate the effectiveness of the SB90N as an aiming and launching platform for the Hellfire missile. One SB90N was equipped with a stabilized Hellfire launcher based on the Protector, and its machine gun was replaced with a gimbal-mounted sensor package containing visible-light and infrared cameras and a laser designator. Although the tests were successful, there is currently no indication that the Royal Norwegian Navy will deploy SB90Ns armed with Hellfire missiles in regular service. The Hellfire can still be carried on the boats without launching platforms and be fired from shore with the Portable Ground Launch System.

The CB90s are used by the Coastal Ranger Commando.

=== Greek version ===
- Hellenic Coast Guard also operates since 1998 three CB90 under the CB90HCG designation which is a slightly different version of the Norwegian Navy version.

== Incidents and accidents involving CB90s ==
In mid-1999, one CB90 (No. 820) belonging to the Swedish Karlskrona Coastal Artillery Regiment (KA2) crashed into a concrete pier at approximately 30 knots (56 km/h). There were eight soldiers on board; seven of them sustained more or less severe injuries, including fractures, while one soldier who was standing in the machine gun ring mount on mid-deck remained physically unhurt.

On 25 April 2003, Stridsbåt 90H nr 881 grounded 30 meter onto the Brorn island, causing significant damage to the vessel, and slightly injuring 3 soldiers.

On June 13, 2004, several Strb 90 H from the Swedish First Marine Regiment (AMF1) were sailing at high speed in convoy formation when one of them abruptly reduced speed (allegedly so its wake would not upset a smaller sailboat). The boat immediately behind it failed to react and rammed it. Two soldiers who were above deck at the time of the accident were hit and thrown into the water; both were killed almost instantly.

On the night of October 23, 2006, a CB90 sank off of Hamnudden, east of Utö in the Stockholm archipelago. The boat was travelling at 11 knots (20 km/h) due to the bad weather when it suddenly began to take on water from the bow. It then sank in less than ten minutes. All of the crew of 16 were quickly picked up by other ships that were nearby. No one was physically injured, but the crew suffered from shock and hypothermia when picked up.

On October 5, 2014, a Royal Malaysian Navy CB90 bearing registration number CB204 was reported lost at sea due to storms and high tides. There were seven crewmen on board. The boat was last detected at 1.05 pm some 57 nautical miles off Labuan Island. The boat was found on October 6 near Station Lima, after its distress call was heard by KD Paus, a Jerung-class gunboat, with no injuries to all 7 crew. It was reportedly caused by engine and steering problems.

On January 12, 2016, two U.S. Navy riverine command boats were "taken into custody" by Iran's Revolutionary Guards' Navy near Farsi island in Persian Gulf. An Iranian state-run news outlet reported that 10 U.S. sailors had been "arrested" even though Iranian and U.S. officials said that none of the sailors were harmed and that they would be released promptly. Officials have stated that one of the boats broke down very close to Iranian territorial waters and after drifting for a short time both were picked up by Iranian forces. According to Stars and Stripes newspaper, the crews were released a short time later.

On 25 February 2025, a Strb 90 H crashed at high speed on a rock in the Göteborg archipelago, causing 4 injuries on board.

== Operators ==
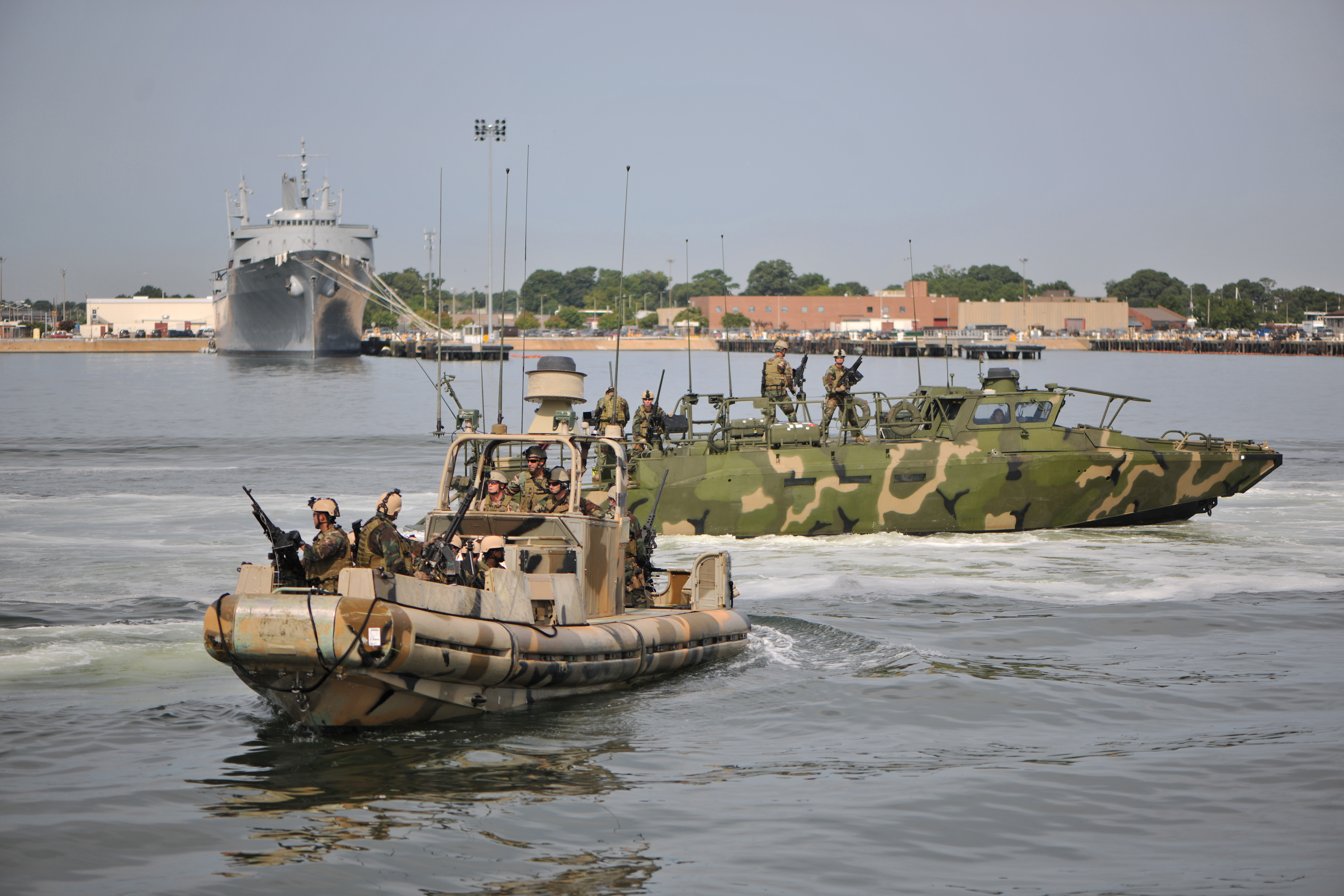
US Navy Riverine Squadron small unit riverine craft (left) and a Riverine Command Boat (right), 2011

=== Current operators ===
Greece (3)
Hellenic Coast Guard: 3 CB90HEX delivered in 1998 are operated between Corfu and Albania.
Pennant numbers: ΠΛΣ-134, ΠΛΣ-135, ΠΛΣ-136
Malaysia (17)
Malaysian Navy: a fleet of 17 CB90 RMN was delivered between 1996 and 2002:
- 5 CB90 H: 5 delivered in 1996 and 1999
- 1 CB90 H/VIP: 1 delivered in 2002
- 12 CB90 HEX delivered between 2000 and 2001
Mexico (48)
Mexican Navy: 48 CB90 HMN purchased to combat drug trafficking in the Caribbean Sea:
- 40 CB90 HMN delivered between 1999 and 2000
- 8 CB90 HMN delivered between 2003 and 2005, made under licence at ASTIMAR No 3, Coatzacoalcos.
Norway (20)
Royal Norwegian Navy: the CB90N was modified to have a raised superstructure, providing a standing height of 2 meters in the troop compartment. It is among others used to transport the Hellfire coastal defence system provided by Bofors and Boeing.
- 4 CB90 N supplied in 1996
- 16 CB90 N supplied between 1997 and 1999
Poland (-)
The CB90 HSM was presented by Poland in April 2026, in an exercise including the special forces Formoza unit of the Polish Navy.
The variant is equipped with the Saab Trackfire remote weapon station that is capable of anti-drone missions.
Sweden (120)
Royal Swedish Navy:
- CB90 H: 75 purchased, 32 transferred to Ukraine. (Note: Ships purchased: 12 Stridsbåt 90H Series 1; 63 Stridsbåt 90H Series 2; Donations: 32 Stridsbåt 90H donated in total to Ukraine as part of a support package of January 2025: 10 pledged in February 2024; 6 pledged in September 2024; 16 pledged in January 2025)
- CB90 HS: 27 purchased, a variant with additional CBRN protection.
- CB90 HSM: 50 ordered (18 delivered between 2019 and 2022, 10 ordered as of November 2024 to compensate the aid to Ukraine, 22 more ordered during the Q2 of 2025).
- 8 Rheinmetall Sea Snake 30 ordered by the FMV in 2026 for the CB90 CX SHORAD variant.
Ukraine (32 second-hand)
Ukrainian Navy: Sweden pledged to donate 32 boats, 19 have already been delivered.
United States (7 built)
US Navy: known as "Riverine command boat" in the Navy:
- 1 CB90 H prototype with the pennant number RCB-X was built under licence in the USA by Safe Boats International.
- 6 CB90 H (RCB-1 to RCB-6) delivered between 2008 and 2010 were supplied to the Navy.

=== Future operators ===
Peru
Marina de Guerra del Perú:
Two CB90 HSM were ordered in June 2020, and two others later on. A first phase of the programme focused on the local assembly of the first four boats.
Saab signed a contract in December 2024 with SIMA Peru to assemble the CB90. The Navy acquires the boat to combat illicit maritime activities along the coasts and in the rivers.
The goal initially stated was to purchase 24 boats.

=== Potential operators ===
France
3 CB90 were loaned to the French Navy by Sweden in 2025 for testing and evaluation during an 18-month period.
Canada
Sweden is lending two CB90 to the Canadian Armed Forces. The forces were trained by the Amf 4 (fourth Amphibious Battalion in Gothenburg) during the summer of 2026. The vessel likely fits the Canadian requirements.
Germany (15)
The German Navy has been examining procurement of the CB90 since 2023. Up to 15 units are to be procured which will be used for port protection tasks and patrols.
A possible competitor is the Watercat M 18 AMC from Finnish manufacturer Marine Alutech. In September 2026, information show that the German Navy might lean towards the Finnish offer.
Greece
The Hellenic Army has shown interest in the purchase of a small number of CB90.
Hungary
The Hungarian Defence Forces has reformed its River Guard in 2023, it is known as the Danube Flotilla.
The CB90 is considered as a potential acquisition to reinforce their capabilities.

=== Evaluation only operators ===
Philippines
Philippine Navy: At least 1 CB90H evaluated and tested in 2002 around Manila Bay.
United Kingdom
Royal Navy: 4 CB90 were leased from the Royal Swedish Navy in 2011 to evaluate the option of potential acquisition. The boats were later returned to the Swedish Navy.

== Related development ==
- Storebro SB90E
- Combat Boat 2010

== See also ==
- G class landing craft
- Uisko class landing craft
- Jurmo class landing craft
- Jehu-class landing craft
- KMC Komando
- Multipurpose Assault Craft
- Project 03160 "Raptor" High-Speed Patrol Boat
- Cotecmar LPR-40
- Centaur-class fast assault craft
- Mark V Special Operations Craft
