= HDMS Absalon (F341) =

Frigate of the Royal Danish Navy

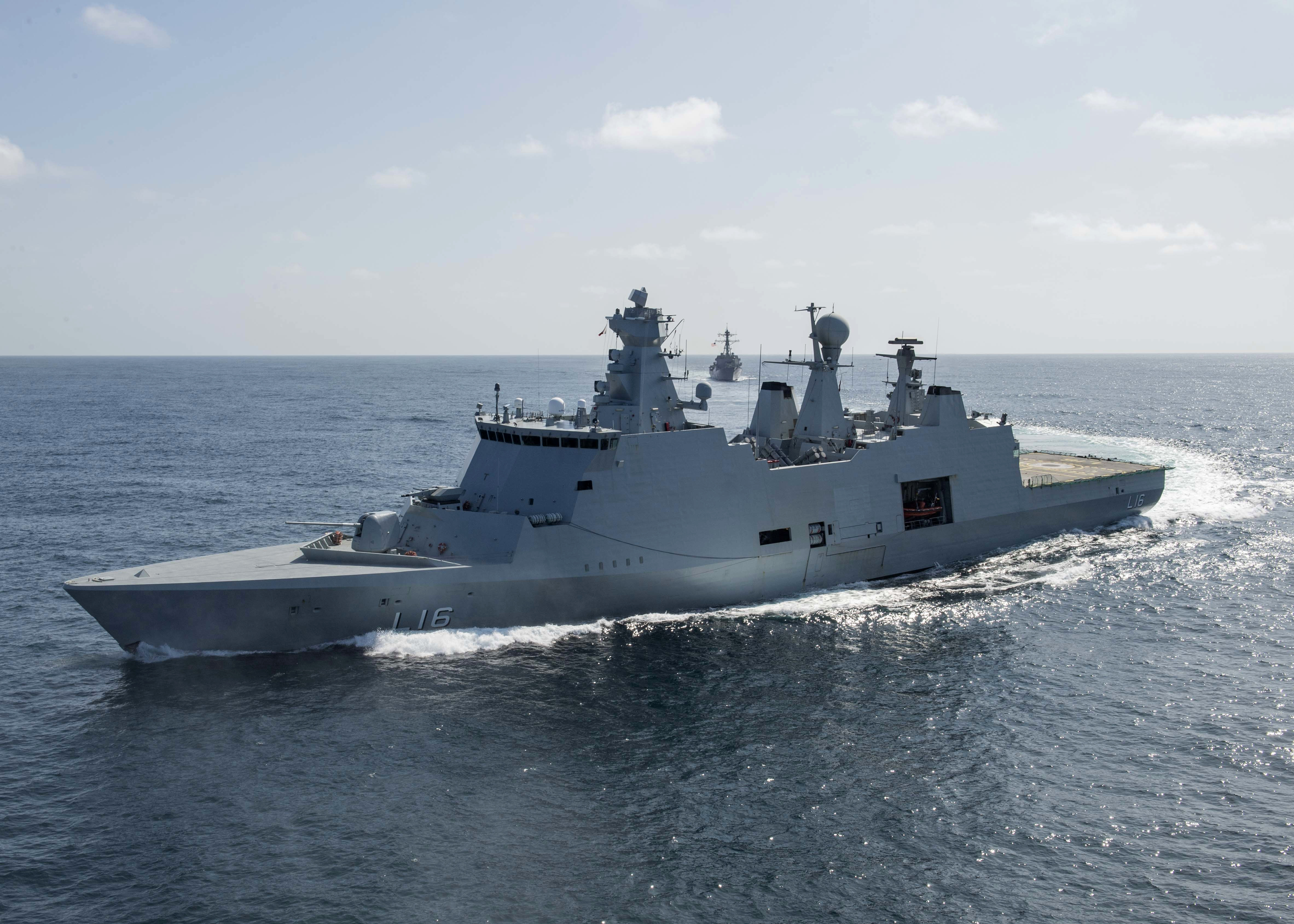
- Absalon in 2019

History

Denmark
- Name: Absalon
- Namesake: Absalon
- Ordered: November 2001
- Builder: Odense Staalskibsværft
- Laid down: 28 November 2003
- Launched: 25 February 2004
- Completed: 1 July 2004
- Commissioned: 19 October 2004
- Home port: Frederikshavn
- Identification: Call sign OUFA; IMO number: 9284441; MMSI number: 220189000
- Status: In active service

General characteristics
- Class & type: Frigate
- Displacement: 6,300 tonnes
- Length: 137.6 m (451 ft 5 in)
- Beam: 19.5 m (64 ft 0 in)
- Draft: 6.3 m (20 ft 8 in)
- Propulsion: 2 × MTU 8000 M70 diesel engines; Two shafts; 22,300 bhp (16.6 MW)
- Speed: 24 knots (44 km/h)
- Range: 9,000 nmi (17,000 km) at 15 kn (28 km/h)
- Boats & landing craft carried: 2 × SB90E LCP; 2 × RHIBs
- Complement: 169
- Sensors & processing systems: Thales SMART-S Mk2 3D volume search radar; Terma Scanter 6002 surface search and helo radar; Atlas ASO 94 sonar; 4 Saab CEROS 200 fire control radars; ES-3701 Tactical Radar Electronic Support Measures (ESM)
- Electronic warfare & decoys: 4 × 12-barrelled Terma DL-12T 130 mm decoy launchers; 2 × 6-barrelled Terma DL-6T 130 mm decoy launchers; Seagnat Mark 36 SRBOC
- Armament: 1 × 5 inch (127 mm)/54 Mark 45 mod 4 gun; 7 × 12.7 mm heavy machine gun; 3 × VLS with up to 36 RIM-162 ESSM/RIM-7 Sea Sparrow (Mk 56/Mk 48 VLS); 8-16 × Harpoon Block II SSM; 2 × Oerlikon Millennium 35 mm Naval Revolver Gun Systems CIWS; MU90 Impact ASW torpedoes; 4 × Stinger Point-defence SAM
- Aircraft carried: 2 × EH-101 or 2 × Westland Lynx
- Aviation facilities: Aft helicopter deck and hangars

HDMS Absalon (F341) and her sister ship Esbern Snare of the Royal Danish Navy (RDN) are the two members of the Absalon class. The lead ship of the class is named after Danish archbishop and statesman Absalon and received full operational status in 2007. Originally named with the pennant number L16, the ship was reclassified from a "flexible support ships" to an ASW frigate in October, 2020.

== Design ==
The ships are the first in a series of RDN vessels tasked with carrying out new types of missions, and are to form the backbone of the international operations that the RDN is increasingly focusing on.

The Absalon-class ships are primarily designed for command and support roles, with a large ro-ro deck, but with their many offensive weapons and new anti-submarine weapons and tasks, the class was changed to frigates in 2020.

The three frigates of the succeeding Iver Huitfeldt class are similar to the Absalon-class vessels but without the large ro-ro deck.

Absalon is one of a number of vessels to have been filmed by documentary makers to appear on the Mighty Ships TV programme, detailing the capabilities and stories of the ship and crew.

== Service ==
=== Somali counter-piracy mission ===
Starting in 2008, HDMS Absalon participated in the UN-led counter-piracy mission off Somalia and the east coast of Africa, acting as flagship to the Danish Task Group which led Task Force 150. In September 2008, as part of the task force, Absalon was involved in the capture of 10 pirates, who were eventually set free. On 3 December 2008, after the mandate had been extended, Absalon rescued a disabled skiff with suspected pirates aboard in the Gulf of Aden, 90 miles off the coast of Yemen; the Somali craft was reported to hold rocket-propelled grenades and AK-47 assault rifles, and to have been adrift for several days. Absalon took the sailors and weapons aboard, sank the craft, and turned the sailors over to the Yemeni Coast Guard. Absalon was reportedly the most successful counter-piracy warship in the Gulf of Aden, capturing 88 out of the 250 pirates detained.

On 16 March 2009, Absalon, along with the Turkish frigate TCG Giresun, successfully prevented pirates from capturing the Vietnamese cargo ship MV Diamond Falcon. Absalon's counter-piracy mission with NATO Task Force 150 in Somali waters ended 1 April 2009, after resulting in the capture of over 80 pirates, some of whom were transferred to the Netherlands for trial.

On 5 February 2010, Absalon helped to rescue the crew of the Antigua and Barbuda-flagged merchant vessel Ariella, which was being hijacked by six armed pirates. Absalon dispatched a helicopter and a special forces team, deterring the pirates. On 1 March 2010, Absalon was reported to have sunk a Somali pirate mother ship carrying several pirate speedboats in the Indian Ocean.

On 7 January 2012, Absalon intercepted and boarded a Somali pirate mother ship in the Indian Ocean. The boarding crew freed 14 Iranian and Pakistani fishermen who had been held as hostages for over two months.

On 30 November 2015, Minister of Defence Peter Christensen, announced that Absalon was to be moved to the Mediterranean Sea, in order to accommodate Turkey's request to NATO, for a larger military presence in the area.

From 7 May to 13 May 2022, Absalon took part in Exercise Mjolner 2022 held in the Arctic region.
