= Absalon-class frigate =

Danish multipurpose frigate

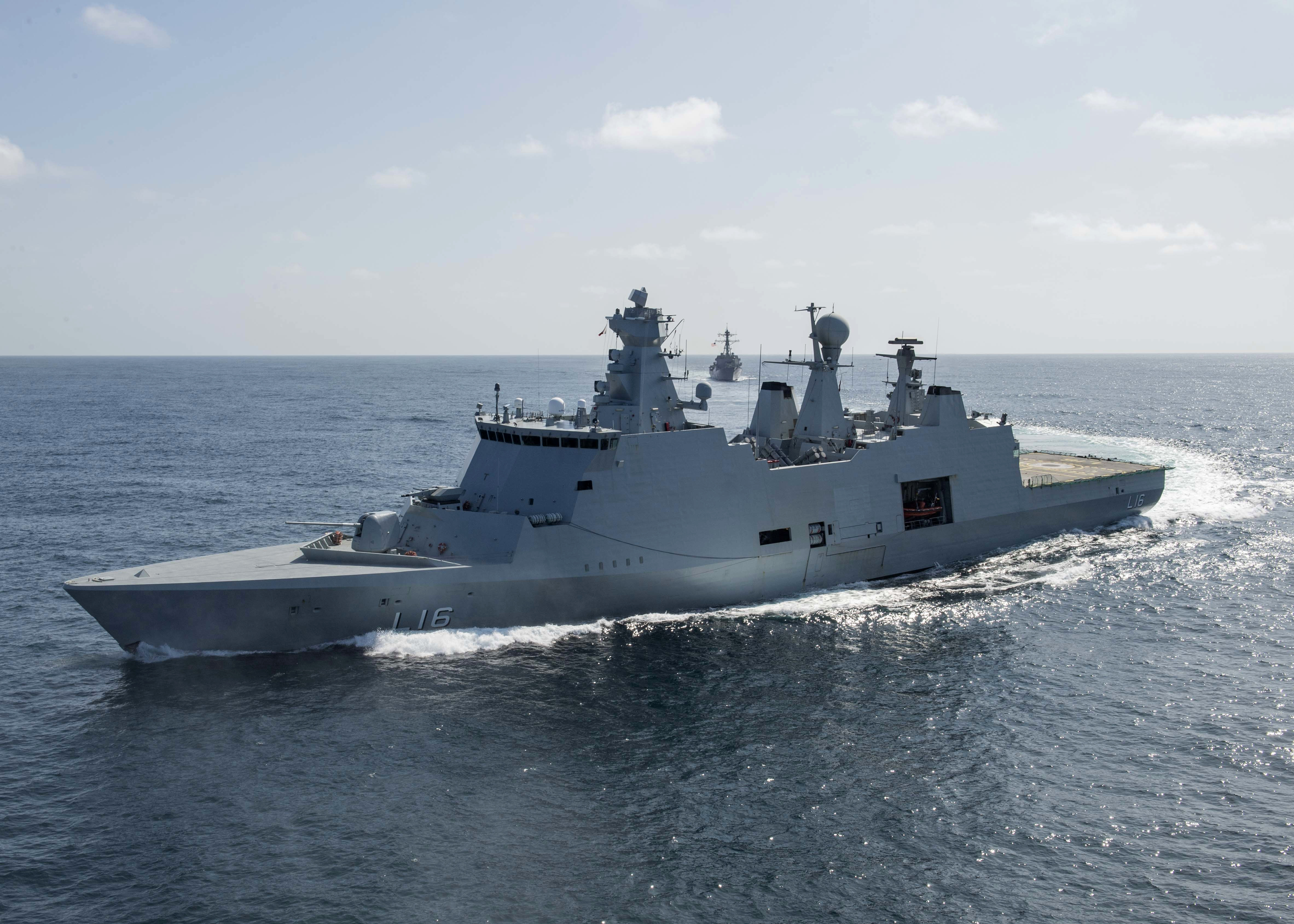
- Absalon in 2019

Class overview
- Builders: Odense Staalskibsværft
- Operators: Royal Danish Navy
- Preceded by: Falster class
- Cost: DKK2.5bn (total), (~US$189m/ship) excluding weapon modules
- Built: 2003–2004
- In commission: 2005–present
- Completed: 2
- Active: 2

General characteristics
- Type: Frigates (formerly support ships)
- Displacement: 4,500 tonnes light, 6,600 tonnes full load
- Length: 137 m (449 ft 6 in)
- Beam: 19.5 m (64 ft 0 in)
- Draft: 6.3 m (20 ft 8 in)
- Propulsion: CODAD (Combined diesel and diesel): 2 × 2 MTU 20V 8000 M70 with a combine output of 32.8 MW (44,000 shp), with 2 shafts, and each a controllable-pitch propeller; 1 × bow thruster
- Speed: 24 knots (44 km/h)
- Range: 9,000 nmi (17,000 km) at 15 kn (28 km/h)
- Boats & landing craft carried: 2 × SRC-90E special forces insertion craft; 2 × RHIB
- Complement: 100, plus aircrew and transients (accommodation for up to 300 in total)
- Sensors & processing systems: Systems; Combat management system: Terma C-Flex C4I (Combat management, command, control, communications and intelligence system); 20 × Mearsk Data Defence system multi-function consoles; Radars and electro-optical sensors: 1 × Thales Nederland SMART-S Mk2, S-band (IEEE) PESA, 3D, medium to long-range air and surface surveillance and guidance radar with an IFF system integrated; 4 × Saab CEROS 200 Mk 3 fire control directors (radar and EOS); 1 × Scanter 2001 X-band (IEEE) surface surveillance radar; 2 × FR-2135 X-band (IEEE) civilian navigation radar; Sonars: 1 × Atlas Elektronik ASO 94-01 hull-mounted sonar; 1 × Atlas Elektronik ACTAS towed array sonar (2025 upgrade contract); Communications: Tactical data links: Link 11, Link 16 and Link 22; Satellite communications (civil / military) in EHF, SHF and UHF bands; Antenna stations for army / air force / special forces use
- Electronic warfare & decoys: EW systems: 1 × ES 3701 Tactical Radar Surveillance System and Electronic Support Measures (ESM); 2 × Terma DL12T (Terma Mk 137 130 mm decoy launchers); 2 × Terma DL6T (Terma Mk 137 130 mm decoy launchers); Seagnat Mark 36 SRBOC (decoy launchers)
- Armament: Permanently mounted weapons: MASS after upgrade; Missiles: 2 × 2 Sea Stinger platform (MANPAD); Torpedoes: 2 × dual MU90 Impact ASW torpedo launchers (launcher Mark 32 Mod 14); Cannons: 1 × Mk 45 gun Mod 4 (127 mm - L/62); 2 × CIWS Oerlikon Millennium Gun (GDM-008) with AHEAD ammunition (35×228mm); Small arms: 7 × M/01 LvSa HMG (12.7×99mm NATO); Modular armament: 5 × StanFlex modules positions, with the following weapons: Stanflex Mk-56 VLS with 12 × RIM-162 ESSM (Typical mission with 3 × Stanflex RIM-162 ESSM - 36 missiles); Stanflex 2 × 4 Mk141 Harpoon inclined launcher with 8 × Harpoon SSM Block II (Typical mission with 2 × Stanflex Harpoon - 16 missiles)
- Aircraft carried: Helicopters: 1 × MH-60R Seahawk, and / or; 1 × EH-101
- Aviation facilities: Aft helicopter hangar (for 2 helicopters); Aft flight deck

The Absalon class are frigates of the Royal Danish Navy, commissioned in 2005. The two ships in the class may be described as a hybrid between a frigate and military transport ship with multiple role capabilities, with the capacity to be transformed from a combat ship with the firepower of a traditional frigate to a hospital ship within a day.

== Design ==
The class is based on a frigate-like design, but built with an internal multipurpose deck (flex deck) and a stern vehicle ramp. The ships can serve as command platforms for a staff of 75 persons (naval or joint staff) with a containerized command and control center, transport and base of operations for a company-sized landing force of some 200 soldiers with vehicles. Alternatively, the flex deck can be used for mine-laying operations with a capacity of some 300 mines, or be fitted out for mine-clearing operations and launch and recover mine detecting and clearing equipment via a retractable gantry crane, adjacent to the stern vehicle ramp, which also is used for launching and recovering the fast landing craft. Furthermore, the flex deck can support a containerized hospital or simply transport a number of ISO standard containers or some 55 vehicles, including up to seven main battle tanks. The ships can carry two landing craft, personnel (LCPs) (Storebro SB90E), two rigid hull inflatable boats and two AW-101 helicopters.

The ships have been designed by a joint team from The Royal Danish Navy (RDN), the Danish Defence Acquisition and Logistics Organization (DALO) and a group of contractors, primarily Odense Maritime Technology (OMT) to the Royal Danish Navy's requirements for a multi-mission frigate-like ship with an emphasis on flexibility.

The ships are built to the naval standards of Det Norske Veritas (DNV GL), an international certification body and classification society, heavily utilizing STANAG.

The design is built with the aim of a large margin for growth over life-cycle, to a relatively low cost of ownership, with open architecture for ease of upgrades, with a high degree of automation allowing smaller crews, and utilizing StanFlex modules that can be shared across several ship classes in service with the Royal Danish Navy.

The hulls were built in highly competitive commercial shipyards using the latest development in the industries shipbuilding technology and cost-effective production procedures and processes. The outfitting and integration of sensor, communication and weapons systems was primarily carried out "in-house" by the RDN and DALO.

The standard weapons of the Absalon class can be supplemented through the use of StanFlex mission modules. A special weapons deck (nicknamed the 'Bathtub') is designed with five StanFlex module slots. Because of the Bathtub's position, only missile-firing weapons modules can be installed.

== History ==
The ships were named after two brothers, Esbern Snare and archbishop Absalon, who led the naval campaigns in the 12th century against the Wends, a group of pagan Slavs in northern Germany.

Production started at Odense Steel Shipyard on 30 April 2003, with the lead ship Absalon laid down on 28 November of that year. Esbern Snare followed on 24 March 2004; they were both launched later that year. They were delivered on 19 October 2004 and 17 April 2005 respectively, and commissioned on 10 January 2005 and 17 June 2005. At this point they had the StanFlex modules installed, but would have to wait until 2007 for full operational capability, with the installation of the 35mm CIWS, Mk32 torpedo launchers and Seagnat/SRBOC decoy systems. For political reasons, the ships were originally launched as "Flexible support ships" to avoid antagonising Russia after the end of the cold war.

Among other upgrades the two ships of the Absalon class were fitted with the newer Terma Scanter 6002 to replace the Scanter 2001 in 2020.

== Reclassification ==
On the 16th of October 2020, both ships were reclassed as anti-submarine warfare-frigates. Both ships will be upgraded with ATLAS ACTAS towed array sonars in addition to the existing, hull-mounted sonar. The Sikorsky SH-60 Seahawk helicopters will be equipped with dipping sonars, sonobuoys and torpedoes. This upgrade is expected to complete in 2026.

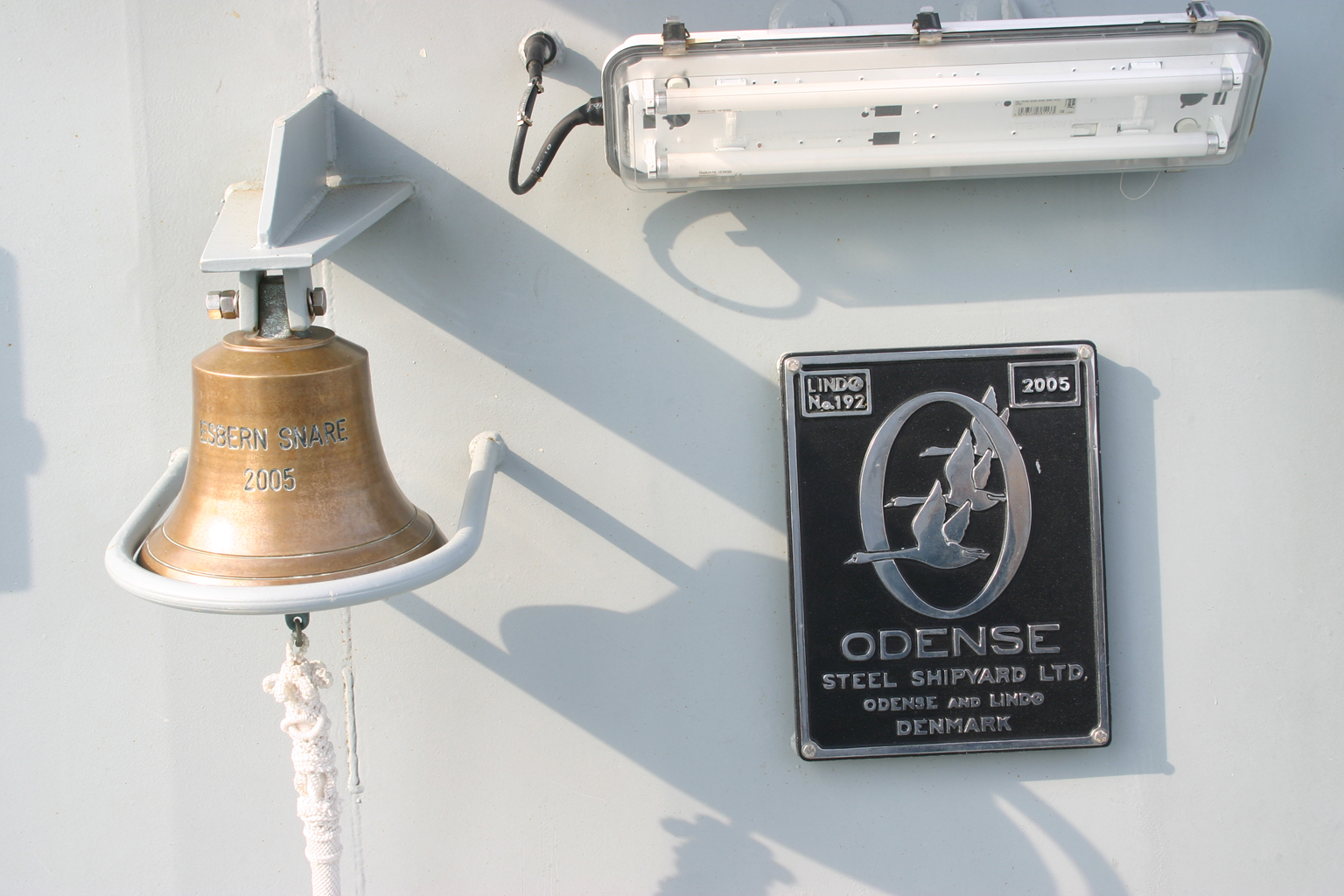
Ship's bell and Lindø Yard nameplate on board Esbern Snare (L17)

== List of ships ==
Name	Original Number	Number	Launched	Commissioned	Status
Absalon	L16	F341	25 February 2004	19 October 2004	Active
Esbern Snare	L17	F342	21 June 2004	18 April 2005	Active

== See also ==
- List of frigate classes in service

Equivalent frigates of the same era

- Fridtjof Nansen class
- Valour class
- Project 11356R
- Incheon class
- Formidable class
- Type 054
