= Storebro SB90E =

Motorboat developed for use by Swedish Navy

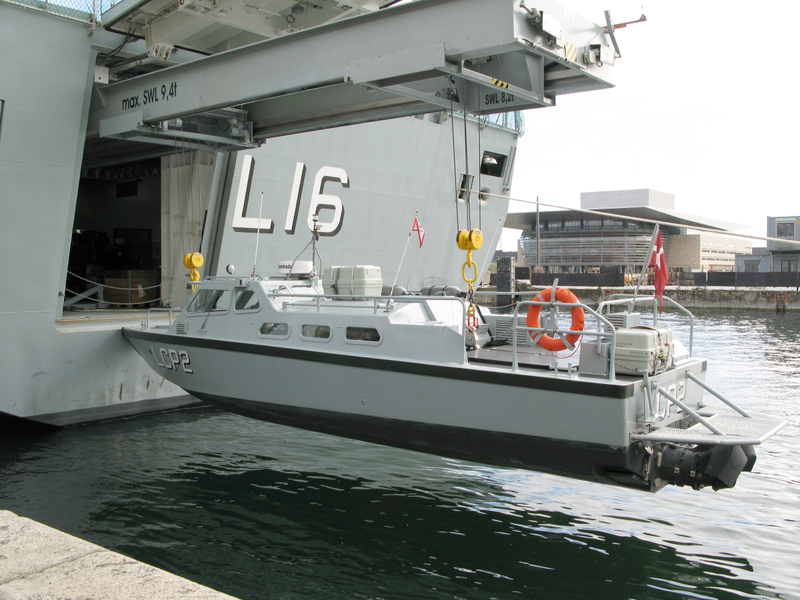
SB90E marked LCP2 in its hoist aboard HDMS Absalon

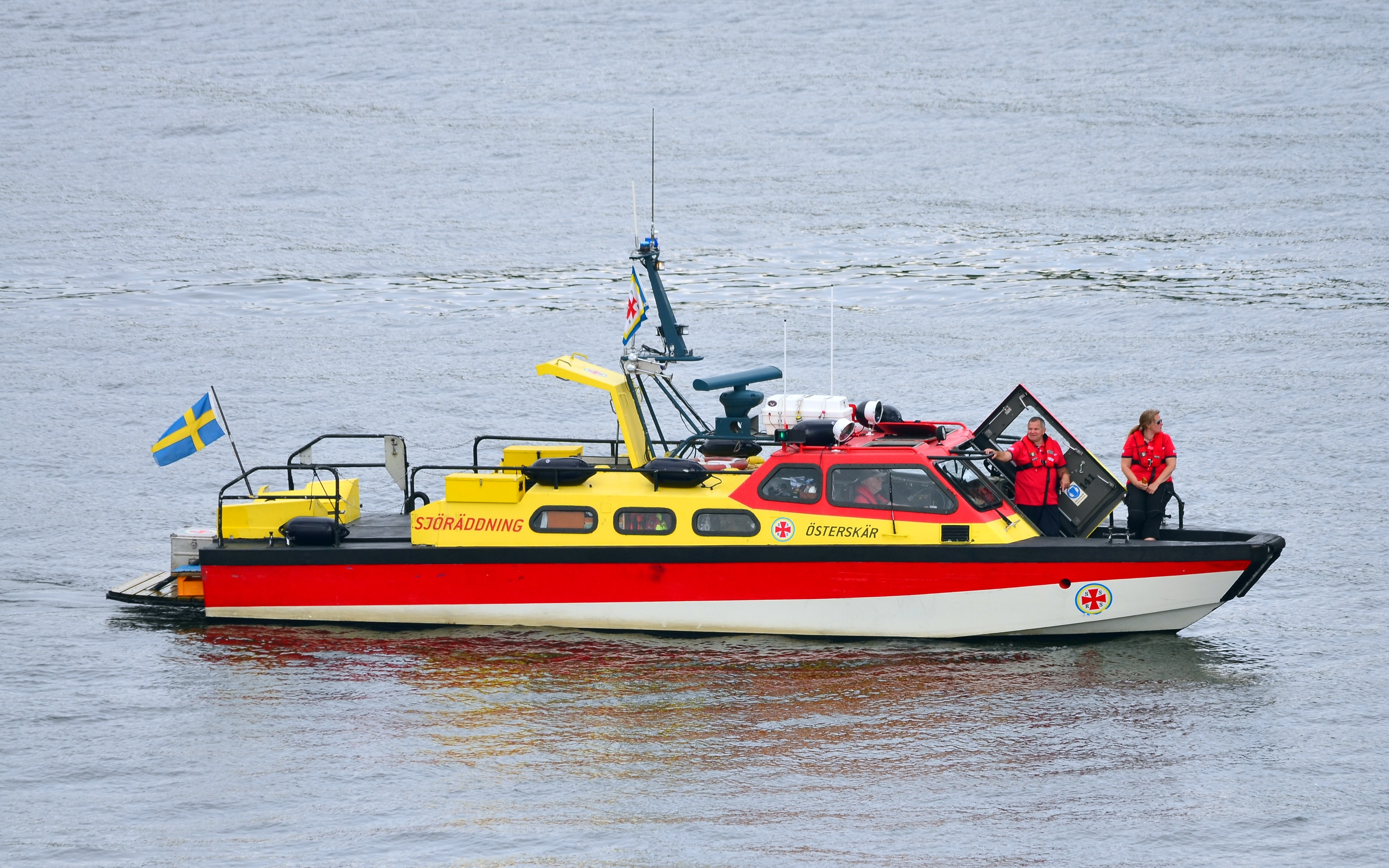
Rescue Österskär, stationed at the Stockholm Rescue Station, Sub-Station Åkersberga, an earlier Swedish Navy Patrolboat 90 E

The Storebro SB90E is a small craft developed by Swedish yacht designer Storebro Bruks AB. It was initially developed for the Swedish Navy, which designated it the Stridsbåt 90 E, the E being for Enkel (Swedish for "single" (referring to single engine), i.e. less elaborate, full-featured and capable than its bigger, twin engined, brother, Combat Boat 90) - shortened to Strb 90 E. It was later rebranded as the Storebro SRC90E (Note: Storebro uses both SRC90E and SRC 90E interchangeably) for international military export and it is now exclusively sold as SB90E for the civilian market. Their classification is YH, for ambulance boat.

== History ==
The SB90E was originally intended to be used as a medical evacuation vessel and simple insertion craft for the Swedish Amphibious Corps, with 60 ordered and 54 delivered; today only 5 remain in Swedish military service, with the rest being scrapped, sold off or in the case of 7 vessels, donated to the civilian Swedish Sea Rescue Society (Svenska Sjöräddningssällskapet).

One (formerly an ambulance boat from Oslo, Norway) is also in the private hands of British Entrepreneur Richard Noble for use as a pleasure craft.

In most cases the duties intended for the Strb 90 E have been taken over by the Strb 90 H.

== Operators ==
- Denmark
  - The Royal Danish Navy operates the SB90E in two variants:
  - 4 x LCP-vessels used aboard the Absalon class command ship, modified with a weapons-station
  - 2 x SAR-vessels used aboard the Knud Rasmussen class patrol vessel, modified with ice-reinforcement and upgraded engines
- Lithuania
- Norway
- People's Republic of China
- Sweden

== Specifications ==
- Length: 11.9 m
- Beam: 2.90 m
- Draft: 0.7 m
- Displacement: 7.2 t
- Range: Approx. 200 nm
- Max. speed: Approx. 42 knots

== See also ==
- CB90-class fast assault craft
