= Multipurpose Assault Craft =

Fast attack assault

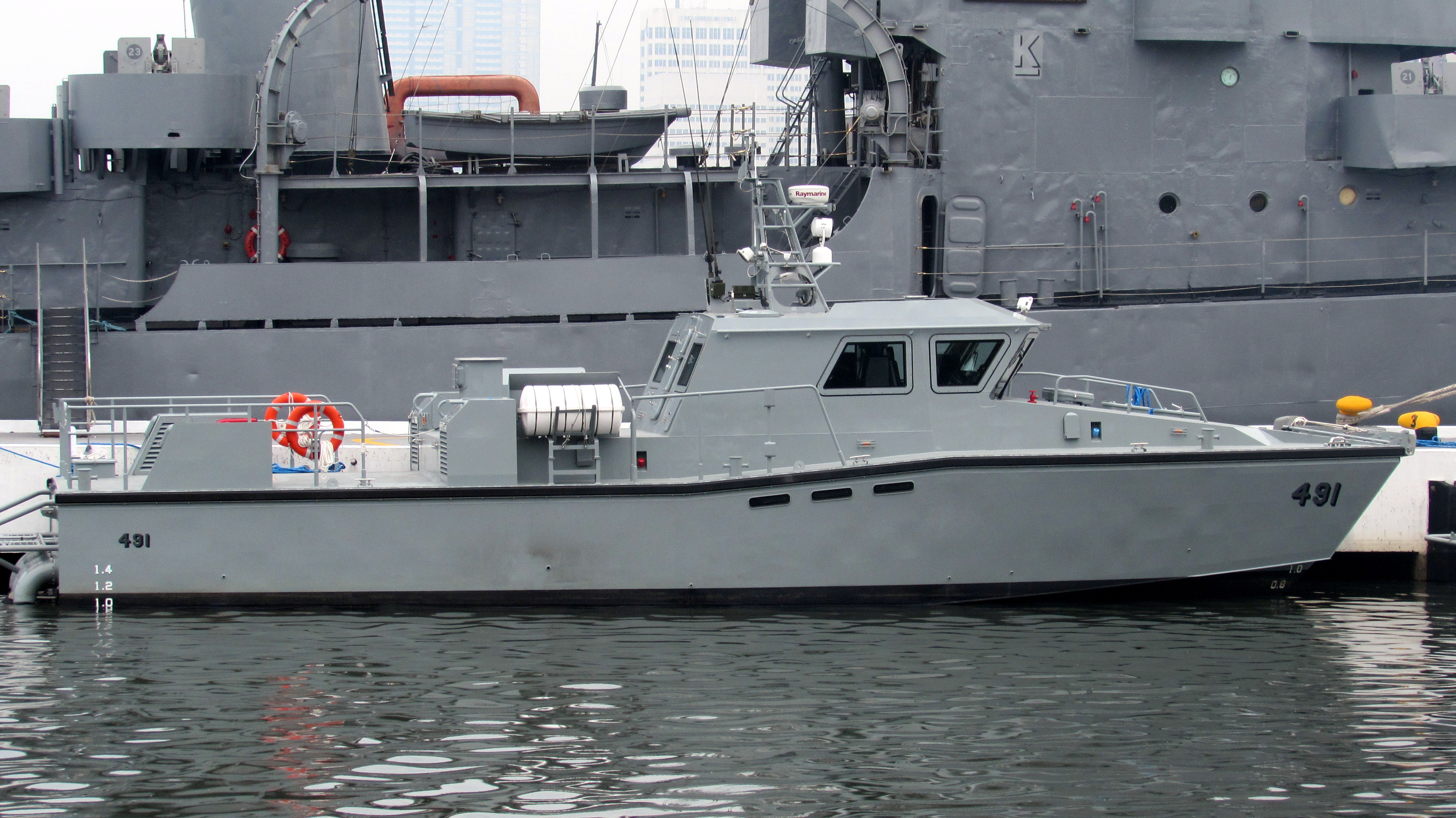
- A PN MPAC Mk3 craft docked on shore.

Class overview
- Name: MPAC (Multi-Purpose Assault/Attack Craft)
- Builders: Lung Teh Shipbuilding Co. Ltd.; Propmech Corp.
- Operators: Philippine Navy
- Subclasses: See Subclasses
- In commission: 2009–present
- Planned: 42
- Building: 0
- Completed: 12
- Active: 12

General characteristics
- Tonnage: Mk 3: 19 tonnes
- Length: Mk 1: 15 m; Mk 2: 17 m; Mk 3: 16.5–17 m
- Beam: 4.76 m
- Draft: Mk 1: 0.92 m; Mk 2: 0.90 m
- Depth: 2.1 m
- Propulsion: Water Jet
- Speed: Mk 1: 40 knots (74 km/h); Mk 2: 45 knots (83 km/h); Mk 3: 45–47 knots (83–87 km/h)
- Range: Mk 3: 350 nmi (650 km) at 30 knots (56 km/h)
- Troops: Mk 1: 16; Mk 2: 16; Mk 3: 8–10
- Complement: Mk 1: 5; Mk 2: 5; Mk 3: 7
- Armament: Mk.1 & Mk.2: 1 × Browning M2HB machine gun, 2 × 7.62 mm Machine Guns; Mk.3: 1 x Spike MLS ER Launcher, 1 × Mini-Typhoon Weapon Station, 2 x 7.62 mm Machine Guns

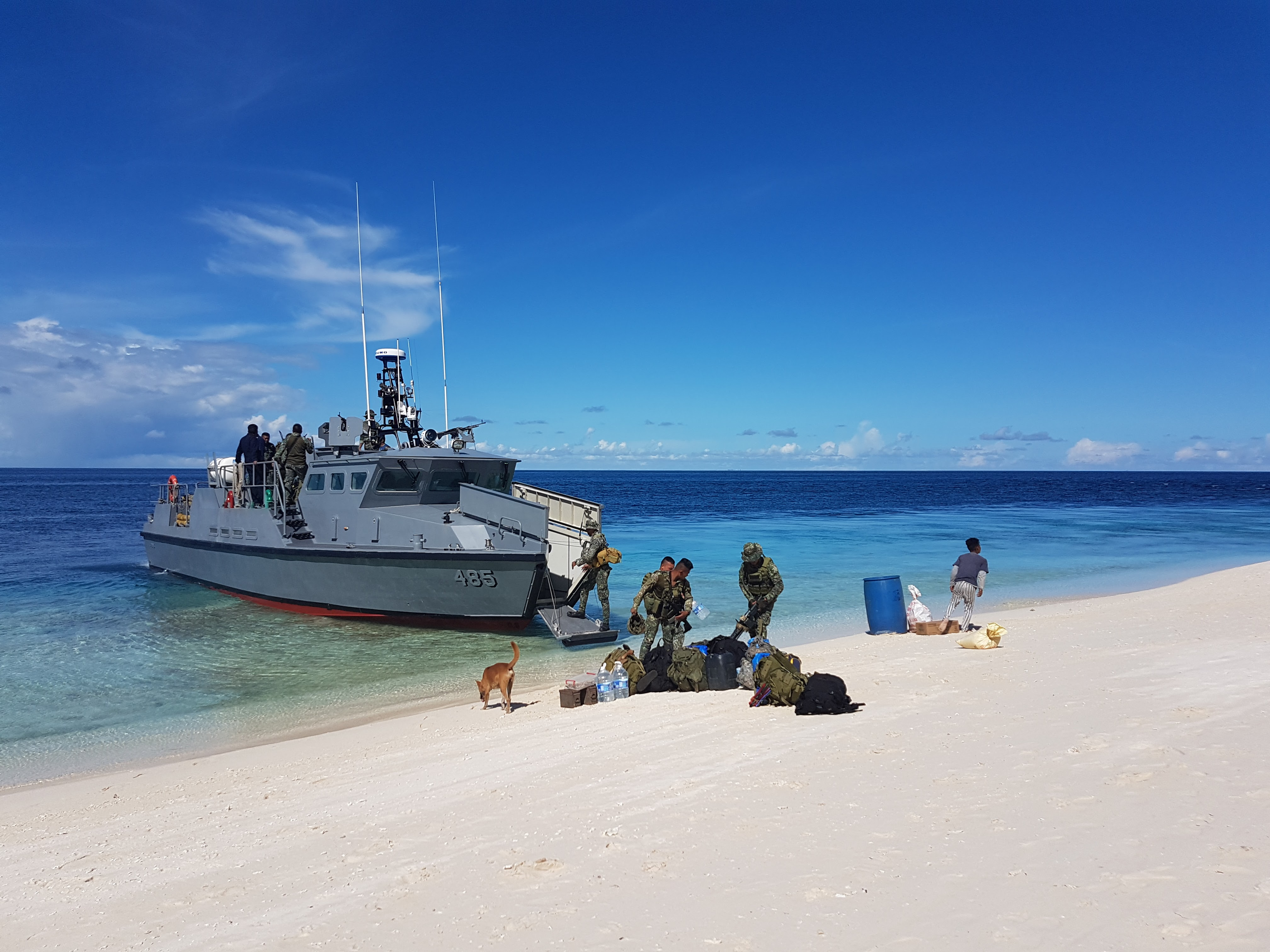
An MPAC Mk 2 making a beach landing on Panguan Island, Tawi-Tawi

The Multi-Purpose Assault Craft (MPAC) is a type of fast attack assault craft developed for the Philippine Navy. Originally designed to transport troops at a high speed and then land them on the beach, they have since expanded their roles to include interdiction, surface warfare, and search and rescue.

A total of 42 boats are planned to be built by the Navy of which 12 have been completed as of September 2019. The Mk 3 version of the MPAC are the first boats in the history of the Philippine Navy to be officially armed with missiles.

== Design ==
The MPAC's hull is made out of aluminum alloy and is powered by water jet engines. It has a range of 560 kilometres (350 mi), a maximum speed of 40–47 knots, and carries a crew of 5–7 plus 8–16 fully equipped soldiers.

The Mk 1 and Mk 2 can deploy an assault ramp at their bow while in later versions this feature was removed.

== Construction ==
In 2009, the Philippine Navy ordered the first batch of three ships from Taiwanese company Lung Teh Shipbuilding Co. Ltd. These first three ships were commissioned into service during the Philippine Navy's 111th Anniversary on May 22, 2009. These boats are designated the Mk 1 version.

In 2011, an additional three MPACs were built that were slightly bigger than the previous three ships. These ships this time were built by the Filipino company Propmech Corp. Designated as Mk 2. The first of these second batch of MPACs was commissioned into service during the Philippine Navy's 114th Anniversary on May 22, 2012. The next two ships were commissioned on August 6, 2012.

In 2016, Propmech was again contracted to build another three ships for US$1.86 million (PHP 90 million) each and delivery was set for April 2017. The ships, designated as Mk 3 versions, arrived without their armaments and were commissioned into service on May 22, 2017, as part of the Philippine Navy's Third Boat Attack Division of the Philippine Fleet's Littoral Combat Force. The armaments for the Mk 3 were initially set to be delivered by December 2017, but were only actually delivered in May 2018.

In September 2017, the Department of National Defense (DND) released a tender to procure an additional three MPAC vessels based on the Mk 3 platform which will be fourth batch. The budget is set at US$1.77 million (PHP 90 million) each for the hulls only, but these will be armed similarly as the Mk 3 version.

In May 2018, the DND revealed that they are studying a plan to arm the Mk 1 and Mk 2 versions of the MPAC with the same Spike ER missiles that are used on the Mk 3 version. However this plan was changed by February 2020 as the Philippine Navy announced that the Mk 1 and Mk 2 versions will instead be armed only with the Mini Typhoon remote weapon station. At the 2018 Kaohsiung International Maritime and Defence exhibition, it was revealed that the 4th batch would be the same design as the prior Mk. III version of the third batch.

The bidding for these boats underwent Post-Qualification (PQ) in July 2018 while construction started in November 2018. These were then delivered in August 2019 and commissioned into service the following month in September 2019.

This fourth batch has also been designated as part of the Mk 3 version and are scheduled to be armed with Spike-ER missiles by the last quarter of 2020.

== Operational history ==
=== 2010 ===
In May 2010, the MPACs first saw combat when they were used to extract Precinct Count Optical Scan (PCOS) machines in Basilan under heavy mortar fire from rogue Moro Islamic Liberation Front (MILF) rebels attempting to sabotage the election.

=== 2013 ===
In September 2013, the MPACs led the search and rescue operations for the passengers of the ill-fated MV St. Thomas Aquinas owned by the 2GO Shipping Company. It collided with M/V Sulpicio Express Siete in Cebu resulting in more than 100 casualties.

In the same month of September 2013 during the Zamboanga City Crisis, four MPACs were among those used to patrol the coastal villages of Zamboanga City and prevent the sympathizers of the Moro National Liberation Front (MNLF) in Basilan and Sulu from reinforcing their troops in Zamboanga.

=== 2015 ===
In September 2015, an MPAC participated in the 2015 PAGSISIKAP Fleet-Marine Amphibious Exercise in Ternate, Cavite by landing Philippine Marine Corps personnel into the beach.

=== 2016 ===
In March 2016, two MPACs of the Naval Forces Western Mindanao (NAVFORWESM) were used to intercept the M/L Fatima Radz-Auna off the coast of Arena Blanco, Zamboanga. The Radz-Auna was found with 1,500 5 kg sacks of smuggled Sugar with an estimated worth of PHP 3.15 million, and was immediately escorted to the Zamboanga Port and turned over to the Bureau of Customs.

=== 2017 ===
In December 2017, an MPAC Mk 2 (BA-485) was revealed to be assigned to guard the island province of Tawi-Tawi which lies near the Philippines' maritime border with Malaysia.

=== 2018 ===
In February 2018, two MPAC Mk 3 boats formed part of the 3rd Boat Attack Division under the operational control of the Joint Task Force - Malampaya of the Palawan-based Western Command (WesCom) where they will conduct patrol and rescue operations in the waters off Palawan, particularly around the Malampaya gas field area.

In April 2018, the MPAC Mk 2 (BA-485) participated in the interception of the Mongolian registered M/V Diamond 8 vessel near the Olutanga Island in the province of Zamboanga Sibugay which was later found to be attempting to smuggle Php 67 million worth of rice. The sailors of BA-485 were later given the Bronze Cross Medal for this accomplishment in May 2018.

In July 2018, the MPAC Mk 1 (BA-482) participated in the second leg of the 4th Combined Maritime Security Activity (MSA) with the Royal Australian Navy (RAN) in the waters around Tawi-Tawi along with the BRP Anastacio Cacayorin (PG-387) and BRP Felix Apolinario (PG-395) Patrol Crafts. The RAN sent the patrol vessels HMAS Ararat and Wollongong for the activity which consisted of meeting procedures, maritime patrols and ship drills.

In December 2018, an MPAC Mk 1 (BA-484) together with the BRP Waray (LC-288), BRP Agta (LC-290), BRP Juan Magluyan (PC-392), Philippine Marine Corps and Naval Special Operations Group units conducted an Amphibious Operation on Minis Island, Patikul, Sulu that resulted in the neutralization of seven Abu Sayyaf bandits, apprehension of 10 individuals and the recovery of several firearms and other war materials. The crew of BA-484 were later given the Military Merit Medal (Philippines) with Spearhead Device for their participation in the operation.

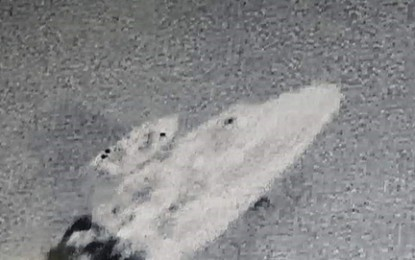
An MPAC Mk 3 intercepts a twin-engine speed boat used by Abu Sayyaf resulting in the death of 7 militants near Parang, Sulu. Photo taken from AgustaWestland AW109 helicopter of Philippine Air Force on November 3, 2020

=== 2020 ===
In April 2020, MPAC Mk 3 (BA-493) delivered relief goods for Patients Under Investigation (PUI) and Persons Under Monitoring (PUM) for the coronavirus pandemic in the remote Towns of Mapun and Turtle Islands in Tawi-Tawi.

In September 2020, MPAC Mk 3 (BA-492) spotted and rescued 4 Fishermen who were standing over their capsized Boat, the M/B Elsa 3 off the Coast of Zamboanga City.

On November 3, 2020, two MPAC Mk 3 (BA-491) and (BA-493) were involved in a high speed intercept of a boat carrying seven Abu Sayyaf terrorists off the coast of Parang, Sulu. The operation led to the killing of all seven terrorists. An AgustaWestland AW109 Light Attack Helicopter of the Philippine Air Force provided air support during the operation.

=== 2021 ===
In February 2021, the MPAC Mk 3 (BA-494) intercepted and caught the F/B Princess Arlyn off the coast of Sulu which was carrying 360 Cases of smuggled imported cigarettes worth Php 17.3 million on its way to Cotabato City from Indonesia.

In July 2021, the MPAC Mk 2 (BA-485) rescued 17 People from the Jungkung-type Boat named Friendly off the Coast of Patikul and Luuk in Sulu after it capsized due to big Waves and strong Winds from the bad Weather in the area.

In October 2021, the MPAC Mk 3 (BA-489) tested its Spike-ER Missile during the “Pagsisikap 2021” Naval Exercise off the Coast of Salkulakit Island in the Basilan Province. The Missile reportedly hit dead Center a Floating Target from a distance of 4 km. It is the second time the Spike-ER was launched from an MPAC, and the first time used in a Naval Exercise

In November 2021, MPAC Mk 2 (BA-485) with Government Troops onboard intercepted the M/B Francis Kane which was found with 203 cases of Cigarettes smuggled from Indonesia worth Php 7.4 million off the Coast of Kalingalan Caluang in Sulu.

=== 2022 ===
In early June 2022, the MPAC Mk 3 with Hull Numbers BA-492, BA-493 and BA-494 which comprises the 4th Boat Attack Division of the Littoral Combat Force (LCF) of the Philippine Navy arrived in its new Area of Assignment in Davao City as part of the Naval Forces Eastern Command (NFEM).

== Subclasses ==
- Mk 1:
  Original production version with total of three built by Lung Teh Shipbuilding Co.
- Mk 2:
  Second production version built by Propmech Corp. This version is 2 meters longer than the Mk 1 and can be differentiated by the shape of its pilot house and the positions of the machine guns.
- Mk 3:
  Removal of assault ramp, able to operate up to Sea State 5 and armed with Spike-ER missiles, a 12.7 mm machine gun on a Mini-Typhoon Weapon Station and two 7.62 mm machine guns. The Spike missiles and Mini-Typhoon RWS first became operational with the Mk 3 in August 2018.
- Mk 4:
  Similar to Mk 3.

== Ships in class ==
Hull number	Commissioned	Decommissioned	Status
Mk 1
BA-482	22 May 2009		Active
BA-483	22 May 2009		Active
BA-484	22 May 2009		Active
Mk 2
BA-485	22 May 2012		Active
BA-486	6 Aug 2012		Active
BA-487	6 Aug 2012		Active
Mk 3
BA-488	22 May 2017		Active
BA-489	22 May 2017		Active
BA-491	22 May 2017		Active
BA-492	23 Sep 2019		Active
BA-493	23 Sep 2019		Active
BA-494	23 Sep 2019		Active

== Gallery ==
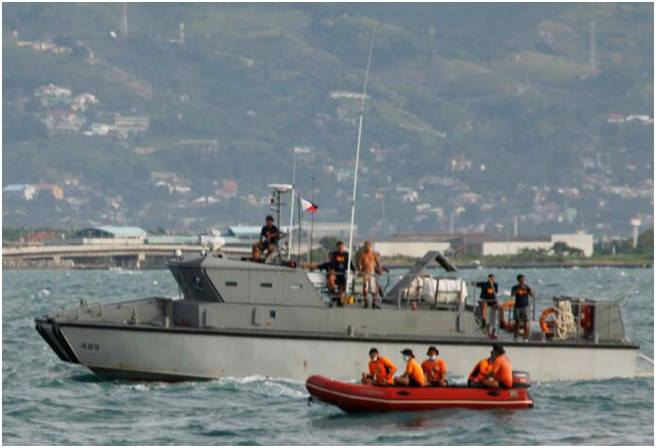
An MPAC Mk 1 designed to deploy up to 16 troops

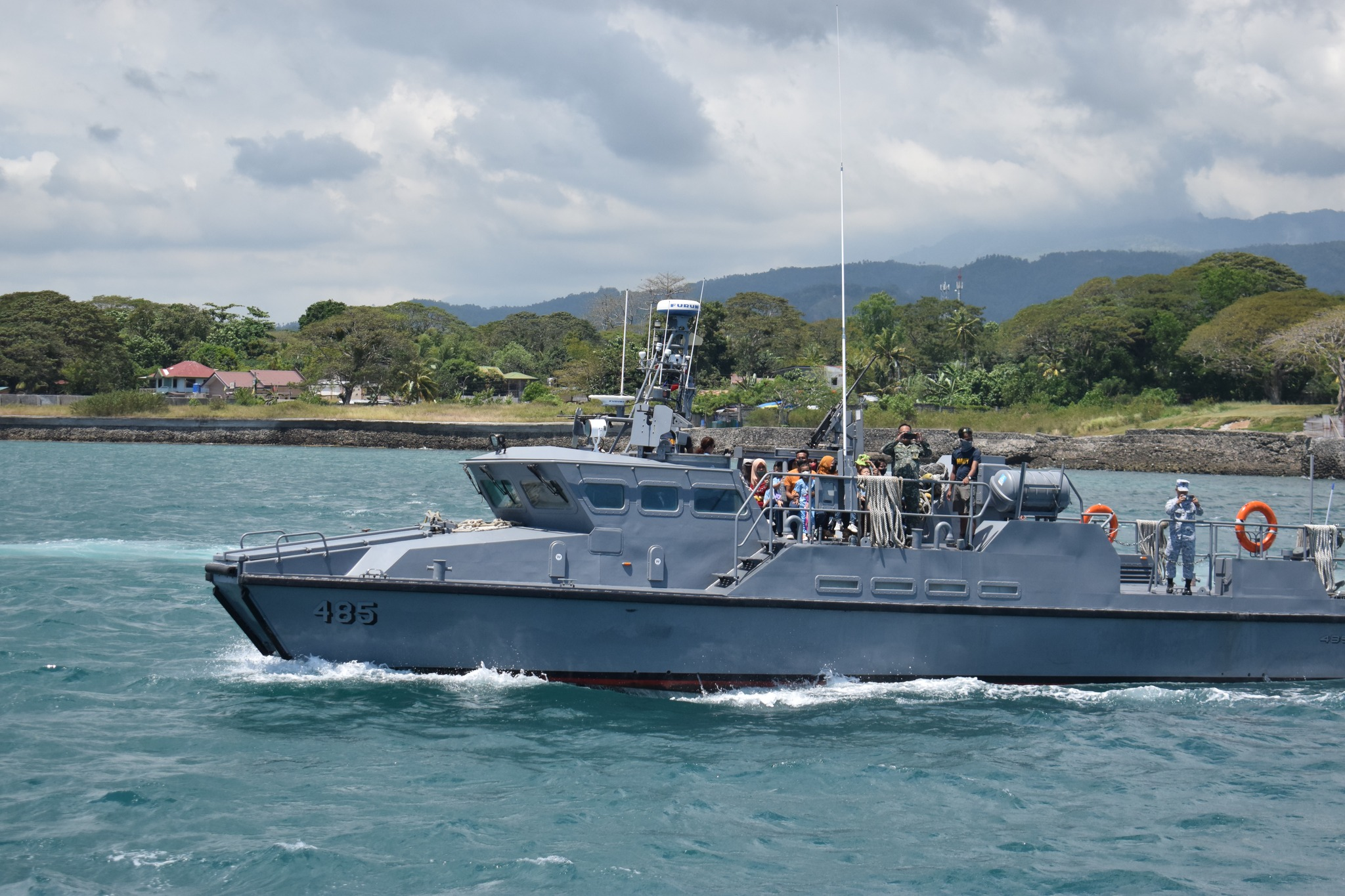
An MPAC Mk 2 deployed in Zamboanga

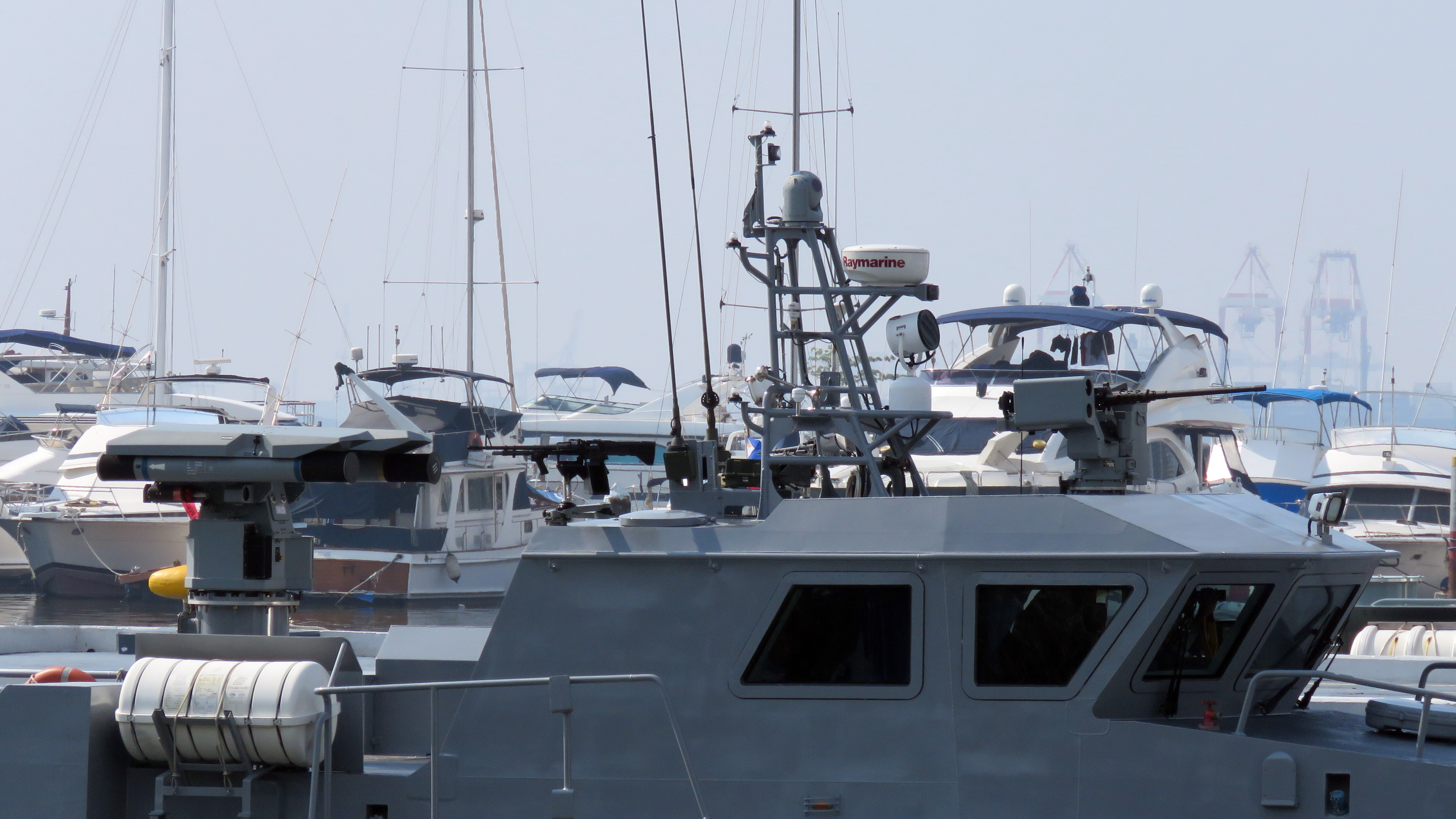
The Bridge and Spike MLS ER Missile Launcher of an MPAC Mk3

An MPAC Mk 3 maneuvering from the Pier

A quick walkthrough of an MPAC Mk 3 docked at the Naval Station Jose Andrada in Manila

== See also ==
- CB90, Swedish combat boat
- KMC Komando, Indonesian combat boat
- Raptor-class patrol boat, Russian combat boat
