= KMC Komando =

Combat boat

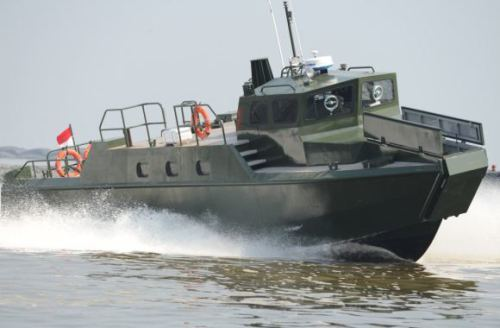
- KMC Komando of Kodam Wirabuana

Class overview
- Builders: Tesco Indomaritim
- Cost: Rp12 billion (2014) or US$1.1 million (2021)
- Built: 2013–present
- In commission: 2014–present
- Completed: 13
- Lost: 1

General characteristics
- Displacement: 28 metric tons
- Length: 18 m (59 ft) LOA, 16.2 m (53 ft) LWL
- Beam: 4.2 m (13 ft 9 in)
- Draught: 0.7 m (2 ft 4 in)
- Depth: 2.25 m (7 ft 5 in)
- Ramps: 1 × Forward landing ramp
- Propulsion: 2 × Caterpillar C18 Acert, 2 × 1,150 BHP; 2 × Hamilton Jet, Type HJ 403
- Speed: 35 knots (65 km/h) (early model), 40 knots (74 km/h) maximum (current model)
- Range: 250 nmi (460 km)
- Troops: 30 person
- Crew: 3 person
- Armament: Kongsberg Defence Systems Sea Protector 12.7 mm RCWS

The KMC Komando is a class of fast assault craft built by Indonesian shipbuilder PT Tesco Indomaritim. The manufacturer designated it as Combat Boat 18M.

== History ==
This ship is the result of R&D for the Indonesian Army, especially soldiers from the Directorate of Supply and Transport (Ditbekang) in collaboration with related experts from the Sepuluh Nopember Institute of Technology (ITS) Surabaya, the process of which has been started since 2013. Eventually, the fast boat, named 'Komando', was produced by the PT Tesco Indomaritim.

KMC Komando was officially launched on April 29, 2014, by the then Chief of Staff of the Indonesian Army (KASAD), General TNI Budiman, at ABC Beach (Ancol Beach City) North Jakarta. In the demonstration that day, KMC Komando demonstrated its ability to maneuver in narrow circles, stop short distances, lower troops and fire their weapons.

== Technical details ==
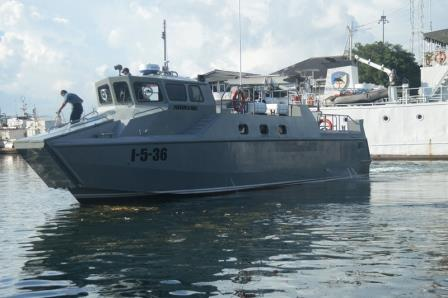
KMC Komando of Patkamla Bali

The ship's hull is built using aluminum, with dimensions of 17.60 m long, 4.20 m wide, 2.15 m high, 0.75 m draft and weighing 23 tons. It is powered by a pair of Hamilton HJ422 water jets powered by a Caterpillar CAT C12 ACERT diesel engine that produces 1,500 hp (2×750). It has a cruising speed of 35 knots (65 km/h), can maneuver 360 degrees in small circles and make sudden stops over short distances.

This factory-made ship located in Babelan, Bekasi is lined up to operate in estuary and coastal areas (not deep sea) capable of sailing as far as 250 nautical miles (463 km). In each operation this ship also carries 500 liters of fresh water stored in tanks. The standard equipment attached to the KMC Command is marine radar, gyro compass, GPS, SSB Radio, HT Radio, Ring Buoy and 2 Life Rafts.

To run it, this ship is operated by a crew of three which can carry 30 passengers. In addition to being used as a vehicle for transporting soldiers and supplies in daily tasks, KMC Komando in war missions (amphibious operations) can remove half a platoon of armed troops to the shore that storms out through the ramp at the front of the ship.

As a weapon for fire support or self-defense, there is an RCWS (Remote Control Weapon System) mounted on the tower pole behind the cabin which is equipped with a 12.7 mm caliber Browning M2HB machine gun, so it can be used to sweep the farthest target (enemy) up to a distance of 2,000 meters.

== Accident ==
A KMC Komando sank in the waters of the Kepulauan Seribu on Monday, 12 March 2018, at 11.00 West Indonesian Time. At that time, the boat was carrying 50 soldiers. All passengers and crew of the ship survived this accident. The Indonesian army denied that it sunk because of overcapacity, the crew said that water enters the engine room due to a leak from the trainer pipe. The leak was exacerbated by the high sea waves that reached two to three meters. The water then enters the engine room, so the captain of the ship turned off the engine which is already full of water. The weight of the ship that has entered the water becomes heavy, causing the ship to sink slowly.

== Operators ==
- Indonesia: 13 produced for Indonesian Army and navy.

== See also ==
- CB90
- Raptor-class patrol boat
- Multipurpose Assault Craft
- Antasena-class combat boat
