= Raptor-class patrol boat =

Class of patrol boats of the Russian Navy

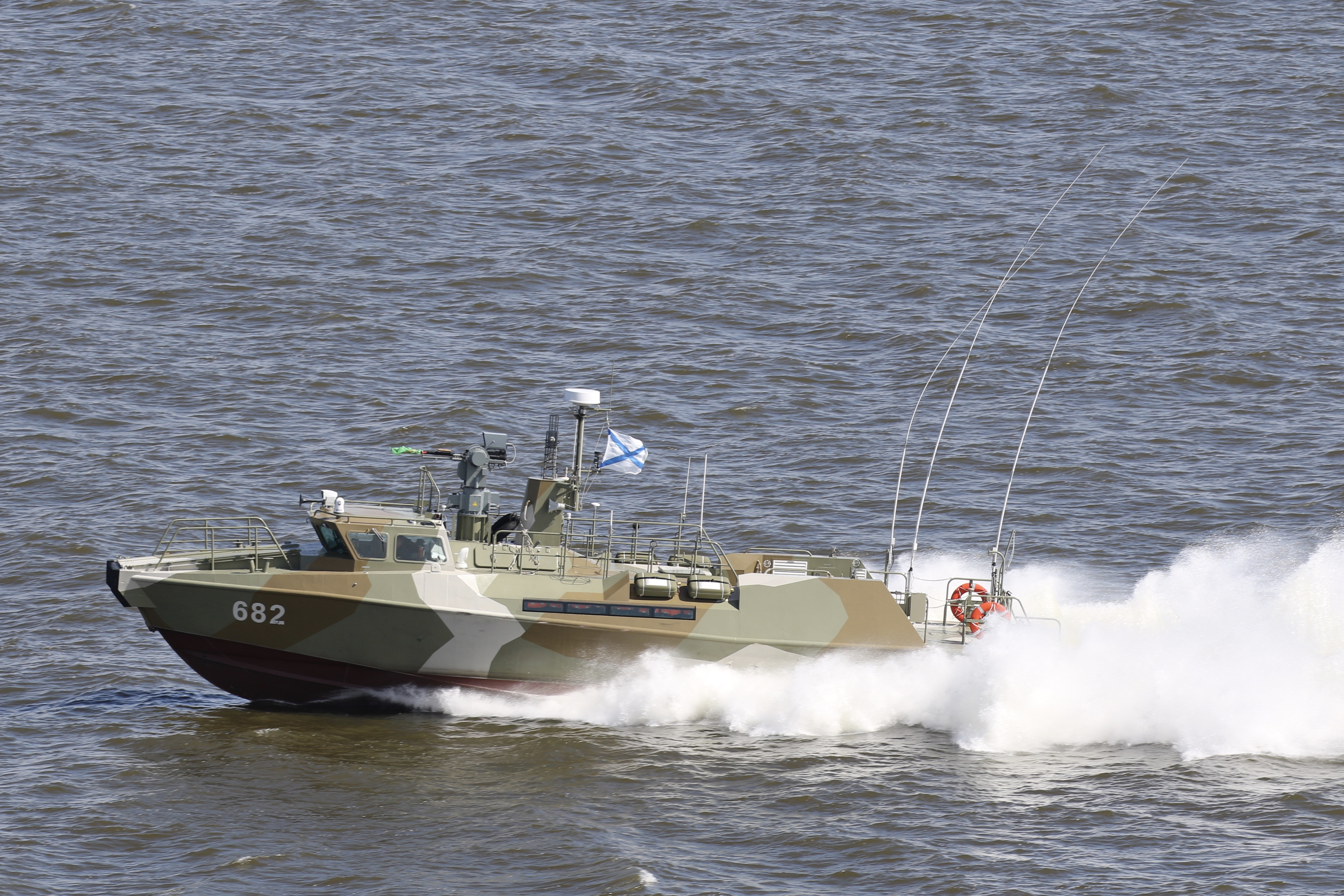
- Project 03160 patrol boat

Class overview
- Name: Project 03160 Raptor-class
- Builders: Pella shipyard
- Operators: Russian Navy
- Built: 2013 – present
- In service: Since 2015
- In commission: Since 2014
- Planned: 24
- Completed: 17
- Active: 12+ (c. 9 Baltic, 2+ Black Sea/Mediterranean, 1 Caspian) (some boats transferred to the Black Sea from the Baltic, notably P-342 "Yunarmeets Baltiki")
- Lost: 3-4? sunk, several damaged.

General characteristics
- Type: Patrol boat
- Displacement: 23 tons
- Length: 16.9 m (55 ft) overall
- Beam: 4.1 m (13 ft 5 in)
- Height: 3.5 m (11 ft 6 in)
- Draught: 0.9 m (2 ft 11 in) max
- Propulsion: 2 × Caterpillar C18 ACERT diesel engines, producing 845 kilowatts (1,133 hp) each; 2 × Kamewa 36A3 HS waterjets
- Speed: 20 knots (37 km/h) (at a wave height of 4.5 m (15 ft)), 28 knots (52 km/h) (at a wave height of 2.5 m (8.2 ft)), 48 knots (89 km/h) full speed
- Range: 300 nmi (560 km) at 20 knots (37 km/h)
- Troops: 20 marines
- Crew: 3 people
- Armament: 1 × 12.7 mm Kord machinegun; 2 × 7.62 mm PKP Pecheneg machine gun; 8 × 9M133 Kornet guided missiles
- Armour: Armored panels of classes GOST 5 and 5a, bullet-resistant glass 39 mm (1.5 in) thick

The Raptor-class patrol boat, Russian designation Project 03160, is a series of Russian high-speed coastal patrol boats. Boats of the class belong to the 4th rank ships in the Russian Navy. This project was developed by the design bureau of JSC Leningrad Shipyard Pella on the instructions of the Russian Navy. The boats are built at the Pella shipyard in the town of Otradnoye, Leningrad Region. Due to the great similarity in appearance, the boats of the project can be confused with the Swedish CB90-class fast assault craft and other transport and landing boats of the 02510 BK-16 project, developed by the Kalashnikov concern and manufactured at Rybinsk shipyard.

At least five Raptor-class patrol boats have been visually recorded as destroyed or damaged during the Russian invasion of Ukraine.

== Role ==
The boats are designed for patrolling, search and rescue operations, and the transfer of troops in the coastal zone of the seas, straits and river estuaries at a maximum distance of up to 160 kilometres (100 mi) from the base. They can also be part of a large amphibious assault ship or a universal amphibious assault ship, located in the docking chamber or on board.

Main goals: patrolling the water area; assistance to the forces of the FSB in the protection of the state border of Russia; defense of naval bases; ensuring the safety of ships on unprotected roadsteads; detection, interception, and detention of small targets; high-speed delivery of groups (up to 20 people) with weapons, gear, and equipment; ensuring the actions of special purpose units; rescue of people in the areas of duty; search and rescue operations. A medical evacuation boat was developed on the basis of the main project. At the Navy parade in St. Petersburg July 2022, a version was shown with 8 Kornet missiles.

== Design ==
The bridge with two crew workstations and controls is shifted to the bow of the boat, it has armor protection of classes 5 and 5a, the windows are made of bullet-resistant glass 39 mm (1.5 in) thick. The troop compartment is located behind the wheelhouse. For disembarkation / landing of the group, the upper and rear hatches of the troop compartment or the passage from the bow ramp through the wheelhouse are used. Also, a bow ramp can be used for landing troops. In case of possible flooding of one of the compartments, it is blocked by a water-gas-tight door, which prevents water from entering other compartments and subsequent flooding of the boat. The boats have a crew of 3, and a landing capacity of 20. The engine room is located aft of the vessel; according to the manufacturer, it is equipped with two American 6-cylinder Caterpillar C18 ACERT E-rating turbo diesels 860 kW (1,150 hp) at 2300 rpm, 18.1 litres (1,100 in^{3}) displacement, cylinder block configuration - L6, then there is a so-called clutch mechanism, followed by a shaft line (motor - coupling - propeller shaft) for the English "Rolls-Royce" Kamewa 36A3 HS jet propellers. In the base of the ship's hull, the volume of this water conduit is 170 litres (45 US gal).

In 2022 it was reported that the Pella Shipyard had designed a new so-called "2.0" version of the Raptor incorporating Russian engines with a total capacity of 1678 kW as well as two guided missile launchers, laser detection, and a passive jamming system. The missiles, described to be at "a preliminary testing stage", were reportedly designed to counter unmanned aerial vehicles (potentially of the type that have been used to attack other vessels of the class during the Ukraine War). It was unclear whether the updated version of the Raptor would actually be built.

== Construction ==
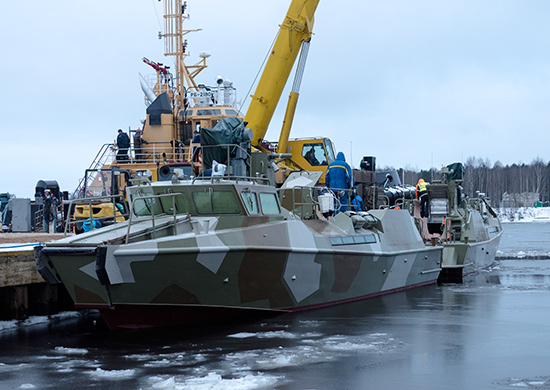
Launching two boats (serial numbers 709 and 710)

The lead boat of the P-274 project (serial number 701) was launched on 15 August 2013, and by 27 August, mooring tests were completed.

On 30 June 2014, it became known that a contract was signed between the Pella plant and the Ministry of Defense of the Russian Federation for the construction of boats of project 03160 Raptor, according to which the plant undertook to supply 4 boats in 2014, and 4 boats in 2015.

The second serial boat "P-275" (serial number 702) was launched for factory sea trials on 17 June 2014, then the third serial boat "P-276" (serial number 703). By the end of 2014, it was planned to transfer 4 boats to the Russian Navy. In fact, three boats were launched and ready to start testing - "P-275", "P-276" and "P-281". Tests of these boats began in December 2014, and on 5 March 2015, they were accepted into the Russian Black Sea Fleet in a detachment of anti-sabotage forces and assets of the Novorossiysk naval base. On 12 June 2015, on the Day of Russia, the Andreevskie flags were raised on them.

The fourth serial boat "P-281" (serial number 704) was launched in 2014. Upon completion of the tests, the boat was accepted by the state commission on 25 March 2015. Enlisted in the Russian Baltic Fleet based at Kronstadt. From 1 to 5 July, it was presented at the International Maritime Defense Show in St. Petersburg.

Two more patrol boats joined the Navy at the end of November 2015 after the completion of sea, government and factory tests. A series of eight units was completed by a boat, which was received by the Russian Navy on 28 December 2015.

In May 2016, it became known that the Russian Ministry of Defense signed a contract with the Leningrad shipyard Pella for the supply by the end of 2018 of more than 10 patrol boats of the 03160 Raptor project and the road tugs of the 16609 project for the Russian Navy. On 15 December 2016, two more boats were launched, factory # 709 and # 710, for the Russian Navy.

On 15 April 2020, at the Pella plant, two boats numbered 715 and 716 of the 03160 Raptor project were launched, these are the 15th and 16th boats from the series, on 15 July 2020, they entered the Baltic Fleet of the Russian Navy.

On 14 November 2020, at the Pella shipyard, the ceremony of handing over the 17th boat from the series 03160 Raptor to the Russian Navy was held.

== Combat damage and losses ==
On or about 21 March 2022, one Raptor-class boat was damaged according to Russian officials. Ukrainian sources claimed it was sunk by a Ukrainian soldier using a man-portable rocket launcher system near Mariupol.

On 2 May 2022, Ukraine provided visual evidence that its Bayraktar TB2 drones destroyed two Raptor-class boats near Snake (Zmiinyi) Island that morning.

On 7 May 2022, Ukraine claimed the destruction of two additional Raptor-class boats, the damaging of a third one, along with the destruction of a Serna class landing craft, near Snake Island.

By 9 May 2022, Raptor total losses amounted to 5, leaving 3 operational with the Black Sea Fleet from a pre-war estimate of 8 units. At least one, P-342 "Yunarmeets Baltiki" withstood the damage and was filmed in Sevastopol for repairs.

One source listed at least three Raptor-class boats as destroyed as of mid-2024. The Russian Navy may also have shifted some Raptor-class boats to the Black Sea Fleet from other fleets. Notably, "Yunarmeets Baltiki" had been originally assigned to the Baltic Fleet, but was serving in the Black Sea Fleet when attacked in 2022.

In late 2024, prior to the Russian evacuation, some Raptors were reported operational at Tartus naval base in Syria. They were again reported operational at the base as of June 2026 when Russian forces returned.

== See also ==
- CB90, Swedish combat boat
- KMC Komando, Indonesian combat boat
- Multipurpose Assault Craft, Philippine combat boat
