= Dockstavarvet =

Swedish shipyard

Coordinates: 63.0472°N 18.3266°E

Dockstavarvet (Eng.: the Docksta Wharf) is a Swedish shipyard located in the small village of Docksta, in the municipality of Kramfors, by the Gulf of Bothnia.

The company was founded in 1905 by Nils and Carl Sundin as N & C Sundins Båtbyggeri; the current name of the company simply means "Docksta shipyard".

In the 1970s Dockstavarvet began specializing in aluminium vessels, such as pilot boats, patrol crafts, and lifeboats. In the mid 1980s the company was commissioned to build a military assault craft, known as the Combat Boat 90, for the Swedish Marines. This has been the company's most successful product, with around 250 to 300 units built.

In 2000, Dockstavarvet acquired the Rindö naval yard, which remains the primary repair facility for the Swedish Navy's CB90s.

The Russian Border Patrol operates 11 Interceptor Craft 16M built on designs presumably stolen from Dockstavarvet in a security breach. These boats are based on CB90 design concept but not identical to it.
