= Min Jiang-class minelayer =

Taiwanese naval class since 2020

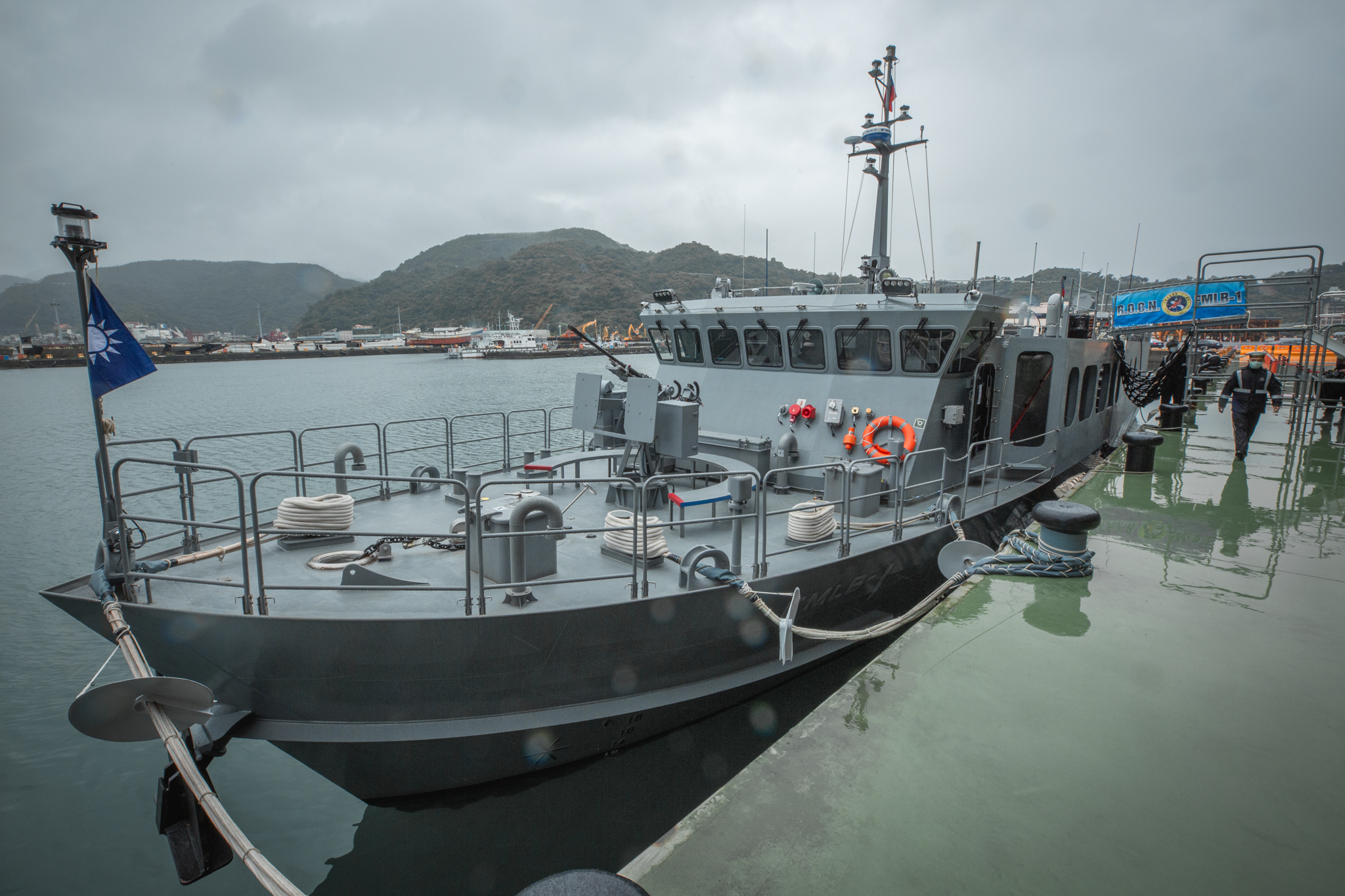

Class overview
- Builders: Lung Teh Shipbuilding Co.
- Operators: Republic of China Navy
- Built: 2019-2021
- In commission: 2020-Present
- Planned: 10
- Completed: 4
- Active: 4

General characteristics
- Type: Minelayer
- Displacement: 347 tons
- Length: 41m
- Beam: 8.8m
- Draft: 1.7m
- Speed: 14 knots
- Armament: 1 x T-75 cannon, 2 x T74 machine gun

The Min Jiang-class minelayer is a class of minelayers in service with the Republic of China Navy (ROCN) built by Lung Teh Shipbuilding.

== Naming ==
The vessels are referred to as the Min Jiang-class by the media. However, the official class designation remains unknown. The first vessel is designated FMLB-I, with FMLB standing for Fast Mine Laying Boat. It is assumed that the other minelayers have a similar designation.

== Design ==
The Min Jiang-class displaces 347 tons at full load, with a maximum speed of 14 knots. Length is 41m, width is 8.8m and draft is 1.7m.

The vessels have a precision automatic mine laying system. In addition to its mines, the vessels are equipped with a T-75 cannon and T74 machine guns. These are most likely intended to be used in the anti-aircraft role or against small boat swarms.

== Service history ==
The first vessel was launched in August 2020 at Lung Teh Shipbuilding's Yilan County Shipyard.

The second vessel was delivered in September 2021, and the ROCN took delivery of the third and fourth vessel in December 2021.

The Min Jiang-class replaced converted amphibious landing craft in the minelaying role.

The Navy placed an order with Lung Teh for six additional vessels in 2025.
