= Lungteh Shipbuilding =

Taiwanese shipbuilder

- Native name: 龍德造船
- Company type: Private
- Industry: Shipbuilding
- Founded: 1979
- Headquarters: Yilan County, Taiwan
- Number of locations: 6
- Website: http://www.lts.com.tw/LungTeh/en/

Lungteh Shipbuilding
- Traditional Chinese: 龍德造船工業股份有限公司
- Simplified Chinese: 龙德造船工业股份有限公司
Transcriptions
Standard Mandarin
- Hanyu Pinyin: Lóngdé Zàochuán Gōngyè Gǔfèn Yǒuxiàn Gōngsī

Alternative Chinese name
- Traditional Chinese: 龍德造船
- Simplified Chinese: 龙德造船
Transcriptions
Standard Mandarin
- Hanyu Pinyin: Lóngdé Zàochuán

Lungteh Shipbuilding (also spelled Lung Teh or Longde, Chinese: 龍德造船) is a Taiwanese ship and boat builder headquartered in Yilan County.

== History ==
Lungteh was established in 1979.

In 2018 Lungteh won a contract to produce eleven Tuo Chiang Block II corvette and four minelayers for the Taiwanese Navy.

Lungteh exhibited at IDEX in 2019 alongside other Taiwanese defense companies.

In 2019 Lungteh Shipbuilding launched an 80-ton 28m long high speed catamaran research and test vessel named Glorious Star (光榮之星) for the National Chung-Shan Institute of Science and Technology.

On May 24, 2019 Taiwanese President Tsai Ing-Wen visited Lungteh to highlight the mass production of the Tuo Chiang Block II corvette, dubbed a "carrier killer" by the press. She gave a speech about asymmetrically countering China’s military with smart military procurement and technological innovation.

In August 2020 they launched the first of four Min Jiang-class minelayers ordered by the Taiwanese Navy. Class delivery was completed in December 2021.

In March 2024, the final two corvettes from the initial batch of six ordered from Lungteh, PPG-625 An Chiang and PPG 626 Wan Chiang, were commissioned at Su'ao Harbor in Yilan. Production of the second batch of corvettes began in 2024 with production expected to be completed by the end of 2026. Five ships are planned in the second batch. The first ship from the second batch, Dan Chiang (丹江, PGG-627), was launched in July 2025.

In April 2025 Navy placed an order with Lungteh for six additional Min Jiang-class minelayers.

In June 2025 Lungteh entered its Black Tide USV into trials being conducted by the Taiwanese military. The Black Tide has a top speed of 43 knots (80kph) and can be configured for either reconnaissance or strike.

In July 2025 China placed Lungteh on an export control list due to its work for the Taiwanese military. Responding to the ban, Lungteh said that the materials it sourced from China were "all highly replaceable."

== Operations ==
Lungteh has five production facilities in Yilan county and offices in Taipei and Singapore.

Lungteh has produced fast ferries, wind farm supply vessels, coastal patrol craft, high speed special forces craft, fireboats, and pilot boats.

Lungteh is a partner in producing the Multipurpose Assault Craft series of combat boats for the Philippine Navy. The series had four variants as of 2018.

In cooperation with ST Engineering Lungteh has produced the Venus 16 unmanned surface vehicle.

Along with NCSIST Lungteh has produced the Hui Long-class UUV.

== Gallery ==
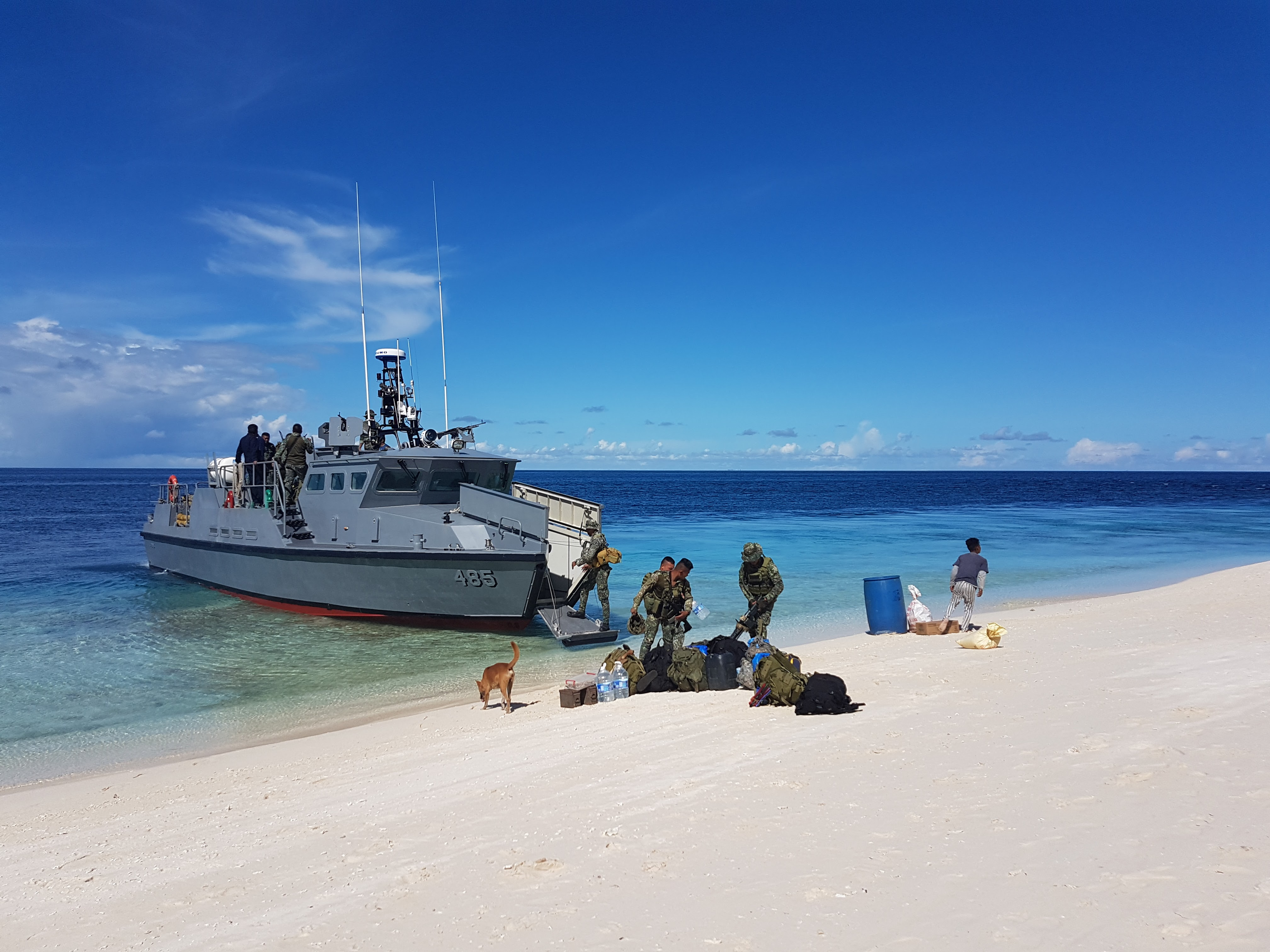
Philippine Navy Multipurpose Assault Craft Mk2

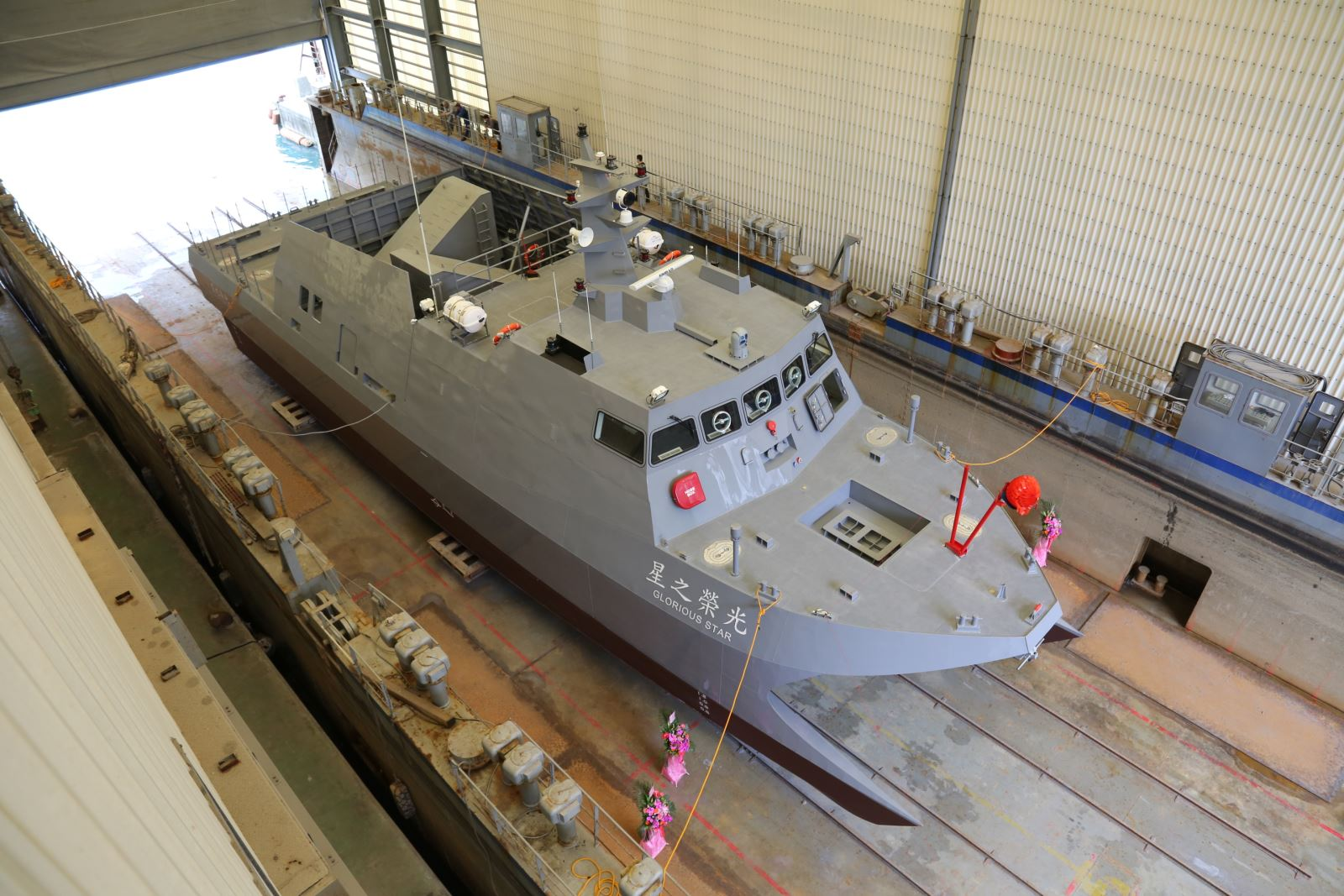
NCSIST test ship Glorious Star

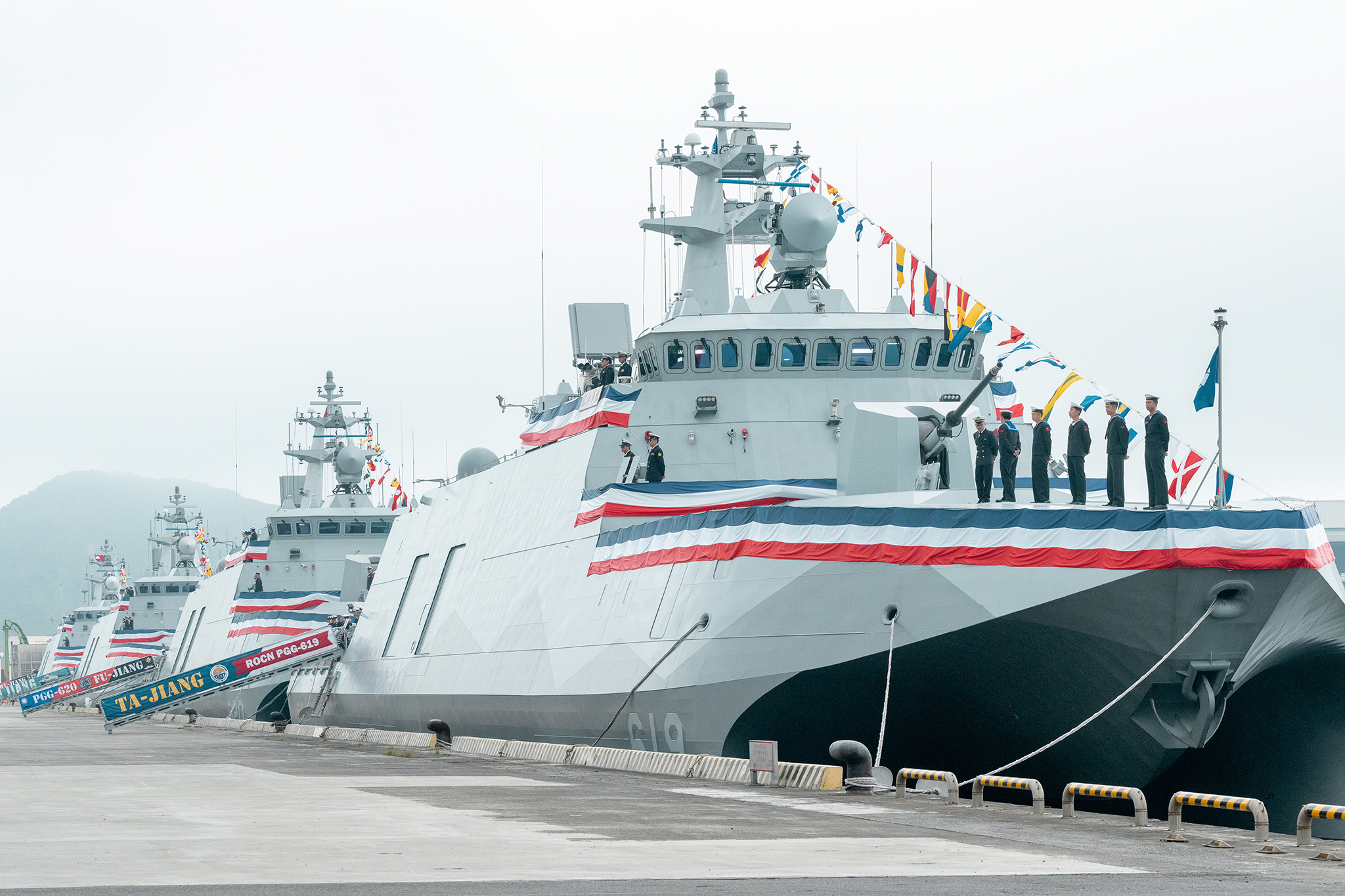
Four Tuo Chiang-class corvettes pierside

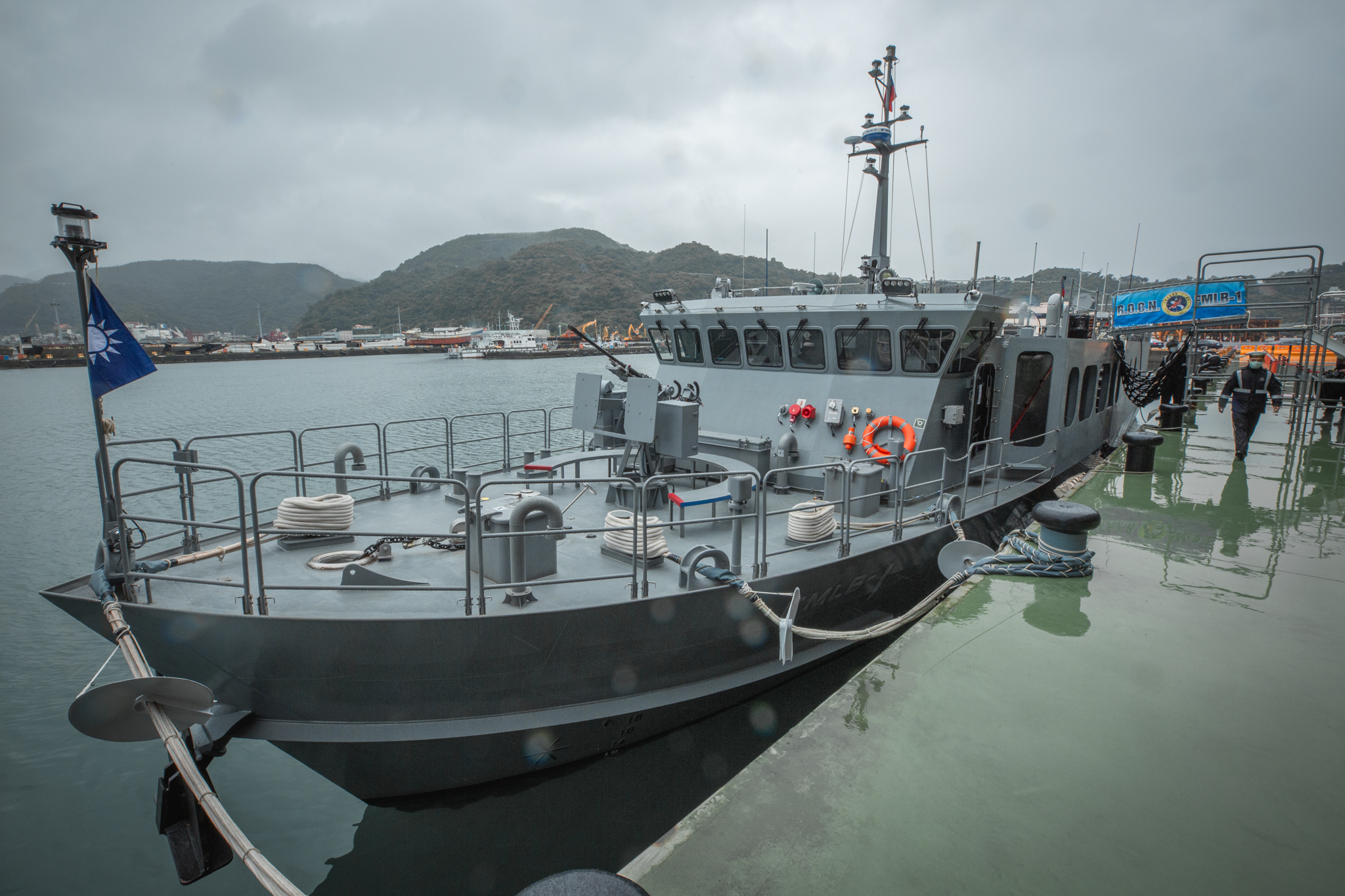
Min Jiang-class minelayer

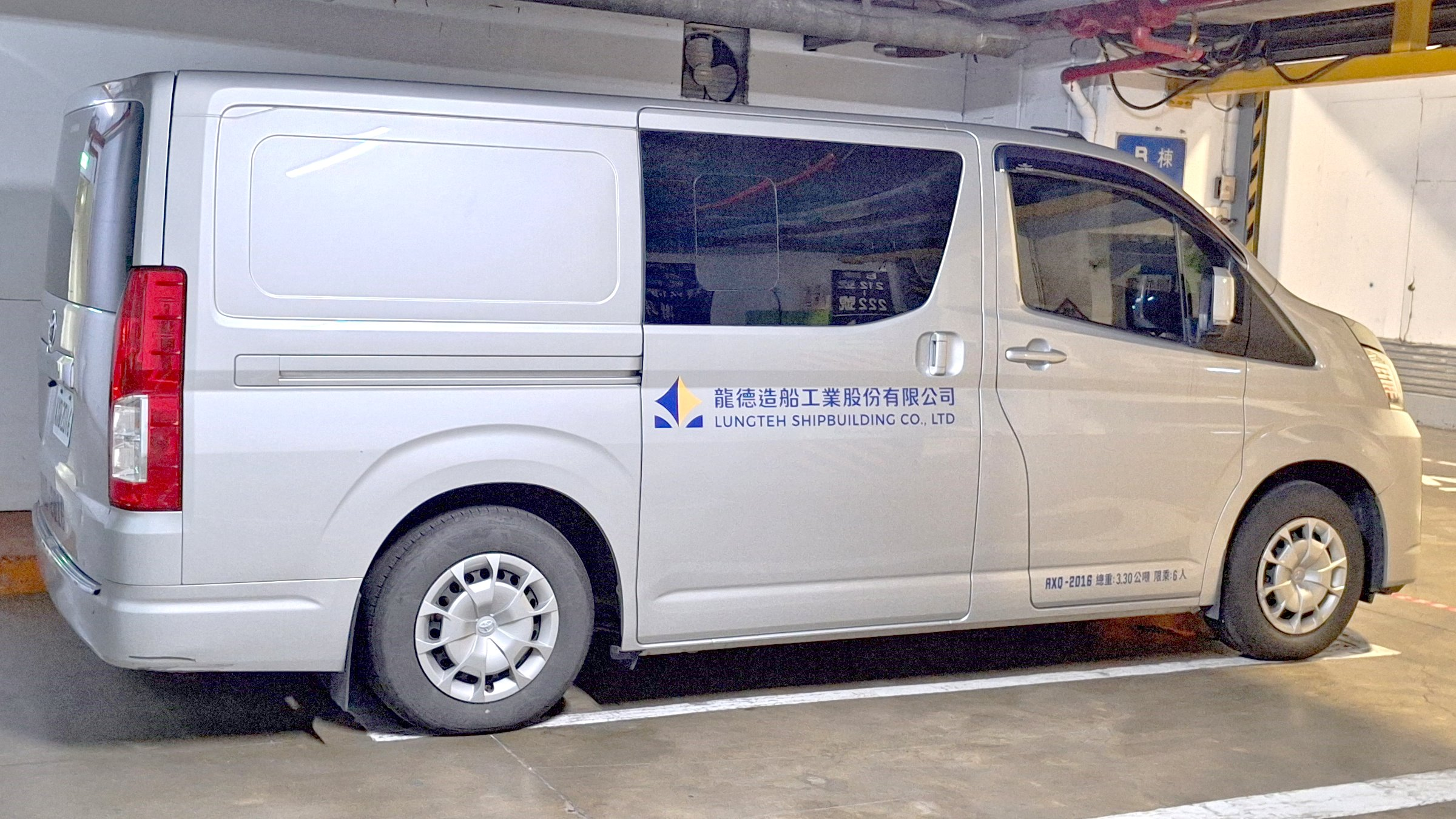
Lungteh Shipbuilding fleet van

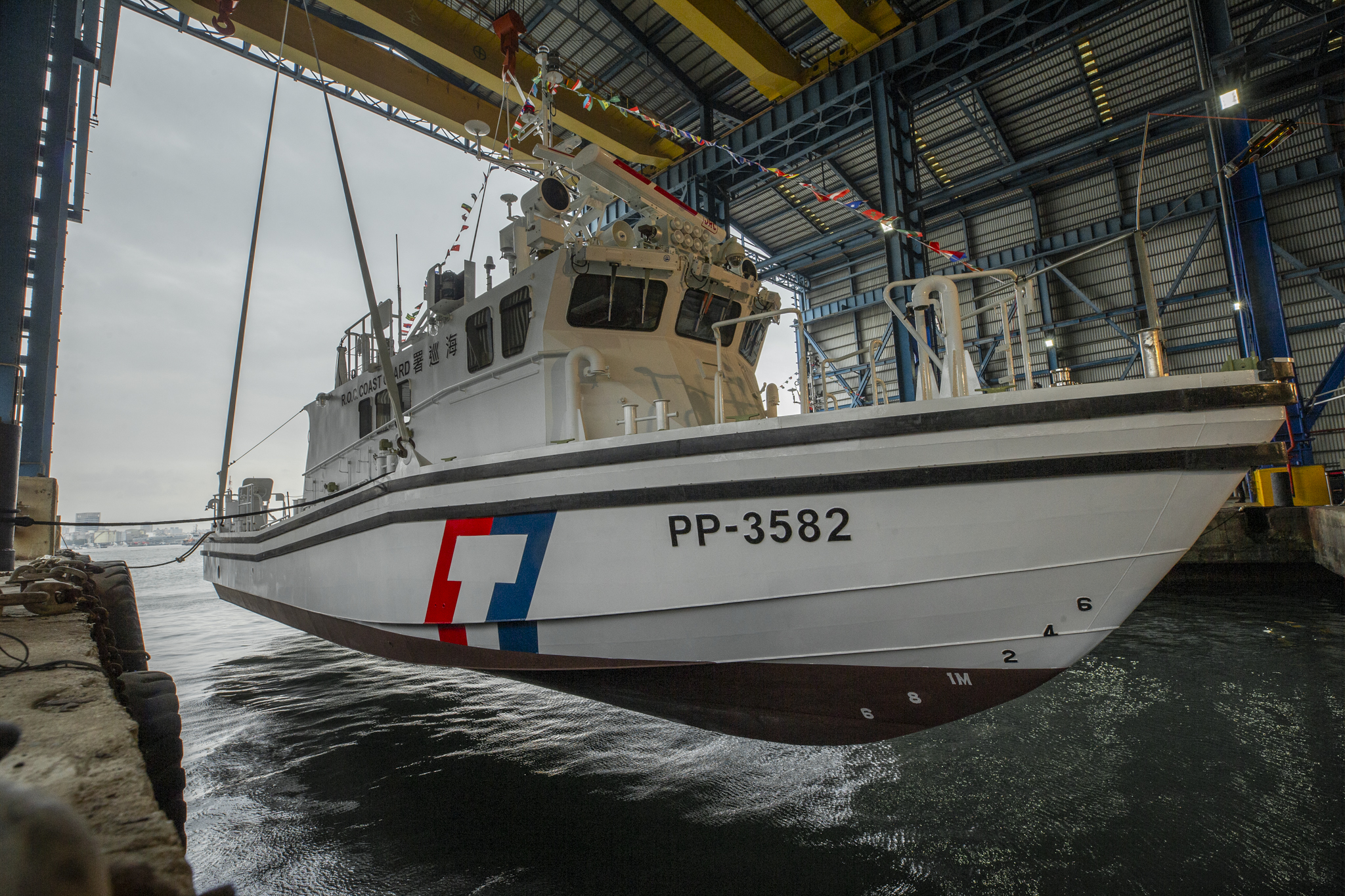
Coast Guard Administration patrol vessel PP-3582 at launch

== See also ==
- Jong Shyn Shipbuilding Company
- CSBC Corporation, Taiwan
