= Swedish Life Saving Society =

Swedish lifesaving organization

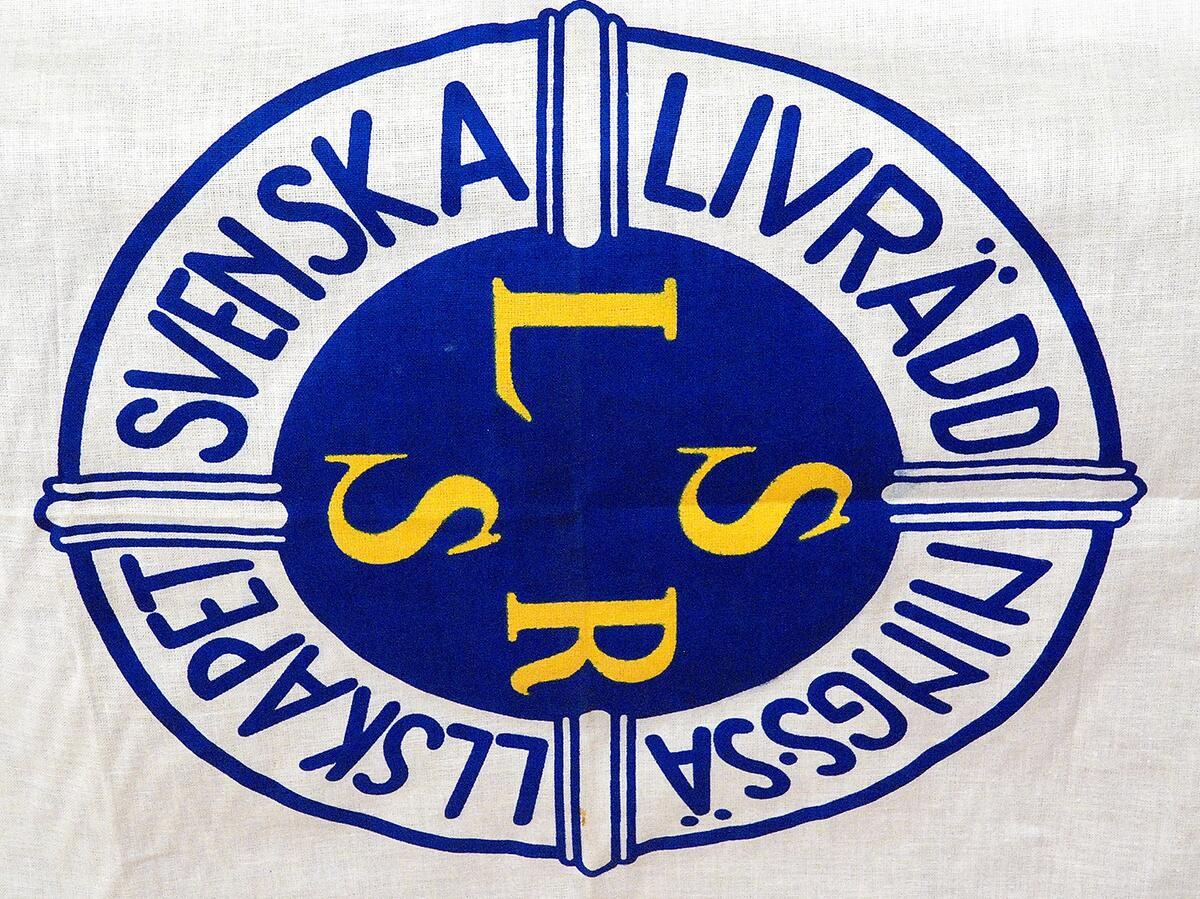
Svenska Livräddningssällskapet flag

The Swedish Life Saving Society (Swedish: Svenska Livräddningssällskapet) was founded on 28 November 1898 at Stockholm palace. At the time it was founded, more than one thousand people drowned in Sweden every year. Today around one hundred and ten people drown in Sweden each year.

The Swedish Life Saving Society, SLS, educates more than 2,000 swimming instructors, pool attendants, and lifeguards each year. The society runs the only lifeguard school in Scandinavia. It is the second largest organisation teaching swimming lessons in Sweden, only exceeded by the Swedish Swimming Federation. The society is a member of the International Lifesaving Federation. Karin Brand is the current general secretary.

== See also ==
- Swedish Sea Rescue Society
