= List of active Swedish Navy ships =

Naval ensign of Royal Swedish Navy

This is a list of active ships of the Royal Swedish Navy.

== Submarine service ==
These ships are operated by the 1st Submarine Flotilla which is based at the Karlskrona Naval Base.

Class	Quantity	Origin	Image	Type	Builder	Ship	No.	Comm.	Dp.	Notes
Submarines in service (4)
Södermanland class Projekt A17	1	Sweden		Diesel-electric / AIP, attack submarines	Kockums	HSwMS Södermanland	Söd	Apr 1989	1,400 tonnes (surfaced); 1,500 tonnes (submerged)	Modernised between 2022 and 2024. To be replaced by the Blekinge class. Submarine to be leased to Poland.
Gotland class Projekt A19	3	Sweden		Diesel-electric / AIP, attack submarines	Kockums	HSwMS Gotland	Gtd	Apr 1996 (commissioned after MLU in Jun 2018)	1,494 tonnes (surfaced); 1,599 tonnes (submerged)	All underwent their mid-life upgrade by February 2025.
Gotland class Projekt A19	3	Sweden		Diesel-electric / AIP, attack submarines	Kockums	HSwMS Halland	Hnd	Jul 1997 (commissioned after MLU in Dec 2020)	1,494 tonnes (surfaced); 1,599 tonnes (submerged)	All underwent their mid-life upgrade by February 2025.
Gotland class Projekt A19	3	Sweden		Diesel-electric / AIP, attack submarines	Kockums	HSwMS Uppland	Upd	Oct 1997 (commissioned after MLU in Feb 2025)	1,494 tonnes (surfaced); 1,599 tonnes (submerged)	All underwent their mid-life upgrade by February 2025.
Submarine support ships (2)
–	1	Netherlands		Submarine rescue ship / diving support vessel	De Hoop	HSwMS Belos	A214	Nov 1992 (in the Swedish Navy) (commissioned in 1985 for the oil and gas industry)	6,150 tonnes	
URF; Ubåtsräddningsfarkost	1	Sweden		Submarine rescue vehicle	Kockums	–	–	1978	54 tonnes	
Autonomous underwater vehicles
AUV62-AT ASW	Undisclosed	Sweden	–	ASW training system	Saab	–	–	2016 to 2019	–	

== Combat surface fleet ==
Class	Quantity	Origin	Image	Type	Builder	Ship	No.	Comm.	Dp.	Notes
Corvettes (7)
Visby class (Note: Visby class to be modernised with Mk41 VLS and CAMM / Sea Ceptor air defence missiles.)	5	Sweden		Corvette (ASuW, ASW and patrol)	Saab Kockums	HSwMS Visby	K31	Dec 2012	600 tonnes	
Visby class	5	Sweden		Corvette (ASuW, ASW and patrol)	Saab Kockums	HSwMS Helsingborg	K32	Dec 2009	600 tonnes	
Visby class	5	Sweden		Corvette (ASuW, ASW and patrol)	Saab Kockums	HSwMS Härnösand	K33	Dec 2009	600 tonnes	
Visby class	5	Sweden		Corvette (ASuW, ASW and patrol)	Saab Kockums	HSwMS Nyköping	K34	Dec 2012	600 tonnes	
Visby class	5	Sweden		Corvette (ASuW, ASW and patrol)	Saab Kockums	HSwMS Karlstad	K35	Dec 2012	600 tonnes	
Gävle class (Formerly Göteborg class)	2	Sweden		Corvette	Karlskronavarvet AB	HSwMS Gävle	K22	Sep 1990 (Back in service in May 2022 after MLU)	380 tonnes	
Gävle class (Formerly Göteborg class)	2	Sweden		Corvette	Karlskronavarvet AB	HSwMS Sundsvall	K24	Jun 1993 (Back in service in Dec 2022 after MLU)	380 tonnes	
Patrol vessels (13)
Stockholm class	2	Sweden		Patrol vessel	Karlskronavarvet AB	HSwMS Stockholm	P11	May 1986	380 tonnes	Formerly classified as corvette.
Stockholm class	2	Sweden		Patrol vessel	Karlskronavarvet AB	HSwMS Malmö	P12	May 1986	380 tonnes	Formerly classified as corvette.
Tapper class (Swedish other designation: Spaningsbåt 82)	6	Sweden		Reconnaissance boat	Swede Ship Marine (Djupvik shipyard)	HSwMS Djärv	82	1993	62 tonnes	
Tapper class (Swedish other designation: Spaningsbåt 82)	6	Sweden		Reconnaissance boat	Swede Ship Marine (Djupvik shipyard)	HSwMS Dristig	83	1994	62 tonnes	
Tapper class (Swedish other designation: Spaningsbåt 82)	6	Sweden		Reconnaissance boat	Swede Ship Marine (Djupvik shipyard)	HSwMS Händig	84	1994	62 tonnes	
Tapper class (Swedish other designation: Spaningsbåt 82)	6	Sweden		Reconnaissance boat	Swede Ship Marine (Djupvik shipyard)	HSwMS Trygg	85	1994	62 tonnes	
Tapper class (Swedish other designation: Spaningsbåt 82)	6	Sweden		Reconnaissance boat	Swede Ship Marine (Djupvik shipyard)	HSwMS Modig	86	1995	62 tonnes	
Tapper class (Swedish other designation: Spaningsbåt 82)	6	Sweden		Reconnaissance boat	Swede Ship Marine (Djupvik shipyard)	HSwMS Hurtig	87	1995	62 tonnes	
Tapper class (Swedish other designation: Bevakningsbåt 88)	5	Sweden		Patrol boat	Swede Ship Marine (Djupvik shipyard)	HSwMS Rapp	88	1996	62 tonnes	HSwMS Tapper retired in 2011.
Tapper class (Swedish other designation: Bevakningsbåt 88)	5	Sweden		Patrol boat	Swede Ship Marine (Djupvik shipyard)	HSwMS Stolt	89	1997	62 tonnes	HSwMS Tapper retired in 2011.
Tapper class (Swedish other designation: Bevakningsbåt 88)	5	Sweden		Patrol boat	Swede Ship Marine (Djupvik shipyard)	HSwMS Ärlig	90	1998	62 tonnes	HSwMS Tapper retired in 2011.
Tapper class (Swedish other designation: Bevakningsbåt 88)	5	Sweden		Patrol boat	Swede Ship Marine (Djupvik shipyard)	HSwMS Munter	91	1998	62 tonnes	HSwMS Tapper retired in 2011.
Tapper class (Swedish other designation: Bevakningsbåt 88)	5	Sweden		Patrol boat	Swede Ship Marine (Djupvik shipyard)	HSwMS Orädd	92	1999	62 tonnes	HSwMS Tapper retired in 2011.
SIGINT (2)
Artemis class Projekt B104	1	Sweden (systems); Poland (hull)	–	Signal intelligence gathering vessel	Saab Kockums / Nauta Shipyard	HSwMS Artemis	A202	Nov 2023	3,000 tonnes	Successor of the HSwMS Orion.
Orion class	1	Sweden		Signal intelligence gathering vessel	Kockums	HSwMS Orion	A201	Jun 1984	1,400 tonnes	Retired in 2025. To be rebuilt as a test vessel and recommssioned by 2028.
Mine warfare ships (7)
Koster class (Note: The Koster class is a renamed class after the modernisation of the Landsort class. Two of the Koster class are being modernised by Saab.) (Saab designation: MCMV 47)	5	Sweden		Mine-countermeasure vessels	Karlskronavarvet AB	HSwMS Koster	M73	Nov 1986	400 tonnes	
Koster class (Saab designation: MCMV 47)	5	Sweden		Mine-countermeasure vessels	Karlskronavarvet AB	HSwMS Kullen	M74	Nov 1986	400 tonnes	
Koster class (Saab designation: MCMV 47)	5	Sweden		Mine-countermeasure vessels	Karlskronavarvet AB	HSwMS Vinga	M75	Nov 1987	400 tonnes	
Koster class (Saab designation: MCMV 47)	5	Sweden		Mine-countermeasure vessels	Karlskronavarvet AB	HSwMS Ven	M76	Dec 1988	400 tonnes	
Koster class (Saab designation: MCMV 47)	5	Sweden		Mine-countermeasure vessels	Karlskronavarvet AB	HSwMS Ulvön	M77	Oct 1992	400 tonnes	
Spårö class (Note: The Spårö class is a class that was renamed after the Styrsö class was converted to operate mine clearance divers in shallow waters.)	2	Sweden		Diving support vessel (Former mine-countermeasure vessel)	Kockums	HSwMS Spårö	M12	1996 (Back in service in 2005 after MLU)	205 tonnes	
Spårö class	2	Sweden		Diving support vessel (Former mine-countermeasure vessel)	Kockums	HSwMS Sturkö	M14	1997 (Back in service in 2005 after MLU)	205 tonnes	
Landing craft (83)
Svävare 2000 (Griffon overwork designation: Griffon 8100TD)	3	United Kingdom		Landing craft / hovercraft	Griffon Hoverwork	–	302	2007	–	Used by the Amphibious Corps.
Svävare 2000 (Griffon overwork designation: Griffon 8100TD)	3	United Kingdom		Landing craft / hovercraft	Griffon Hoverwork	–	303	2007	–	Used by the Amphibious Corps.
Svävare 2000 (Griffon overwork designation: Griffon 8100TD)	3	United Kingdom		Landing craft / hovercraft	Griffon Hoverwork	–	304	2007	–	Used by the Amphibious Corps.
Gruppbåt class (Marine Alutech designation: Watercat M8)	80 (Note: 100 boats were originally acquired., of these, 20 were donated to Ukraine in early 2024.)	Finland		Landing craft (fast troop transport over water bodies)	Marine Alutech	–	–	1995 to 1999	3 tonnes	Used by the Amphibious Corps and can be used by the Home Guard.
Fast attack boats (103)
Stridsbåt 90H (Saab designation: CB90 class)	43 (Note: Ships purchased: 12 Stridsbåt 90H Series 1; 63 Stridsbåt 90H Series 2; Donations: 32 Stridsbåt 90H donated in total to Ukraine as part of a support package of January 2025: 10 pledged in February 2024; 6 pledged in September 2024; 16 pledged in January 2025)	Sweden		Fast attack boat	Dockstavarvet / Gotlandsvarv AB	–	–	1991 to 1996	20.5 tonnes	43 in service of the Series 1 and 2 (accounting for the 32 donated to Ukraine).
Stridsbåt 90HS (Saab designation: CB90 class)	27	Sweden		Fast attack boat	Dockstavarvet / Gotlandsvarv AB	–	–	1996 to 1997	20.5 tonnes	Modernised variant with CBRN protection.
Stridsbåt 90HSM (Saab designation: CB90 class)	28 (+ 22 on order)	Sweden	–	Fast attack boat	Saab	–	–	2019 to 2026	20.5 tonnes	18 delivered between 2019 and 2022. 10 more ordered to compensate for the donations to Ukraine. 22 ordered in Q2 2025.
Stridsbåt 90E (Storebro designation: Storebro SB90E)	5 (Note: 52 Stridsbåt 90E boats originally acquired, around 5 remain in use. Some boats were transferred to the Swedish Sea Rescue Society, the Swedish Coast Guard, the Maritime Police, the Swedish Auxiliary Naval Corps and the Veteran Flotilla.)	Sweden		Fast attack boat	AB Storebro Royal Cruiser	–	–	–	6.5 tonnes	A smaller and lighter variant of the CB90, without armament, used for medical, and fire transport, or as deck boats on large ships.

== Auxiliary fleet ==
Class	Quantity	Origin	Image	Type	Builder	Ship	No.	Comm.	Dp.	Notes
Supply and transport ships (24)
–	1	Sweden		Logistics, resupply for combat units	Eurosteel Oskarshamn AB (Oskarshamn Shipyard)	HSwMS Loke	A344	1994	305 tonnes	
Lätt trossbåt	16	Sweden		Logistics, resupply for combat units (Mine laying as secondary role)	Swede Ship Marine (Djupvik shipyard)	–	662 to 677	1995 to 1999	65 tonnes	All boats are to be modernised.
Trossbåt 600	6 (Note: Originally, the Navy had 16 ships (number 603 to 610 and 652 to 657). It was initially used by the Swedish Coastal Artillery. It was replaced by the Lätt trossbåt in this role. Some ships were retired, while some were transferred: Boats 605, 606, 608, 610 and 653 used by the Navy; Boat 604 used by the Home Guard; Boats 603, 652 and 655 operated by the Swedish Coast Guard)	Sweden		Logistics, resupply for combat units	Swede Ship Marine (Djupvik shipyard)	–	604	1982 to 1988	53 tonnes	Used by the Amphibious Corps and can be used by the Home Guard.
Trossbåt 600	6	Sweden		Logistics, resupply for combat units	Swede Ship Marine (Djupvik shipyard)	–	605	1982 to 1988	53 tonnes	Used by the Amphibious Corps and can be used by the Home Guard.
Trossbåt 600	6	Sweden		Logistics, resupply for combat units	Swede Ship Marine (Djupvik shipyard)	–	606	1982 to 1988	53 tonnes	Used by the Amphibious Corps and can be used by the Home Guard.
Trossbåt 600	6	Sweden		Logistics, resupply for combat units	Swede Ship Marine (Djupvik shipyard)	–	608	1982 to 1988	53 tonnes	Used by the Amphibious Corps and can be used by the Home Guard.
Trossbåt 600	6	Sweden		Logistics, resupply for combat units	Swede Ship Marine (Djupvik shipyard)	–	610	1982 to 1988	53 tonnes	Used by the Amphibious Corps and can be used by the Home Guard.
Trossbåt 600	6	Sweden		Logistics, resupply for combat units	Swede Ship Marine (Djupvik shipyard)	–	653	1982 to 1988	53 tonnes	Used by the Amphibious Corps and can be used by the Home Guard.
–	1	Sweden		Sea platoon transport (Former taxi boat)	Jan Skerfe / Aluminum Boats Gryt AB	HSwMS Rödnäbba	–	1990	23 tonnes	Former taxi boat "Långgarn" operated in Stockholm.
Command ships (5)
–	1	Sweden		Command and support ship	Karlskronavarvet AB	HSwMS Carlskrona	P04	Mar 1982 (M04 until 2010 / P04 since 2012)	3,150 tonnes	Modernised in 2005 to receive helicopters and work also as support ship.
Akademik Shuleykin class (Project 637)	1	Finland (construction); Soviet Union (design)		Command and support ship	Valmetin Laivateollisuus Oy	HSwMS Trossö	A264	1996 (in the Swedish Navy) (commissioned in 1984)	2,140 tonnes	Former research vessel, converted for support.
Styrsö class	1	Sweden		Command and staff ship (Former mine-countermeasure vessel)	Kockums	HSwMS Skaftö	17	1997 (converted in Jul 2016)	205 tonnes	Transformed for the 17th Amphibious Patrol Boat Company.
Ledningsbåt 2000 class (Hakanson Marine: TTB 2000)	2	Sweden	–	Command boat	Peter Hakanson Marine AB	–	451	1999	39.9 tonnes	Command boat for the amphibious battalion. Modernised in 2013.
Ledningsbåt 2000 class (Hakanson Marine: TTB 2000)	2	Sweden	–	Command boat	Peter Hakanson Marine AB	–	452	1999	39.9 tonnes	Command boat for the amphibious battalion. Modernised in 2013.
Support ships (2)
–	1	Sweden		Torpedo and robot salvage vessels	Swede Ship Marine (Djupvik shipyard)	HSwMS Pelikanen	A247	1963	130 tonnes	To be replaced by the "Advanced workboats".
Furusund class (lead ship of a prototype class, but only one built)	1	Sweden		Diving and salvage vessels	Åsiverken	HSwMS Furusund	A320	Oct 1983	235 tonnes	To be replaced by the "Advanced workboats".
Tugboats (9)
Damen ASD Tug 3010-ICE class	2	Netherlands (design); Romania (construction)	(illustration image)	Coastal tugboat	Damen - Galați shipyard	HSwMS Hector	A254	2015	575 tonnes	
Damen ASD Tug 3010-ICE class	2	Netherlands (design); Romania (construction)	(illustration image)	Coastal tugboat	Damen - Galați shipyard	HSwMS Hercules	A255	2015	575 tonnes	
Stan Tug 1606-ICE class	4	Netherlands	–	Harbour tugboats	Damen	HSwMS Hermes	A761	Oct 2024	115 tonnes	Successor of the Bastransportbåt 700 class.
Stan Tug 1606-ICE class	4	Netherlands	–	Harbour tugboats	Damen	HSwMS Hera	A762	Oct 2024	115 tonnes	Successor of the Bastransportbåt 700 class.
Stan Tug 1606-ICE class	4	Netherlands	–	Harbour tugboats	Damen	HSwMS Hebe	A763	Oct 2024	115 tonnes	Successor of the Bastransportbåt 700 class.
Stan Tug 1606-ICE class	4	Netherlands	–	Harbour tugboats	Damen	HSwMS Heros	A764	Oct 2024	115 tonnes	Successor of the Bastransportbåt 700 class.
Bastransportbåt 700 class (Also known as 700-båt)	3	Sweden	–	Harbour tugboats	Marinteknik Öregrund	HSwMS Tyr	702	1980	35 tonnes	Being replaced by new tugboats.
Bastransportbåt 700 class (Also known as 700-båt)	3	Sweden	–	Harbour tugboats	Marinteknik Öregrund	HSwMS Ran	753	Around 1980 to 1987	35 tonnes	Being replaced by new tugboats.
Bastransportbåt 700 class (Also known as 700-båt)	3	Sweden	–	Harbour tugboats	Marinteknik Öregrund	HSwMS Eir	755	Around 1980 to 1987	35 tonnes	Being replaced by new tugboats.

== Training ships ==
Class	Quantity	Origin	Image	Type	Builder	Ship	No.	Comm.	Dp.	Notes
Training ships (5)
Altair class	5	Sweden		Training ships	Swede Ship Marine (Djupvik shipyard)	HSwMS Altair	A501	May 2008	85 tonnes	
Altair class	5	Sweden		Training ships	Swede Ship Marine (Djupvik shipyard)	HSwMS Antares	A502	Sep 2008	85 tonnes	
Altair class	5	Sweden		Training ships	Swede Ship Marine (Djupvik shipyard)	HSwMS Arcturus	A503	Dec 2008	85 tonnes	
Altair class	5	Sweden		Training ships	Swede Ship Marine (Djupvik shipyard)	HSwMS Argo	A504	Feb 2009	85 tonnes	
Altair class	5	Sweden		Training ships	Swede Ship Marine (Djupvik shipyard)	HSwMS Astrea	A505	May 2009	85 tonnes	
Sailing boats (2)
Gladan class	2	Sweden		Schooner	Stockholm Naval Shipyard	HSwMS Gladan	S01	Jun 1947	225 tonnes	
Gladan class	2	Sweden		Schooner	Stockholm Naval Shipyard	HSwMS Falken	S02	Oct 1947	225 tonnes	

== Reserve ships ==
=== Combat surface fleet ===
Class	Quantity	Origin	Image	Type	Builder	Ship	No.	Comm.	Dp.	Notes
Mine countermeasures vessel (1)
Styrsö class	1	Sweden		Mine countermeasures vessel	Kockums	HSwMS Styrsö	M11	1996	250 tonnes	In reserve for the moment.

== See also ==
- Swedish armed forces:
  - List of equipment of the Swedish Armed Forces
- Swedish Navy:
  - List of equipment of the Swedish Navy
  - List of future ships of the Swedish Navy
- Swedish Army:
  - List of equipment of the Swedish Army
- Swedish Air Force:
  - Current fleet of the Swedish Air Force
  - List of equipment of the Swedish Air Force
  - Weapons of the Swedish Air Force
  - List of military aircraft of Sweden
- Swedish Home Guard:
  - List of equipment of the Swedish Home Guard
- Swedish Coast Guard:
  - Swedish Coast Guard ships
  - Swedish Coast Guard aviation

== Bibliography ==
- von Hofsten, Gustaf; Waernberg, Jan; Ohlsson, Curt S. (2003). Örlogsfartyg: svenska maskindrivna fartyg under tretungad flagg. [Forum navales skriftserie], 1650-1837; [6] (in Swedish). Stockholm: Svenskt militärhistoriskt bibl. i samarbete med Marinlitteratur. ISBN 919743843X. SELIBR 8873330.
- Saunders, Stephen, ed. (2004). Jane's Fighting Ships 2004–2005. Coulsdon, UK: Jane's Information Group. ISBN 0-7106-2623-1.
