= List of equipment of the Swedish Army =

The military equipment of the Swedish Army includes a wide array of firearms, armoured vehicles, personal equipment, artillery, missile systems, and other essential assets used to maintain national defence and operational effectiveness. The Swedish Defence Materiel Administration (FMV) is responsible for the procurement, development, and maintenance of the Army's equipment, ensuring that it meets the specific demands of Sweden's military doctrine and environmental conditions. While a significant portion of the equipment is of foreign origin, many systems undergo extensive modifications to align with Sweden's unique operational requirements, such as harsh Nordic climates, dense forests, and advanced interoperability with NATO and European defense partners.

Additionally, Sweden maintains a strong domestic defence industry, with companies like Saab AB, BAE Systems AB and Bofors AB contributing advanced indigenous designs, particularly in armoured vehicles, small arms, and sensor technology.

== Personal equipment ==
=== Helmets ===
Model	Origin	Type	Quantity	Details
Telehjälm 9	Sweden	CVC helmet	Unknown	
Telehjälm 17	Sweden	CVC helmet	Unknown	Successor to Telehjälm 9.
Hjälm 18	United States	Ballistic helmet	2,000 (Note: Originally planned to replace the Hjälm 90, after 2000 units were delivered, the price per unit was considered too high for full implementation and thus cancelled.)	In very limited use.
Hjälm 24	United States	Ballistic helmet	Unknown	Successor to Hjälm 18.
Hjälm 90	Norway	Composite helmet	Unknown	Most common helmet.

=== Masks ===
Model	Origin	Type	Quantity	Details
Skyddsmask FM54	United Kingdom	CBRN mask	Unknown	
Skyddsmask 90	Sweden	CBRN mask	500,000	

=== Vests ===
Model	Origin	Type	Quantity	Details
Kroppsskydd 12	Germany	Modular vest	Unknown	Standard vest.
Kroppsskydd 22	Germany	Modular vest	Unknown	Updated version of Kroppsskydd 12.
Kroppsskydd 23	United States	Modular vest	Unknown	Specifically for female soldiers.
Kroppsskydd 24	Sweden	Modular vest	40,000	Primarily used by military police.
Kroppsskydd 90	Norway	Ballistic vest	Unknown	Primarily used by conscripts in training.

=== Footwear ===
Model	Origin	Type	Quantity	Details
Marschkänga 24	Turkey	Marching boots	70,000	
Marschkänga 90	Sweden	Marching boots	39,000	
Gummistövlar 90	Canada	Rubber boots	Unknown	

=== Gloves ===
Model	Origin	Type	Quantity	Details
Skyddshandskar 7	Sweden	CBRN gloves	Unknown	
Stridshandskar 90	Sweden	Combat gloves	Unknown	For cold climates.
Stridshandskar 2000	Sweden	Combat gloves	Unknown	

=== Radios ===
Model	Origin	Type	Quantity	Details
Radio 570	Sweden	Radio	Unknown	

== Firearms ==
=== Pistol ===
Model	Origin	Type	Quantity	Details
Pistol 88	Austria	Pistol	Unknown	Standard service pistol. Primarily used by officers.

=== Assault rifles ===
Model	Origin	Type	Quantity	Details
Automatkarbin M4A	United States	Assault rifle	15,000	Interim rifle is in use until sufficient numbers of the Ak 24 have been delivered to replace the Ak 5.
Automatkarbin 5C	Sweden	Assault rifle	39,200	A Swedish improved variant of the FN FNC, of which most were built in Sweden.
Automatkarbin 5D	Sweden	Assault rifle	39,200	A Swedish improved variant of the FN FNC, of which most were built in Sweden.
Automatkarbin 24A	Finland	Assault rifle	7,300	Successor to the Automatkarbin 5.

=== Precision rifles ===
Model	Origin	Type	Quantity	Details
Prickskyttegevär 08	Finland	Sniper rifle	Unknown	Used by the Special Operations Group.
Prickskyttegevär 90	United Kingdom	Sniper rifle	Unknown	
Automatgevär 90	United States	Anti-materiel rifle	Unknown	Used to destroy enemy materiel.

=== Shotgun ===
Model	Origin	Type	Quantity	Details
Hagelgevär 686	Italy	Shotgun	Unknown	
Förstärkningsgevär 870 C	United States	Shotgun	Unknown	
Hagelgevär 11-87	United States	Shotgun	Unknown	

=== Support weapons ===
Model	Origin	Type	Quantity	Details
Kulspruta 39	Sweden	Machine gun	Unknown	Coaxial on the Stridsfordon 9040 A and B.
Kulspruta 58	Belgium	Machine gun	Unknown	
Kulspruta 88	United States	Machine gun	Unknown	Primarily used on Terrängbil 16.
Kulspruta 90	Belgium	Machine gun	Unknown	
Kulspruta 94	Germany	Machine gun	Unknown	Mounted on Stridsvagn 122, can be dismounted if needed.
Granatspruta 92	United States	Automatic grenade launcher	Unknown	

== Vehicles ==
=== Main battle tanks ===
Model	Origin	Type	Quantity	Details
Stridsvagn 122A	Germany; Sweden	Main battle tank	96 (-96 to leave service) (Note: 120 units were originally acquired, 14 were rebuilt into the B-version and 10 were donated to Ukraine in 2023.)	A Swedish improved variant of the Leopard 2A5, of which most were built in Sweden.
Stridsvagn 122B	Germany; Sweden	Main battle tank	14 (-14 to leave service)	A Swedish improved variant of the Leopard 2A5, of which most were built in Sweden.
Stridsvagn 123A	Germany; Sweden	Main battle tank	1 (+109 to enter service)	110 Strv 122 to be upgraded to modern Leopard 2 standards. First tank delivered in June 2026.
Stridsvagn 123B	Germany; Sweden	Main battle tank	0 (+44 on order)	Swedish designation for the Leopard 2A8. First delivery expected 2028.

=== Infantry fighting vehicles ===
Model	Origin	Type	Quantity	Details
Stridsfordon 9035	Sweden	Infantry fighting vehicle	0 (+50 on order)	Modernized variant with a 35mm main armament.
Stridsfordon 9040A	Sweden	Infantry fighting vehicle	224 (Note: A total of 355 units were initially acquired, with some repurposed for other needs and 50 donated to Ukraine. UN Register of Conventional Arms 2023 report lists 224 operational units.)	The domestic production variant of the Combat Vehicle 90 with a 40mm armament. Will be modified and are planned to kept in service until the mid 2040s.
Stridsfordon 9040B	Sweden	Infantry fighting vehicle	224	The domestic production variant of the Combat Vehicle 90 with a 40mm armament. Will be modified and are planned to kept in service until the mid 2040s.

=== Armored personnel carriers ===
Model	Origin	Type	Quantity	Details
Pansarterrängbil 180	Finland	Armoured personnel carrier	34	Finnish-produced Sisu XA-180S armed with Ksp 88.
Pansarterrängbil 202	Finland	Armoured personnel carrier	20	
Pansarterrängbil 203	Finland	Armoured personnel carrier	148	
Pansarterrängbil 300	Finland	Armoured personnel carrier	20 (+415 on order) (Note: 20 were originally acquired in 2023, and an order of another 321 was placed in 2024. Further order of 94 placed in December 2025 (to be delivered by 2030).)	Adopted in 2023.
Pansarterrängbil 360	Finland	Armoured personnel carrier	112	Finnish produced Patria XA-360 AMV.

=== Utility vehicles ===
Model	Origin	Type	Quantity	Details
Terrängbil 14	Germany	Armoured utility vehicle	435 (Note: 355 normal units and 80 prototypes for reconnaissance.)	Mercedes-Benz G-Class 4x4.
Terrängbil 15	Germany	Armoured utility vehicle	151	Mercedes-Benz G-Class 6x6.
Terrängbil 16	South Africa	MRAP	380	
Terrängbil 24	Finland	MRAP	20 (+more on order)	Multirole vehicle. Successor to Terrängbil 16. Order in November 2025 in common with Finland for over 300 vehicles (split unknown), deliveries 2026-28.
Motorcykel 251	Japan	Motorcycle	1000	
Motorcykel 409	Austria	Motorcycle	Unknown	Primarily used as couriers within military units.
Motorcykel 810	Germany	Motorcycle	100	Exclusively used by military police.
Polisbil V90	Sweden	Police car	Unknown	Exclusively used by military police.

=== All-terrain vehicles ===
Model	Origin	Type	Quantity	Details
Bandvagn 206	Sweden	Tracked all-terrain vehicle	4,500	
Bandvagn 309	Sweden	Armoured tracked all-terrain vehicle	93 (Note: The majority of 50 units are specialized in troop transport whilst the rest has other miscellaneous specializations.)	
Bandvagn 410	Sweden	Armoured tracked all-terrain vehicle	167 (+236)	

=== Command vehicles ===
Model	Origin	Type	Quantity	Details
Stridsledningspansarbandvagn 90A	Sweden	Armoured command vehicle	54	Used by battalion commanders to lead mechanized battles.
Stridsledningspansarbandvagn 90C	Sweden	Armoured command vehicle	2	Used by battalion commanders to lead mechanized battles.

=== Logistical vehicles ===
Model	Origin	Type	Quantity	Details
Flaklastbil 6T 4x4	Sweden	Flatbed truck	120	
Flaklastbil 7T 8x2	Sweden	Flatbed truck	8	
Skåplastbil 8T 4x2	Sweden	Box truck	40	
Flaklastbil 12T 6x6	Sweden	Flatbed truck	30	
Rullflakslastbil 12T 8x6	Sweden	Hook lift truck	35	
Skåplastbil 13T 6x6	Sweden	Box truck	80	
Rullflaksbil 14T 8x8	Germany	Hook lift truck	107	
Rullflakslastbil 14T 6x4	Sweden	Hook lift truck	200	
Rullflakslastbil 14T 6x6	Sweden	Hook lift truck	125	
Växelbil 16T 6x2	Sweden	Relief truck	3	
Rullflakslastbil 17T 8x4	Sweden	Hook lift truck	12	
Dragbil 23T 6x6	Sweden	Tow truck	Unknown	
Dragbil 28T 8x4	Sweden	Tow truck	6	

=== Engineering vehicles ===
Model	Origin	Type	Quantity	Details
Djupminröjmaskin 1T	Finland	Mine clearing vehicle	Unknown	
Truppminröjare 1B	Croatia	Mine clearing vehicle	4	Unmanned mine clearing vehicle.
Bandschaktare 18T	United States	Armoured bulldozer	Unknown	Exclusively used by the Göta Engineer Regiment.
Hjullastare 18T	Sweden	Armoured wheel loader	Unknown	Widely used among the artillery regiments.
Bärgningsbandvagn 90	Sweden	Armoured recovery vehicle	24	Recovery variant of the CV90.
Brobandvagn 120	Germany	Armoured vehicle-launched bridge	6	
Bärgningsbandvagn 120	Germany	Armoured recovery vehicle	2 (Note: 12 more units are in storage.)	
Ingenjörbandvagn 120	Germany	Armoured engineering vehicle	6	
SKORPION2	Germany	Mine laying system		

== Field artillery ==
=== Howitzers ===
Model	Origin	Type	Quantity	Details
Artillerisystem 08	Sweden	Self-propelled howitzer	26 6x6 4 8x8 (+62 on order)	Of the original 48 6x6 units acquired, 14 6x6s were sold to the United Kingdom, and 8 6x6s were donated to Ukraine, leaving 26 6x6 units in Swedish service. In 2023 an order for 48 new 8x8 units for the artillery regiment was placed. In 2025 additional 18 8x8s were odered. First 4 new 8x8s were delivered in August 2026.

=== Mortars ===
Model	Origin	Type	Quantity	Details
Granatkastarpansarbandvagn 90	Sweden	Self-propelled mortar	40 (+40 on order)	A total of 80 vehicles are planned.

=== Forward observer equipment ===
Model	Origin	Type	Quantity	Details
Eldledningsvagn 90A	Sweden	Forward observation vehicle	34	Used in forward observation for artillery, close air support and naval support.
Eldledningsvagn 90C	Sweden	Forward observation vehicle	8	Used in forward observation for artillery, close air support and naval support.

=== Counter-battery radars ===
Model	Origin	Type	Quantity	Details
Artillerilokaliseringsradarbandvagn 2091	Sweden	Counter-battery radar	Unknown	Based on the Bandvagn 208 chassis.

== Air defence ==
=== Missile systems ===
Model	Origin	Type	Quantity	Details
Robotsystem 23	Sweden	Surface-to-air missile system	Unknown	
Robotsystem 97	United States	Surface-to-air missile system	Unknown	
Robotsystem 98	Germany	Surface-to-air missile system	Unknown	
Luftvärnssystem 103	United States	Surface-to-air missile system	4	Used for the general defence of Swedish airspace.

=== Hand-held missile systems ===
Model	Origin	Type	Quantity	Details
Robotsystem 70	Sweden	Man-portable air-defense system	Unknown	
Robotsystem 102	Poland	Man-portable air-defense system	Unknown	

=== Anti-aircraft artillery ===
Model	Origin	Type	Quantity	Details
Luftvärnskanonvagn 90	Sweden	Self-propelled anti-aircraft gun	30	Strf 9040 with a PS-95 radar.

=== Reconnaissance radars ===
Model	Origin	Type	Quantity	Details
Underrättelseenhet 23	Sweden	Reconnaissance Radar	Unknown	Primary reconnaissance radar of the Swedish Army.

== Anti-armour ==
=== Recoilless rifles ===
Model	Origin	Type	Quantity	Details
Granatgevär 18	Sweden	Recoilless rifle	Unknown	
Pansarskott 86	Sweden	Recoilless rifle	Unknown	

=== Anti-tank missiles ===
Model	Origin	Type	Quantity	Details
Robotsystem 55	United States	Anti-tank missile	Unknown	
Robotsystem 56	Sweden	Anti-tank missile	Unknown	
Robotsystem 57	Sweden	Anti-tank missile	Unknown	
Robotsystem 58	France	Anti-tank missile	Unknown	

== Explosives ==
=== Grenades ===
Model	Origin	Type	Quantity	Details
Spränghandgranat 07	Sweden	Hand grenade	Unknown	
Spränghandgranat 56	Sweden	Hand grenade	Unknown	
Chockhandgranat 96	Sweden	Hand grenade	Unknown	
Spränghandgranat 2000	France	Hand grenade	Unknown	

=== Landmines ===
Model	Origin	Type	Quantity	Details
Larmmina 1	Sweden	Alarm mine	Unknown	Used to alarm soldiers of an incoming enemy.
Larmmina 2	Sweden	Alarm mine	Unknown	Used to alarm soldiers of an incoming enemy.
Stridsvagnsmina 5	Sweden	Anti-tank mine	Unknown	
Stridsvagnsmina 6	Sweden	Anti-tank mine	Unknown	
Fordonsmina 13	Sweden	Anti-vehicle mine	Unknown	
Fordonsmina 14	Sweden	Anti-vehicle mine	Unknown	
Försvarsladdning 21	United States	Anti-personnel mine	Unknown	Command activated landmine that complies with the Ottawa Treaty.
Försvarsladdning 22	Sweden	Anti-personnel mine	Unknown	Command activated landmine that complies with the Ottawa Treaty.

== Aircraft ==
=== Drones ===
Model	Origin	Type	Quantity	Details
UAV 03	United States	Unmanned aerial vehicle	Unknown	Used for heavy reconnaissance.
UAV 04	United States	Unmanned aerial vehicle	Unknown	
UAV 05	United States	Unmanned aerial vehicle	Unknown	
UAV 06	France	Unmanned aerial vehicle	Unknown	Used for light reconnaissance.

== See also ==
- Current equipment in the Swedish Armed Forces
  - Swedish Armed Forces:
    - List of equipment of the Swedish Armed Forces
  - Swedish Air Force:
    - Current fleet of the Swedish Air Force
    - List of equipment of the Swedish Air Force
    - Weapons of the Swedish Air Force
    - List of military aircraft of Sweden
  - Swedish Navy:
    - List of active ships of the Swedish Navy
    - List of equipment of the Swedish Navy
  - Swedish Home Guard:
    - List of equipment of the Swedish Home Guard
  - Swedish Coast Guard:
    - Swedish Coast Guard ships
    - Swedish Coast Guard aviation
- Military equipment of Sweden during World War II
- Military equipment of Sweden during the Cold War

== Sources ==
- DigitaltMuseum (12 May 2023). "Telehjälm 9". digitaltmuseum.se (in Swedish).
- L. R., Henrik (2020). "En i gänget: Prins Carl Philip stöttar i krisen" (PDF). Försvarets Forum (in Swedish). No. 4.
- Svensk, Henrik (2019a). "Hjälm 18A". SoldF.com (in Swedish).
- FMV (29 Nov 2023a). "Nya stridshjälmar till Försvarsmakten". fmv.se (in Swedish).
- Försvarsmakten (2023). "Verksamhetssäkerhet – Spräng- och tändmedel" (PDF). Reglemente (in Swedish). Stockholm: Swedish Armed Forces.
