= List of equipment of the Swedish Home Guard =

The military equipment of the Swedish Home Guard includes only a narrow array of arms, vehicles, mortars and launchers. Majority of these are retired equipment from the Swedish Army whilst the minority is acquired especially for them.

== Small arms and light weapons ==
Model	Swedish designation	Image	Origin	Type	Calibre	Quantity	Notes
Handguns
Glock 17 (Gen 1)	Pist 88; Pistol 88		Austria; Sweden	Semi-automatic pistol	9×19mm Parabellum	Unknown	Standard-issue sidearm, in the homeguard.
Glock 17 (Gen 2)	Pist 88 C Pistol 88 C		Austria; Sweden	Semi-automatic pistol	9×19mm Parabellum	Unknown	Standard-issue sidearm, in the homeguard.
Glock 17 (Gen 3)	Pist 88 C2; Pistol 88 C2		Austria; Sweden	Semi-automatic pistol	9×19mm Parabellum	Unknown	Standard-issue sidearm, in the homeguard.
Glock 19 (Gen 2)	Pist 88 B Pistol 88 B		Austria; Sweden	Semi-automatic pistol	9×19mm Parabellum	Unknown	Standard-issue sidearm, in the homeguard.
Glock 19 (Gen 2)	Pist 88 D Pistol 88 D		Austria; Sweden	Semi-automatic pistol	9×19mm Parabellum	Unknown	Standard-issue sidearm, in the homeguard.
Assault & battle rifles
Heckler & Koch G3A3	Ak 4 C Automatkarbin 4 C		Sweden (under licence); Germany	Battle rifle	7.62×51mm NATO	Unknown	Standard issue rifle in the Homeguard, all modified from the B variant with a new stock. One accessory is the Aimpoint CS.
Machine guns
FN MAG	Ksp 58 B Kulspruta 58 B		Belgium	General purpose machine gun	7.62×51mm NATO	Unknown	Standard issue support weapon.
Anti-tank weapons
AT4	Pskott 86; Pansarskott 86		Sweden	Recoilless guns	84 mm	Unknown	
Carl Gustaf M2	Grg 48 C Granatgevär 48C		Sweden	Recoilless rifle	84 mm	Unknown	

== Vehicles ==
Model	Swedish designation	Image	Origin	Type	Quantity	Notes
All-terrain vehicles
Bandvagn 206	Bv 206D		Sweden	Tracked articulated vehicle	Unknown	Inherited from the Army in the 2000s.
Utility vehicles
Mercedes-Benz Sprinter 316 4×4	PB 8 "Personbil 8"		Germany; Sweden	Utility van / passenger transport	260 to 400 (unclear quantity, at least 40 of the platoon command vehicle)	Successor of the Tgb 11 and the Tgb 20, delivered from 2014 to 2016, modified by Abicon for the Home Guard. The common equipment includes: Radio Ra 4183 (Motorola GM3688); Radio Ra 1444; The Specific equipment for each variant includes: Passenger variant: 9 seats, (8 passengers + 1 dog handler) and a dog cage; Command variant: command consoles
Mercedes-Benz Sprinter 316 4×4	PB 8 "Personbil 8"		Germany; Sweden	Platoon command vehicle	260 to 400 (unclear quantity, at least 40 of the platoon command vehicle)	Successor of the Tgb 11 and the Tgb 20, delivered from 2014 to 2016, modified by Abicon for the Home Guard. The common equipment includes: Radio Ra 4183 (Motorola GM3688); Radio Ra 1444; The Specific equipment for each variant includes: Passenger variant: 9 seats, (8 passengers + 1 dog handler) and a dog cage; Command variant: command consoles
Ford Ranger - XL - 2024 - double cab	—	—	United States	Pick-up utility vehicle	Unknown	It entered service in 2024. Specifications: 4×4, 170 hp, 6-speed automatic, high/low gear, hardtop
Logistics vehicles
Scania P 310 B4×2NA	Skåpbil 8T	—	Sweden	Box truck	40	
Scania 124C 360 (6×4) / Scania 124C 420 (8×4/8)	—		Sweden	Tactical truck	Unknown	
Motorcyvles
Husqvarna Model 258	MC 258 "Motorcykel 258"		Austria	Dual-sport motorcycle	Unknown	The motorcycles are operated by MC-ordonnans (a motorcycle courrier).
KTM 400 LS-E/mil	MC 409 "Motorcykel 409"		Sweden	Dual-sport motorcycle	Unknown	The motorcycles are operated by MC-ordonnans (a motorcycle courrier).
BMW F800 GS	MC 810 "Motorcykel 810"		Germany	Dual-sport motorcycle	100 (for entire military)	The motorcycles are operated by MC-ordonnans (a motorcycle courrier).

== Boats ==
Model	Swedish designation	Image	Origin	Type	Quantity	Notes
—	Trossbåt 600		Sweden	Logistics, resupply for combat units	1	Used by the Amphibious Corps and can be used by the Home Guard.
Storebro SB90E	Stridsbåt 90E		Sweden	Fast attack boat	1	
Watercat M8 (Marine Alutech)	Gruppbåt class		Finland	Landing craft (fast troop transport over water bodies)	Unknown	Used by the Amphibious Corps and can be used by the Home Guard.

== Electronic equipment ==
=== Surveillance equipment ===
Model	Swedish designation	Image	Origin	Type	Quantity	Notes
Bertin-Exensor Flexnet UGS; Unattended Ground Sensors	TMM "Taktiskt Modulart Marksensorsystem" (Tactical modular ground sensor system)	—	Sweden	Suite of ground sensors, and data transmission systems	Unknown	Includes: Rugged laptop; Tablet; Bertin Exensor Gateway; Bertin Exensor PIR (Passive infrared sensor); Bertin Exensor Scout Mk3 (Intelligent remote imager); Bertin Exensor Mini Mk3 (wireless, seismic and acoustic sensor)

=== Communications equipment ===
Model	Swedish designation	Image	Origin	Type	Quantity	Notes
Sepura STP8000	Ra 1444		United Kingdom	Hand-portable rugged radio	Unknown	Used with the vehicle PB 8 ("Personbil 8").
Sepura SRG3900	Ra 5444		United Kingdom	Radio gateway and repeater	Unknown	
Motorola GM3688	Ra 4183	Illustration	United States	Mobile Two way Radio UHF / VHF	Unknown	Used with the vehicle PB 8 ("Personbil 8").

== Unmanned aerial vehicles ==
Model	Swedish designation	Image	Origin	Type	Role	Quantity	Notes
Parrot ANAFI USA GOV	UAV 06 A (Skatan); Unmanned aerial vehicle		France	Mini quadcopter UAV; Unmanned aerial vehicle	ISR; Intelligence, surveillance, and reconnaissance	Unknown	Equipment: optical camera with 1 - 32 × zoom; IR camera, resolution of 320×256 pixels.

== Personal equipment ==
Model	Swedish designation	Image	Origin	Type	Quantity	Notes
Clothing
Field Uniform 90	Fältjacka 90		Sweden (fabric); Sri Lanka (production)	Field jacket	Unknown	
Field Uniform 90	Fältbyxa 90		Sweden (fabric); Sri Lanka (production)	Field trousers	Unknown	
Field Uniform 90	Värmejacka 90		Sweden (fabric); Sri Lanka (production)	Thermal jacket	Unknown	
Field Uniform 90	Snökläder 90		Sweden (fabric); Sri Lanka (production)	Snow gears	Unknown	
Field Uniform 90	Regnställ 90		Belgium	Rain gears	Unknown	
Field Uniform 90	Marschkänga 90		Sweden; Finland	Combat boots	Unknown	
Field Uniform 90	Vinterkänga 90		Sweden; Finland	Winter boots	Unknown	
Field Uniform 90	Gummistövel 90		Finland	Rubber boots	Unknown	
Field Uniform 90	Fältskjorta 90	—	Sweden	Pullover	Unknown	
Field Uniform 90	T-shirt 90	—	Sweden	T-shirt	Unknown	
Field Uniform 90	Tröja 90	—	Sweden	Sweater	Unknown	
—	Handskar, vantar	—	—	Gloves / mittens	Unknown	
Carinthia	Sovsäck 2000	—	Austria	3-season sleeping bag	Unknown	
Combat base equipment
—	SS 2000; Stridssäck 2000	—	Sweden	Battle back pack	Unknown	
—	Bärsäck 2000	—	Sweden	Carry bag	Unknown	
—	Persedelpåse m/91	—	Sweden	Purse bag	Unknown	
Mess kit	Dricksflaska	—	—	Bottle	Unknown	
Mess kit	Termos	—	—	Thermos	Unknown	
Mess kit	Kåsa	—	—	Mug	Unknown	
Mess kit	Matbestick	—	—	Cutlery	Unknown	
Optimus Crux	Soldatkök 09/10 with Enmanskök and Kokkärl m/40	—	—	Campstove	Unknown	
—	Vätskebehållare	Illustration	Israel	Drinking pouch	Unknown	
3M Peltor ComTac XP	Hörselkåpa Comtac XP	Illustration	United States	Shooting hearing protection	Unknown	

== Future equipment ==
=== Vehicles ===
Model	Swedish designation	Image	Origin	Type	Quantity	Notes
Iveco MUV	LMPV - Communication Home Guard; Light Multi-Purpose Vehicle	Illustration	Italy; Sweden	Utility van / communications	Unknown	One of the variant of the 400 Iveco MUV ordered, and 3,000 vehicles planned.

== See also ==
List of equipment of the Swedish Armed Forces

- Swedish Army:
  - List of equipment of the Swedish Army
- Swedish Air Force
  - Current fleet of the Swedish Air Force
  - List of equipment of the Swedish Air Force
  - Weapons of the Swedish Air Force
  - List of military aircraft of Sweden
- Swedish Navy
  - List of active ships of the Swedish Navy
  - List of equipment of the Swedish Navy
- Swedish Coast Guard:
  - Swedish Coast Guard ships
  - Swedish Coast Guard aviation
