= List of equipment of the Swedish Air Force =

This is a list of equipment used by the Swedish Air Force, the branch of the Armed Forces of the Sweden that specialises in aerial warfare. It covers active equipment, such as aircraft and ordnance.

== Aircraft ==
=== Fixed wing aircraft ===
Model	Swedish designation	Image	Origin	Type	Quantity	Notes
Combat aircraft
JAS 39 Gripen	JAS 39C		Sweden	Swingrole fighter	71	A total fleet of 120 Gripen C/D/E planned. 60 Gripen E ordered. 12 more planned to be ordered as of July 2026.
JAS 39 Gripen	JAS 39E		Sweden	Swingrole fighter	2 (+ 58 on order)	A total fleet of 120 Gripen C/D/E planned. 60 Gripen E ordered. 12 more planned to be ordered as of July 2026.
JAS 39 Gripen	JAS 39D		Sweden	Conversion trainer	23	
Surveillance aircraft
Gulfstream IV SIGINT	S 102B GIV-SP Korpen		Sweden; United States	Signals intelligence aircraft	2	
Saab 340	TP 100 A		Sweden	Treaty on Open Skies agreement - surveillance	1	
Global 6000 - GlobalEye	S 106		Sweden; Canada	Photographic reconnaissance / Open Skies reconnaissance / Transport / liaison	0 (+ 3 on order)	2 ordered in June 2022 with option for 2 more orders. 1 ordered in June 2024. One handed over and will undergo flight testing before the planned delivery in 2027.
Aerial refueling
Lockheed Martin KC-130	TP 84		United States	Aerial refueling	1	
Military Transport
Lockheed C-130E Hercules	TP 84		United States	Tactical airlifter	5	To be replaced by Embraer C-390.
Embraer C-390	–		Brazil	Tactical airlifter	0 (+ 4 on order)	4 planes ordered.
Saab 340	TP 100 C		Sweden	VIP transport	1	Up to 31 passengers.
Gulfstream IV	TP 102 C		United States	VIP transport	1	
Gulfstream G550	TP102 D		United States	VIP transport	1	Up to 15 passengers.
Global 6500	TP 106		Canada	VIP transport	2	Successor to the TP 102 C and D. Two aircraft delivered 1 jun 2026. (Aircraft bought second-hand)
Trainer aircraft
Grob G 120TP	SK 40		Germany	Ab initio flight trainer	13	

==== Co-owned fixed-wing aircraft ====
Model	Swedish designation	Operators	Image	Origin	Type	Quantity	Notes
Aerial refueling
Airbus A330 MRTT	–	MMF; Multinational MRTT Fleet Belgium; Czech Republic; Denmark; Finland; Germany; Luxembourg; Netherlands; Norway; Sweden		Spain; United Kingdom; France; Germany	Aerial refueling	9 (shared) (+ 3 on order)	12 co-owned and shared planes within the Multinational MRTT Fleet.
Military Transport
Boeing C-17	–	SAC; Strategic Airlift Capability Bulgaria; Estonia; Finland; Hungary; Lithuania; Netherlands; Norway; Poland; Romania; Slovenia; Sweden; United States		United States	Heavy airlifter	3 (shared)	3 co-owned and shared planes within the Heavy Airlift Wing.

=== Helicopter ===
Helicopters operated by the Swedish Armed Forces Helicopter Wing (Försvarsmaktens helikopterflottilj), a wing of the Swedish Air Force.

Model	Swedish designation	Image	Origin	Type	Quantity	Notes
AgustaWestland AW109	HKP 15A		Italy	Utility helicopter	12	
AgustaWestland AW109	HKP 15B		Italy	Naval utility helicopter	8	
NHIndustries NH90 TTH HCV	HKP 14E		Assembly:Finland; Design and suppliers: France; Germany; Italy; Netherlands	Transport helicopter	9	Higher cabin variant.
NHIndustries NH90 TTH HCV	HKP 14F		Assembly:Finland; Design and suppliers: France; Germany; Italy; Netherlands	ASW helicopter	9	Higher cabin variant.
Sikorsky BlackHawk UH-60M	HKP 16		United States	Transport helicopter	15 (+12 on order)	15 in service being upgraded since 2023. 12 more ordered in July 2024.

=== Unmanned aerial vehicle ===
Model	Swedish designation	Image	Origin	Type	Quantity	Notes
AAI RQ-7B Shadow 200	UAV 03 Örnen		United States	ISTAR UAV	8	Purchased in 2010, 2 systems with 4 drones each.
AeroVironment Wasp III	UAV 04 Svalan		United States	Fixed-wing surveillance UAV (0.5 kg)	3	Surveillance drones purchased in 2012 for the missions in Mali and Afghanistan.
AeroVironment RQ-20 Puma	UAV 05B Korpen		United States	Fixed-wing surveillance UAV (5 kg)	12	Surveillance drones purchased in 2012 for the missions in Mali and Afghanistan.
Elbit Skylark	UAV 02 Falken		Israel	Fixed-wing surveillance UAV	48	48 ordered in 2007.

== Satellites ==
Model	Swedish designation	Image	Origin	Type	Quantity	Notes
ICEYE	–		Finland	SAR satellite	10	Ordered in January 2026, deliveries between 2026 and 2028.
Planet Labs	–		United States	LEO - high resolution imagery satellite	Unknown quantity	The Swedish Armed Forces signed a contract in 2026 to "own a suite of Planet’s cutting-edge satellites, and have access to Planet’s high-resolution data, and intelligence solutions".

== Ordnance ==
Model	Swedish designation	Image	Origin	Type	Quantity	Notes
Canons
Mauser BK-27	–		Germany	Revolver cannon (27×145 mm rounds)	Unknown	Gun of the Gripen C/E.
Air-to-air missiles
MBDA Meteor	Rb 101		United Kingdom; Germany; France; Italy; Spain; Sweden	BVR, radar homing, air-to-air missile	Unknown	Used by the Gripen C/D since 2016, and will be used with the E. First order, 2010. Second order, 2025.
IRIS-T	Rb 98		Germany; Italy; Sweden; Greece; Norway; Spain	IR homing, short range air-to-air missile	Unknown	
AIM-120B	Rb.99		United States; Sweden	BVR, radar homing, air-to-air missile	Unknown	Local licence production of this variant. Some transferred to Ukraine.
AIM-120 C8	Rb.99		United States	BVR, radar homing, air-to-air missile	250	Ordered in 2023.
Air-to-surface missiles
AGM-65B Maverick	Rb.75		United States; Sweden	Air-to-ground tactical missile	Unknown	
RBS 15 Mk1	RBS-15F		Sweden	Anti-ship, air-to-surface cruise missile	Unknown	
RBS-15 Mk4 Gungir	–	–	Sweden	Anti-ship and land attack, air-to-surface cruise missile	0	Contract for its development, to enter service in the 2020s.
Taurus KEPD 350	–		Germany; Sweden	Land attack, air-to-surface cruise missile	0 (+ unknown quantity on order)	To be delivered in 2028.
Bombs
GBU-12 Paveway II	–		United States	Bomb guidance kit	Unknown	
GBU-49 Paveway II	–		United States	Bomb guidance kit	Unknown	
Mark 82	–		Italy	Unguided bomb	Unknown	
Pods
Terma SPK 39	–		Denmark	Reconnaissance pod	Unknown	
Rafael / Zeiss Litening 3	–		Israel; Germany	Targeting pod	Unknown	
Rafael Litening 5	–		Israel	Targeting pod	Unknown	Ordered in 2024.
Mount / rail for jet fighter
Saab Universal Missile Rail Launcher	–	–	Sweden	Pylon for jet fighter (for weapons and countermeasures)	Unknown	

== Radars ==
Model	Swedish designation	Image	Origin	Type	Quantity	Notes
Reconnaissance vehicles
ITT GCA-2000 ATC AN/MPN-25 MACS	–	(illustration)	United States	Mobile ATC radar	1	Ordered in 2006, delivered in 2007.

== Air force vehicles ==
Model	Swedish designation	Image	Origin	Type	Quantity	Notes
Reconnaissance vehicles
Mercedes-Benz G-Class W461	Tgb 15; Terrängbil 15		Australia; Germany	6×6 reconnaissance vehicles	90	90 ordered in 2020, delivered from 2021 to the air force.
Command vehicles
VW T6	–		Germany	4×4 vehicle	28	Liaison and command vehicle of the Air Force.
VW Crafter	–		Germany	4×4 vehicle	28	Liaison and command vehicle of the Air Force.
Refuelling vehicles
Scania G440	–		Sweden	Aircraft fuel truck	–	
HMK Bilcon Volvo	–	–	Denmark; Sweden	Aircraft fuel truck + trailer	–	Truck capacity: 21 m^{3} (5,500 US gal).
Emergency vehicles
Volvo FM480	Räddningsbil 926 typ I	(illustration, green, water cannon on roof)	Sweden	Crash tender - 6×6	–	It entered service in 2007, and replaced the Rtgb 4112. Crash tender made by Volvo Autokaross Rescue Systems. Equipment: Water tank: 7.4 m^{3} (2,000 US gal); Foam tank: 230 L (61 US gal); Powder: 150 L (40 US gal); Water canon
Rosenbauer Buffalo / Scania P500XT 6×6	Räddningsbil typ II	(illustration, green)	Sweden; Austria	Crash tender - 6×6	22 (+22 on order)	Manufactured by Rosenbauer International AG, and Sala Brand, 22 Type II rescue vehicles ordered in 2023, in service since 2024. Option exercised in January 2026 for 22 additional trucks. Equipment: Water tank: 5.4 m^{3} (1,400 US gal); Foam tank: 350 L (92 US gal); Powder: 255 L (67 US gal); Water canon
Chevrolet C/K 3500 (chassis 30943 with Crew cab)	Räddningsbil 397 typ III	(illustration with predecessor)	United States; Sweden	Light crash tender - 4×4	–	In service since 1997. Made by Anders Wiman AB. Equipment: Water tank: 0.5 m^{3} (130 US gal); Foam tank: 20 L (5.3 US gal); Water canon
Scania P114C 340	RÄ-bil BAS3; Räddningsbil BAS3	(illustration, green)	Sweden	Fire engine - 4×4	–	Fire engine made by Autokaross Rescue System Floby AB. Equipment: Water tank: 3 m^{3} (790 US gal); Foam tank: 0.4 m^{3} (110 US gal); Hydraulic winch
Utility vehicles
Corvus UTV	–	(illustration)	Spain	Utility vehicles	0 (+64 on order)	Electric UTV ordered in January 2025 for €3 million, with options that could bring the value of the contract to €5.4 million)
Support vehicles
Valtra N163	–	–	Finland	Tractor	7	
Valtra N174	Hjultraktor Tung 7T		Finland	Tractor	30	

== Planned investments ==
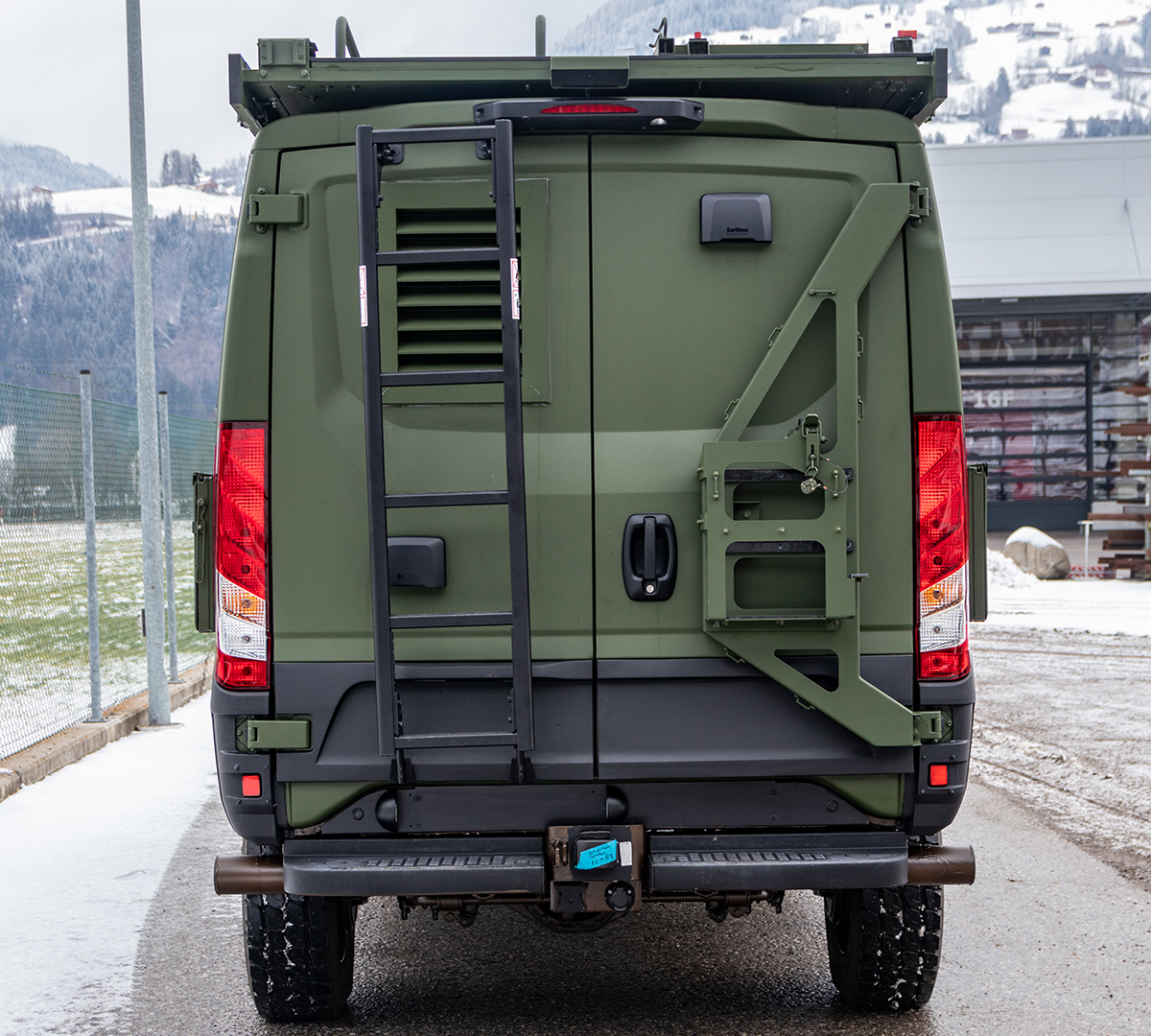
Iveco IDV MUV (illustration of a communication variant)

=== Aircraft ===
- Research ongoing for the jet fighter force after 2040.
- Potential combat drone collaboration with Germany.

=== Weapons ===
- Anti radiation missiles to be introduced between 2031 and 2035.

=== Vehicles ===
- Iveco MUV, variant planned to be ordered under a framework agreement for the Swedish Armed Forces signed in 2023

== See also ==
List of equipment of the Swedish Armed Forces

- Swedish Air Force:
  - Current fleet of the Swedish Air Force
  - Weapons of the Swedish Air Force
  - List of military aircraft of Sweden
- Swedish Army:
  - List of equipment of the Swedish Army
- Swedish Navy:
  - List of active ships of the Swedish Navy
  - List of equipment of the Swedish Navy
- Swedish Home Guard:
  - List of equipment of the Swedish Home Guard
- Swedish Coast Guard:
  - Swedish Coast Guard ships
  - Swedish Coast Guard aviation
