= Swedish Air Force weapons =

== Designating a weapon ==
Most weapons were designated by an abbreviation prefix followed by a model designation of m/xx, the digits normally being the last two digits of the weapon's year of introduction to service. Missiles were designated with two digits after the "Rb" designation, which is short for "Robot", the Swedish word for missile. With air-to-air missiles odd numbers indicated radar seekers like the Rb 71 or Sky Flash, even numbers indicate IR seekers like the Rb 98 or IRIS-T off-boresight air-to-air missile.

The abbreviations used for some weapons are derived from the type of weapon, arak being short for "attack rocket", and akan being short for "automatic cannon".

== Abbreviations ==
Swedish materiel abbreviations are used widely in the Swedish armed forces.

- Akan: automatkanon - automatic cannon
- Akankapsel: automatkanonkapsel - lit. automatic cannon capsule, meaning gun pod
- Arak: attackraket - attack rocket
- Rakkaps: raketkapsel - rocket capsule, meaning rocket pod
- Srak: sprängraket - high explosive rocket
- Övnrak: övningsraket - practice rocket

== Air-to-air missiles ==
- Rb 321: Experimental active radar homing missile, meant to arm the J 35 Draken. It never entered production, as the SAF instead opted for Sidewinder and Falcon missiles.

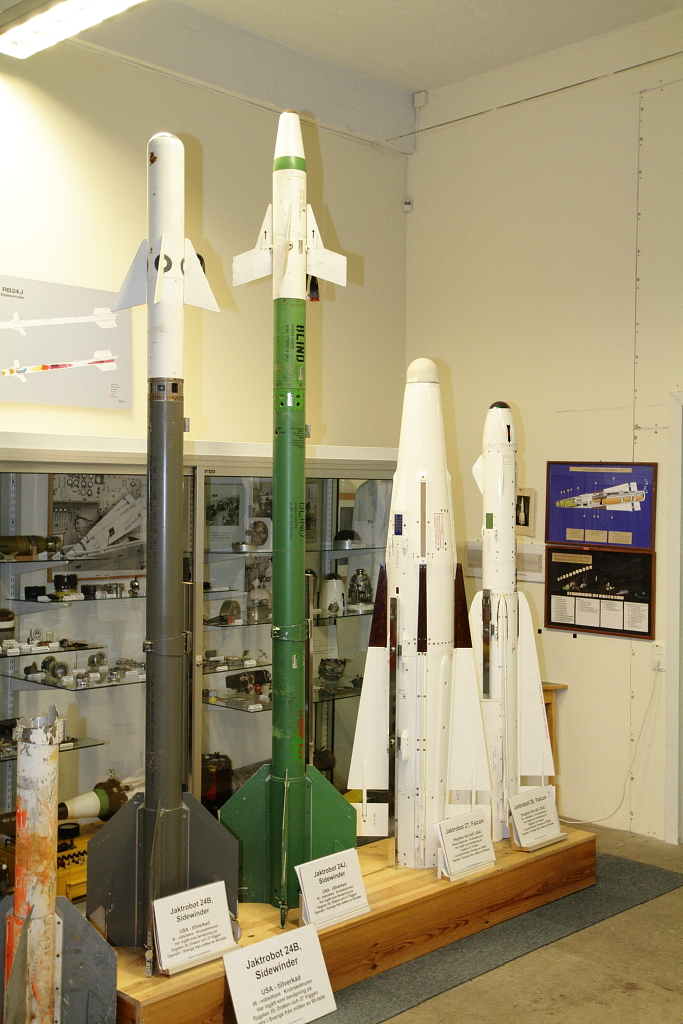
From the left Rb24B, Rb24J, Rb27, Rb28.

- RB 24 Sidewinder: The air force's first operational air-to-air missile. Imported AIM-9B Sidewinder.
- Rb 72: Experimental short and medium range infrared-guided air-to-air missile for the fighter-interceptor JA 37 version of the Saab 37 Viggen ("Jaktviggen").
- RB 24J: Swedish designation of the AIM-9P3 Sidewinder. License-made with a Swedish-designed laser fuze.
- RB 74: Swedish designation of the imported AIM-9L Sidewinder, sometimes called the Rb 24L. Carried by the JA 37 Jaktviggen, the AJS 37 upgrade of the AJ 37 and the JAS 39 Gripen.
- RB 27: A conventional warhead version of the Nuclear Falcon GAR-11A missile using a SARH seeker in Swedish service equipped with new proximity fuze, and used on the J 35F/J Saab Draken.
- RB 28 Hughes Falcon GAR-4 IR seeker in a GAR-2 body.
- RB 71 The British Sky Flash semiactive air-to-air missile, carried by the JA 37 Jaktviggen.
- RB 98: Swedish designation of the IRIS-T air-to-air missile with IR seeking capabilities. Rb98 is also currently in use as a surface-to-air missile.
- RB 99: The US AIM-120 AMRAAM.
- RB 101: The MBDA Meteor in service with the Swedish Air Force since 11 July 2016.

== Air-to-surface missiles ==
- RB 05: A joystick-controlled dual-mode missile developed by Bofors, primarily intended for the AJ 37 Viggen, but also fitted to the Sk 60B. The fuze could be set by the pilot to impact mode for ground targets, or proximity mode for attacking slow air targets such as bombers.
- RB 75: imported AGM-65A Maverick, a TV-guided, fire-and-forget air-to-surface missile. Used both in AGM and AShM roles. Carried by the AJ 37 Viggen and the later AJS 37 variants.
- RB 75T: Swedish domestically modified variant of the RB 75 with heavier warhead. Used in AShM role. The T denotes tung stridsdel, "heavy warhead". Carried by the AJ 37 Viggen and the later AJS 37 variants.

== Anti-ship missiles ==
- Rb 302: experimental anti-ship missile tested 1947-1955.
- Rb 315: anti-ship missile.
- Rb 04: Swedish-built anti-ship missile in use since the early 1960s in C/D/E versions, carried by the A 32A Lansen and AJ 37, AJS 37, SH 37, and ASJH 37 variants of the Viggen.
- Rbs 15F: Air-launched version of the Swedish Rbs 15 anti-ship missile. Carried on the AJS 37 Viggen and JAS 39 Gripen.

== Surface-to-air missiles ==
- Rb 65: Bristol Bloodhound Mk. I surface-to-air missile.
- Rb 67: HAWK surface-to-air missile.
- Rb 68: Bristol Bloodhound Mk. II high-altitude surface-to-air missile.
- Rb 69: Redeye MANPAD.
- RBS 70: short-ranged surface-to-air missile developed by Bofors, laser beamrider.
- Rb 98, as part of Eldenhet 98: short-range infrared surface-to-air system based on the air-launched IRIS-T missile.

== Guns ==
- 20 mm akan m/45: Bofors cannon used on the Saab 21 family of fighter and attacker planes.
- 20 mm akan m/47B: Swedish designation for the Hispano Mk. V cannon, imported and carried on the J 28B, the Swedish-used variant of the de Havilland Vampire.
- 20 mm akan m/47C: Swedish designation for the Hispano Mk. V cannon, but license-made by Bofors for the Saab 29 Tunnan series of jet fighters and attackers.
- 20 mm akan m/49: Bofors cannon used on the A 32A Lansen attacker jet. Based on the earlier akan m/45.
- 30 mm akan m/55: Swedish designation for the ADEN cannon. Used as primary armament on the J 32B Lansen, J 34 Hawker Hunter, and J 35 Draken. Also carried in wing-mounted gunpods under the designation 30 mm akankapsel, carried by the Sk 60B and AJ 37 Attackviggen, as these had no integral guns.
- 30 mm akan m/75: Swedish designation for the Oerlikon KCA. Mounted only on the JA 37 Jaktviggen fighter-interceptor, in an integral conformal pod, carrying 150 rounds of HEI and/or SAPHE ammunition. Inert training ammunition was available for target practice. The 30x173 mm round is among the most powerful ever used in a primary gun on a dedicated fighter plane.
- 27 mm akan m/85: Swedish designation for the Mauser BK-27 27mm autocannon mounted on the JAS 39 Gripen.

== Rockets ==
7,5 cm rockets were carried in 19-rocket pods designated rakkaps m/57, while the 13,5 cm rockets were carried with the 6-rocket pod rakkaps m/70.

- 6,3 cm övnrak m/70 - practice rockets carried by AJ 37, J 35, and SK 60
- 7,5 cm srak m/57 - air-to-air rockets carried by J 35
- 7,5 cm övnrak m/57B - practice rockets, developed from m/57, carried by J 35, AJS 37, and JAS 39
- 13,5 cm srak m/56D - Bofors-made attack rockets, carried by J 35 and Sk 60
- 13,5 cm srak m/70 - Bofors-made attack rockets, carried by Viggen and Gripen; both HEAT, HE, and HEF warheads available
- 14,5 cm srak m 49/56 - attack rockets carried by J 35 and Sk 60; HEAT warhead

== Bombs ==
- 120 kg sb m/71 high explosive bombs made by Bofors
- Mk 82 bomb
- GBU-12 - carried by Gripen

== See also ==
List of equipment of the Swedish Armed Forces

- Swedish Air Force
  - Current fleet of the Swedish Air Force
  - List of equipment of the Swedish Air Force
  - List of military aircraft of Sweden
- Swedish Army:
  - List of equipment of the Swedish Army
- Swedish Navy:
  - List of active ships of the Swedish Navy
  - List of equipment of the Swedish Navy
- Swedish Home Guard:
  - List of equipment of the Swedish Home Guard
- Swedish Coast Guard:
  - Swedish Coast Guard ships
  - Swedish Coast Guard aviation

== Sources ==
- "Bofors 350 år"
- "Viggen" - Sven Stridberg
- "Flygande Tunnan" - Lennart Berns
- "JAS 39 Gripen" - Lindqvist Widfeldt
- "Svenskt Militärflyg" - Bo Vidfeldt / Åke Hall
- "Arboga Robot Museum"
