= Swedish Air Force =

Air warfare branch of Sweden's military

- Flygvapnet
- Coat of arms of the Swedish Air Force
- Founded: 1 July 1926; 100 years ago
- Country: Sweden
- Type: Air force
- Role: Aerial warfare
- Size: 2,700 personnel
- Part of: Swedish Armed Forces
- March: Flygvapnets Defileringsmarsch; (English: "March of the Swedish Air Force"), by Helge Damberg
- Equipment: 207 aircraft
- Engagements: Winter War; Congo Crisis; Afghanistan War; 2011 military intervention in Libya

Commanders
- Chief of Air Force: MajGen Jonas Wikman
- Deputy Chief of Air Force: BGen Tommy Petersson
- Chief of the Air Staff: Col Dennis Hedström
- Notable commanders: Bengt Nordenskiöld

Insignia
- Roundel

Aircraft flown
- Electronic warfare: Saab 340 AEW&C, Gulfstream IV-SP
- Fighter: JAS 39 Gripen
- Helicopter: A109LUH, NH90, UH-60M
- Trainer: Grob G 120TP
- Transport: C-130H Hercules, Saab 340B, Gulfstream IV-SP, Gulfstream G550

The Swedish Air Force (Swedish: Svenska flygvapnet or just Flygvapnet) is the air force branch of the Swedish Armed Forces.

== History ==
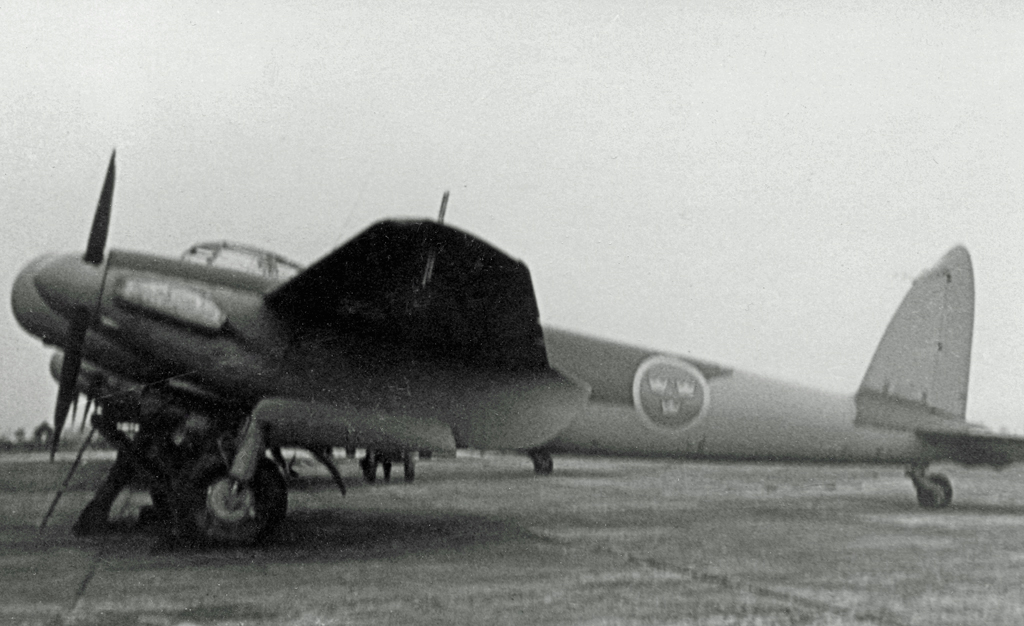
DH.98 Mosquito NF.19 night fighter of the Swedish Air Force in 1949

The Swedish Air Force was created on 1 July 1926 when the aircraft units of the Army and Navy were merged. Because of the escalating international tension during the 1930s the Air Force was reorganized and expanded from four to seven squadrons.

=== World War II ===
When World War II broke out in 1939 further expansion was initiated and this substantial expansion was not finished until the end of the war. Although Sweden never entered the war, a large air force was considered necessary to ward off the threat of invasion and to resist pressure through military threats from the great powers. By 1945 the Swedish Air Force had over 800 combat-ready aircraft, including 15 fighter divisions.

A major problem for the Swedish Air Force during World War II was the lack of fuel. Sweden was surrounded by countries at war and could not rely on imported oil. Instead domestic oil shale was heated to produce the needed petrol.

About 250 aircrew were killed in crashes 1939-1945 according to statistics that were not disclosed during the war years but published afterwards.

=== Expansion during the Cold War ===
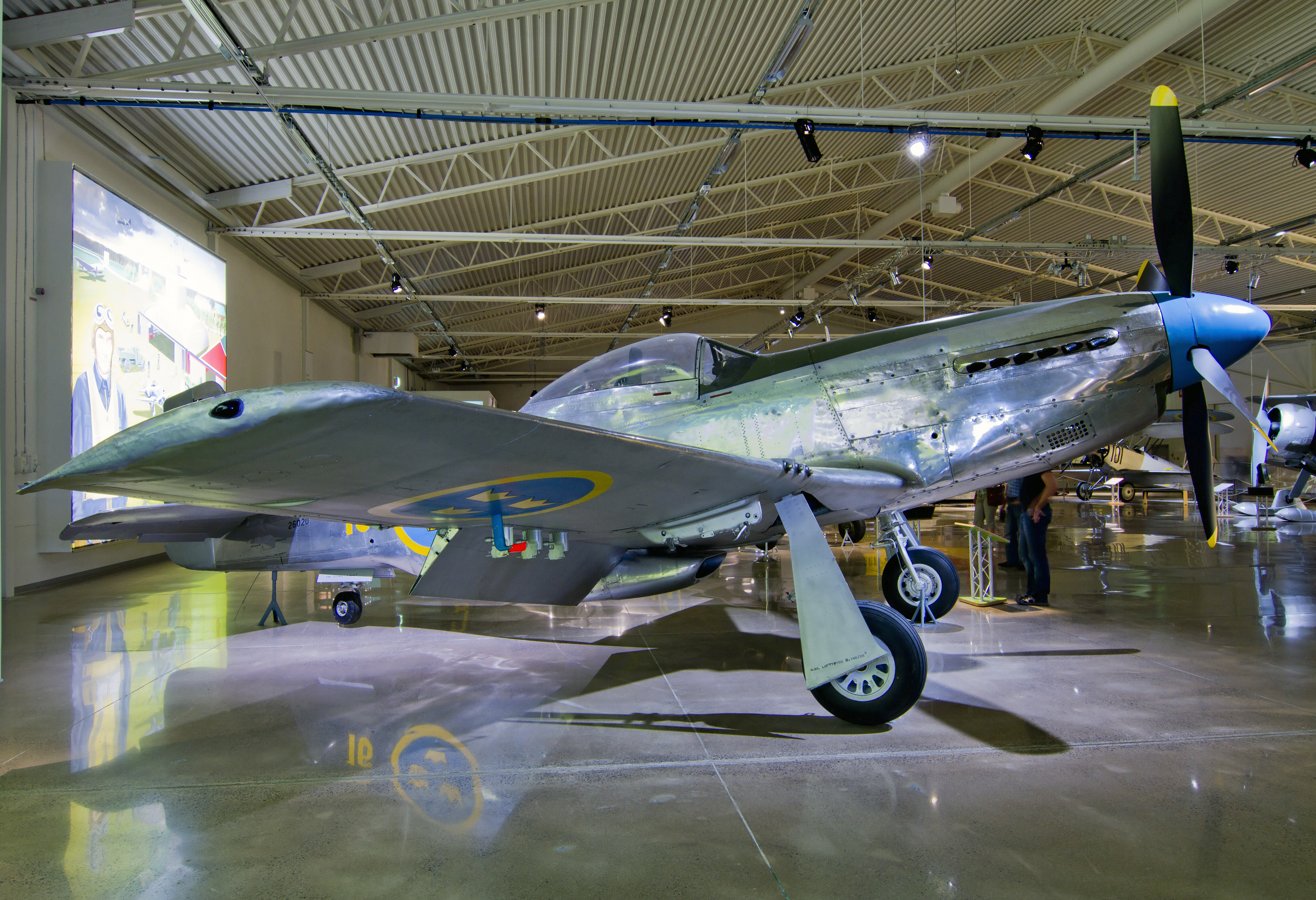
Swedish Air Force P-51D on display at the Swedish Air Force Museum

The Swedish Air Force underwent a rapid modernization from 1945. It was no longer politically acceptable to equip it with second-rate aircraft types. Instead, the Air Staff purchased the best it could find from abroad, e.g. P-51D Mustangs, De Havilland Mosquito NF.19 night fighters and de Havilland Vampires, and supported the development of top performance domestic models. The Saab 29 Tunnan jet fighter was introduced around 1950.

In the late 1950s the Swedish Air Force introduced the Bas 60 air base system, which revolved around force dispersal of air squadrons across many wartime air bases in case of war in order to make it complicated for an opponent to destroy the air force on the ground. Road runways were also introduced as backup runways. Bas 60 was developed further into Bas 90 during the 1970s and 1980s.

During the Cold War large amounts of money (including funds intended for the Swedish nuclear weapons programme) were spent on the Swedish Air Force and domestic aircraft production. In 1957 Sweden had the world's fourth most powerful air force, with about 1,000 modern planes in front-line service. During the 1950s, it introduced fighters such as the Saab J 29 Tunnan, Saab A 32 Lansen and Saab J 35 Draken.

In June 1952 the Swedish Air Force lost two aircraft on Cold War operations, in what became known as the Catalina affair. A signals intelligence Douglas DC-3 was intercepted by Soviet MiG-15s over the Baltic, and shot down with the loss of three aircrew and five civilian technicians. A PBY Catalina rescue seaplane was then also downed, the five-man crew being rescued from the sea by a freighter.

In the air defence role the Swedish Air Force also operated surface-to-air missiles. Svea Air Corps (F 8) operated de Havilland J-28B Vampire jet aircraft in 1949 being replaced in 1953 by Saab J-29 Tunnan and in 1957 by J-34 Hunter fighters. As of 1961 F 8 reroled into missile defence role becoming the air force technical training centre for using the new RB-68 Bloodhound systems in 2 squadrons until 1974.

These Swedish units also operated the RB-68 missile system (1 squadron each):

- Scania Wing, also F 10 Ängelholm
- Kalmar Wing, also F 12 Kalmar,
- Bråvalla Wing, also F 13 Norrköping
- Blekinge Wing, also F 17 Kallinge,

==== Death toll during the Cold War ====
In the Cold War era, more than 600 Swedish fighter pilots were killed in crashes during peacetime exercises and training in the 1945–1991 period. In the 1950s–60s era the flight training curriculum was deficient and the training regimes were too risky and some aircraft types had design flaws. In the 1950s, about 21 pilots were killed annually.

In the 1960s the average number of killed were 13 per year, which meant Sweden had sixfold mortality rate per 100,000 flight hours compared to the United States. In the 1960s flight safety started to become a consideration, not due to the death toll but because the aircraft were getting increasingly expensive. In October 1960, a Lansen fighter crashed into a farmhouse and killed 7 people. In the 1970s the death toll was reduced to 6–7 per year. In subsequent years, it continued to fall and from 1996 onwards, no fatal accident has been recorded.

=== War service ===
The Swedish Air Force has been involved in three wars, the Finno-Soviet Winter War in 1939–40, in which volunteers took part, the Congo Crisis, 1961–64, and in the 2011 Libyan civil war.

==== Finland 1940 ====
When the Soviet Union attacked Finland in November 1939, Sweden came to its neighbour's assistance but eventually decided not to join the war.

A Swedish volunteer infantry brigade and a volunteer air squadron fought in northern Finland from January to March 1940. The squadron was designated F 19 and consisted of 12 Gloster Gladiator fighters and four Hawker Hart dive-bombers.

==== Congo 1961–1964 ====
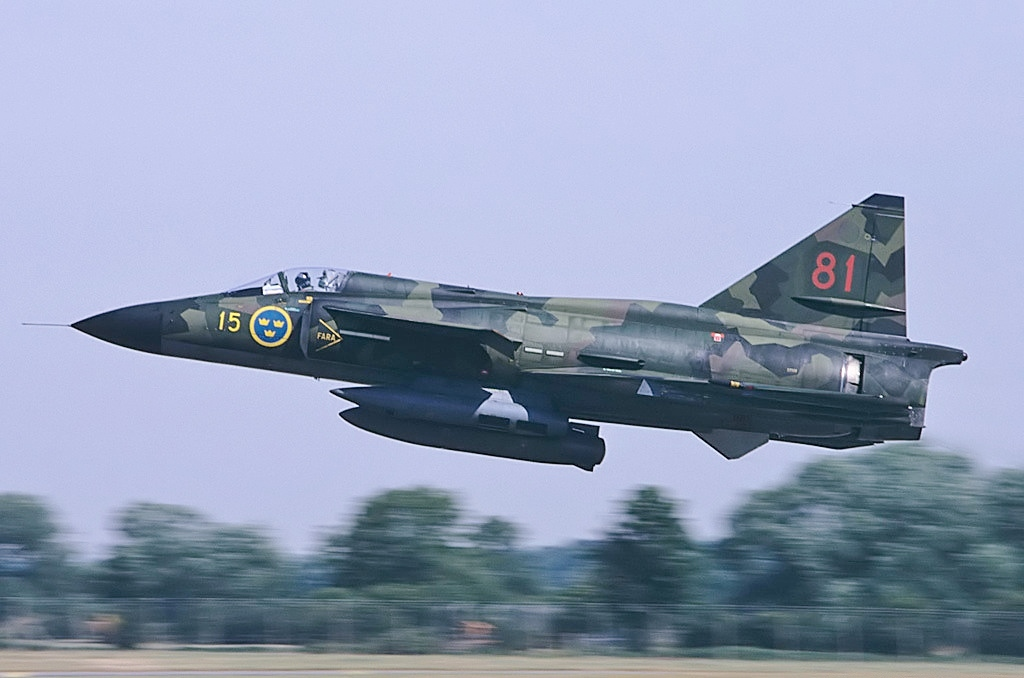
Saab 37 Viggen (1972–2005)

The Swedish Air Force saw combat as part of the United Nations peace-keeping mission ONUC during the Congo Crisis in 1961 to 1964. It established a separate air wing, F 22, equipped with a dozen Saab 29 Tunnans, which performed well under the rough conditions in central Africa. The secessionist adversaries possessed only a small number of aircraft with poor combat capabilities, e.g. Fouga Magister trainers.

=== 1990s restructuring ===
With the end of the Cold War the Swedish Armed Forces underwent a massive restructuring process. During this time, several air bases were deemed unnecessary and closed with fighters like the Saab 37 Viggen retired prematurely. In 1994 the Air Force had over 400 fighters, by 2005 that number had shrunk to fewer than 150.

=== Libya 2011 ===
On 29 March 2011, the Swedish prime minister announced that eight Saab JAS 39 Gripens would support the UN-mandated no-fly zone over Libya. The announcement responded to a NATO request for assistance. The Swedish fighters were limited to supporting the no-fly zone and were not authorized to engage in ground attack sorties. The deployment was approved by the Riksdag on 1 April 2011 and the first jets departed for Libya on 2 April. A C-130 Hercules accompanied the fighters for mid-air refueling.

=== Poland 2025 ===
In March of 2025 Sweden, now a part of NATO, sent six Saab Gripen fighters to Poland to take part in an enhanced air policing mission to protect NATO's borders from Russia.

== Equipment ==
=== Aircraft ===
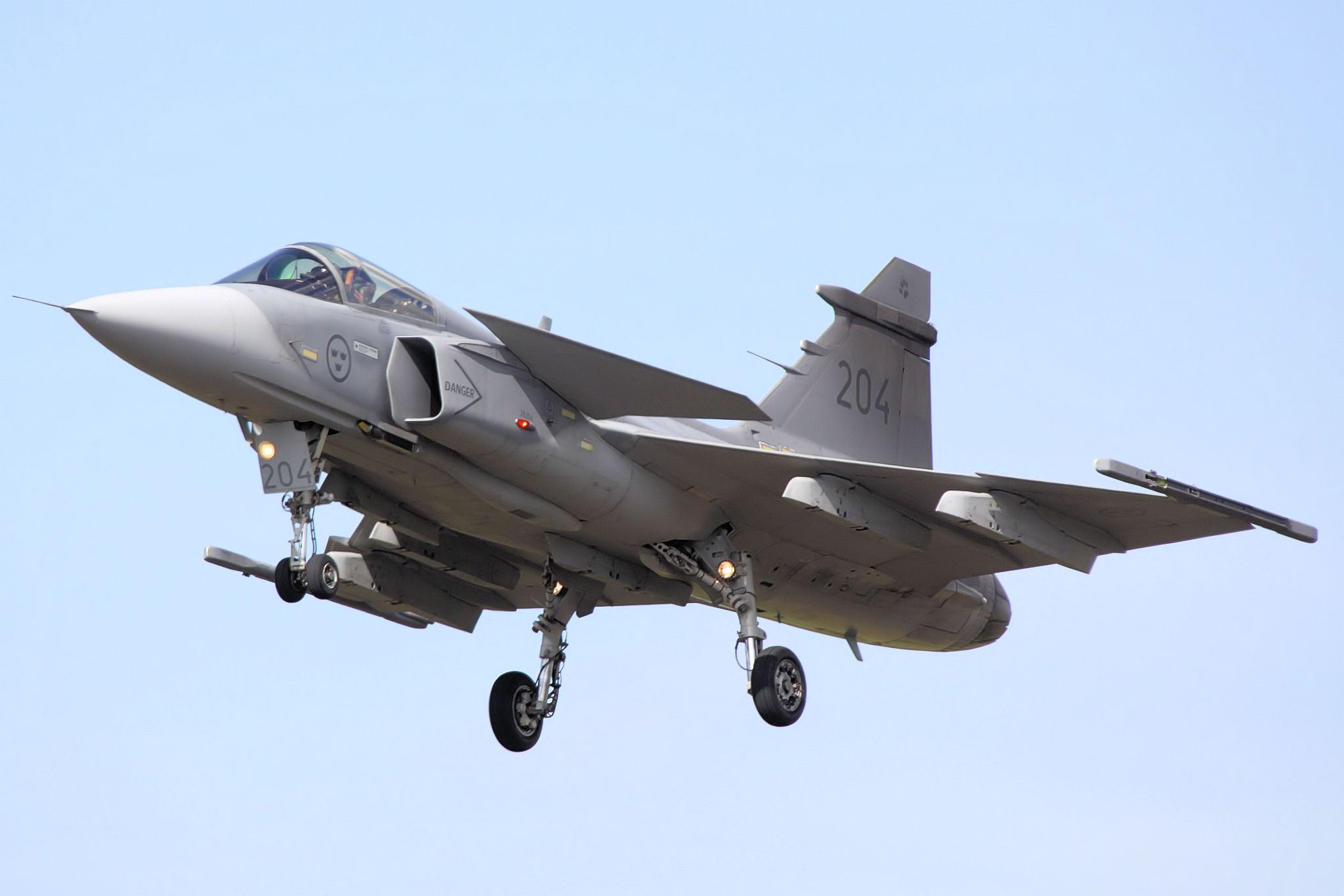
A Gripen C performing at RIAT 2009

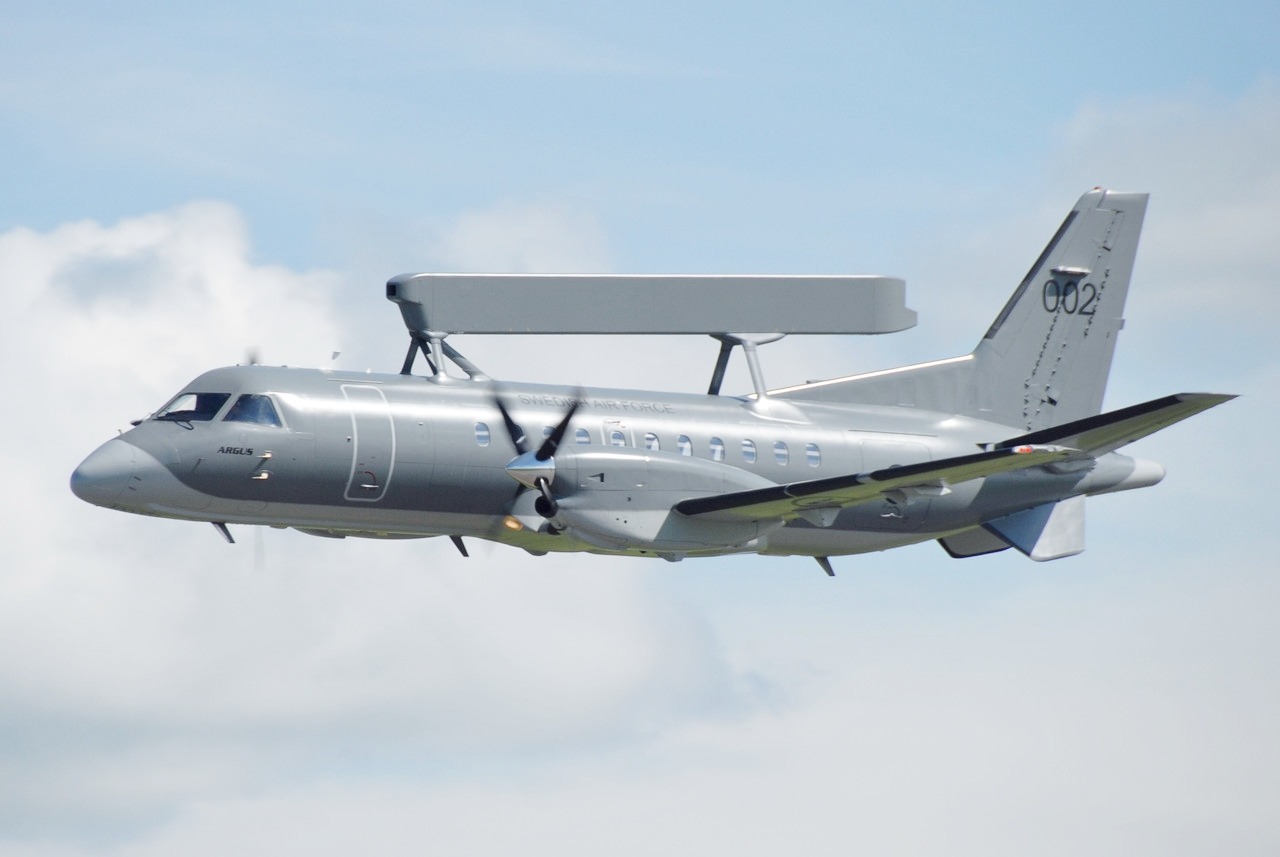
A Saab 340 AEW&C (S 100) in flight at the Swedish Armed Forces' Airshow 2010

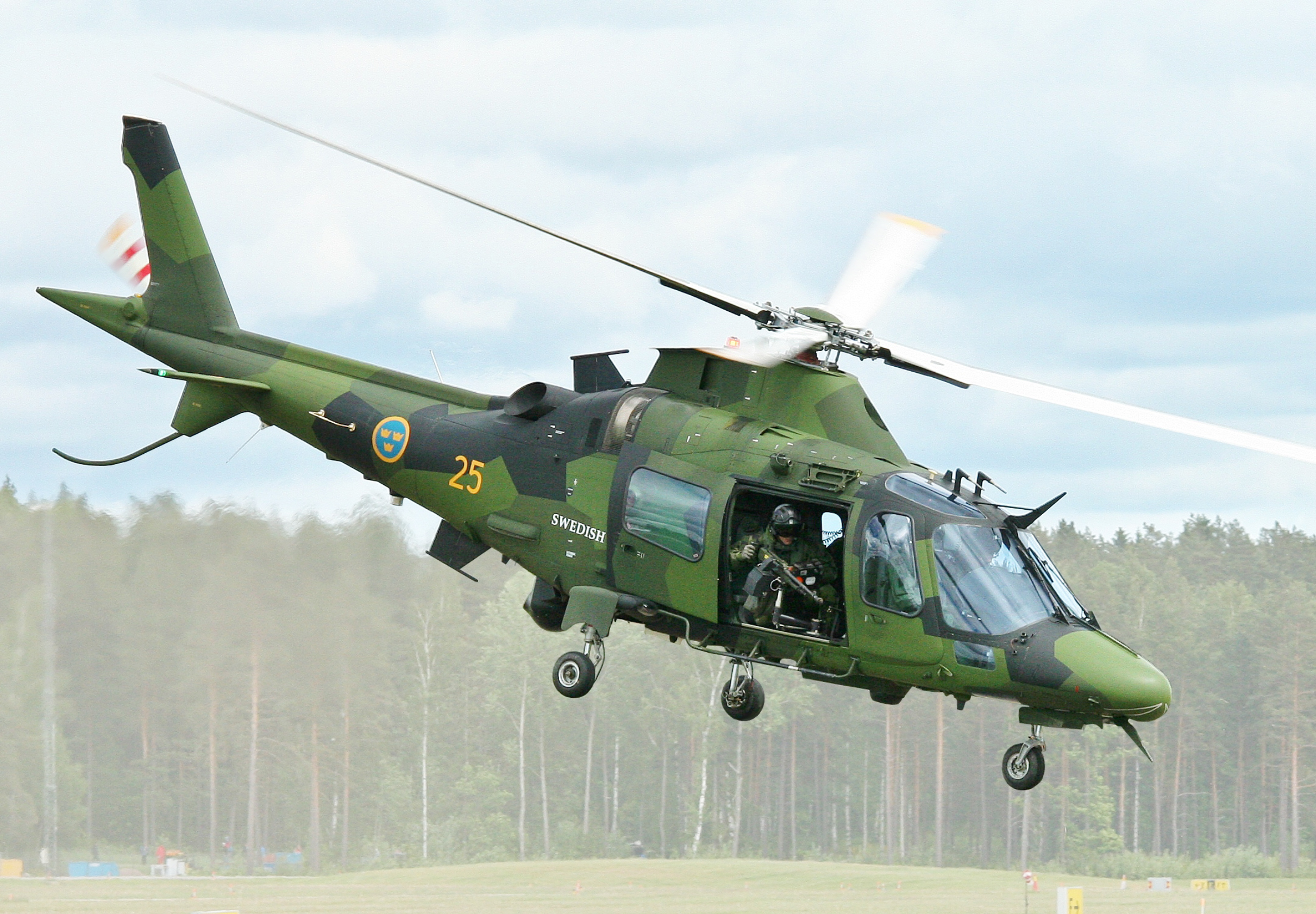
An A109E (HKP 15A) on take off

Aircraft	Origin	Role	Variant	In service	Notes
Combat aircraft
JAS 39 Gripen	Sweden	Swingrole fighter	JAS 39C	71	Total of 60 Gripen E were ordered. 12 additional planned to be ordered as of July 2026.
JAS 39 Gripen	Sweden	Swingrole fighter	JAS 39E	2 (+58 on order)	Total of 60 Gripen E were ordered. 12 additional planned to be ordered as of July 2026.
JAS 39 Gripen	Sweden	Swingrole fighter	JAS 39A; JAS 39B	0	24 in storage
Special role aircraft
Gulfstream IV	United States	SIGINT	S 102B Korpen	2	Sensors focus on radar, navigation and weapon systems.
Saab 340B	Sweden	Open Skies reconnaissance / Transport / liaison	TP 100A	1	Photographic observation over foreign territory.
Global 6000 - GlobalEye	Sweden; Canada	AEW&C	S 106	0 (+ 3 on order)	2 ordered in June 2022 (+2 options). 1 ordered in June 2024 (1 option exercised. First delivery expected in 2027. Will be pooled with the Royal Netherlands Air and Space Force aircraft and jointly operated
Tanker
KC-130 Hercules	United States	Aerial refueling	KC-130H	1	
Transport
C-130 Hercules	United States	Tactical airlifter	TP 84D (C-130H)	5	To be replaced by the Embraer C-390.
Embraer C-390	Brazil	Tactical airlifter	–	0 (+4 on order)	Ordered in October 2025 to replace the C-130H fleet.
Saab 340B+	Sweden	Transport / liaison	TP 100A	1	
Bombardier Global 6500	Canada	VIP transport	TP 106	2	Used aircraft, in service 2026. It succeeds to: Gulfstream IV - TP 102C; Gulfstream G550 - TP 102D
Helicopters
Sikorsky UH-60	United States	Utility / transport / MEDEVAC	HKP 16 (UH-60M)	15 (+12 on order)	15 acquired to replace 10 Super Puma. 12 more ordered in July 2025 to replace the HKP 14E.
NHIndustries NH90	France; Germany; Italy; Netherlands	Utility / transport / (MEDEVAC)	HKP 14E (NH90 TTH)	9	Will be retired 2027 onwards.
NHIndustries NH90	France; Germany; Italy; Netherlands	ASW / ASuW; Utility / transport (SAR)	HKP 14F (NH90 TTH)	9	Will be retired 2030 onwards.
AgustaWestland AW109	Italy	Light utility / Transport / MEDEVAC / CASEVAC / trainer	HKP 15A (A109LUH)	12	Can be equipped with a fast-rope for special forces missions, or with a modular medical interior.
AgustaWestland AW109	Italy	Light utility / transport / liaison / ASW / SAR	HKP 15B (A109LUH)	8	Operates from Navy vessels, can be equipped with sonar buoys for ASW missions.
Trainer aircraft
JAS 39 Gripen	Sweden	Conversion trainer	JAS 39D	23	
Grob G 120TP	Germany	Basic trainer	–	13	
UAV
Elbit Skylark	Israel	Fixed-wing UAV, ISTAR	UAV 02 Falken	48	48 ordered in 2007. VTOL capability.
AAI RQ-7 Shadow	United States; Sweden	Fixed-wing UAV, ISTAR	UAV03 Örnen (Shadow 200)	8	Purchased in 2010, 2 systems with 4 drones each. Modified by Saab, using in house technologies (sensors, systems, communications).
AeroVironment Wasp III	United States	Fixed-wing UAV, ISR	UAV 04 Svalan	3	Surveillance drone purchased in 2012 for the missions in Mali and Afghanistan.
AeroVironment RQ-20 Puma	United States	Fixed-wing UAV, ISR	UAV 05B Korpen	12	Surveillance drone purchased in 2012 for the missions in Mali and Afghanistan.
Satellites
ICEYE	Finland	SAR satellite	–	0 (+10 on order)	Ordered in January 2026, deliveries between 2026 and 2028.
Planet Labs	United States	LEO satellite, high resolution imagery	–	N/A	The Swedish Armed Forces signed a contract in 2026.

=== Shared fleet ===
Aircraft	Operators	Origin	Role	Variant	In service	Notes
Aerial refueling
Airbus A330 MRTT; Multi-Role Tanker Transport	MMF; Multinational MRTT Fleet; Belgium; Czech Republic; Denmark; Finland; Germany; Luxembourg; Netherlands; Norway; Sweden	Spain; Germany; France; United Kingdom	Tanker / Transporter / MEDEVAC	A330-200 MRTT	9 (+3 on order)	Based at the Eindhoven Air Base in the Netherlands. Orders (+ nations initiating / joining the programme): 2 in July 2016 (Netherlands, Luxembourg); 5 in September 2018 (Germany, Norway); 1 in February 2018 (Belgium); 1 in September 2020 (Luxembourg); 1 in March 2023 (Belgium); 2 in June 2025 (Sweden, Denmark); (Finland); The first aircraft entered service in June 2020, the ninth in February 2025).
A330 MRTT MEDEVAC kit	MMF; Multinational MRTT Fleet; Belgium; Czech Republic; Denmark; Finland; Germany; Luxembourg; Netherlands; Norway; Sweden	European Union	MEDEVAC kit	–	1	One of the MRTT aircraft of the Multinational MRTT Fleet comes with the MEDEVAC kits. Kit with: 6 ICU, 16 stretchers and 21 chairs for medical support.
Transport
Boeing C-17 Globemaster III	SAC; Strategic Airlift Capability; Bulgaria; Estonia; Finland; Hungary; Lithuania; Netherlands; Norway; Poland; Romania; Slovenia; Sweden; United States	United States	Strategic transport aircraft	C-17A	3	Heavy Airlift Wing based at Pápa Air Base in Hungary.

== Organization ==
Swedish Air Force bases 2024:
JAS 39C/D Gripen Helicopters Other bases

=== Fighter wings ===
There are four fighter wings:

- Skaraborg Wing (F 7), at Såtenäs Air Base, operates JAS 39C/D
- Uppland Wing (F 16), at Ärna Air Base, reestablished in 2021 and without fighter divisions as of 2024
- Blekinge Wing (F 17), at Ronneby Air Base, operates JAS 39C/D
- Norrbotten Wing (F 21), at Luleå Air Base, operates JAS 39C/D

=== Helicopter squadrons ===
The aviation units that were formerly under the Swedish Army ("Arméflyget") and the Swedish Navy ("Marinflyget") have been merged with the helicopter units of the Air Force to form the single Helicopter Wing (Hkpflj) for the entire Armed Forces. The wing has been placed under the authority of the Air Force and consists of:

- 1st Helicopter Squadron, co-located with Norrbotten Wing at Luleå Air Base, operates NH90 TTH (Hkp 14E)
- 2nd Helicopter Squadron, at Malmen Air Base, operates AW109 (Hkp 15) and UH-60M Black Hawk (Hkp 16)
- 3rd Helicopter Squadron, co-located with Blekinge Wing at Ronneby Air Base, operates NH90 TTH (Hkp 14F) and AW109 (Hkp 15)
- 4th Helicopter Squadron, at Malmen Air Base, operates AW109 (Hkp 15) and UH-60M Black Hawk (Hkp 16)

=== Other squadrons ===
The air transport units perform airlift operations, and are used in both national and in international missions. The unit also organizes the Swedish part of the Heavy Airlift Wing in Hungary. Signals reconnaissance units conduct electronic combat reconnaissance and intelligence gathering.

- 71st Air Transport Squadron, co-located with Skaraborg Wing at Såtenäs Air Base, operates C-130H Hercules
- 74th Special Air Squadron, at Malmen Air Base, operates Gulfstream IV-SP, Saab 340 AEW&C and Saab 340
- 75th State Air Squadron, at Arlanda Air Base, operates Gulfstream IV and Gulfstream 550

== Future of the Swedish Air Force ==
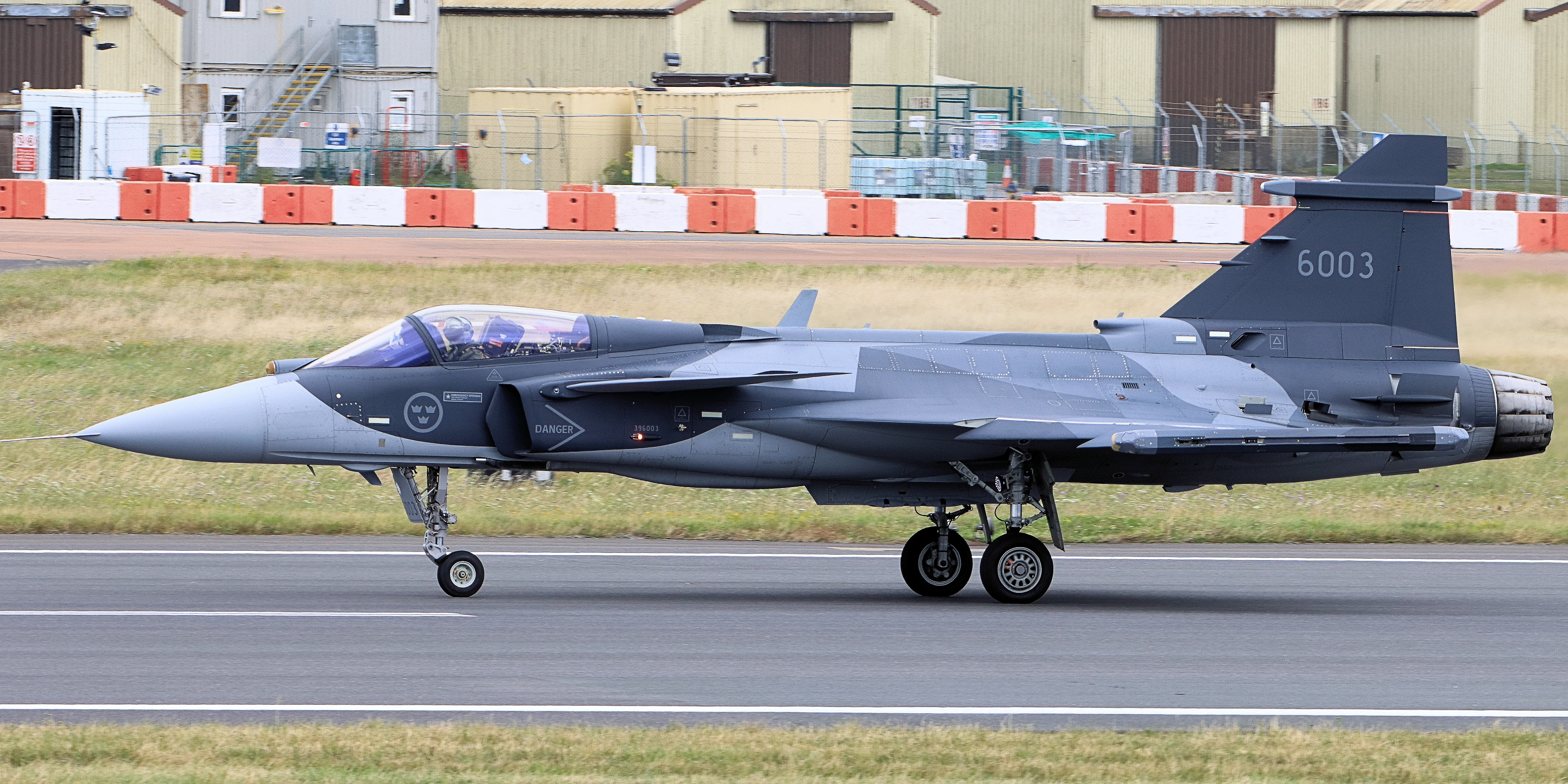
Gripen E at RIAT 2023

During the 2026 Farnborough airshow the commander of the Swedish Air Force stated that the air force in the near future will consist of 60 Jas 39C/D and 72 Jas 39E.

In November 2022, the Strategic Defence Plan was published in which it was announced that all NH90 helicopters will be phased out and replaced, additional Sikorsky Black Hawks will be ordered for the tactical transport role, a new medium sized helicopter for the ASW/ASuW role will be selected.

=== Saab JAS 39 Gripen E ===
Currently the Swedish Air Force main fighter is the Saab JAS 39 Gripen, in the C/D versions. By 2018 95 fighters were active with about 30 of these being updated from the A version.

The heavily modernised E version will augment the current fleet of Gripen C/D. The aircraft includes a new Active Electronically Scanned Array (AESA) radar, an Infrared search and track (IRST) sensor and is powered by the improved General Electric F414G. Gripen E also has an increased maximum take-off weight, carries more fuel and has two more hardpoints than the Gripen C/D allowing it to carry more weapons. The upgrade also includes the integration of new weapons like the Meteor air-to-air missile. In 2013 Saab signed an agreement with the Swedish Defence Materiel Administration for 60 new Gripen E. The first JAS 39E was handed over to the Skaraborg wing (F 7) in October 2025 and the model is planned to remain in service until at least 2060. In 2026 the Swedish government announced plans to order an additional 12 Gripen E at a later date.

=== Next generation fighter jet ===
The Swedish Air Force plans to retain its fleet of JAS 39C/D until some time after 2030. In an effort to replace JAS 39C/D the Swedish Air Force has formulated three options for the procurement of a new fighter jet with a decision to be made in 2031 at the latest.

- Fully domestic development of a next generation fighter jet
- Joint development of a next generation fighter jet with other countries
- "Off-the-shelf" purchase of a foreign fighter jet

In an effort to maintain the possibility of pursuing any of the three options SAAB was awarded a two year contract by the Swedish Air Force for concept studies for next generation fighter jet studies in 2024. The program, called KFS, includes the development of both a next generation crewed fighter jet and uncrewed systems such as loyal wingmen. The construction of technology demonstrators is planned during the second phase of studies which will commence in 2026.

Sweden had signed a memorandum of Understanding (MOU) with the United Kingdom and Italy in 2021 regarding the joint development of next generation technologies for the Tempest fighter jet. Sweden would later walk away from the project which by then had evolved into GCAP citing differences between its requirements for a next generation fighter jet and those of the UK, Italy and Japan.

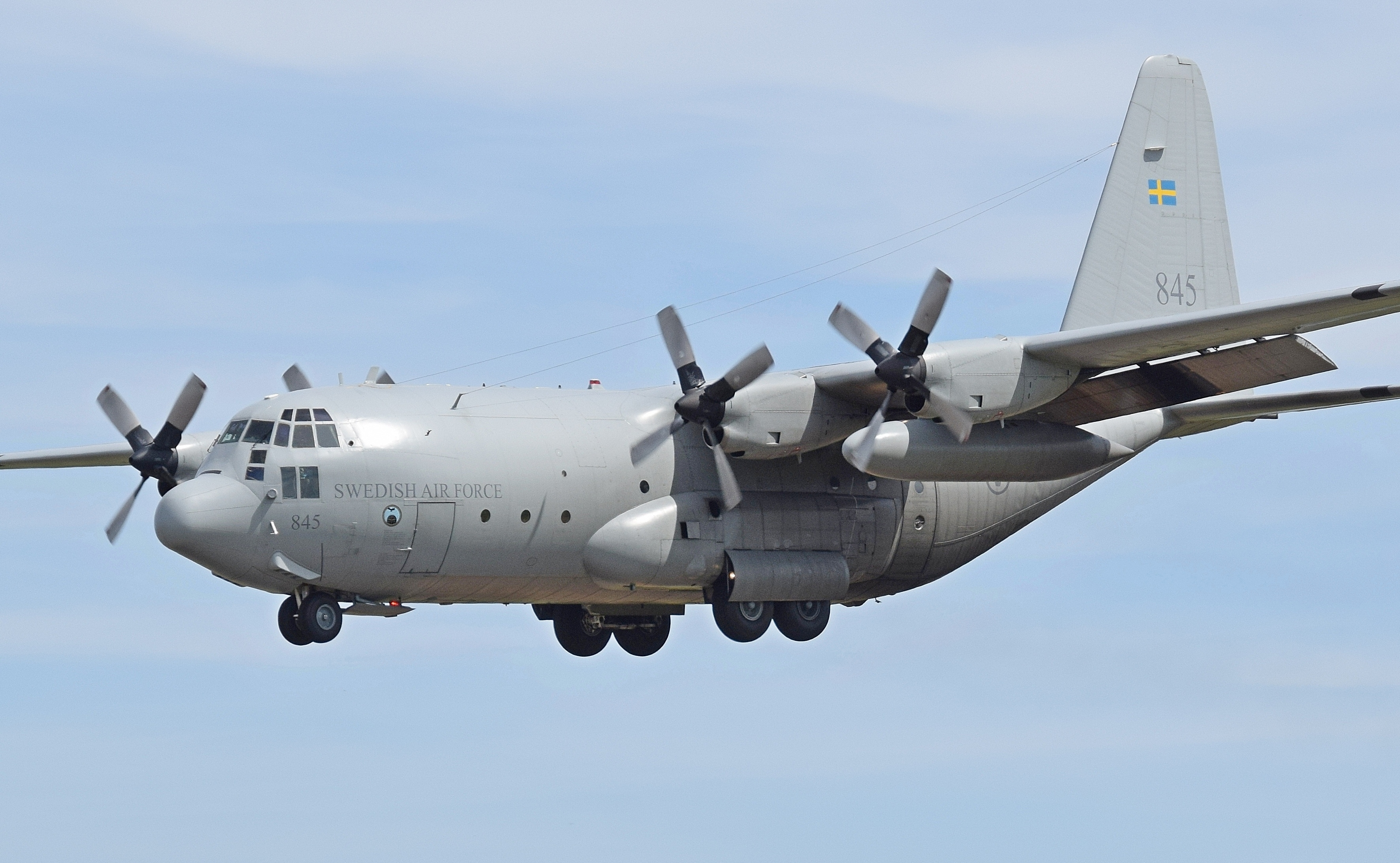
A Swedish Air Force C-130 Hercules at the 2017 RIAT, England

=== Military transport aircraft ===
The Swedish C-130 Hercules (TP 84) were bought from the United States in the 1960s and has been updated several times. The Swedish Defence Materiel Administration has been tasked to update the aircraft so they can remain in service until 2030. In November 2024 the Swedish Air Force announced that it had selected the Embraer C-390 Millennium as its future military transport aircraft. As part of the Heavy Airlift Wing cooperation, Sweden also operates three Boeing C-17 which are located at Pápa Air Base in Hungary.

=== Training aircraft ===
Sweden used the Saab 105 as the primary jet-trainer until phase out per June 2024. About forty planes were operational. Designed in the 1960s the aircraft is starting to show its age and were gradually phased out from active service. The Swedish Air Force selected the Grob G 120TP as its new Basic Trainer Aircraft, designated SK 40. Ten aircraft have been ordered and delivered but due to work environment problems caused by high workload the implementation of the new planes have been put on hold temporarily.

=== Saab GlobalEye AEW&C ===
Sweden will procure the Saab GlobalEye airborne early warning and control (AEW&C) platform to replace its two S100D/ASC890. The Swedish Armed Forces submitted an official request to the government to buy the Saab GlobalEye platform on October 1, 2021. On October 24, 2021 the Swedish government approved the purchase to replace its old S100D/ASC890.

On 30 June 2022 SAAB and the Swedish Defence Materiel Administration (FMV) signed a contract for the acquisition of two GlobalEye aircraft, to be designated S 106 in Swedish service. The deal is valued at 7,3 billion SEK (US$710 million) and deliveries was scheduled for 2027. The contract also included the option to procure up to two additional GlobalEye aircraft. After pledging its current Saab ASC 890 platforms to Ukraine, the GlobalEye delivery was expedited and one additional aircraft was ordered by the Swedish Air Force.

=== Space ===
The interest in military use of the space domain by the Swedish Armed Forces became established after the Gulf War where the necessity of military satellites in modern warfare became apparent.

The Defence Act of 2020 included provisions for the establishment of a space-focused unit, influenced by the recent formation of the United States Space Force. By this time, the Swedish Armed Forces had also identified the need for such a capability to safeguard national sovereignty. As a result, the Space Division was established within the Swedish Air Force in 2023.

On 16 August 2024, in cooperation with SpaceX, the Swedish Armed Forces launched their first military satellite, the experimental communications satellite GNA-3, from Vandenberg Space Force Base.

== Ranks ==
Commissioned officer ranks

The rank insignia of commissioned officers.

NATO code	OF-10	OF-9	OF-8	OF-7	OF-6	OF-5	OF-4	OF-3	OF-2	OF-1
Swedish Air Force
Swedish Air Force		General	Generallöjtnant	Generalmajor	Brigadgeneral	Överste	Överstelöjtnant	Major	Kapten	Löjtnant	Fänrik

Other ranks

The rank insignia of non-commissioned officers and enlisted personnel.

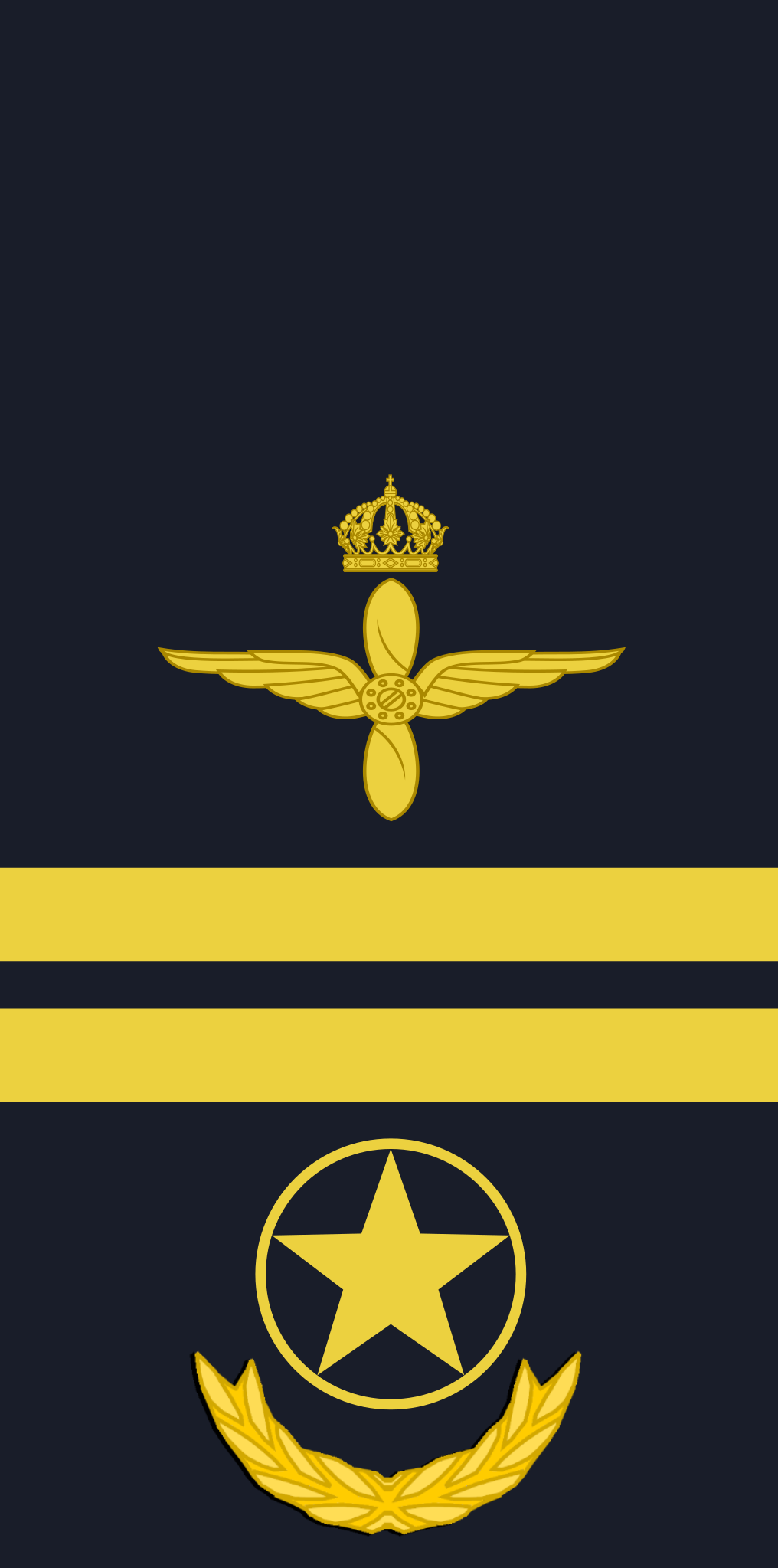
NATO code	OR-9	OR-8	OR-7		OR-6		OR-5		OR-4	OR-3	OR-2				OR-1
Swedish Air Force
Swedish Air Force	Flottiljförvaltare	Förvaltare	Överfanjunkare	Fanjunkare	Översergeant	Sergeant	Överfurir	Furir	Korpral	Vicekorpral	Menig 4	Menig 3	Menig 2	Menig 1	Menig

== See also ==
- Chief of Air Force (Sweden)
- Royal Swedish Academy of War Sciences
- List of air forces
- Swedish Air Force Museum
- Swedish Air Force Historic Flight

=== Swedish military equipment ===
List of equipment of the Swedish Armed Forces

- Swedish Air Force
  - List of equipment of the Swedish Air Force
  - Weapons of the Swedish Air Force
  - List of military aircraft of Sweden
- Swedish Army:
  - List of equipment of the Swedish Army
- Swedish Navy
  - List of active ships of the Swedish Navy
  - List of equipment of the Swedish Navy
- Swedish Home Guard
  - List of equipment of the Swedish Home Guard

=== People ===
- Bengt Nordenskiöld
- Lars Olausson
