= Styrsö-class mine countermeasures vessel =

Ship class

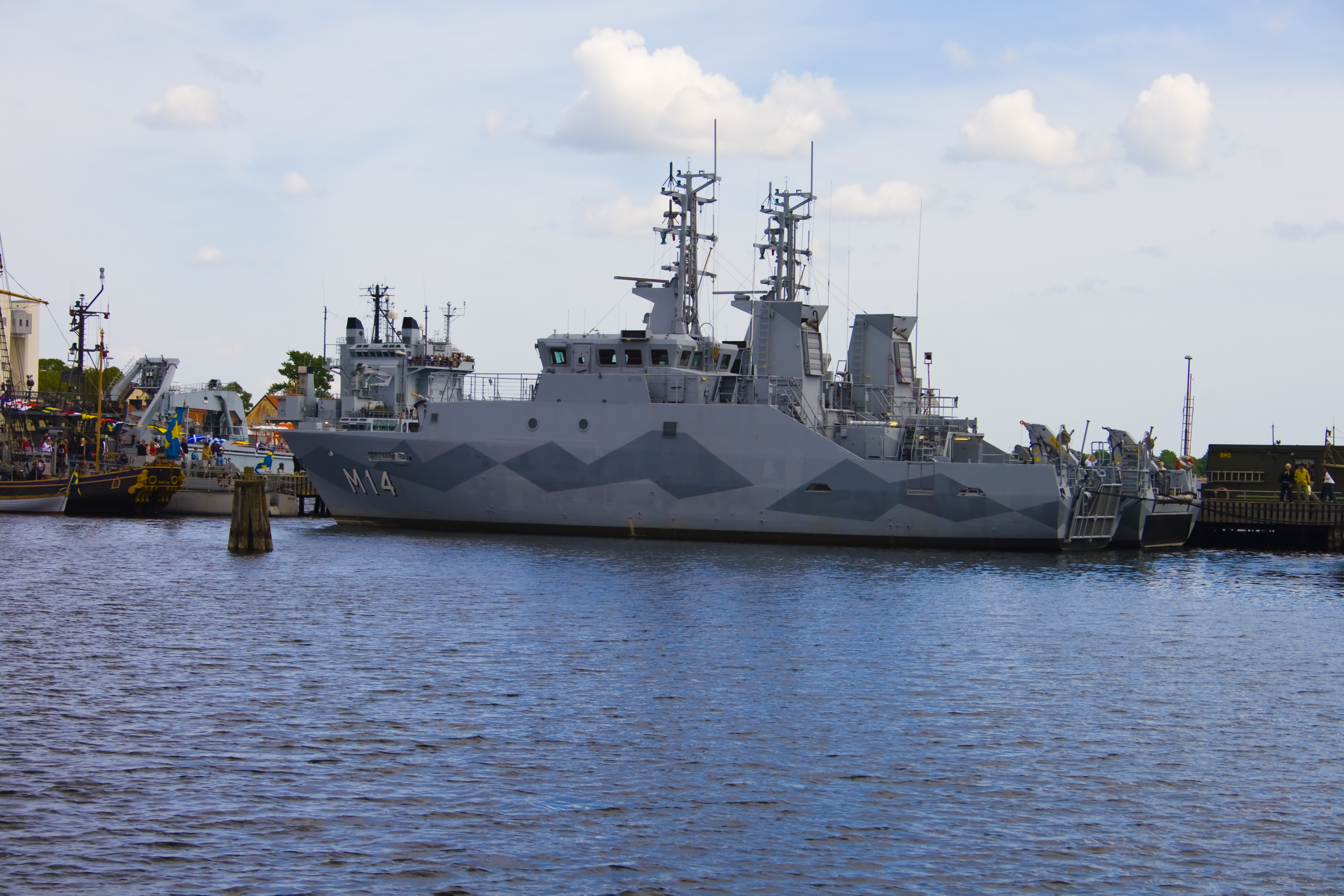
- M14 HMS Sturkö

Class overview
- Name: Styrsö class
- Builders: Kockums
- Operators: Swedish Navy
- Built: 1996–1997
- Completed: 4
- Active: 4

General characteristics
- Type: Mine countermeasures vessel
- Displacement: 205 t (202 long tons)
- Length: 36.0 m (118 ft 1 in)
- Beam: 7.9 m (25 ft 11 in)
- Draught: 2.2 m (7 ft 3 in)
- Propulsion: 2 Saab Scania DSI 14
- Speed: 13 knots (24 km/h; 15 mph)
- Complement: 10 officers and 8 ratings
- Armament: 2 × 12.7 mm (0.50 in) machine guns

The Styrsö class is a series of mine countermeasures vessels in service with the Swedish Navy built from glass fibre. Among its intended missions are naval mine detection, mine hunting and patrolling. The ships are named after islands from four different archipelagos of Sweden. In 2004 HSwMS Spårö and HSwMS Sturkö were modernised, pulling out some of their capability for traditional mine clearance in favour of extended human dive support, the modified vessels are occasionally called Spårö class.

== Description ==
The ships are equipped for acoustic, magnetic and mechanical mine clearance. There is also an underwater vehicle type Uven and a towed array sonar on board. It is also possible to manoeuvre the remote-controlled mine clearance system "SAM" from the ships. The Styrsö-class ships have very good manoeuvring properties and are used for hunting bottom mines, traditional mine sweeping and operating in coastal waters. They carry underwater remotely-operated vehicles (ROVs) of the type Uven and are prepared for the next generation of ROVs called ROV S.

The class is built exclusively with civilian technology, so-called (COTS), everything from diesel engines to the computers on board have been bought from the civilian market. This method simplifies the procedure of upgrading the system, it is also very cost-effective eliminating the need to develop new expensive military systems. The ships have a completely integrated command and navigation system with computer communication and projection of charts in a 3D environment.

== History ==
The class consists of four ships that were built from 1996 to 1997. They are an important addition to the Swedish mine clearance ability. In 2004 HSwMS Spårö and HSwMS Sturkö were modernised, pulling out some of their capability for traditional mine clearance in favour of extended human dive support, the modified vessels are occasionally called Spårö class.

== Units ==
Bow number	Ship name	Laid down	Launched	Commissioned	Note
M11	Styrsö			1996	In material reserve
M12	Spårö		30 August 1996	21 February 1997	Converted to diving support vessel
17 (M13)	Skaftö		1997	1997	Converted to command and supply vessel
M14	Sturkö			1998	Converted to diving support vessel
