= Swedish Coast Guard ships =

The Swedish Coast Guard consist of 31 larger units, of which 10 are multipurpose ships, 16 maritime surveillance ships and 5 environmental protection ships. In addition to these, there are also five hovercraft, a barge and about 100 smaller boats and jet skis.

== Multipurpose ships ==
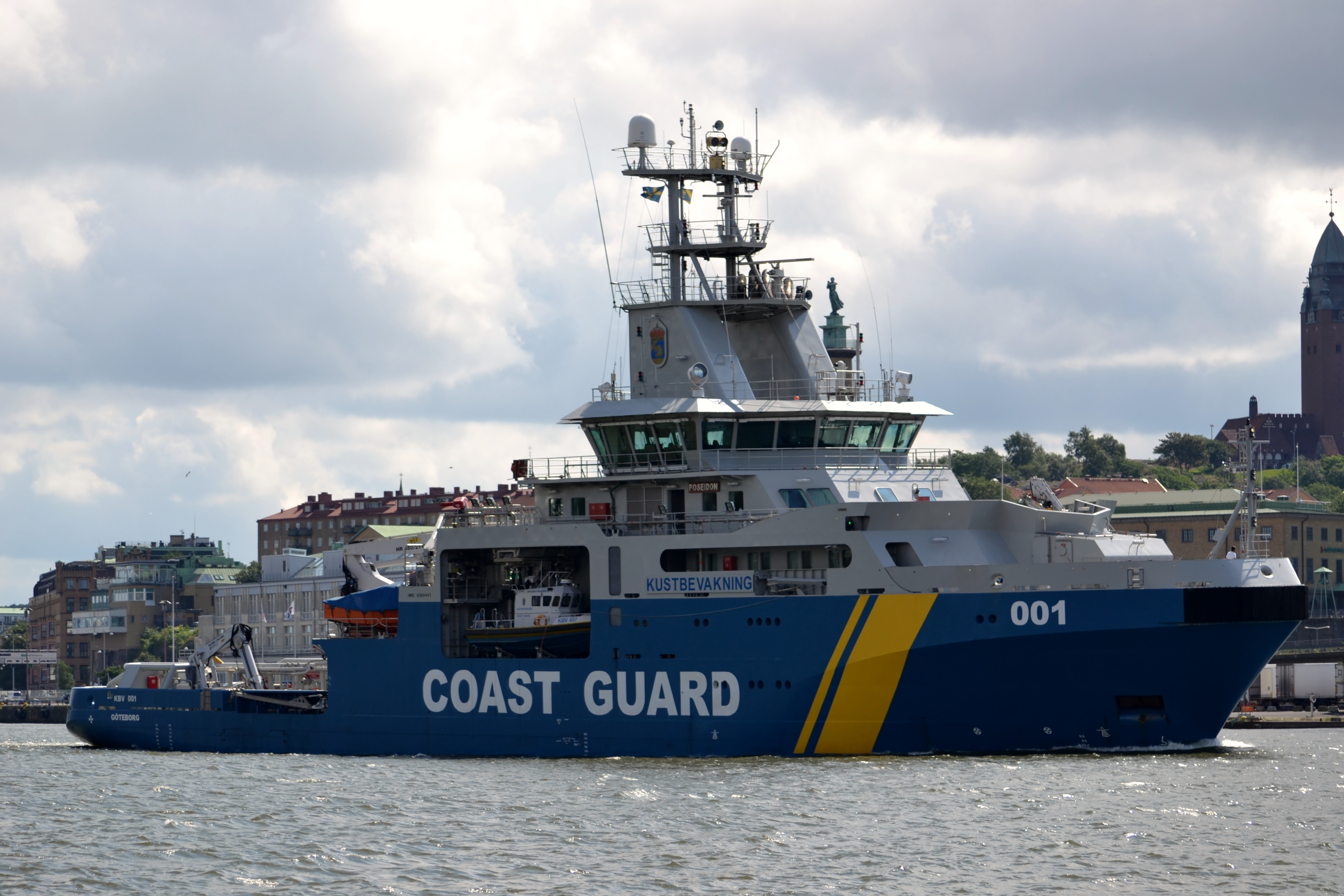
KBV 001 Poseidon is one of the Swedish coastguards largest ships

The multipurpose ships combine the tasks of the environmental protection and maritime surveillance units, and can perform both types of tasks. The multipurpose ships also have the option of emergency towing other ships as well as fire extinguishing. In the coast guard there are 4 different classes of multipurpose ships, the 001-series, the 031-series, the KBV-181 and the 201-series

Name	Commissioned	Builder	Length	Width	Deplacement	Homeport
KBV 001 Poseidon	2009	Damen Shipyards Galați	81.2 m	16 m	3 800 ton	Gothenburg
KBV 002 Triton	2009	Damen Galati	81.2 m	16 m	3 800 ton	Slite
KBV 003 Amfitrite	2010	Damen Galati	81.2 m	16 m	3 800 ton	Karlskrona
KBV 031	2011	Peenevarvet, Wolgast	52 m	10 m	948 ton	Djurö
KBV 032	2012	Peenevarvet, Wolgast	52 m	10 m	948 ton	Lysekil
KBV 033	2013	Peenevarvet Wolgast	52 m	10 m	948 ton	Oskarshamn
KBV 034	2013	Peenevarvet, Wolgast	52 m	10 m	948 ton	Helsingborg
KBV 181	1990	Rauma shipyard	53 m	10.2 m	904 ton	Umeå
KBV 202	2001	Karlskronavarvet	52 m	8.6 m	468 ton	Simrishamn
KBV 201	2001	Karlskronavarvet	52 m	8.6 m	468 ton	Helsingborg

== Maritime surveillance ships ==
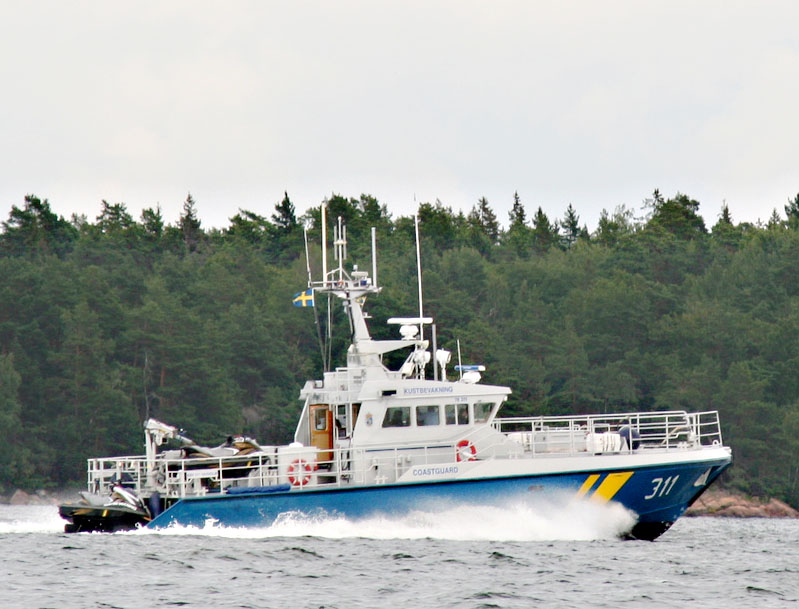
KBV 311, in Vaxholm

The Coast Guard's maritime surveillance ships is mainly used for maritime surveillance. The ships are between 20 and 26.5 meters long. Some ships also have the ability of firefighting and environmental protection. 11 of the surveillance ships are part of the 301 series which were delivered during the 1990s from the Karlskrona shipyard. The other 5 ships in the 312 series were delivered in 2012–2013 from Estonian Baltic Work Boats

Name	Commissioned	Builder	Length	Width	Deplacement	Homeport
KBV 301	1993	Karlskronavarvet	20 m	4.7 m	35 ton	Helsingborg
KBV 302	1995	Karlskronavarvet	20 m	4.7 m	35 ton	Djurö
KBV 303	1995	Karlskronavarvet	20 m	4.7 m	35 ton	Skärhamn
KBV 304	1995	Karlskronavarvet	20 m	4.7 m	35 ton	Västervik
KBV 305	1996	Karlskronavarvet	20 m	4.7 m	35 ton	Gryt
KBV 306	1996	Karlskronavarvet	20 m	4.7 m	35 ton	Luleå
KBV 307	1996	Karlskronavarvet	20 m	4.7 m	35 ton	Strömstad
KBV 308	1996	Karlskronavarvet	20 m	4.7 m	35 ton	Örnsköldsvik
KBV 309	1997	Karlskronavarvet	20 m	4.7 m	35 ton	Hudiksvall
KBV 310	1997	Karlskronavarvet	20 m	4.7 m	35 ton	Furusund
KBV 311	1997	Karlskronavarvet	20 m	4.7 m	35 ton	Vaxholm
KBV 312	2012	Baltic Workboats	26.5 m	6.2 m	54 ton	
KBV 313	2012	Baltic Workboats	26.5 m	6.2 m	54 ton	
KBV 314	2012	Baltic Workboats	26.5 m	6.2 m	54 ton	
KBV 315	2013	Baltic Workboats	26.5 m	6.2 m	54 ton	
KBV 316	2013	Baltic Workboats	26.5 m	6.2 m	54 ton	

== Environmental protection ships ==
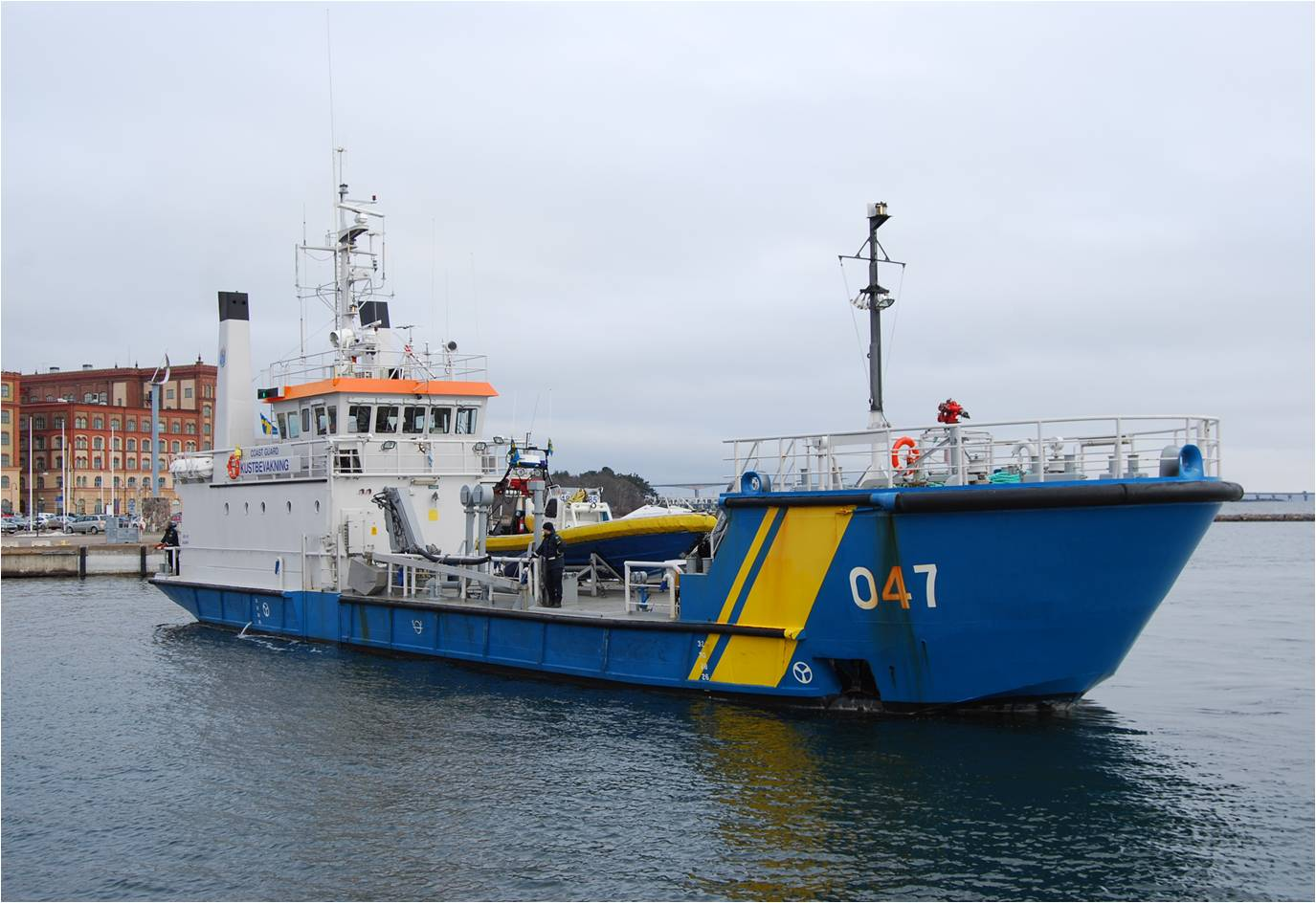
KBV 047, in Kalmar

The Coast Guard's environmental protection vessels are mainly used for environmental protection and oil pollution control. This is done by being able to absorb oil that is floating on the surface of the water. The environmental protection vessels are larger than the surveillance vessels, between 36 and 46 meters long. These ships are also deployed to maritime surveillance missions in limited capacity.

Name	Commissioned	Builder	Length	Width	Deplacement	Homeport
KBV 010	1985	Lunde varv	46.1 m	8.6 m	430 ton	Djurö
KBV 047	1982	Lunde varv	36.4 m	7.3 m	340 ton	Kalmar
KBV 048	1982	Lunde varv	36.4 m	7.3 m	340 ton	Malmö
KBV 050	1983	Lunde varv	40.7 m	8.5 m	375 ton	Södertälje
KBV 051	1983	Lunde varv	40.7 m	8.5 m	375 ton	Gothenburg

== Smaller Vessels ==
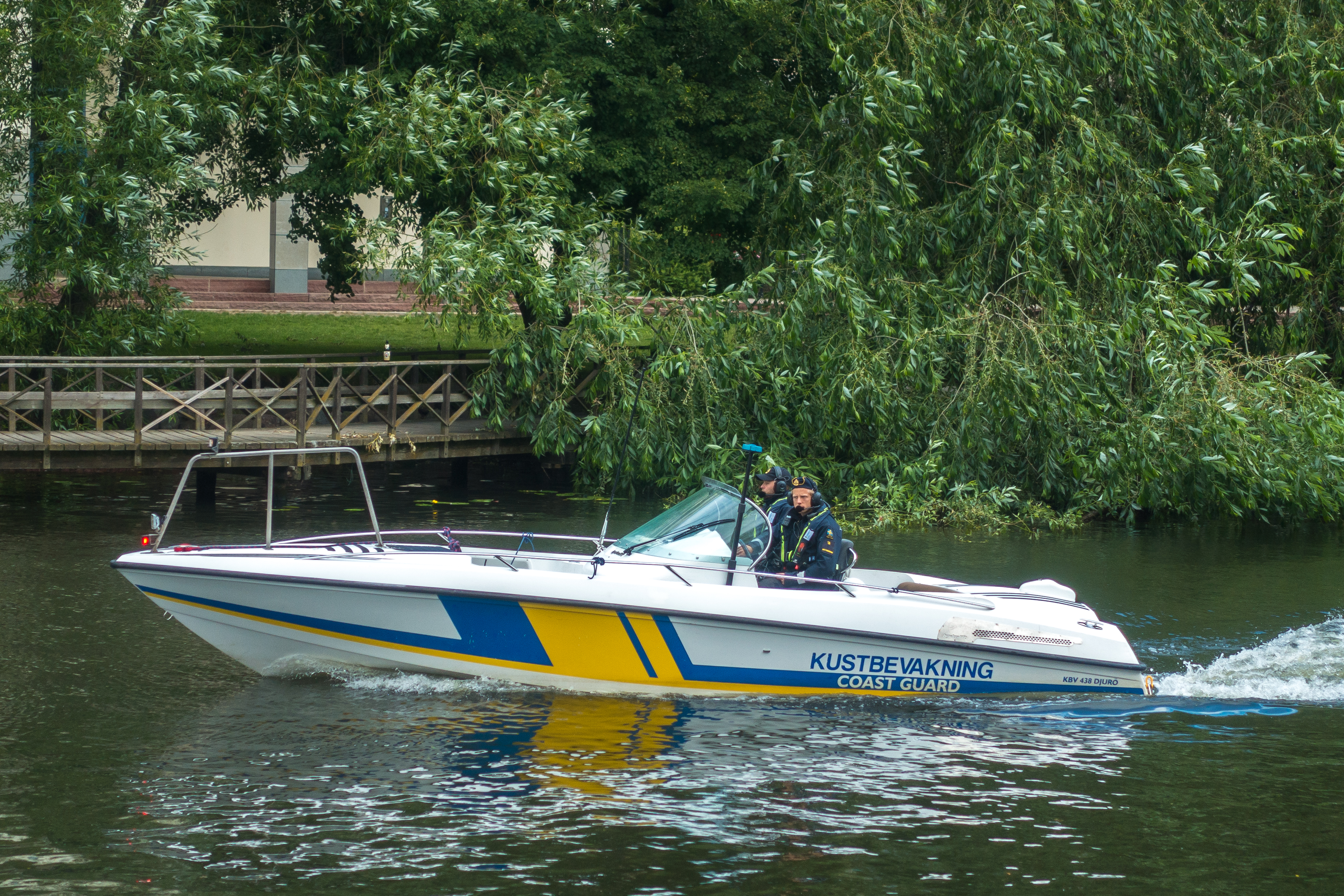
KBV 438 Djurö, one of the Coast Guard's high-speed boats of the Hydrolift S-24 type

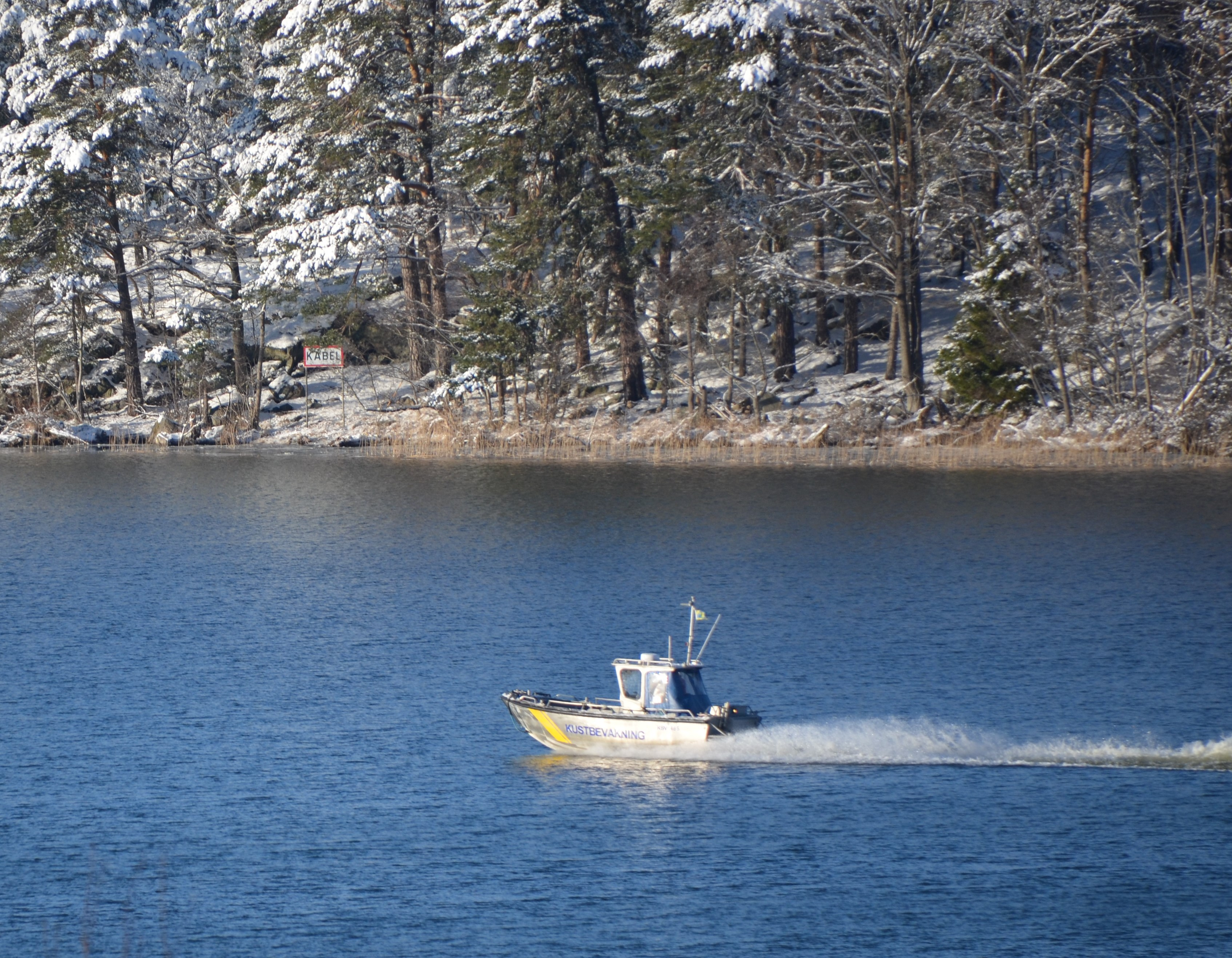
Workboat KBV 465

The coastguard also have around 100 smaller boats, some of these are daughtercraft to the bigger ships. The boats are divided into four groups: high-speed boats of the Cobra type, RHIBs, work boats and beach fighters.

Jet skis are also used.

== Hovercraft ==
Since 2015, the Coast Guard has had four hovercraft, KV 590, KV 592, KV 594 and KV 595. The two larger ones are based in Luleå (590) and Umeå (592) and the two smaller ones are based in Vaxholm (594) and Gryt (595).

== Barges ==
The Coast Guard has a larger barge used for storage of captured oil. The barge is called KBV 866 and is stationed in Härnösand

== Future ships ==
The Coast Guard ordered 7 patrol ships from Damen, known as the KBV 320s. It has a carbon fibre hull, and a length of 26.75 meters.
