= List of operators of the RBS 70 =

This is a list of operators of the RBS 70 (Robotsystem 70), a man-portable air-defense system (MANPADS).

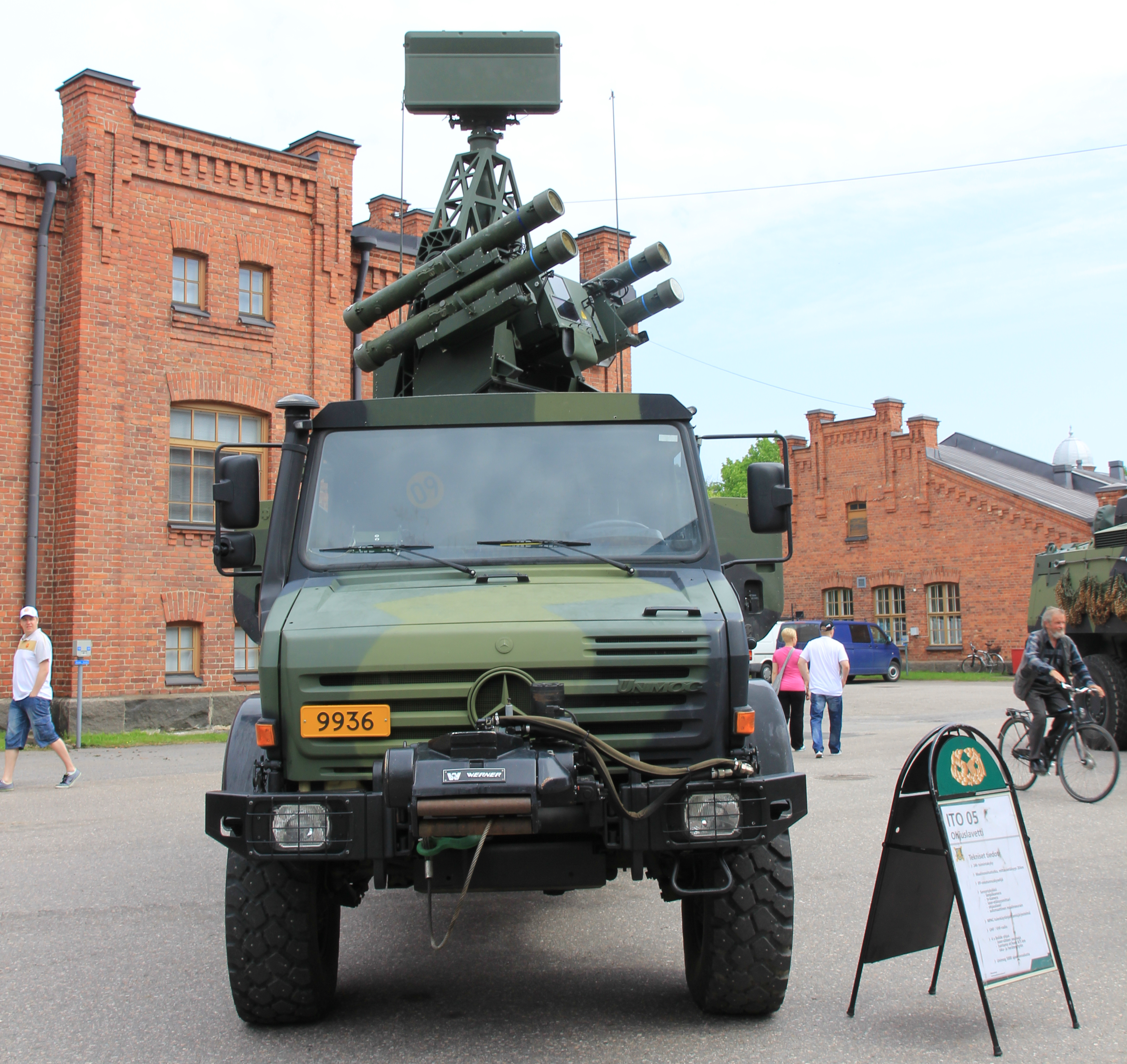
ASRAD-R / ItO 2005 on UNIMOG 5000

== Mobile air defence systems ==
=== Current systems ===
==== ASRAD-R ====
Finland (16)
The Finnish Armed Forces ordered four batteries of the ASRAD-R system, known locally as the ItO 2005 (Ilmatorjuntaohjus 05).
The order was made in August 2002, deliveries between 2004 and 2008. The contract was valued at €120 million:
- 1 battery based on the Sisu Nasu, with 4 systems by battery.
- 3 batteries based on the a UNIMOG 5000, with 4 systems by battery.
The Finnish ASRAD-R is composed of:
- a UNIMOG 5000 platform or a Sisu Nasu
- a radar from Saab, the HARD (3D, AESA, air search radar)
- a launcher with 4 RBS 70 BOLIDE missiles ready to fire

==== Saab MSHORAD ====
Czech Republic (24)
The Czech Republic ordered 24 Saab MSHORAD system in July 2025, and will be delivered in 2028-2030. The contract is valued at SEK 1.8 billion.
Each fire unit is made of 2 vehicles:
- a MARS S-330 "Mobile Firing Unit", equipped with a launcher with 3 RBS 70NG missiles ready to fire.
- a MARS S-330 "Mobile Radar Units", equipped with the GBAD C2 (command and control) system and a Saab Giraffe 1X radar.
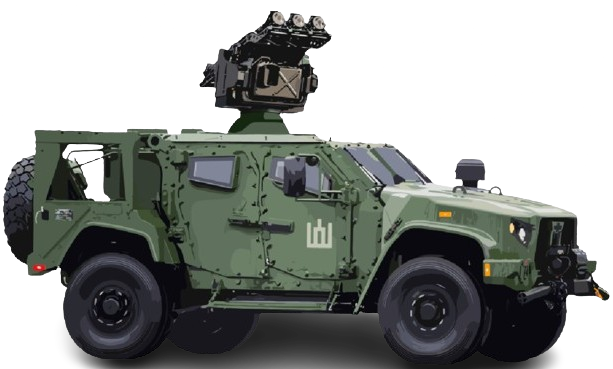
  Saab M-SHORAD launcher on the Oshkosh JLTV
Lithuania
Lithuania operates fire units made of 2 vehicles:
- an Oshkosh JLTV "Mobile Firing Unit", equipped with a launcher with 3 RBS 70NG missiles ready to fire.
- an Oshkosh JLTV "Mobile Radar Units", equipped with the GBAD C2 (command and control) system and a Saab Giraffe 1X radar.
Orders from Lithuania:
- Lithuania ordered the Saab MSHORAD system in July 2024, and will be delivered in 2025-2027. The contract is valued at SEK 1.3 billion.
- Lithuania ordered additional Saab MSHORAD systems in October 2024, and will be delivered in 2026-2029. The contract is valued at SEK 1.2 billion.
- Lithuania ordered additional Saab MSHORAD systems in December 2025, and will be delivered in 2026-2030. The contract is valued at SEK 1.4 billion.
Sweden
Sweden ordered 2 Saab MSHORAD system in January 2024, and will be delivered in 2024-2026. The contract is valued at SEK 300 million. Each fire unit is made of 2 vehicles:
- a Bv 410 "Mobile Firing Unit", equipped with a launcher with 3 RBS 70NG missiles ready to fire.
- a Bv 410 "Mobile Radar Units", equipped with the GBAD C2 (command and control) system and a Saab Giraffe 1X radar.
Sweden ordered additional Saab MSHORAD systems in 2025, and will be delivered in 2027-2028. The contract is valued at SEK 1.5 billion.
Each fire unit is made of 2 vehicles:
- a Sisu GTP "Mobile Firing Unit", equipped with a launcher with 3 RBS 70NG missiles ready to fire.
- a Sisu GTP "Mobile Radar Units", equipped with the GBAD C2 (command and control) system and a Saab Giraffe 1X radar.

==== Tripods on military vehicles ====
Pakistan
The Pakistan Army operates a RBS 70 base launcher on a pintle mount on two vehicle types:
- M113A2 APC
- Mouz APC, a APC Talha vehicle equipped with the RBS 70 launcher.

=== Potential sales ===
Thailand
Saab is collaborating with Thailand to supply a SHORAD air defence system as of April 2025.
Singapore
Saab is collaborating with Singapore to supply a SHORAD air defence system as of May 2025.

=== Retired systems ===
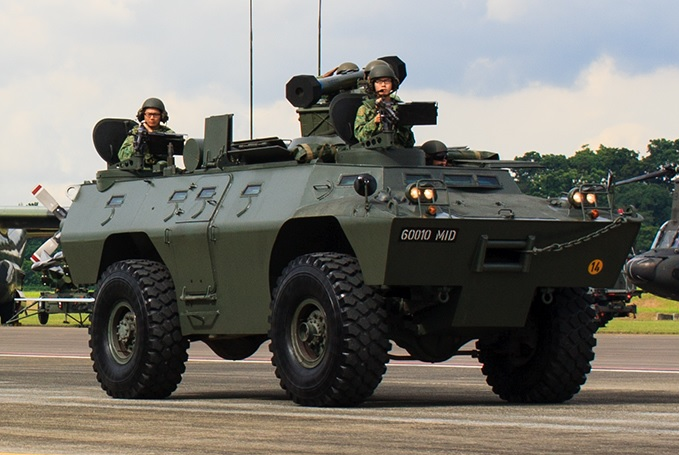
Commando V-200 - RBS 70 - Singapore

Iran
The Iranian Armed Forces used a RBS 70 launcher based on a Land Rover Defender during its war against Iraq in the 1980s. It is believed that the system caused most of the aircraft losses of Iraq.
Norway
The Norwegian Army operated the NM195 (Luftvernpanservogn), a M113A2 during the Cold War.
Singapore
The Singapore Armed Forces was operating the RBS 70 launcher on a pintle mount of its V200 Commando armored cars. The Commando fleet was retired by 2015.
Sweden (48)
The Swedish Army converted Infanterikanonvagn 103 and Infanterikanonvagn 102 into a self-propelled anti-aircraft system known as the Luftvärnsrobotvagn 701 in the 1980s. The system was used a RBS 70 on a pintle mount. The vehicles were in service from 1984 to 2000.

== MANPADS ==
=== Current operators ===
Argentina
Orders and service:
- RBS 70 introduced in the Argentinian Navy in 1984.
- RBS 70 BOLIDE in the Argentinian Navy Marine Infantry since the 1990s.
- RBS 70 NG ordered in September 2016. The contract was worth SEK 378 million (USD $44 million).
- RBS 70 NG ordered in February 2022.
Brazil
Purchases of the RBS 70 by the Brazilian Army:
- RBS 70 Mk2 missiles, missile launchers, simulators ordered in March 2014, deliveries in 2014. The contract was worth SEK 80 million.
- RBS 70 Mk2 missiles, missile launchers, simulators ordered in December 2014.
- RBS 70 ordered in March 2017, delivered in 2017-18. The contract was worth SEK 105 million.
- RBS 70 ordered in October 2017, delivered in 2018-19. The contract was worth SEK 105 million.
- RBS 70 NG ordered in January 2019.
Canada
Orders of the Canadian Armed Forces:
- RBS 70 NG ordered in February 2024, deliveries to start in 2024. The contract was worth SEK 1.8 billion (CAD $227.5 million).
This order aims at protecting the Canadian Army from aircraft and drones in Latvia.
Czech Republic
Orders:
- RBS 70 BOLIDE ordered in December 2004, delivered in 2005-07. The contract was worth SEK 204 million.
- RBS 70 NG tested by the Czech Army in November 2015.
- RBS 70 NG ordered in 2018, delivered in 2020-21. The contract was worth SEK 365 million.
- RBS 70Mk II ordered in March 2019, deliveries in 2019. The order was placed by the NSPA (NATO Support and Procurement Agency).
- RBS 70 BOLIDE (135 missiles) ordered in November 2023. The contract was worth CZK 762 million. The order was placed by the NSPA.
Finland
The MANPADS variant of the Finnish Defence Forces is known as the ItO 05M (Ilmatorjuntaohjus 05M).
The orders of the launchers and the missiles are:
- RBS 70 BOLIDE ordered in January 2007, delivered in 2008 and 2010. The contract was worth SEK 600 million.
- RBS 70 BOLIDE ordered in January 2010, delivered in 2011. The contract was worth SEK 260 million.
- RBS 70 BOLIDE ordered in December 2022, delivered in 2023-26. The contract was worth SEK 800 million (€72 million).
- RBS 70 NG ordered in August 2026- The contract was worth SEK 1.2 billion (€110 million). The order is a framework agreement enabling further orders.
Indonesia
The Indonesian Armed Forces use the RBS 70 for the SHORAD mission.
Iran
Purchase of the Iranian armed forces:
- RBS 70, around 300 missiles and 50 launchers purchased in the 1980s through Bahrain.
Ireland
Orders:
- RBS 70 ordered in 1979, delivered by 1981.
- RBS 70 missiles purchased from Norway in 2017.
- Modernisation of fire units (RBS 70 BOLIDE capable + BORC night-capability), new simulators and support ordered in June 2014 with deliveries in 2015. The contract was worth SEK 40 million.
- RBS 70 missiles ordered in June 2015, deliveries in 2015-16. The contract was worth SEK 270 million. Trials took place in September 2017 with the new missiles.
- RBS 70 BOLIDE / NG ordered in December 2018, delivered in 2019-22. The contract was worth SEK 60 million.
Latvia
Orders of the Latvian Air Force:
- RBS 70 BOLIDE ordered in November 2004, delivery in 2006-07. The contract was worth SEK 185 million.
- RBS 70 donated by Norway in November 2004.
- RBS 70 (unknown variant) ordered in October 2015, delivered in 2015-16.
- RBS 70 (unknown variant) ordered in September 2016, delivered in 2016-17.
- RBS 70 NG ordered in December 2022 with air search radars Giraffe 1X, deliveries started in 2022.
- RBS 70 NG, framework agreement signed with Saab in March 2025 for deliveries in 2026-30. The contract was worth SEK 2.1 billion.
Lithuania
The Lithuanian Armed Forces are using the MANPADS variant of the RBS 70.
The purchases are:
- RBS 70 Mk1, 21 launchers, 260 missiles, 3 simulators purchased second hand from Norway in 2004.
- RBS 70 simulators ordered in December 2016, delivered in 2018.
- RBS 70 NG, modernisation of missiles and launchers with the BORC night-capability sights ordered in August 2018, delivered in 2019. The contract was worth SEK 100 million.
- RBS 70 NG framework agreement signed in October 2022, enabling deliveries until 2026. Firm orders:
- October 2022, deliveries 2023-24. The contract was worth SEK 350 million (USD $31.4 million).
- RBS 70 BOLIDE ordered in December 2025, with deliveries in 2028-2032. The contract was worth SEK 3 billion (USD $325.1 million).
Note: orders of mobile systems have taken place with the Saab MSHORAD.
Pakistan
Orders:
- RBS 70 ordered in the 1980s, assembled locally from 1988. The contract was worth USD $91 million.
- RBS 70 BOLIDE supplied yearly to Pakistan.
Singapore
The Singapore Armed Forces was an early customer of the RBS 70.
Orders from Singapore:
- RBS 70 ordered by Singapore in the late 1970s, and entered service in the early 1980s. It was locally assembled by Bofors.
- RBS 70 BOLIDE, modernisation ordered in 1971, and in service in 2011.
- RBS 70 NG ordered in 2018, unveiled in 2020 in service with the RSAF.
Sweden
All variants have been used by the Swedish Army. Details of the orders remained confidential.
Thailand
A variant of the RBS 70 is operated by the Royal Thai Armed Forces.
Tunisia
The RBS 70 is operated by the Tunisian Armed Forces.
Orders:
- RBS 70 ordered at the Paris Air Show in 1979, delivered by 1981. The contract was worth USD $30 million, for 60 launchers and 300 missiles.
Ukraine
Missiles and missile launchers supplied to Ukraine since it has been invaded by Russia in 2022:
- Sweden: Total of 100 launchers and more than 500 missiles supplied and promised as of July 2025.
  - November 2022, Sweden decided to supply the RBS 70 to Ukraine. At the end of 2022, Sweden started to train Ukrainian soldiers on the RBS 70 system. These entered service in Ukraine in early 2023 at the same time as the Giraffe 75 radars.
  - February 2025, additional RBS 70 systems for Ukraine.
- Australia:
  - Aid to Ukraine with missiles that had been purchased since 1987 in multiple versions as they were retired in 2023 in the Australian Armed Forces. The transfer took place in 2024, it includes RBS 70 NG missiles and launchers valued at USD $50 million.
Venezuela
Orders of the Venezuelan Army:
- 1989, order for around 200 RBS 70 Mk1.
- February 1999, order worth SEK 375 million (USD $54 million), around 200 RBS 70 BOLIDE.
The missile has been shown in operation during the exercise "Independencia 200" in October / November 2025.

=== Illegal operators ===
Bahrain and United Arab Emirates
At the end of the 1970s and the early 1980s, the UAE purchased the first generation of the RBS-70 from Bofors AB in Singapore. Bofors AB was not authorised to export those missiles to Bahrain and the UAE.
A total of 300 missiles were exported to both countries.

=== Unclear operators ===
Mexico
Some information suggest that Mexico may have received 100 missiles in 1993.

=== Former operators and systems retired ===
Australia
Australia has been operating several versions of the RBS-70 from 1987 until 2023. In 2023, it was donated to Ukraine.
Orders and upgrades of the RBS 70 when it was in service in Australia:
- RBS 70 ordered in 1985, in service since 1987
- RBS 70 system ordered in May 2003, delivered by 2005 to replace the Rapier. The contract was worth SEK 450 million.
- RBS 70 BOLIDE ordered in June 2003, delivered by 2007. The contract was worth SEK 150 million.
- RBS 70 simulator ordered in August 2003.
- RBS 70 BOLIDE ordered in April 2004.
- Upgrade contract in 2016 to the pairing RBS 70 and Giraffe AMB with an IFF Mode 5. The contract was worth USD 54 million.
Norway
Formerly operated by the Norwegian Army, retired in 2004 and donated to Lithuania.
Orders and upgrades of the RBS 70 when it was in service in Norway, according to SIPRI:
- RBS 70, 110 launchers, 550 missiles ordered in 1978, delivered between 1981 and 1984. The contract was worth SEK 400 million.
- RBS 70, around 1,000 missiles ordered in 1985, delivered between 1987 and 1990. The contract was worth SEK 700 million.
- RBS 70, around 250 missiles ordered in 1987, delivered between 1989 and 1990.
- RBS 70 Mk2, around 1,000 missiles ordered in 1988, delivered between 1990 and 1992. The contract was worth SEK 500 million.
- RBS 70 Mk2, around 2,000 missiles ordered in 1989, delivered between 1991 and 1994. The contract was worth USD 124 million. Part of the production took place at the Kongsberg Våpenfabrikk.
