= List of equipment of the Swedish Armed Forces =

This is a list of the military equipment of Sweden, including the army, air force and navy.

== Small arms ==
=== Small arms and light weapons ===
Model	Swedish designation	Image	Origin	Type	Calibre	Quantity	Notes
Sidearms
Glock 17 (Gen 1)	Pist 88; Pistol 88		Austria; Sweden	Semi-automatic pistol	9×19mm Parabellum	–	Standard-issue sidearm, in the army. It succeeded to the m/07 and the Husqvarna m/40. The Pist 88 B and the Pist 88 D are both Glock 19 (Gen 2). The Pist 88 D has tritium sights.
Glock 17 (Gen 2)	Pist 88C; Pistol 88C		Austria; Sweden	Semi-automatic pistol	9×19mm Parabellum	–	Standard-issue sidearm, in the army. It succeeded to the m/07 and the Husqvarna m/40. The Pist 88 B and the Pist 88 D are both Glock 19 (Gen 2). The Pist 88 D has tritium sights.
Glock 17 (Gen 3)	Pist 88C2; Pistol 88C2		Austria; Sweden	Semi-automatic pistol	9×19mm Parabellum	–	Standard-issue sidearm, in the army. It succeeded to the m/07 and the Husqvarna m/40. The Pist 88 B and the Pist 88 D are both Glock 19 (Gen 2). The Pist 88 D has tritium sights.
Glock 19 (Gen 2)	Pist 88B; Pistol 88B		Austria; Sweden	Semi-automatic pistol	9×19mm Parabellum	–	Standard-issue sidearm, in the army. It succeeded to the m/07 and the Husqvarna m/40. The Pist 88 B and the Pist 88 D are both Glock 19 (Gen 2). The Pist 88 D has tritium sights.
Glock 19 (Gen 2)	Pist 88D; Pistol 88D		Austria; Sweden	Semi-automatic pistol	9×19mm Parabellum	–	Standard-issue sidearm, in the army. It succeeded to the m/07 and the Husqvarna m/40. The Pist 88 B and the Pist 88 D are both Glock 19 (Gen 2). The Pist 88 D has tritium sights.
Submachine guns
Heckler & Koch MP5A3	–		Germany	Submachine gun	9×19mm Parabellum	–	Used by the military police and the SOG.
Heckler & Koch MP5SD6	–		Germany	Submachine gun	9×19mm Parabellum	–	Used by the military police and the SOG.
Heckler & Koch MP7A1	Kpist 16A; Kulsprutepistol 16A		Germany	PDW	4.6×30mm HK	–	Used by the SOG.
Heckler & Koch MP7A2	Kpist 16B; Kulsprutepistol 16B		Germany	PDW	4.6×30mm HK	–	Used by the SOG.
Carabines, assault rifles and battle rifles
FN FNC	Ak 5C (Bofors); Automatkarbin 5C		Belgium; Sweden (under licence)	Assault rifle	5.56×45mm NATO	–	Standard-issue assault rifle in the Swedish Army (C variant), and shorter variant, a carabine (D variant) for CQB. Accessories: Red dot Aimpoint CS; Grenade launcher Granattillsats 40mm
FN FNC	Ak 5D (Bofors); Automatkarbin 5D		Belgium; Sweden (under licence)	Carabine	5.56×45mm NATO	–	Standard-issue assault rifle in the Swedish Army (C variant), and shorter variant, a carabine (D variant) for CQB. Accessories: Red dot Aimpoint CS; Grenade launcher Granattillsats 40mm
Sako M23	Ak 24A; Automatkarbin 24A	–	Finland; Sweden	Carabine; Barrel: 292 mm (11.5 in)	5.56×45mm NATO	7,500 (+15,000 on order)	The Ak 24A is the standard-issue carabine for non-frontline troops. Equipped with red dot: Aimpoint CompM5. Orders: 200 prototypes in 2024; 22,300 in 2024
Sako M23	Ak 24B; Automatkarbin 24B	–	Finland; Sweden	Carabine; Barrel 368 mm (14.5 in)	5.56×45mm NATO	7,500 (+15,000 on order)	The Ak 24A is the standard-issue carabine for non-frontline troops. Equipped with red dot: Aimpoint CompM5. Orders: 200 prototypes in 2024; 22,300 in 2024
Colt M4A1	Ak M4A		United States	Carabine	5.56×45mm NATO	15,000	Interim standard-issue carabine, to serve as frontline weapon, until the arrival of the Ak. 25.
LWRC M6 IC	M6IC		United States	Carabine	5.56×45mm NATO	–	Used by the SOG, it replaced the HK G36C and G36K.
Heckler & Koch HK417	–		Germany	Battle rifle	7.62×51mm NATO	–	Used by the SOG.
Machine guns
FN Minimi	Ksp 90; Kulspruta 90		Belgium	LMG	5.56×45mm NATO	–	
FN Minimi Para	Ksp 90B; Kulspruta 90B		Belgium	LMG	5.56×45mm NATO	–	
FN Minimi modernised Para	Ksp 90C; Kulspruta 90C		Belgium	LMG	5.56×45mm NATO	–	
FN MAG	Ksp 58D; Kulspruta 58D		Belgium	GPMG	7.62×51mm NATO	–	
FN MAG	Ksp 58C; Kulspruta 58C	–	Belgium	Coaxial machine gun	7.62×51mm NATO	–	Used with the Strf 9040C, D and E.
Rheinmetall MG3A1	Ksp 94; Kulspruta 94		Germany	Coaxial machine gun	7.62×51mm NATO	–	Used with the Strv 122 / Strv 123.
FN M2 HB QCB	KSP 88 - Tksp 12.7 mm Kulspruta 88 - Tung Kulspruta 12,7 mm		Belgium; Sweden (under licence)	HMG	12.7×99mm NATO	–	Used with the following weapon stations: Vapenstation 01 (Kongsberg Protector Nordic); Vapenstation 02 (Saab Trackfire)Complementary order in September 2025 to equip the Patria 6×6 (delivery 2026 - 2028).
Dillon Aero M134D	KSP 18B; Kulspruta 18B		United States	Rotary machine gun	7.62×51mm NATO	–	For use by the amphibious battalion.
Precision rfles
Heckler & Koch G3A3	AK 4 D Automatkarbin 4D		Germany; Sweden (under licence)	Semi-automatic, DMR	7.62×51mm NATO	–	Standard issue DMR in the Swedish Army. Accessories: Aimpoint CompM5; Aimpoint 3×MAG; Kikarsikte 09
Heckler & Koch HK417	–	(illustration)	Germany	Semi-automatic, DMR	7.62×51mm NATO	–	Used by the SOG.
L96A1 AW	PSG 90B; Prickskyttegevär 90		United Kingdom	Bolt-action sniper rifle	7.62×51mm NATO	–	In service since 1991. Accessories: Telescopic sight Hensoldt 10×42 ZF 500 (Kikarsikte 90B)
L96A1 AW	PSG 90B; Prickskyttegevär 90		United Kingdom	Bolt-action sniper rifle	7.62×51mm NATO	–	Accessories: Telescopic sight Schmidt & Bender 3-12×50 PM II (Kikarsikte 11)
Sako TRG M10	Psg 23A; Prickskyttegevär 23A		Finland	Bolt-action sniper rifle	7.62×51mm NATO, or 8.6×70mm	–	Accessories: Telescopic sight Hensoldt 3,5-26×56; Scope mount Spuhr i Dalby AB SP-6002 whit LRF interface A-0230
Sako TRG-42	Psg 08; Prickskyttegevär 08		Finland	Bolt-action sniper rifle	8.6×70mm	–	In use since 2008 by the Rangers and the SOG.
Anti-material rifles
Barrett M82A1	Ag 90C; Automatgevär 90C		United States	Anti-material rifle	12.7×99mm NATO	–	In service since 2005, replacing the former variants (Ag 90A and Ag 90B). Accessories: Telescopic sight 90B (Hensoldt 10×42 mildot); Image intensifier AG 90B
Barrett M107	Ag 90D; Automatgevär 90D		United States	Anti-material rifle	12.7×99mm NATO	–	Accessories: Telescopic sight Hensoldt 3,5-26×56; Scope mount Spuhr i Dalby AB SP-6002.
Shotguns
Remington 870	Förstärkningsvapen 870C		United States	Pump action shotgun	12 gauge	–	Used for breaching purposes.
Remington Model 11-87	Hagelgevär 11-87		United States	Pump action shotgun	12 gauge	–	Used for breaching purposes.
Beretta Silver Pigeon	Hagelgevär 686	–	Italy	Lever- action shotgun	12 gauge	–	
Grenades and grenade launchers
Colt M203	40 mm Granattillsats		United States	Under barrel grenade launcher	40×46mm LV	–	Underbarrel grenade launcher for the AK5.
Mk 19 Mod3	Grsp 92; Granatspruta 92		United States	Automatic grenade launcher	40×53mm HV	–	Accessories: Fire control system: Aimpoint FCS 13-RE; Red dot sight: Våpensmia VSM 015
Man-portable anti tank systems
Saab AT4	Pskott m/86 Pansarskott m/86		Sweden	Disposable recoilless gun	84 mm	–	
Carl Gustaf M3	Grg m/86 Granatgevär m/86		Sweden	Reusable recoilless rifles	84 mm	–	
Carl Gustaf M4	Grg m/18 Granatgevär m/18		Sweden	Reusable recoilless rifles	84 mm	–	Succeeds to the M/48, and gets new munitions (HE 448). Equipped with the FCD 558 sight.
Bofors Bill	RBS 56; Robot System 56		Sweden	ATGM	150 mm	–	It was retired between 2013 and 2021, and reactivated with the threat of Russia increasing.
Bofors Bill 2	RBS 56; Robot System 56		Sweden	ATGM	150 mm	–	It was retired between 2013 and 2021, and reactivated with the threat of Russia increasing.
NLAW	RB 57; Robot 57		Sweden; United Kingdom; Switzerland	ATGM	150 mm	–	Orders: 2,000 in 2005; 3,000 in December 2022. Some of the missiles were donated to Ukraine.
Akeron MP	RBS 58; Robot System 58		France; Switzerland; Sweden (under licence)	ATGM	140 mm	0 (on order)	Ordered in June 2025. Successor to the RBS 56 BILL 2 in the infantry. Planned to equip the future CV90 Mk IIIb and CV90 Mk IV.

== Army ==
=== Armoured vehicles ===
==== Tanks ====
Model	Swedish designation	Image	Origin	Type	Calibre	Quantity	Notes
Combat tanks
Strv 122; Stridsvagn 122	Strv 122A		Germany; Sweden (under licence)	MBT	120 mm L/44	99 (Note: 120 units were acquired in 1994 and 10 were donated to Ukraine in 2023. First upgraded in Strv 123A delivered in June 2026. 44 will start to be upgraded to the Strv 123A by 2026.)	A Swedish improved variant of the Leopard 2A5, of which most were built under licence in Sweden, using the Rh120 L/44 smoothbore gun. 120 purchased initially, 10 up-armoured to the Strv 122B standard, and 10 supplied to Ukraine. Contract signed for modernisation to Strv 123A standard in 2025.
Strv 122; Stridsvagn 122	Strv 122B		Germany; Sweden (under licence)	MBT	120 mm L/44	10 (Note: 120 units were acquired in 1994 and 10 were donated to Ukraine in 2023. 44 will start to be upgraded to the Strv 123A by 2026.)	A Swedish improved variant of the Leopard 2A5, of which most were built under licence in Sweden, using the Rh120 L/44 smoothbore gun. 120 purchased initially, 10 up-armoured to the Strv 122B standard, and 10 supplied to Ukraine. Contract signed for modernisation to Strv 123A standard in 2025.
Strv 123; Stridsvagn 123	Strv 123A (modernised from Strv 122 standard)		Germany; Sweden (under licence)	MBT	120 mm L/55	1 (+ 109 ordered)	Modernisation of the Strv 122 to Strv 123A standard, which includes: Rh120 L/55A1 smoothbore gun with programmable ammunitions; New optics and communication systems.; Added Auxiliary Power Unit. Allows the tank's electronic systems to run without the need to idle the main engine.; Modernisation contracts: October 2023, contract to modernise 44 Strv 122 for SEK 3.5 billion.; January 2025, order announced to modernise 66 Strv 122. The contract was signed in June 2025.; First delivery in June 2026.
Leopard 2A8	Strv 123B (newly produced)		Germany	MBT	120 mm L/55	0 (+44 on order)	Decision to purchase 44 new Leopard 2A8 made in January 2025.
Munitions
–	Slsgr 95; Spårljusspränggranat 95		Sweden	HE	120 mm	–	Rebuilt 120mm mortar round.
Elbit M322	Slpprj 95; Spårljuspansarprojektil 95		Israel	APFSDS	120 mm	–	
Elbit M339	Slsgr 22; Spårljusspränggranat 22		Israel	HE-MP-T tank ammunition	120 mm	–	Ordered in March 2022 (USD $27 million).
Simulators
KNDS Deutschland Leopard 2A8 simulator	Strv 123A / Strv 123B simulators	–	Germany	MBT simulators	–	0 (+ 18 on order)	Ordered in 2024. The simulator includes the Swedish C2 Mark combat management system.

==== Infantry fighting vehicles ====
Model	Swedish designation	Image	Origin	Type	Quantity	Notes
Tracked IFV
CV9040 Mk I	Strf 9040A		Sweden	IFV	304	549 vehicles originally purchased, 354 of which were IFV. 50 vehicles were donated to Ukraine in 2023. Note: the 154 other CV90 are mentioned in the relevant categories.
CV9040 Mk I	Strf 9040B		Sweden	IFV	304	549 vehicles originally purchased, 354 of which were IFV. 50 vehicles were donated to Ukraine in 2023. Note: the 154 other CV90 are mentioned in the relevant categories.
CV9040 Mk I	Strf 9040B1		Sweden	IFV	304	549 vehicles originally purchased, 354 of which were IFV. 50 vehicles were donated to Ukraine in 2023. Note: the 154 other CV90 are mentioned in the relevant categories.
CV9040 Mk I	Strf 9040C		Sweden	IFV	304	549 vehicles originally purchased, 354 of which were IFV. 50 vehicles were donated to Ukraine in 2023. Note: the 154 other CV90 are mentioned in the relevant categories.
CV9040 Mk I	Strf 9040D1		Sweden	IFV	304	549 vehicles originally purchased, 354 of which were IFV. 50 vehicles were donated to Ukraine in 2023. Note: the 154 other CV90 are mentioned in the relevant categories.
CV9040 Mk I	Strf 9040D2		Sweden	IFV	304	549 vehicles originally purchased, 354 of which were IFV. 50 vehicles were donated to Ukraine in 2023. Note: the 154 other CV90 are mentioned in the relevant categories.
CV9040 Mk I	Strf 9040E		Sweden	IFV	304	549 vehicles originally purchased, 354 of which were IFV. 50 vehicles were donated to Ukraine in 2023. Note: the 154 other CV90 are mentioned in the relevant categories.
CV9035 MkIIIC	Strf 9035 MkIIIC		Sweden; Netherlands	IFV	0 (+ 50 on order)	Ordered in December 2024 to replace the 50 CV90 donated to Ukraine. BAE Systems AB D-series turret with: 1 × Bushmaster III autocannon (35 × 228 mm); 2 × RBS 58 ATGM; 1 × pod with a MAG 58C (7.62×51mm NATO)
Simulators
KNDS Deutschland CV90 simulator	Strf 9040D simulator	–	Germany	IFV simulator	0 (+ 3 on order)	To be delivered in 2028; Includes a cabin each for the driver and for the turret crew. The Swedish command and information system is part of the simulation system.
KNDS Deutschland CV90 simulator	Strf 9040D simulator	–	Germany	Exit simulator	3	Three simulators to practice the exit of the vehicle exist. It enables to practice the exit in all conditions, including if the vehicle rolls.

==== Armoured vehicles ====
Model	Swedish designation	Image	Origin	Type	Quantity	Notes
Wheeled platforms
Patria AMV	Ptgb 360; Pansarterrängbil 360		Finland	APC; 8×8	79	113 Patria AMV ordered in 2010, in service since 2014. Variants ordered: 79 Ptgb 360, armed with a VS01 (Kongsberg Protector Nordic); 16 Stripatgb 360, with a high roof; 11 Sjtppatgb 360, armed with a VS01 (Kongsberg Protector Nordic)
Patria AMV	Stripatgb 360; Stridslednings-pansarterrängbil 360		Finland	C2; 8×8	16	113 Patria AMV ordered in 2010, in service since 2014. Variants ordered: 79 Ptgb 360, armed with a VS01 (Kongsberg Protector Nordic); 16 Stripatgb 360, with a high roof; 11 Sjtppatgb 360, armed with a VS01 (Kongsberg Protector Nordic)
Patria AMV	Sjtppatgb 360; Sjukvårdstrans-portpansarterrängbil 360		Finland	Armoured ambulance 8×8	11	113 Patria AMV ordered in 2010, in service since 2014. Variants ordered: 79 Ptgb 360, armed with a VS01 (Kongsberg Protector Nordic); 16 Stripatgb 360, with a high roof; 11 Sjtppatgb 360, armed with a VS01 (Kongsberg Protector Nordic)
Patria 6×6 (Patria XA-300)	Ptgb 300 (preserie); Pansarterrängbil 300		Finland	APC; 6×6	20	Programme steps: Joined the CAVS programme in its R&D phase in 2022.; Preserie order: 20; 20 purchased in April 2023 for the Life guard Regiment.; Serial production: 415; 321 in March 2024 (all delivered by 2029).; 94 in December 2025 (delivered by 2030).; Armament: VS01 (Kongsberg Protector Nordic)
Patria 6×6 (Patria XA-300)	Ptgb 300; Pansarterrängbil 300		Finland	APC; 6×6	14 (+ 401 on order)	Programme steps: Joined the CAVS programme in its R&D phase in 2022.; Preserie order: 20; 20 purchased in April 2023 for the Life guard Regiment.; Serial production: 415; 321 in March 2024 (all delivered by 2029).; 94 in December 2025 (delivered by 2030).; Armament: VS01 (Kongsberg Protector Nordic)
Patria Pasi XA-180S	Ptgb 180; Pansarterrängbil 180		Finland	Multi-role armoured vehicle 6×6	34	168 modernised, deliveries from 2023 to 2026. 58 being modernised, contract signed in December 2025 (originally delivered in the early 2000s).
Patria Pasi XA-202S	Ptgb 202S; Pansarterrängbil 202S		Finland	Multi-role armoured vehicle 6×6	20	168 modernised, deliveries from 2023 to 2026. 58 being modernised, contract signed in December 2025 (originally delivered in the early 2000s).
Patria Pasi XA-203S	Ptgb 203S; Pansarterrängbil 203S		Finland	Multi-role armoured vehicle 6×6	148	168 modernised, deliveries from 2023 to 2026. 58 being modernised, contract signed in December 2025 (originally delivered in the early 2000s).
Sisu GTP	Tgb 24; Terrängbil 24		Finland	MRAP, APC; 4×4	10 (+ unknown quantity ordered)	Orders: March 2024 - unknown quantity; August 2024 - framework agreement with Finland for a common order of 260 vehicles (split unknown); November 2025, >300 vehicles ordered with Finland, delivery 2026-28.Known variants: [[Armoured personnel carrier|APC]]; [[Infantry mobility vehicle|IMV]]; CBRN, an NBC detection vehicle; See air defence section: Air defence (RBS 70 NG + Saab Giraffe 1X); C-UAS with Saab Trackfire ARES (in development / trial)
Sisu GTP	Tgb 24; Terrängbil 24		Finland	MRAP, IMV; 4×4	10 (+ unknown quantity ordered)	Orders: March 2024 - unknown quantity; August 2024 - framework agreement with Finland for a common order of 260 vehicles (split unknown); November 2025, >300 vehicles ordered with Finland, delivery 2026-28.Known variants: [[Armoured personnel carrier|APC]]; [[Infantry mobility vehicle|IMV]]; CBRN, an NBC detection vehicle; See air defence section: Air defence (RBS 70 NG + Saab Giraffe 1X); C-UAS with Saab Trackfire ARES (in development / trial)
Sisu GTP	Tgb 24; Terrängbil 24		Finland	MRAP, CBRN reconnaissance 4×4	–	Orders: March 2024 - unknown quantity; August 2024 - framework agreement with Finland for a common order of 260 vehicles (split unknown); November 2025, >300 vehicles ordered with Finland, delivery 2026-28.Known variants: [[Armoured personnel carrier|APC]]; [[Infantry mobility vehicle|IMV]]; CBRN, an NBC detection vehicle; See air defence section: Air defence (RBS 70 NG + Saab Giraffe 1X); C-UAS with Saab Trackfire ARES (in development / trial)
Sisu GTP	Tgb 24; Terrängbil 24		Finland	Unknown variants 4×4	–	Orders: March 2024 - unknown quantity; August 2024 - framework agreement with Finland for a common order of 260 vehicles (split unknown); November 2025, >300 vehicles ordered with Finland, delivery 2026-28.Known variants: [[Armoured personnel carrier|APC]]; [[Infantry mobility vehicle|IMV]]; CBRN, an NBC detection vehicle; See air defence section: Air defence (RBS 70 NG + Saab Giraffe 1X); C-UAS with Saab Trackfire ARES (in development / trial)
RG-32M Scout	Tgb 16 - Galten; Terrängbil 16		South Africa; Sweden (under licence)	MRAP, IMV; 4×4	380	Entered service in 2006. Vehicle by BAE Land Systems OMC made under licence in Sweden. Armament: VS01 (Kongsberg Protector Nordic)
ACMAT Bastion	Bastion HM		France	MRAP, IMV; 4×4	–	Delivered in 2016 to be used by the SOG. Also used by police special units.
Tracked platforms
CV90	Stripbv 90A; Stridsledningspansar bandvagn 90A		Sweden	Forward C2 vehicle	53	
Bv 206S	Bv 308		Sweden	Tracked articulated APC	17	
Bv 206S	Bv 309		Sweden	Tracked articulated APC	93	
BvS10	Bv 410		Sweden	Tracked articulated multi-role vehicle	317 (+ 236 on order)	First phase of orders: 48 ordered in 2012 with an option for 127 vehicles; 19 APC; 2 C2 vehicles; 17 logistics vehicles; 10 ambulances; 102 (from the option) ordered in December 2013 Second phase of orders (delivered by 2025): 127 ordered in May 2021; 40 ordered in December 2022Third phase - CATV programme: 236 ordered in December 2022, first delivery in September 2025

=== Indirect fire ===
==== Rocket artillery ====
Model	Swedish designation	Image	Origin	Type	Quantity	Notes
Launcher system
M142 HIMARS	–		United States; Sweden	Multiple launch rocket system	0 (+20 on order)	Deliveries planned in 2027. Planned local production of launchers and ammunitions.
Ammunition
M30A2	–		United States; Sweden	Very short-range, tactical ballistic missile	0 (+ 35 pods on order) (210 missiles)	35 pods approved by the USA in their FMS in March 2026. Planned local production of launchers and ammunitions. Range: 15 to 92 km (9.3 to 57.2 mi)
M31A2 / AW	–		United States; Sweden	Very short-range, tactical ballistic missile	0 (+ 35 pods on order) (210 missiles)	35 pods approved by the USA in their FMS in March 2026. Planned local production of launchers and ammunitions. Range: 15 to 92 km (9.3 to 57.2 mi)
Saab GLSDB	–		Sweden; United States	Rocket launched glided bomb	0 (+ unknown quantity on order)	Range: 150 km (93 mi).
M57 ATACMS	–		United States; Sweden	Short-range, tactical ballistic missile	0 (+ 20 pods on order) (20 missiles)	Potential local production. Range: 300 km (190 mi).
Support equipment
International field artillery tactical data systems	–	–	United States	Fire control and C2 system	0 (+24 on order)	
L3 harris AN/PRC-158	–		United States	Dual-channel, software-defined radio	–	
L3 harris AN/PRC-160	–		United States	HF / VHF radio	–	

==== Artillery ====
Model	Swedish designation	Image	Origin	Type	Calibre	Quantity	Notes
BAE Archer - Volvo A30D	Artillerisystem 08 - FH77BW L52		Sweden	Self-propelled wheeled howitzer	155 mm L/52	24	26 units owned as of 2024, 24 used by the Army, and 2 used by the FMV. Background: 48 purchased by Sweden (24 ordered in 2009 and 24 in 2016), delivered between 2013 and 2022.; Of the 48 (24 of which were in storage in 2023), 14 sold to the British Army in 2023, 8 donated to Ukraine in 2023.
BAE Archer - RMMV HX2 (HX44M)	Artillerisystem 08 - FH77BW L52		Sweden; Germany	Self-propelled wheeled howitzer	155 mm L/52	4 (+44 on order)	Letter of intent to purchase 24 Archer of HX2 trucks signed in June 2022. In September 2023, the quantity was increased to 48 additional Archer. The delivery is planned to start in 2025. First delivery to the FMV in April 2026. First delivery of 4 systems to the Army in August 2026.
Simulator
W5 Solutions / KNDS Deutschland - Archer exiting simulator	Artillerisystem 08 vältrigg	–	Sweden; Germany	Exiting simulator	–	0 (+1 on order)	Roll-over training simulator.

==== Mortars ====
Model	Swedish designation	Image	Origin	Type	Calibre	Quantity	Notes
Self-propelled mortar
CV90 Mjölner	Grkpbv 90; Granatkastarpansarbandvagn 90		Sweden; Slovakia	Self-propelled heavy mortar	2 × 120 mm	80	Orders: 40 Mjölner in 2016, delivered between 2019 and 2020. They were built on existing chassis that were planned for the AMOS mortar turret, but the project was cancelled in 2008.; 20 Mjölner in February 2022.; 20 Mjölner in January 2023.; Barrels supplied by Konstrukta-Defence.
Mobile mortars
120 Krh/40	Grk m/41D; 12 cm granatkastare m/41		Sweden; Finland	Heavy mortar	120 mm L/16	80	84 in service as of 2018. 80 left in 2024. Mortar made in Sweden under licence from Tampella, 219 produced. Old system still in service, it received a Hotchkiss-Brandt M-56 base plate in the 1950s, new sights were added in the 2000s.
Grk m/84	Grk m/84 8,1 cm granatkastare m/84		Israel; Finland	Infantry mortar	81 mm L/19	108	215 in service as of 2018. 108 left in 2024. System made by IMI under a licence from Tampella with a reticle 2b by Swarowski.

==== Command and observation vehicles ====
Model	Swedish designation	Image	Origin	Type	Quantity	Notes
Observation vehicles
CV90	Epbv 90A; Eldledningspansar bandvagn 90		Sweden	Forward artillery observation	34	42 purchased in the base version, 8 of which were modernised to the C standard.
CV90	Epbv 90C; Eldledningspansar bandvagn 90		Sweden	Forward artillery observation	8 (after upgrade)	8 upgraded for international missions (additional mine armour, and A/C).
Observation and command equipment
Safran MOSKITO TI™	–		Switzerland	Multifunction IR goggles (laser range finder, laser pointer, compass, inclinometers)	–	Part of a fire control system for the artillery ordered in September 2025, for the Army by spring 20256. The order is worth SEK 488 million.
Safran JIM Compact™	–		Switzerland	Multifunction IR goggles (laser range finder, laser pointer, GPS, inclinometers)	–	Part of a fire control system for the artillery ordered in September 2025, for the Army by spring 20256. The order is worth SEK 488 million.
Safran STERNA	–		Switzerland	Goniometer	–	Part of a fire control system for the artillery ordered in September 2025, for the Army by spring 20256. The order is worth SEK 488 million.

=== Engineering vehicles ===
==== Armoured combat engineering vehicles ====
Model	Swedish designation	Image	Origin	Type	Quantity	Notes
AEV 3 Kodiak	ingBv 120; Ingenjörbandvagn 120		Switzerland; Germany	AEV	6	Based on Leopard 2A4 that were used to train the Swedish tankers before the Strv 122 entered service.
CV90 AEV	Pipbv 90D; Pionjärpansarbandvagn 90	(illustration)	Sweden; Norway	AEV	1 (+29 on order)	Collaboration between BAE Systems AB and Rytek A/S, 30 vehicles ordered in 2022. Based on the Stridsfordon 90A. Modifications: Structural changes: turret removed, new superstructure, door replaced with hydraulic ramp, room for a six soldiers and their equipment (pioneer group); RCWS; Pioneer equipment: 10 dozer blades; 20 surface mine ploughs

==== Recovery vehicles ====
Model	Swedish designation	Image	Origin	Type	Quantity	Notes
Recovery
Büffel ARV (BPz 3)	Bgbv 120; Bärgningsbandvagn 120		Germany	ARV	14	12 Bgbv 120, 2 Bgbv 120B.
CV90	Bgbv 90; Bärgningsbandvagn 90		Sweden	ARV	24	
Scania P124 6×6, -98	Bgtgb 20T; Bärgningsterrängbil 20T		Sweden	6×6 ARV	–	
Scania P124	Bgtgb 20/27TM; Bärgningsterrängbil 20/27TM 8×8	–	Sweden	8×8 heavy ARV	–	
Scania R520 XT	8×8 20T tungbärgare	(illustration)	Poland; Sweden	8×8 heavy ARV	0 (+45 on order)	Szczęśniak Pojazdy Specjalne delivers the recovery unit.: 10 ordered in early 2025; 35 more ordered in early 2026; Equipment: Main winch: Septrac, 20 tons of pulling power; Main boom: 20 tons lifting force
Repair
CV90 ARV	DSpbv 90D; Driftstödspansarbandvagn 90	–	Sweden; Norway	Armoured repair vehicle	0 (+20 on order)	Collaboration between BAE Systems AB and Rytek A/S, 20 vehicles ordered in 2022. Based on the Stridsfordon 90A.
Patria AMV	Reppatgb 360; Reparations-pansarterrängbil 360	–	Finland	Armoured repair vehicle	7	113 Patria AMV ordered in 2010, in service since 2014. 7 in repair variant, with a workshop at the back.

==== Bridging equipment ====
Model	Swedish designation	Image	Origin	Type	Quantity	Notes
Launched bridges
Leopard 2 - Leguan	BroBv 120; Brobandvagn 120		Germany	AVLB	6	Based on Leopard 2A4 that were used to train the Swedish tankers before the Strv 122 entered service. Equipped with 14m and 26m bridges.
Pontoon bridges
GDELS Improved Ribbon Bridge	DSB 300; Däcksbro 300		Germany	Foldable pontoon bridge	4 × 200 m	Modernised former Däcksbro 200 (GDELS Ribbon Bridge) with an increased capacity. 2 sets of 150 meters DSB 200 existed and got modernised. Orders: January 2018, contract to modernise the DSB 200; April 2025, ordered newly produced GDELS IRB; Deliveries: the first was handed over in November 2015
GDELS M3 Amphibious Rig	Amfibiebro 400		Germany	Amphibious pontoon bridge	1 (+ 33 on order)	Orders: July 2022, 12 ordered with options for additional systems; Second batch of 4 Amfibiebro 400 ordered; March 2024, 9 ordered; September 2024, 9 more ordered, deliveries planned for 2025 - 2027; Deliveries: the first was handed over in November 2024
BUVI Scandinavia AB / EvoLogic Sonobot 5	–	–	Sweden	Reconnaissance unmanned surface vessel for bridging engineering forces	0 (+ unknown quantity on order)	
Temporary bridges
GDELS MAMBA	–		Germany	Temporary footbridge	–	Demonstrated at the exercise Sydfront 21.

==== Mining vehicles ====
Model	Swedish designation	Image	Origin	Type	Quantity	Notes
Skorpion 2 mine laying system	–		Germany	Mine dispersion truck	0 (+unknown quantity on order)	Ordered in June 2025, a first order worth SEK 900 million, and up to SEK 4 billion. Launchers installed on a truck, evolution of the first generation of Skorpion. It dispatches AT2+ anti-tank mines.

==== EOD / demining ====
Model	Swedish designation	Image	Origin	Type	Quantity	Notes
Scanjack 3500	Djupminröjmaskin 1T	–	Sweden	Mine clearence vehicle	–	5 purchased by Sweden, some donated to Ukraine.
DOK-ING MV-4 Mine clearance system	Truppminröjare 1B		Croatia	Remote controlled mine clearance vehicle	5	

==== Construction machines ====
Model	Swedish designation	Image	Origin	Type	Quantity	Notes
JCB HMEE	Fältarbetsfordon 16t		United Kingdom	High Mobility Engineer Excavator	21	
Caterpillar D6R XL	Bandschaktare 23T SP		United States	Armoured medium bulldozer	–	
Caterpillar D6R XL	Bandschaktare 23T	–	United States	Medium bulldozer	–	
Caterpillar D6R	Bandschaktare 18T		United States	Medium bulldozer	–	

=== Utility vehicles ===
Model	Swedish designation	Image	Origin	Type	Quantity	Notes
Tracked vehicles
Bv 206/208	–		Sweden	All-terrain carrier, articulated tracked vehicle	1,000+	Current main transport vehicle, unknown number in use, to be replaced by Bv410 to some extent. 800 being upgraded with new diesel engine and automatic gearbox
Offroad vehicles
Volvo C303	Tgb 11; Terrängbil 11		Sweden	4×4 IMV	–	Being replaced by the Iveco IDV MUV.
Volvo C304	Tgb 13; Terrängbil 13		Sweden	6×6 IMV	–	Being replaced by the Iveco IDV MUV.
Mercedes-Benz G-Class G300 CDI (W461)	Tgb 14; Terrängbil 14		Austria; Germany	4×4 multi-role vehicle	540	Orders: 105 patrol / utility vehicles in February 2011; 435 4×4 in 2013: 355 Terrängbil 141 (base variant); 80 Terrängbil 1411 SPS (mine and shrapnel protection)
Mercedes-Benz G-Class W461	Tgb 15; Terrängbil 15		Austria; Germany	6×6 multi-role vehicle	100	535 G-class ordered in 2013, among which: 100 6×6 Terrängbil 152; 1 prototype Terrängbil 151, remote-sensing off-road vehicle; Note: 90 additional purchased for the air force, listed with the air force equipment.
Iveco IDV MUV	Trupptransport PB8 IDV 4×4		Italy	4×4 IMV	>1 (+200 on order)	Framework agreement for the successor of the Tgb 11 and Tgb 13: 3,000 4×4 light multi-purpose vehicles (12 variants); Firm orders: 400 vehicles ordered un June 2023 (SEK 850 million): 200 troop transporters; 100 flat bed vehicles; 100 ambulances; 100 ambulances ordered in June 2025; Deliveries: started in June 2026.
Iveco IDV MUV	Flakbil- FLB2 IDV 4×4		Italy	4×4 logistics vehicles (flatbed)	>1 (+100 on order)	Framework agreement for the successor of the Tgb 11 and Tgb 13: 3,000 4×4 light multi-purpose vehicles (12 variants); Firm orders: 400 vehicles ordered un June 2023 (SEK 850 million): 200 troop transporters; 100 flat bed vehicles; 100 ambulances; 100 ambulances ordered in June 2025; Deliveries: started in June 2026.
Iveco IDV MUV	Sjukvårdstransportsfordon		Italy	4×4 ambulances	0 (+200 on order)	Framework agreement for the successor of the Tgb 11 and Tgb 13: 3,000 4×4 light multi-purpose vehicles (12 variants); Firm orders: 400 vehicles ordered un June 2023 (SEK 850 million): 200 troop transporters; 100 flat bed vehicles; 100 ambulances; 100 ambulances ordered in June 2025; Deliveries: started in June 2026.
Polaris DAGOR	Fjärrspaningsterrängbil		United States	4×4 Light utility vehicle	–	
Utility vehicles
Ford Ranger - XL - 2024 - double cab	–	–	United States	Pickup - utility vehicle	–	It entered service in 2024. Specifications: 4×4, 170 hp, 6-speed automatic, high/low gear, hardtop.
Chevrolet Silverado ambulance	Militärambulans 301		Sweden; United States	Ambulance	–	American made vehicle base with a Swedish-made ambulance structure, transformation and equipment (made by Ambulansproduktion i Sandviken AB).
Military police vehicles
Volvo V90 Cross Country	–	(illustration)	Sweden	Military police vehicle	–	The equipment includes the MILMAN military control system.
Motorcycles
Husqvarna 258	MC 258; Motorcykel 258		Austria; Sweden (under licence)	Dual-sport motorcycle	–	Being replaced by the Yamaha XT250.
KTM 400 LS-E/mil	MC 409; Motorcykel 409		Austria	Dual-sport motorcycle	–	
BMW F800 GS Adventure	MC 810; Motorcykel 810		Germany	Dual-sport motorcycle	100	Also used by other branches.
Yamaha XT250 Serow	MC 251; Motorcykel 251		Japan	Dual-sport motorcycle	0 (+1,000 on order)	Framework agreement signed in 2025 for up to 2,500 motorcycles to replace the MC 258. Orders: 1,000 in May 2025

=== Equipment for vehicles ===
Model	Swedish designation	Image	Origin	Type	Calibre	Quantity	Notes
Weapon stations
Bofors Lemur	VS90; Vapenstation 90		Sweden	RCWS	7.62×51mm NATO (FN MAG / Ksp 58)	–	Used with variants of the CV90: Epbv 90D - forward artillery observation; Bgbv 90D - armoured recoveryTested on a variant of the CV90: Strf 9040D - IFV prototype to be modernised
Kongsberg Protector Nordic	VS01; Vapenstation 01		Norway	RCWS	7.62×51mm NATO (FN Minimi - Ksp 90, or FN MAG / Ksp 58); 12.7×99mm NATO (M2 Browning / Ksp 88); 40×53mm HV (Mk 19 Mod3 / Grsp 92)	–	Used with the: Patria AMV (Ptgb 360); Patria XA-203 (Ptgb 203B); RG-32 Scout (Tgb 16); BAE Archer (Artillerisystem 08); AEV 3 Kodiak (IngBv 120); BvS10 (Bv410); New orders: March 2024 for the 321 Patria 6×6 (Ptgb 300).; December 2025 for the new CV90 (SEK 400 million).
Saab Trackfire	VS02; Vapenstation 02		Sweden	RCWS	–	–	Used mainly with the Swedish Navy on the CB90 NG (Stridsbåt 90HSM). Being also tested as an anti-FPV drone by the FMV for the Swedish Army.
Camouflage
Saab Barracuda	MCS; Mobile Camouflage Systems		Sweden	Multispectral camouflage nets	–	–	Framework agreement signed in May 2023. First order for vehicles used in missions abroad (Strv 122B, Strf 9040C, TGB 16, etc).

=== Logistical vehicles ===
==== Vehicles ordered after 2014 ====
Model	Image	Origin	Type	Quantity	Notes
RMMV HX	–	Austria; Germany	8×8 hooklift	330	
RMMV HX	–	Austria; Germany	8×8 flatbed	330	
RMMV HX	–	Austria; Germany	6×6 flatbed	330	
RMMV HX	–	Austria; Germany	6×6 heavy tractor unit (Dragbil 23 MAN)	330	
Scania G460	–	Sweden	6×6 13T Boxtruck	155	80 ordered in October 2023.
Scania G460	–	Sweden	6×6 14T hooklift	100	
Scania G460	–	Sweden	4×4 7T flatbed	300	
Scania P460		Sweden	6×4 14T hooklift	200	200 purchased between 2022 and 2023.
Scania R620 XT	(illustration)	Sweden	8×4 30T heavy tractor unit	1 (+ 124 on order)	Semi-truck design: Truck with a 16-liter V8 Scania engine, 620 hp, R-serie crew-cab; 120-ton capable truck, transporter for the Strv 122 / 123.; 2 winches, 60 meters cables, and 20 ton towing capacity.Orders: 65 in autumn 2025; 60 in December 2025First delivery in December 2025, all delivered by January 2027.
Scania hybrid	–	Sweden	4×2 hybrid truck	3	
Volvo FMX 400		Sweden	4×2 8T boxtruck	40	40 purchased between 2022 and 2023.
Volvo FMX 480		Sweden	4×4 6T box truck (lifting table)	120	120 ordered in October 2023.
Volvo FMX 480		Sweden	6×6 12T flatbed with crane	30	30 purchased between 2022 and 2023.
Volvo FMX 480		Sweden	8×6 12T hooklift with crane	35	35 purchased between 2022 and 2023.
Volvo FMX 480		Sweden	6×6 14T flatbed (FLB14 6×6 LY S VO/T)	425	125 purchased between 2022 and 2023. 300 ordered in 2025, delivery starting in 2026.
Volvo FMX 520	–	Sweden	8×4 28T heavy tractor unit	6	6 purchased between 2022 and 2023.
Volvo FH 480	–	Sweden	8×2 7T with 78 ton/meter crane	8	8 ordered in October 2023.
Volvo FH 500	–	Sweden	8×4 17T hooklift	12	12 purchased between 2022 and 2023.
Volvo FH 500	–	Sweden	6×2 16T swap-body	3	3 purchased between 2022 and 2023.
Volvo FH 500	–	Sweden	6×2 23T tractor unit	5	
HMK Bilcon Volvo	–	Denmark; Sweden	Tank truck + trailer	–	Truck capacity: 19 m^{3} (5,000 US gal); Trailer capacity: 38 m^{3} (10,000 US gal)

==== Vehicles before 2014 ====
Most Vehicles are older and will be replaced by the new trucks above

- Scania PRT-range:
  - Scania P124 6×6 hook lift
  - Scania P124 8×8 protected, hook lift
  - Scania P124 (med Stridsfordonstransportsläpvagn 25 ton)
- Scania SBA111
- Volvo FMX
- Volvo FM12 6×6 hook lift
- Scania T144 (Dragbil 23T, used with the Stridsvagnstransportpåhängsvagn 796 tank trailer modernised in 2026)

=== Communications ===
==== Future communication systems ====
Model	Swedish designation	Image	Origin	Type	Quantity	Notes
Telenor Maritime - CNHF radio	–	–	Finland; Sweden	Manpack radio	–	Order in August 2025.

=== Personal equipment ===
==== Camouflage ====
Model	Variant	Image	Origin	Pattern type	Environment / colours	Quantity	Notes
Camouflage
M90	M90		Sweden	Splinter camouflage	Temperate climate / northern-central Europe green	–	
M90	M90K; M90 Öken kamouflage		Sweden	Splinter camouflage	Arid / desert	–	Anti-sand flies and mosquito treatment (permethrin). Arid and desert variant (warm greys, beige, browns), used in Afghanistan.
M90	M90TR BE; M90 Tropik Beige	–	Sweden	Splinter camouflage	Desert	–	Desert variant with lighter colours, focused on desert operations. Used by the Army in Mali.
M90	M90 Snö		Sweden	Splinter camouflage	Winter / Snow	–	
MultiCam	–		United States	Disruptive pattern camouflage	Universal	–	Used by the SOG since 2016.

=== Unmanned aerial systems ===
Model	Swedish designation	Image	Origin	Type	Role	Quantity	Notes
Nordic Wing Astero	–	–	Denmark	Fixed-wing mini UAV	ISTAR	0 (+ unknown quantity ordered)	Collaborate with the Patrullroboten Raptor 2 and shares targeting data.
Nordic Wing Raptor 2	Patrullroboten	–	Denmark	Fixed-wing mini UAV	Attack drone	0 (+ unknown quantity ordered)	Collaborate with the Nordic Wing Astero and is the effector of the system.

== Swedish armed forces equipment ==
This section lists equipment used by more than one force.

=== Small boats ===
Model	Swedish designation	Image	Origin	Type	Quantity	Notes
Patrol boats
Zodiac Milpro FC 470 EVOL 7	FC-båt	–	France; Sweden; Norway	RHIB patrol boat	48	Boat developed by Svekon, Frydenbø Marine AS and the FMV, commissionned in 2020. It is used by the Army and the Navy. It succeeds to the Patrullbåt 51.

=== Air defence systems ===
Model	Swedish designation	Image	Origin	Type	Range	Quantity	Notes
Air defence canonns
CV90 SPAAG	Lvkv 9040A; Luftvärnskanonvagn 9040A		Sweden	SPAAG	4 km (2.2 nmi)	27	
CV90 SPAAG	Lvkv 9040C; Luftvärnskanonvagn 9040A		Sweden	SPAAG	4 km (2.2 nmi)	3	
Tridon Mk2	–		Sweden	C-UAS, SPAAG	4 km (2.2 nmi)	0 (+ unknown quantity on order)	USD $180 million worth order in April 2026, mounted on a 6×6 truck as an anti-drone system.
Saab Trackfire ARES	–	–	Sweden	C-UAS, SPAAG	–	0 (+ unknown quantity on order)	Order to Saab of the Trackfire system for drone air-defence, based on the Sisu GTP and the Mercedes G-Class 6×6, and equipped with a Giraffe 1X radar, and armed with the M230LF (30×113mm) and the FN MAG 58 (7.62×51mm NATO).
MANPADS systems
RBS 90	RBS 90; Robotsystem 90		Sweden	MANPADS	7 km (3.8 nmi)	–	
RBS 70 NG	RBS 70; Robotsystem 70		Sweden	MANPADS	Range: 8 km (4.3 nmi); Altitude: 6,000 m (20,000 ft)	–	Missile already in service, with complementary order in 2025 worth SEK 1.5 billion.
PPZR Piorun	RBS 102; Robotsystem 102		Poland	MANPADS	Range: 6.5 km (3.5 nmi); Altitude: 4,000 m (13,000 ft)	–	Undisclosed number ordered in 2025, first delivery in January 2026.
MSHORAD - RBS 70NG
RBS 70 MSHORAD	–	–	Sweden; Finland	V/SHORAD fire units	–	–	2 Saab MSHORAD system in January 2024, to be delivered in 2024-26, valued at SEK 300 million. Fire unit made of: 1 Bv 410 "Mobile Firing Unit", with a launcher with 3 RBS 70NG; 1 Bv 410 "Mobile Radar Units", with the Saab GBAD C2 (command and control) system and a Saab Giraffe 1X radarSaab MSHORAD systems ordered in 2025, to be delivered in 2027-2028, valued at SEK 1.5 billion. Fire unit made of: 1 Sisu GTP "Mobile Firing Unit", with a launcher with 3 RBS 70NG; 1 Sisu GTP "Mobile Radar Units", with the Saab GBAD C2 (command and control) system and a Saab Giraffe 1X radar
RBS 70 MSHORAD launcher	–	(same system, different vehicle)	Sweden; Finland	V/SHORAD launch vehicle	–	–	Launcher with 3 RBS 70 Bolide missiles.
Saab Giraffe 1X	KRR	–	Sweden; Finland	Mobile 3D multi-mission radar / command	75 km (40 nmi)	0 (+10 on order)	Ordered in August 2024, vehicle equipped with Saab GBAD C2 command system and the radar. Radar installed on TGB24 / Bv 410.
RBS 70 Bolide	RBS 70; Robotsystem 70		Sweden	Surface-to-air missile	Range: 8 km (4.3 nmi); Altitude: 6,000 m (20,000 ft)	–	Missiles to equip the system. Missile already in service, with complementary order in 2025 worth SEK 1.5 billion.
SHORAD - BAMSE
BAMSE	RBS 23; Robotsystem 23		Sweden	SHORAD fire units	Range: 20 km (11 nmi); Altitude: 15,000 m (49,000 ft)	–	6 missiles BAMSE per fire unit. Entered service in 2008.
Kongsberg GBADOC	–	–	Norway	Operation center and command-and-control unit	–	–	
IRIS-T SLS
IRIS-T SLS	EldE 98; Luftvärnsrobotsystem 98	–	Germany; Sweden	SHORAD fire units	Range: 12 km (6.5 nmi); Altitude: 8,000 m (26,000 ft)	2	Orders: 2013: first order; November 2025, 8 fire units ordered; 8 Giraffe 1X; 16 IRIS-T SLS Starter launchers
IRIS-T SLS	Lvrbs 98; Luftvärnsrobotsystem 98	–	Germany; Sweden	Launch vehicle	Range: 12 km (6.5 nmi); Altitude: 8,000 m (26,000 ft)	2	Trailer with a rear foldable 4 × missiles launcher. Missile: IRIS-T (same as the air-to-air variant)
IRIS-T SLS	LvNorr		Germany; Sweden	Command and radar unit	–	2	Command vehicle Bv 410 with radar Giraffe 1X and Saab MSHORAD command system.
Saab Giraffe 1X	KRR	–	Sweden	Mobile 3D multi-mission radar / command	75 km (40 nmi)	2	
IRIS-T SLM
IRIS-T SLM	–		Germany	Short / medium range air defence fire unit	Range: 40 km (22 nmi); Altitude: 20,000 m (66,000 ft)	0 (+7 on order)	Ordered in June 2025, delivery mid-2028 to mid-2030.
Airbus Fortion IBMS-FC	–		Germany	Fire control unit / command and control	Range: 40 km (22 nmi); Altitude: 20,000 m (66,000 ft)	0 (+7 on order)	Ordered in June 2025, delivery mid-2028 to mid-2030.
IRIS-T SLM launcher	–		Germany	Launch vehicle	Range: 40 km (22 nmi); Altitude: 20,000 m (66,000 ft)	0 (+21 on order)	Ordered in June 2025, delivery mid-2028 to mid-2030.
IRIS-T SLM missile	–		Germany; Sweden	Surface-to-air missile	Range: 40 km (22 nmi); Altitude: 20,000 m (66,000 ft)	–	Ordered in June 2025, delivery mid-2028 to mid-2030.
Hensoldt TRML-4D	–		Germany	Air surveillance and target acquisition radar, GaN, AESA	Range: 250 km (130 nmi); Altitude: 30,000 m (98,000 ft)	0 (+2 on order with options)	Ordered in June 2025, delivery mid-2028 to mid-2030.
Patriot PAC-3+
MIM-104 Patriot PAC-3+	LvS103; Luftvärnssystem 103		United States	Medium / long range air defence system fire unit	–	4	Ordered in 2018.
M903 Patriot PAC-3+ launchers	–		United States	Missile launchers	–	12 (3 per fire unit)	
AN/MPQ-65	–		United States	Air surveillance and target acquisition radar, GaN, AESA	–	4	
AN/MSQ-132 engagement control station	–	–	United States	Fire command center	–	4	
OE-349 Antenna Mast Group	–	–	United States	Antennas	–	9	
EPP-III Electric Power Plant (Vincorion)	–	–	Germany	Electric generator for radar unit	–	4	
Raytheon PAC-2 GEM-T	Robot 103A	–	Germany; United States	Surface-to-air missile - long range	–	100	100 missiles with the initial order, and joined a common pool to purchase the missile in 2024.
Lockheed Martin PAC-3 MSE	Robot 103B		United States	Surface-to-air missile - medium range	–	200	Purchased with the order in 2018.

=== Surveillance radars ===
==== Current radars ====
Model	Swedish designation	Image	Origin	Type	Range	Quantity	Notes
Air defence command
Saab sensors data link with air defence systems	–	–	Sweden	Data link	–	–	Link16, JREAP-C and command station to organise the air defence elements (IRIS-T / Patriot).
Passive sensors
Saab PSS - Sirius Compact R-ESM	–	–	Sweden; Finland	Sensor for radar and datalink	–	–	It can be combined with active sensors in the new Sensor System.
Short range radars
Saab Giraffe 1X	–		Sweden	Mobile, air defence and C-UAS, 3D, X-band (IEEE), AESA radar	75 km (40 nmi)	0 (+ unknown quantity on order)	Ordered in December 2025, SEK 650 million, immediate deliveries.
Saab Giraffe 75	PS-90 radar Spaningsradar 90		Sweden	Air surveillance, C-band (IEEE), PESA radar	75 km (40 nmi)	–	
Saab HARD 3D	PS-91; Spaningsradar 91		Sweden	Air surveillance, 3D, X-band (IEEE) radar	16 to 20 km (8.6 to 10.8 nmi)	–	Bv 208 vehicle.
Terma Scanter 5202	PS-640; Spaningsradar 640		Denmark	Coastal surveillance, 2D, X-band radar	48 km (26 nmi)	51	Used by the Coast Guard and the Navy on fixed radar towers since 2012.
Medium range radars
Saab Giraffe AMB - 3D	UndE 23; Underrättelseenhet 23		Sweden	AESA, 3D, C band (IEEE), surveillance / reconnaissance radar	Range: 100 km (54 nmi); Altitude: 20,000 m (66,000 ft)	8	Background of the radar. It supplies targeting data to the IRIS-T SLS system and the RBS 23 system.
Saab ARTHUR	ArtLokRRBv 2091; Artillerilokaliserings radarbandvagn 2091		Sweden; Norway	Counter-battery radar	100 km (54 nmi)	–	Based on the Bandvagn 208 chassis.
ITT LCR-2020	PS-871; Spaningsradar 871		United States	Coastal and low altitude air surveillance, 2D, C-band radar	150 km (81 nmi)	–	A modernised variant of the PS-870, entered service in 2014. Connected to the coastal surveillance system SABER-2020 as part of the REMO 870 program. Jointly owned by the Air Force and the Navy Coast Guard. To be replaced with the GM200 MM/C.
Long range radars
ITT Gilfillan - PS-861	PS-861; Spaningsradar 861	–	United States	Long-range air surveillance, fixed, 3D, S-band (IEEE) radar	450 km (240 nmi)	8	Entered in service in 2008, a modernised variant of the PS-860. It will be replaced by the TPY-4 in 2027-28.

==== Radars on order ====
Model	Swedish designation / or version	Image	Origin	Type	Calibre	Quantity	Notes
Medium range
Saab ARTHUR Mod D	–		Sweden	Counter-battery radar	0 to 100 km (0 to 54 nmi)	0 (+ unknown quantity on order)	Ordered in December 2025, SEK 1.1 billion, deliveries starting in 2027.
Saab Giraffe AMB D	–		Sweden	Mobile, multi-mission, C-band (IEEE), 3D, AESA radar	250 km (130 nmi)	0 (+ unknown quantity on order)	Ordered in June 2026, with a Saab Command, Control & Communication in a container cabin, worth SEK 1.2 billion, deliveries 2029-2030. Used for GBAD units as surveillance systems.
Saab Giraffe 4A	MRR "Medelräckviddig radar"		Sweden	Mobile, multi-mission, S-band (IEEE), 3D, AESA radar	400 km (220 nmi)	0 (+ unknown quantity on order)	Replacement of the PS-871. Ordered in June 2025, SEK 1.4 billion, deliveries 2026-27.
Thales Nederland GM200 MM/C	MRR "Medelräckviddig radar"		Netherlands	Mobile, multi-mission, S-band (IEEE), 4D, AESA,radar	400 km (220 nmi)	0 (+ unknown quantity on order)	Successor to the PS-871 radar. Ordered in April 2025, SEK 1 billion, deliveries starting in 2026. Multi-roles: counter-battery, V/SHORAD to MRAD.
Long range
Lockheed Martin TPY-4	LRR; Långräckviddig radar	–	United States	Mobile, early warning, 3D, L-band, AESA radar	555 km (300 nmi) in rotation 1,000 km (540 nmi) in stop/stare mode	0 (+ unknown quantity on order)	Replacement of the PS-861 radar. Ordered in June 2025, SEK 1 billion, deliveries 2027-28.
Thales Nederland SMART-L MM/F	SLRR "Särskilt långräckviddig radar"		Netherlands	Fixed, early warning, 3D, L-band, AESA radar	Up to 2,000 km (1,100 nmi)	0 (+ unknown quantity on order)	New capability for the Air Force. Ordered in July 2023, SEK 1 billion, first delivery in 2025.

== FMV ==
The FMV (Försvarets materielverk, the Swedish Defence Materiel Administration) operates some equipment required for its testings.

=== Testing equipment ===
The FMV is testing various air defence systems developed in Sweden.

Model	Swedish designation	Image	Origin	Type	Quantity	Notes
Weibel Scientifics 45 dB	Spårningsradarer	–	Denmark	Tracking radar / EOS precision measurement systems	2	Two radars purchased for SEK 100 million for the Vidsel test site. The system is based on a trailer.

=== Air defence ===
The FMV is testing various air defence systems developed in Sweden.

Model	Swedish designation	Image	Origin	Type	Quantity	Notes
Saab Trackfire ARES	Tgb 24 C-UAS; Terrängbil 24	–	Sweden; Finland	C-UAS, SPAAG	1	Anti-drone capability developed by Saab, equipped on the Sisu GTP. The system is mounted on a Scania military truck (6×6). It is being tested as of June 2025. Potential armament: Primary weapon: M230LF Bushmaster, 30×113mm; Secondary armament: FN MAG (Ksp 58), 7.62×51mm NATOThe M2 Browning (12.7×99mm NATO) or the Mk 19 Mod3 (40×53mm HV) might also be used as primary armament in C-UAS. Note: some Tgb 24 equipped with the Saab Giraffe 1X were ordered by the Swedish armed forces for air-defence surveillance and command, and can be used in collaboration with the Sisu GTP equipped with the Saab Trackfire ARES.
BAE Bofors TRIDON Mk2	–	–	Sweden	C-UAS, SPAAG	1	Contract signed in October 2024 between the FMV and BAE Systems Bofors for the supply of one system for development and testing. The system is mounted on a Scania military truck (6×6). It is being tested as of June 2025.

=== Aircraft of the FMV ===
Model	Swedish designation	Image	Origin	Type	Quantity	Notes
Development aircraft
Learjet 60	–	–	United States	Testing aircraft	1	To be used for development
Training aircraft
Learjet 35s	–	–	United States	Target towing, EW training	2	To be phased out.
Learjet 60	–	–	United States	Target towing, EW training	3	Used for testing.

== See also ==
- Current equipment in the Swedish Armed Forces
  - Swedish Army:
    - List of equipment of the Swedish Army
  - Swedish Air Force:
    - Current fleet of the Swedish Air Force
    - List of equipment of the Swedish Air Force
    - Weapons of the Swedish Air Force
    - List of military aircraft of Sweden
  - Swedish Navy:
    - List of active ships of the Swedish Navy
    - List of equipment of the Swedish Navy
  - Swedish Home Guard:
    - List of equipment of the Swedish Home Guard
  - Swedish Coast Guard:
    - Swedish Coast Guard ships
    - Swedish Coast Guard aviation
- Military equipment of Sweden during World War II
- Military equipment of Sweden during the Cold War

== Sources and further reading ==
- Home page of the Swedish Armed Forces
- http://www.soldf.com
