= Bamse (disambiguation) =

Bamse is a Swedish cartoon bear.

Bamse or BAMSE may also refer to:

- Bamse (dog), a Norwegian dog
- Flemming "Bamse" Jørgensen (1947–2011), Danish singer
- RBS 23 BAMSE, a Swedish anti-aircraft missile system
