= Pansarvärnsrobotbandvagn 551 =

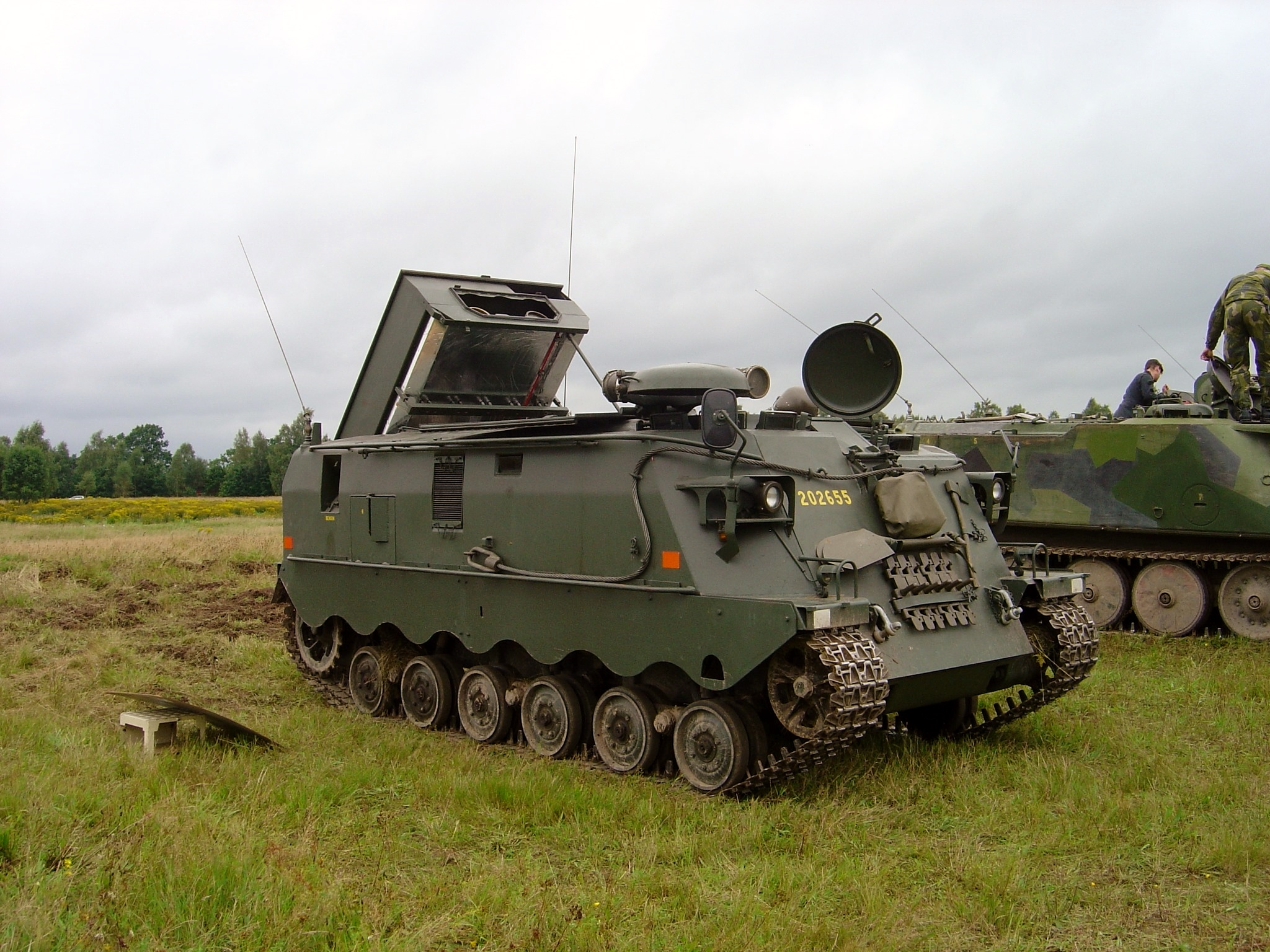
- Pansarvärnsrobotbandvagn 551
- Type: Tank destroyer
- Place of origin: Sweden

Production history
- Designer: Landsverk
- Designed: 1980
- Manufacturer: Landsverk and Hägglund & Söner
- Produced: 1984 to 1986
- No. built: 57

Specifications
- Mass: 9.7 t (21,000 lb)
- Length: 4.81 m (15 ft 9 in)
- Width: 2.54 m (8 ft 4 in)
- Height: 2.62 m (8 ft 7 in)
- Crew: 4 (commander, gunner, driver, loader)
- Main armament: BGM-71 TOW
- Secondary armament: 1 x Ksp 58 machine gun
- Engine: Ford model 2658E V-6 petrol engine 136 hp
- Suspension: Torsion bar
- Operational range: 300 km
- Maximum speed: 45 km/h (28 mph)

The Pansarvärnsrobotbandvagn 551 (pvrbv 551) was a tank destroyer developed by Landsverk and Hägglund & Söner.

== History ==
When the Infanterikanonvagn 102/103 was replaced in 1975 to 1978 with the Infanterikanonvagn 91, the Swedish Army used their chassis as the basis for a new armoured fighting vehicle with anti-tank and anti-air variants. The Pansarvärnsrobotbandvagn 551 was the anti-tank variant while the Luftvärnsrobotvagn 701 was the anti-air variant.

== Description ==
The pvrbv 551 had a new superstructure built on the old chassis. The primary armament was a BGM-71 TOW launcher, the TOW is known as the rb55 in the Swedish army. Secondary armament was a Ksp 58 machine gun. The vehicle also had a new engine and gear similar to Bandvagn 206 installed. The vehicle was operated by a crew of four. The commander and driver are seated at the front of the vehicle. The gunner and loader are located in the middle of the hull under two large roof hatches. When the pvrbv 551 goes into firing position, the hatches are opened and the TOW launcher is raised above the vehicle roof. The gunner and loader are exposed in this position.

== Production ==
The work was carried out between 1984 and 1986 at Hägglund & Söner in Örnsköldsvik and 57 pvrbv 551 were produced and served in the Swedish Army from 1984 to 2000.
