= Protolab Misu =

MiSu
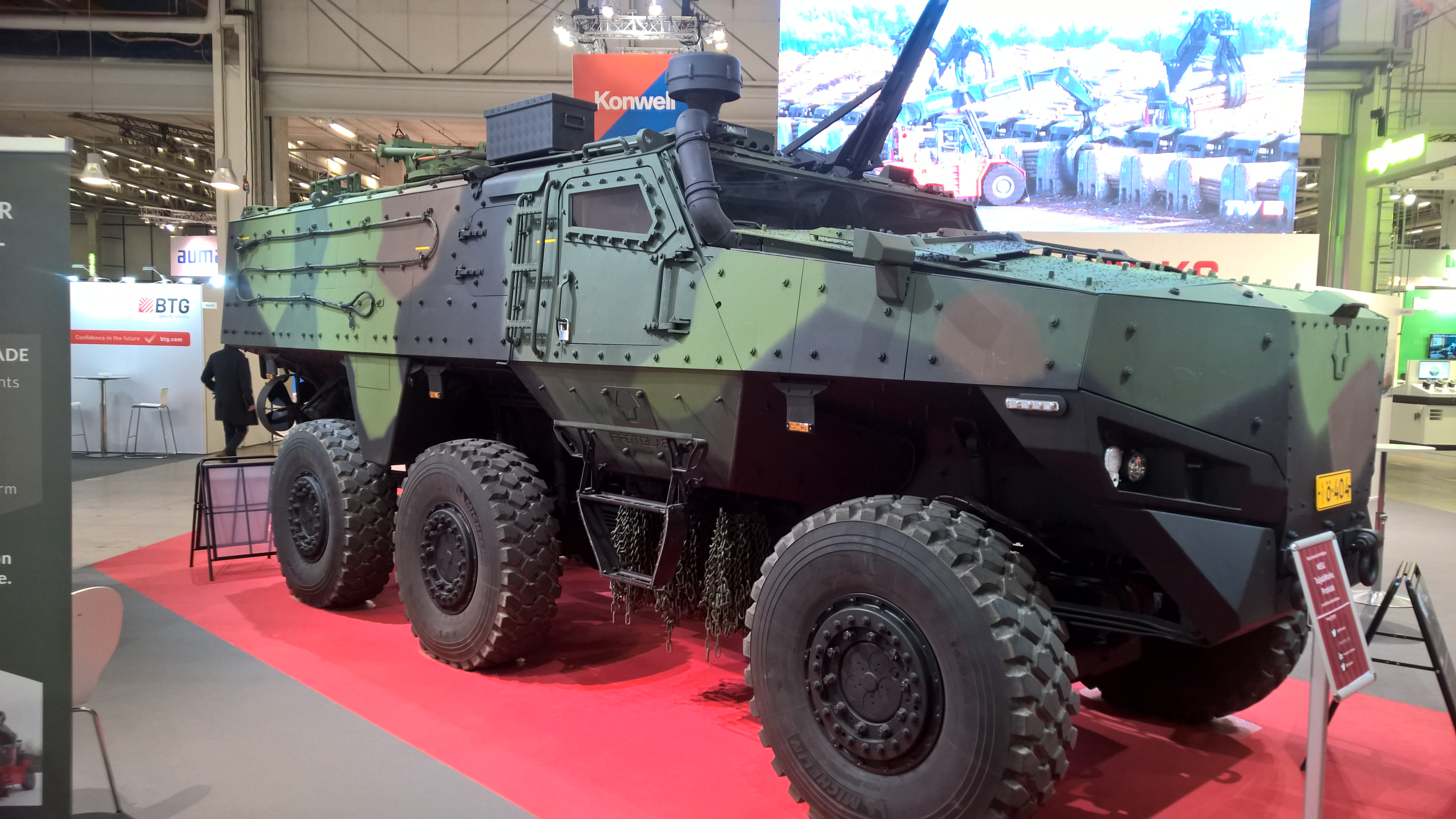
- Protected Multipurpose Vehicle PMPV 6×6 "MiSu"
- Type: Mine-Resistant Ambush Protected Vehicle (MRAPV)
- Place of origin: Finland

Specifications
- Mass: 14 tonnes (14 long tons; 15 short tons)
- Length: 7.44 m (24.4 ft)
- Width: 2.55 m (8 ft 4 in)
- Height: 2.7 m (8 ft 10 in)
- Crew: 2 (+10 passengers)
- Armor: 10 mm
- Engine: 6.7-liter Cummins diesel engine 285 hp (212 kW), max torque 980 Nm
- Power/weight: 20.35 hp/tonne
- Suspension: parabolic leaf-springs with hydraulic shock absorbers
- Operational range: 900 km
- Maximum speed: 110 km/h on land, 12 km/h in water

The PMPV MiSu is a Finnish-made six-wheeled amphibious Mine-Resistant Ambush Protected Vehicle designed for the Finnish Defence Forces as a possible replacement for its XA-180-series vehicles. The first version was produced in 2015 and test production began in 2017. It was designed to operate with ease of use, simple structure and low-cost maintenance. The basic appearance and configuration of PMPV Misu is similar to most wheeled MRAPs. The Misu is fully amphibious.

== Development ==
In 2009 Protolab Oy began planning a prototype vehicle intended as a replacement for the XA-180 vehicles used by the Finnish Army. In 2015 the first vehicle was sent out for field testing. After additional funding was received as an offset from the NASAMS deal, four vehicles are to be built. Two of these will be sent to the UK for testing the vehicle's functions against explosives. The fourth test vehicle will be the first production vehicle. In December 2017 the Finnish Defense Forces ordered 4 production vehicles.

The vehicle's nickname "MiSu" is derived from the Finnish name "MiinaSuojattu" (transl. mine-protected) and "PMPV" stands for "Protected Multi-Purpose Vehicle". The main superstructure is mainly manufactured from 6 to 12 mm of armour steel enhanced with Exote liner and the bottom is mine strengthened, the front windows are bullet-resistant. The vehicle has continuous six wheel drive and good capabilities for off-road driving. It can take inclines up to a maximum of 60%.

The vehicles are manufactured by Toijala Works in Akaa, Finland.

== Operators ==
- Finland: Finnish Army

== See also ==
Other finnish made wheeled armored vehicles

- Patria Pasi variants
- Patria 6×6, the competing offer by Patria to succeed the aforementioned Pasi
- Patria AMV
- Sisu GTP

Comparable 6x6 MRAP vehicles

- Cougar HE – (United States)
- BAE Caiman – (United States)
- Buffalo – (United States)
- RG-33 – (South Africa)
- Zastava M20 – (Serbia)
- VBMR Griffon – (France)
- Ural Typhoon – (Russia)
