= Saab Surveillance =

Saab Microwave systems is a Swedish company which was founded in 1956 as Ericsson Microwave Systems. The business was acquired by Saab and renamed in 2006. The main market for the company is in the sensor and electronic warfare field.

Its most important markets today are Europe, South Africa, Australia and the US. Saab has around 12,500 employees. Annual sales amount to around SEK 24 billion, of which research and development account for about 20 per cent of sales.

To adapt to the new conditions in the industry defence industry, Saab has divided operations since 1 January 2010 into five business areas:

- Aeronautics
- Dynamics
- Electronic Defence Systems
- Security and Defence Solutions
- Support and Services

== Notable Products ==
- Erieye - Airborne Early Warning & Control system
- ARTHUR - ARTillery HUnting Radar
- Giraffe radar - Agile Multi-Beam air defense search radar
- PS-05/A - Fighter aircraft radar
- HARD 3D (Helicopter and Aeroplane Radar Detection) radar system
