= RBS 23 =

Swedish medium range air defence system

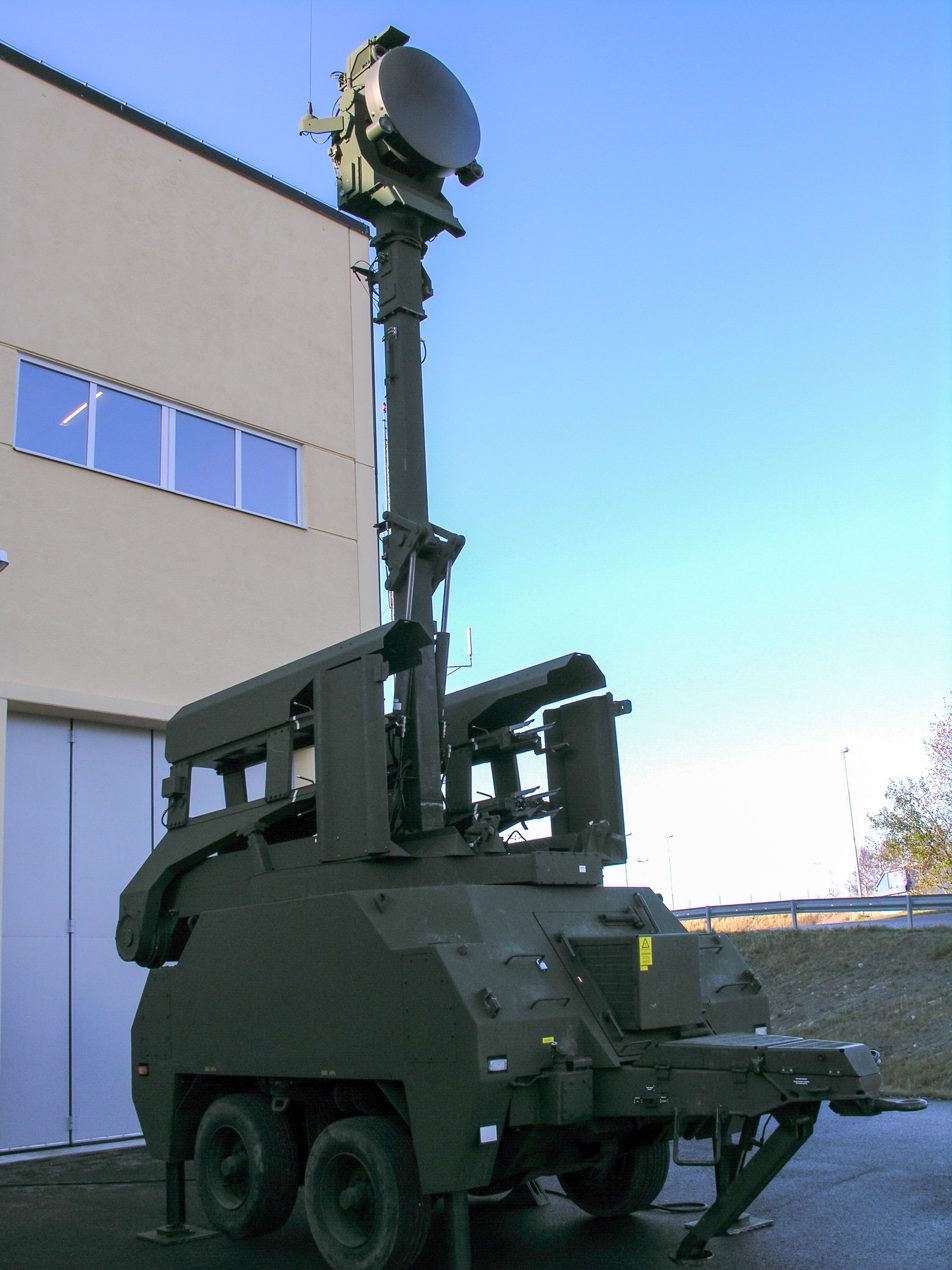
RBS 23 BAMSE

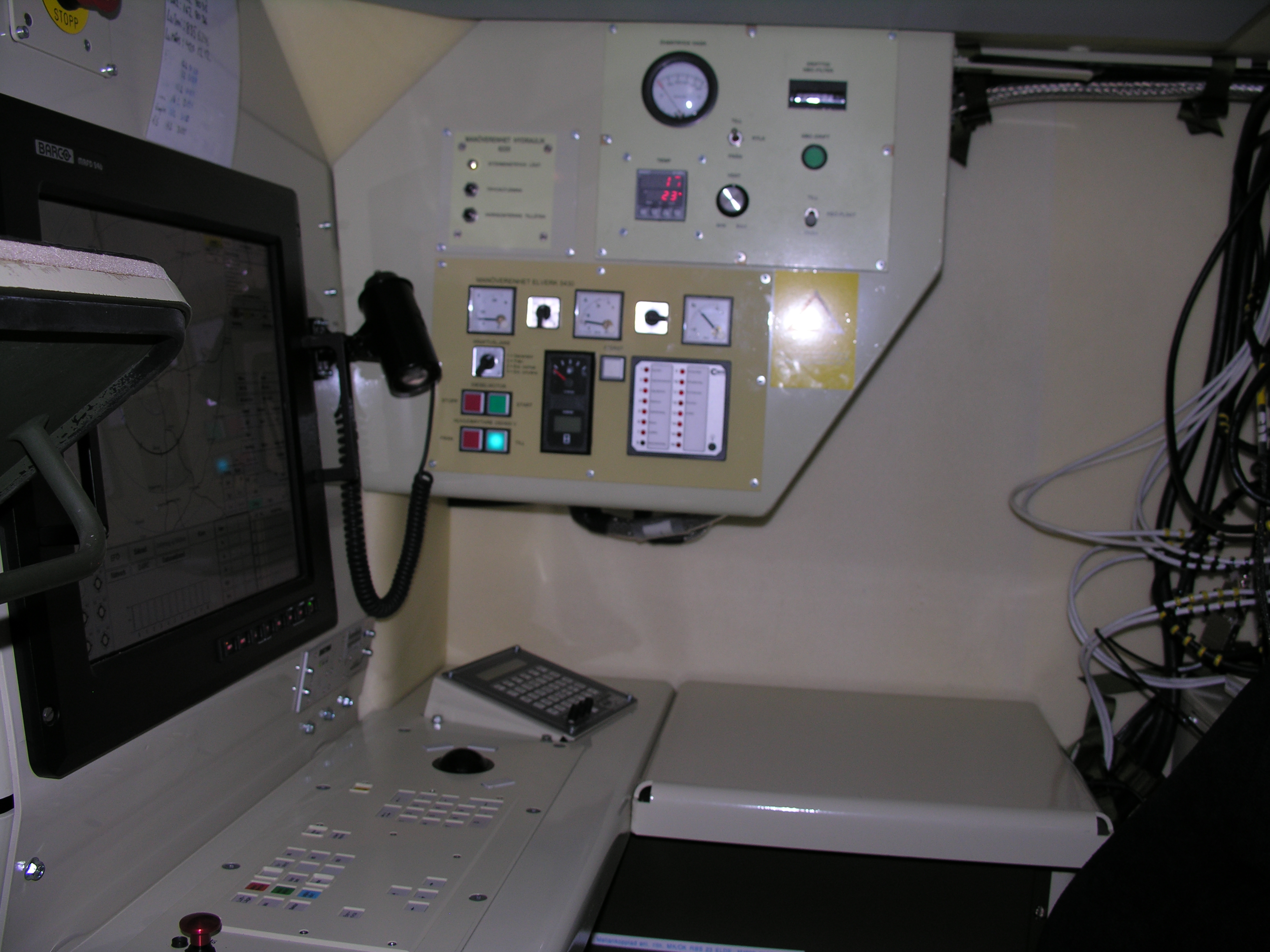
RBS 23 BAMSE interior

The RBS 23, designated BAMSE (Bofors Advanced Missile System Evaluation), is a Swedish medium range, all-weather capable air defense system developed by Bofors and Ericsson Microwave Systems (now both in the Saab group). BAMSE is designed for protection of military facilities, ground forces and high value infrastructures. It is intended to operate against very small and fast targets such as attack missiles, anti-radiation missiles, UAVs and cruise missiles. It can also engage high altitude flying targets. On their web site, Saab mention ground coverage of more than 1,500 km², altitude coverage of 15,000 m and range out to 20 km.

== Components ==
The system consists of a Surveillance and Control Center (SCC) and two to four Missile Control Centers (MCC). The missile control center trailers are located up to 20 km away from the SCC and interconnected via a cable or radio communications (up to 15 km).

=== Surveillance and control center ===
The SCC is operated by a crew of one or two. It comprises an Ericsson GIRAFFE 3D surveillance radar with an antenna mast of 8 to 13 meters. It is used for threat evaluation, combat coordination, with target acquisition, identification, tracking and prioritization. The SCC can coordinate up to four missile control centers. The system has a built-in simulation capability to carry out training.

=== Missile control center ===
The missile control center trailer depends on transportation vehicles which also carry additional missiles for reloading operations. The center is protected against fragments and nuclear, biological and chemical threats. It has two computer stations and is operated by one or two persons. It comprises a Ka-band fire control radar with an 8 meters mast, IRST (Infrared search and track for surveillance and tracking), IFF system, six ready-to-fire BAMSE missiles, and weather sensors. The MCC can be deployed in 10 minutes and complete reload of a MCC takes less than 4 minutes.

=== Missile ===
The missile used by the RBS 23 system is based on the RBS 70, but unlike its predecessor (which is laser beam rider) it is a radar command control ACLOS missile, which means that the missile itself and the target have to be tracked by the fire control radar until impact. A booster has been added also. The missile is claimed to have high acceleration and high maneuverability. It is equipped with a fragmentation and shaped charge warhead and with both a proximity fuse and an impact fuse. Range is 20 km.

== Deployment ==
The Swedish government ordered the RBS23 in 2000 and deliveries started in 2002. The Swedish Army only trained conscripts on the system in 2008, however, the system was not taken into Army use but was used as a demonstration system.

On 1 July 2019, the system was taken into Swedish Army use and a number of RBS 23 systems were placed on Gotland, under command of the new Gotland Regiment. However the system was deployed with the PS-90 search radar and not Giraffe AMB (UndE 23). This is because the Giraffe AMB units had been updated with a new data system for relaying the air picture so they can no longer talk directly to the RBS 23 fire units. The older PS-90 can both talk to the fire units and translate the modern data system to the new one, that is why the PS-90 was picked. The PS-90 lacks the height coverage of the UndE 23 (Giraffe AMB) and can't use the full altitude performance of the RBS23 missile unless it's linked into a radar which has that coverage.

== Controversy ==
The naming of the system received heavy criticism by socialist cartoonist Rune Andréasson through the Swedish Peace and Arbitration Society for using the same name as his character, the pacifistic cartoon-bear Bamse, which is popular in Sweden.

Att ge ett vapen namn associerande till en barnens figur som i decennier har stått för icke-våld, tolerans och solidaritet vittnar om en sådan omdömeslöshet, att man inte heller i övrigt kan hysa tilltro till vapenindustrin.

To give a weapon name associated with a children's character who for decades has represented non-violence, tolerance and solidarity testifies about a lack of judgement so grave, that one in no other aspects can have confidence in the arms industry.

The debate article, written by Maria Ermanno, was published in Aftonbladet on 24 January 2000 and sparked debate on the editorials and culture pages.

== Operators ==
Sweden
