= Luftvärnsrobotbandvagn 701 =

Luftvärnsrobotvagn 701
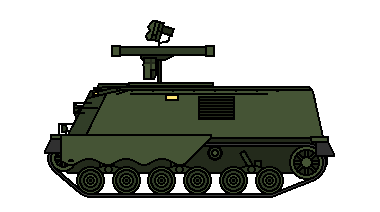
- Type: self-propelled anti-aircraft vehicle
- Place of origin: Sweden

Service history
- In service: 1980s - 2000 circa
- Used by: Swedish Army

Production history
- No. built: 49

Specifications
- Mass: 9.7 tonnes
- Length: 4.81 m
- Width: 2.54 m
- Height: 2.89 m
- Crew: 4
- Main armament: RBS-70 SAM
- Secondary armament: Ksp 58 7.62 mm machine gun 6x smoke grenade launchers
- Engine: Ford 2658E; 136 hp
- Transmission: Mercedes W 4A-018
- Ground clearance: 0.33 m
- Fuel capacity: 240 litres
- Maximum speed: 41 km/h

Luftvärnsrobotvagn 701 (abbreviated lvrbv 701) is a Swedish self-propelled anti-aircraft vehicle armed with the locally produced short range RBS 70 surface-to-air missile system. The lvrbv 701 is not NBC-protected and has no night vision equipment. Except for the armament, lvrbv 701 is identical to the Pansarvärnsrobotbandvagn 551 ATGM carrier. Both vehicles were built from the chassis of obsolete Infanterikanonvagn 103 self-propelled guns (some Pansarvärnsrobotbandvagn 551s used the Infanterikanonvagn 102 chassis instead). Conversion to the lvrbv 701 was done during the 1980s and the vehicle was taken out of active service around the year 2000.
