= Infanterikanonvagn 72 =

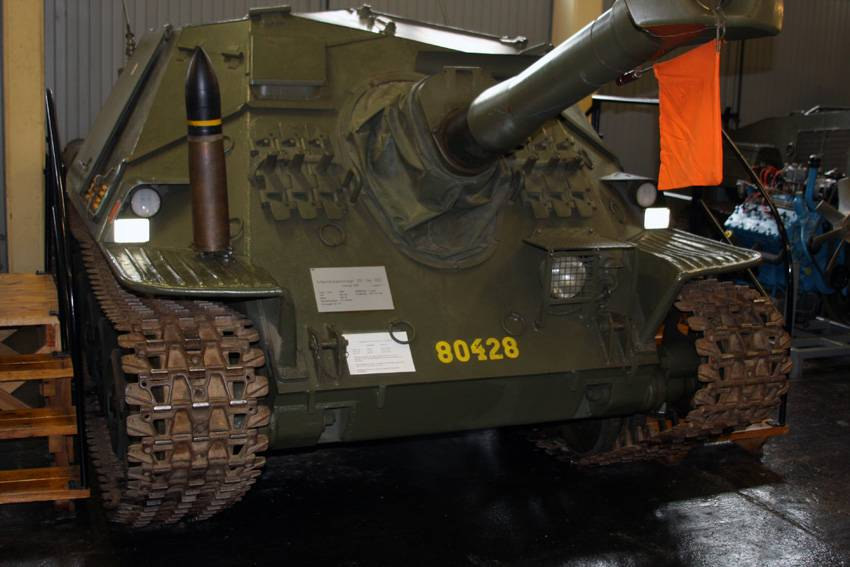
- Infanterikanonvagn (Ikv) 103
- Type: Assault gun
- Place of origin: Sweden

Production history
- Designer: AB Landsverk
- Designed: 1952
- Manufacturer: Landsverk
- No. built: Ikv 72: 36; Ikv 102/103: 36/81
- Variants: Ikv 102, Ikv 103, Pansarvärnsrobotbandvagn 551 and Luftvärnsrobotvagn 701

Specifications (Ikv 103)
- Mass: 8.8 t (19,000 lb)
- Length: 4.8 m (15 ft 9 in)
- Width: 2.23 m (7 ft 4 in)
- Height: 1.60 m (5 ft 3 in)
- Crew: 4 (commander, gunner, driver, loader)
- Armor: 20 mm hull front
- Main armament: 1x 105 mm gun
- Engine: petrol engine
- Suspension: Torsion bar
- Maximum speed: 57 km/h (35 mph)

The Infanterikanonvagn 72 (Ikv 72) is a light assault gun vehicle developed by Swedish firm AB Landsverk in the early 1950s.

It was upgraded as the Infanterikanonvagn 102 with a 105 mm gun and then through engine upgrade as the Infanterikanonvagn 103.

== History ==
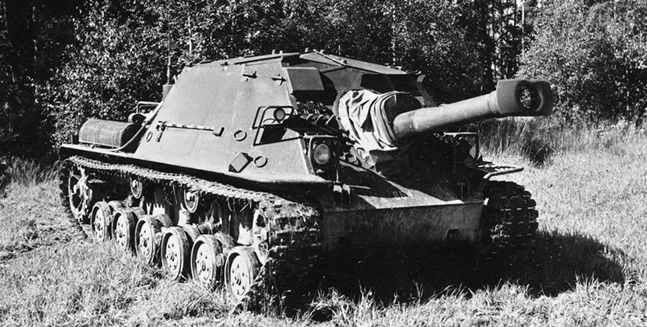
Ikv 103 with 105 mm gun and armour hatches visible

In early 1949, the Swedish Army initiated a project for an assault gun was to provide direct fire support for infantry attacks. The vehicle was intended to replace towed artillery in the infantry support role. Requirements for the new vehicle included low cost so that many vehicles can be constructed and small, lightweight design with a limit of 6 tons.

In 1952, Landsverk took part in this project.

From 1953 to 1954, 36 Ikv 72s were delivered to the Swedish Army.

== Description ==
The Ikv 72 has a casemate design with an open top superstructure at the front of the vehicle, and an engine and gearbox at the rear. An unusual feature of the Ikv 72 is that the drive wheels were placed at the rear. The weight of the vehicle was 8 tons. The Ikv 72 had a crew of four.

The gun was mounted at the front of the vehicle and gun traverse was limited to 5 degrees. Although gun caliber for the Ikv 72 was supposed to be at least 105 mm, no 105 mm gun was available then. Thus, the vehicle was armed with the 75 mm m/41 gun L/34 of the Stridsvagn m/42 as a temporary measure. The Ikv 72 fires high explosive (HE) shells.

== Variants ==
=== Infanterikanonvagn 102 ===
From 1956 to 1958, Ikv 72 was modified to Infanterikanonvagn 102 (Ikv 102). Armour hatches were attached to the top of superstructure so as to protect the crew from shrapnel and sniper fire.The 75 mm gun was replaced by 105 mm gun with a muzzle brake developed by Bofors. The weight of the vehicle was increased to 8.80 tons. In the 1960s, the Ikv 102 was given high-explosive anti-tank (HEAT) shells for defense against other armoured fighting vehicles in addition to HE shells.

=== Infanterikanonvagn 103 ===
Infanterikanonvagn 103 (Ikv 103) was a minor improvement of the Ikv 102. The Ikv 103 still retained the 105 mm gun. It received an engine upgrade and was equipped with the B42 horizontally opposed four-cylinder engine developed by Volvo Aero. Air intake was not via the crew compartment anymore, but via grills on the rear of the vehicle. The weight of the vehicle still remained at 8.80 tons.

There were attempts to export the Ikv 103 design to India and other countries. In the early 1980s, Ikv 103 was converted to Pansarvärnsrobotbandvagn 551 and Luftvärnsrobotvagn 701.
