= Sisu GTP =

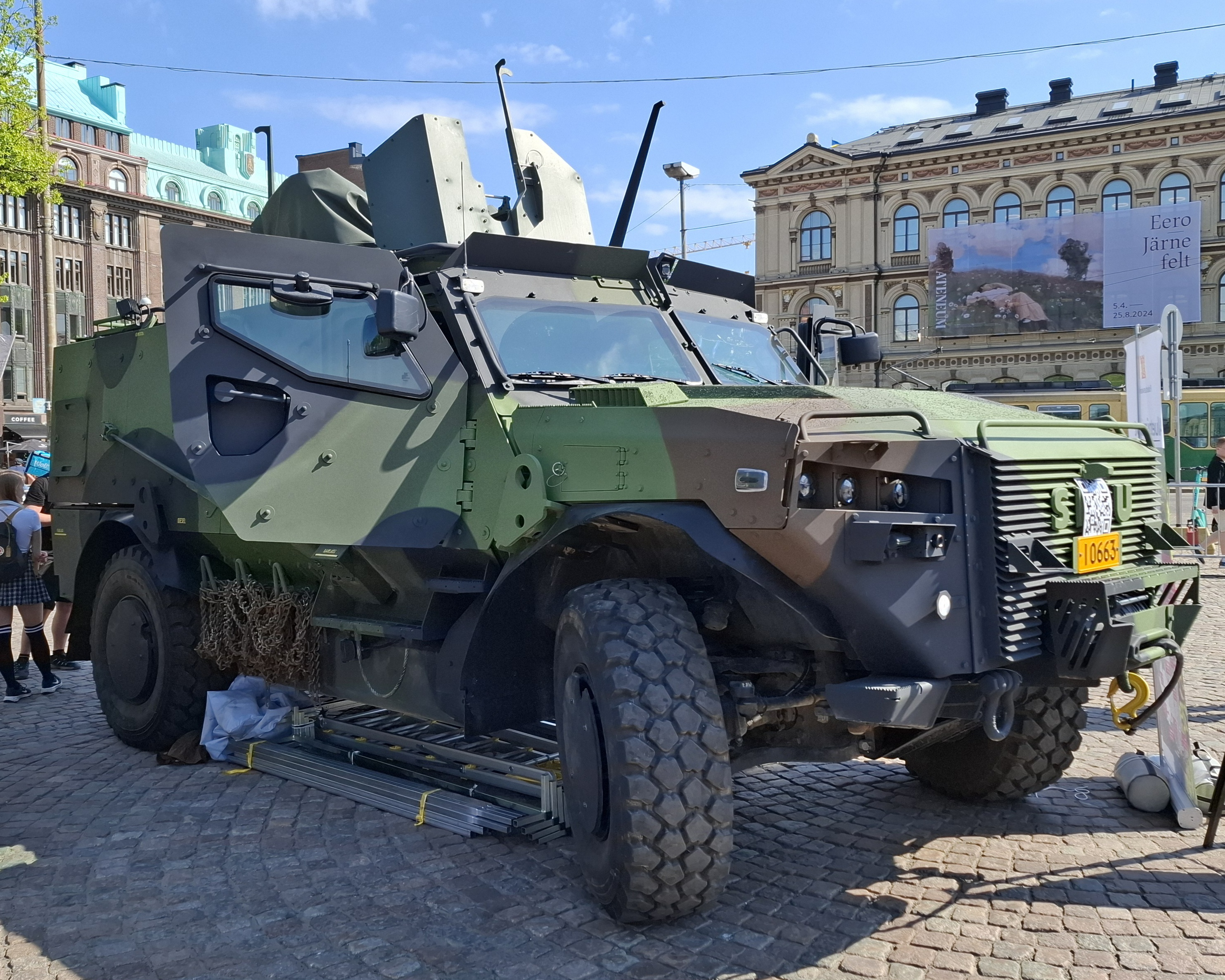
- Type: MRAP IMV
- Place of origin: Finland

Service history
- In service: 2018–present
- Used by: See Operators
- Wars: Russo-Ukrainian War

Production history
- Designed: 2018
- Manufacturer: Sisu Auto
- Produced: 2018–present
- Variants: Common chassis with bolt-on body for missions

Specifications
- Mass: 16.5 t (36,000 lb)
- Length: 6.00 m (19.69 ft)
- Width: 2.50 m (8 ft 2 in)
- Height: 2.55 m (8 ft 4 in)
- Crew: Variants: 2 (utility); 2+2, 2+3 (recon); 2+8 (APC)
- Armor: STANAG 4569 Level 1 Upgradable with respective add-on protection kit.
- Engine: Mercedes-Benz OM926, 7,2 liter 6-cylinder diesel 308 hp (230 kW) 1300 Nm
- Power/weight: 22 hp/tonne
- Payload capacity: 5.0 t (11,000 lb)
- Transmission: Allison 3500, 6-speed automatic ZF VG750 transfer case
- Suspension: Independent suspension, lockable differentials
- Ground clearance: 0.40 m (16 in)
- Operational range: Over 700 km
- Maximum speed: >100 km/h (62 mph) (land); 12 km/h (7.5 mph) (water)

The Sisu GTP is a Finnish-made four-wheeled, modular mine-resistant ambush protected infantry mobility vehicle (IMV) designed and built by Sisu Auto, although the chassis and the powertrain is based on the Mercedes-Benz Unimog. The first version was produced in 2018.

In June 2020, the Finnish Defence Forces ordered six vehicles for testing. In December 2022, the Finnish Defence Forces placed an order for an additional 25 vehicles that would replace RG-32M in Finnish service.

== Design ==
The vehicle has a chassis base with mission modules that can be changed.

It uses Texelis T700 axles with independent suspensions.

== Framework agreement FISE ==
Through the framework agreement between Finland and Sweden for defence cooperation, over 260 vehicles are planned to be produced. It includes troop transport variants, air-defence, command and control, medical care, single cab transport variants and CBRN reconnaissance.

== Operators ==
=== Current operators ===
Finland
Orders:
- 6 ordered for trials in June 2020.
- 25 serial production vehicles ordered at the end of 2022.
- 13 ordered in December 2023 for €9.7 million. The variants purchased are:
  - 9 APC
  - 4 in general purpose variant.
- Framework agreement in common with Sweden in August 2024 for 260 vehicles (split unknown).
- Order in November 2025 in common with Sweden for over 300 vehicles (split unknown), deliveries 2026-28.

Sweden (20 in service, additional on order)
Orders:
- March 2024, CBRN reconnaissance variant of the Sisu GTP ordered, unknown quantity.
- August 2024, framework agreement in common with Finland 260 vehicles (split unknown). At the same time, Sweden ordered 10 mobile short-range radars systems Giraffe 1X, go be mounted on the Sisu GTP.
- Order in November 2025 in common with Finland for over 300 vehicles (split unknown), deliveries 2026-28.
Deliveries to the Armed Forces (not the FMV):
- June 2025 (20):
  - 10 APC (2 crew + 8 passengers)
  - 10 infantry mobility vehicles (5 crew members, crew cab + bed)

Ukraine

- Undisclosed numbers of Sisu GTP used by Ukrainian Special Operations Forces. Delivered via indirect channels.

=== Failed bids ===
Latvia
Sisu GTP was evaluated against AM General HMMWV, Otokar Cobra and Paramount Marauder in 2018 and selected as winner in a tender to supply armored vehicles for Latvian armed forces. The deal, worth about 200 million euros, was canceled in 2019 after AM General and Paramount Group complained about the procurement procedure.

== See also ==
- RG-32 - Predecessor in the finnish army
- Protolab MiSu – Another Finnish origin low volume production MRAP from the same era.

Comparable modern 4x4 infantry mobility vehicle

- URO VAMTAC – (Spain)
- Iveco LMV – (Italy)
- AMZ Tur – (Poland)
- Hawkei – (Australia)
- JLTV – (United States)
- Roshel Senator – (Canada)
