= Giraffe radar =

Swedish early warning radar system family

Saab Sea Giraffe and Giraffe Radar
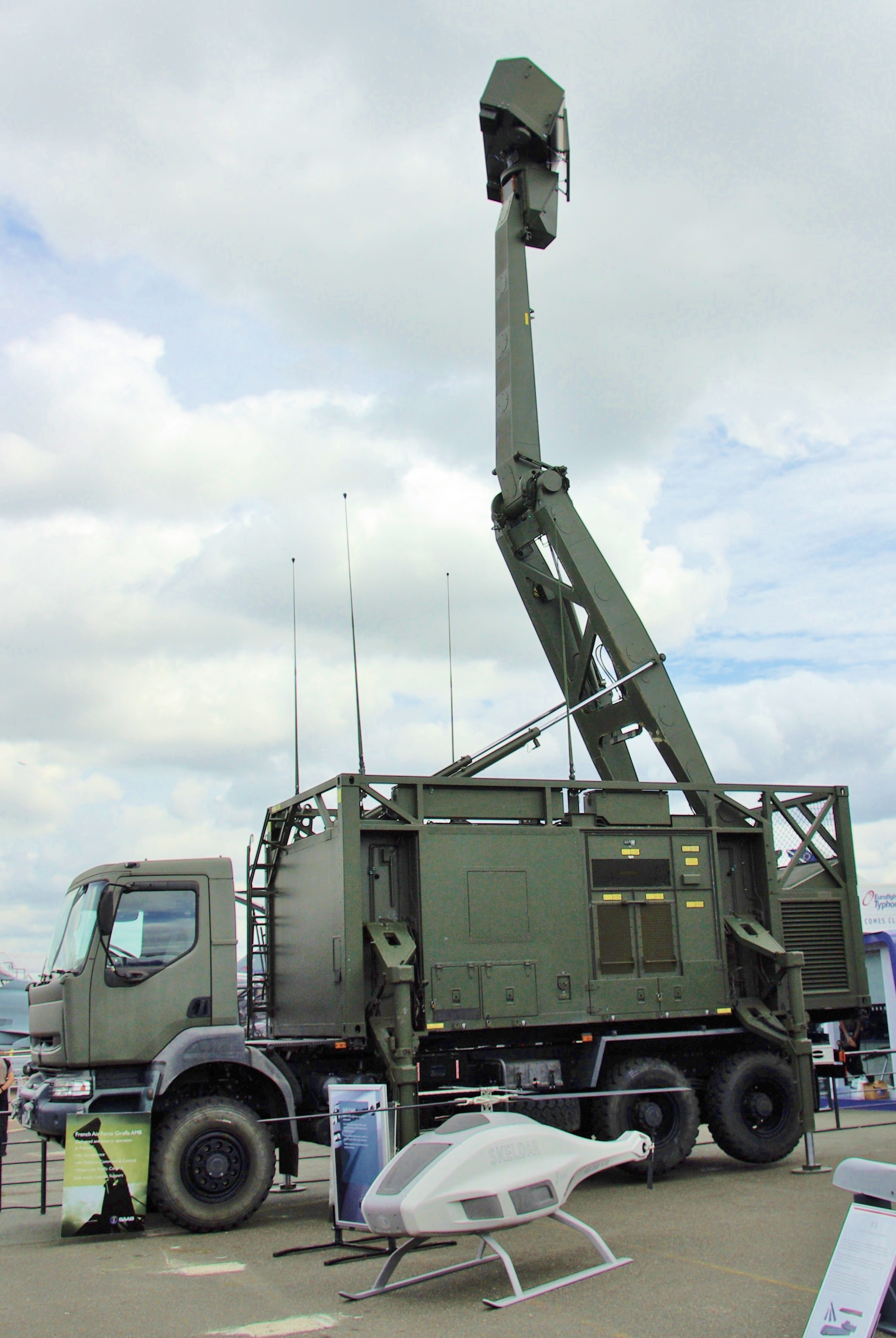
- A Giraffe AMB radar on display at the Paris Air Show, 2007.
- Country of origin: Sweden
- Introduced: 1977
- No. built: 450~
- Type: Early-warning radar
- Frequency: C band/S Band/X band
- RPM: 60
- Range: Between 10 and 470 kilometres (6.2 and 292.0 mi), depending on variant
- Altitude: Between 0 and 40,000 metres (0 and 131,234 ft), depending on variant

The Saab (formerly Ericsson Microwave Systems AB) Giraffe Radar is a family of land and naval two- or three-dimensional G/H-band (4 to 8 GHz) passive electronically scanned array radar-based surveillance and air defense command and control systems. It is tailored for operations with medium- and Short Range Air Defense (SHORAD) missile or gun systems, or for use as gap-fillers in a larger air defense system.

The radar gets its name from the distinctive folding mast which when deployed allows the radar to see over nearby terrain features such as trees, extending its effective range against low-level air targets. The first systems were produced in 1977. By 2007, some 450 units of all types are reported as having been delivered.

The Serbian Military Technical Institute purchased a licence for the Giraffe 75 and is producing a new model with several modifications. The radar is installed on the chassis of FAP 2026, and the Serbian designation is M85 "Žirafa".

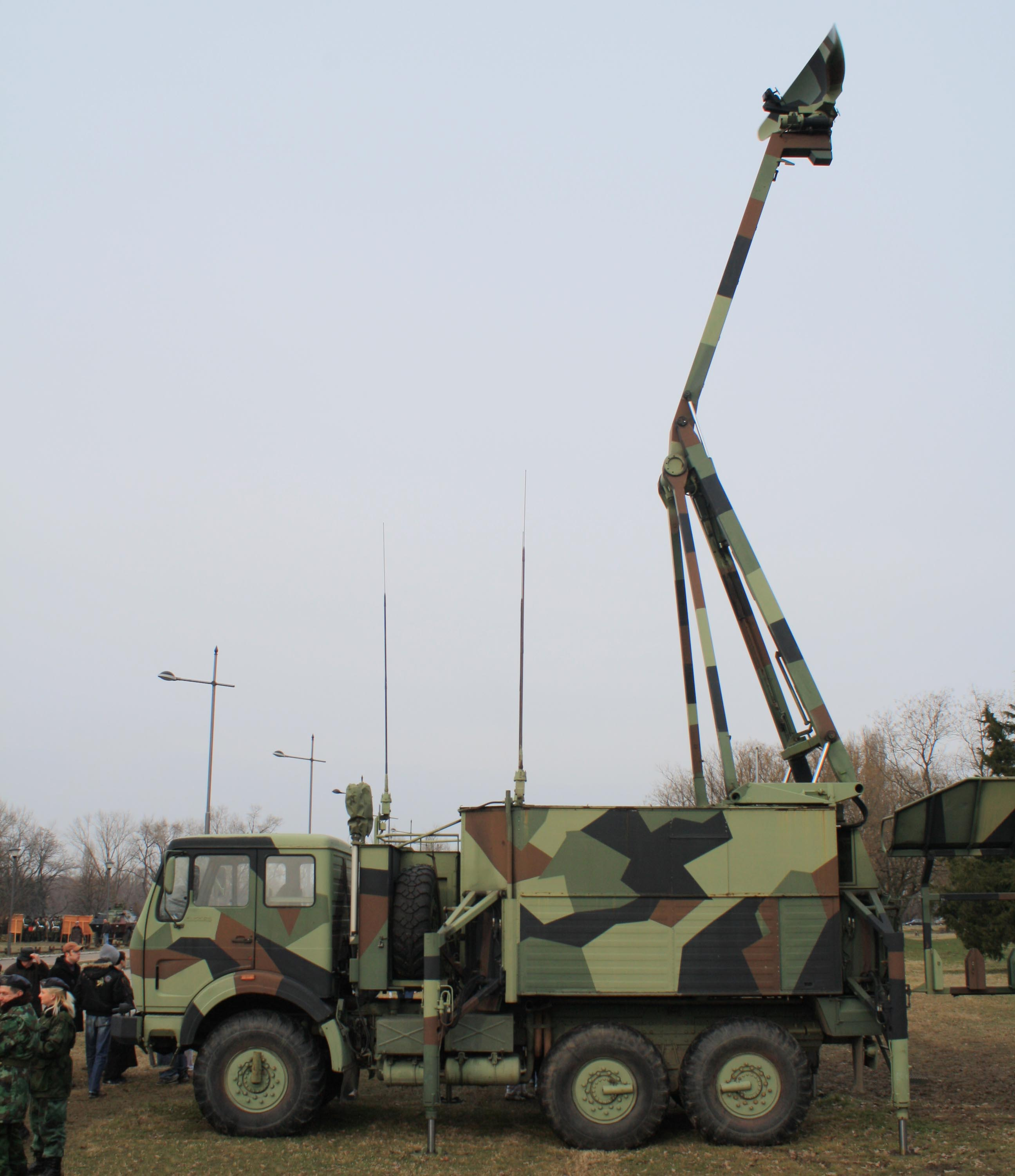
A Serbian Army M85 "Žirafa", on the chassis of a FAP 2026

Saab Electronic Defence Systems (EDS) in May 2014 unveiled two new classes of active electronically scanned array (AESA) radar—three land-based systems (Giraffe 1X, Giraffe 4A and Giraffe 8A) and two naval variants (Sea Giraffe 1X and Sea Giraffe 4A) in X- and S-band frequencies—to complement its existing surface radar portfolio.

== Description ==
Giraffe is a family of G/H (formerly C-band) frequency agile, low to medium altitude pulse doppler air search radars and combat control centers which can be used in mobile or static short to medium range air defense applications. Giraffe is designed to detect low-altitude, low cross-section aircraft targets in conditions of severe clutter and electronic countermeasures. When equipped as an air-defense command center, Giraffe provides an air picture to each firing battery, using man portable radio communication.

Giraffe uses Agile Multi-Beam (AMB), which includes an integrated Command, control and communication (C_{3}) system. This enables Giraffe to act as the command and control center in an air defense system. It can also be integrated into a sensor net for greater coverage. It is normally housed in a single 6m long shelter, mounted on an all-terrain vehicle for high mobility. The shelter can be augmented with Nuclear, Biological and Chemical protection and light layers of armor to protect against small arms and fragmentation threats.

== Variants ==
=== Passive electronically-scanned array ===
==== Giraffe 40 ====
This is a short-range (40 kilometres (25 mi) instrumented) air defense radar with command and control capability. It employs a folding antenna mast that extends to a height of 13 metres (43 ft) when deployed and can be integrated with an Interrogation Friend or Foe (IFF) capability. Coverage is stated to be from ground level to 10,000 metres (33,000 ft) in altitude. In Swedish service, the radar is designated PS-70 and PS-701. It provides target data to RBS-70 SHORADS missiles and 40 mm Bofors guns. A more powerful version with a 60 kW transmitter is known commercially as Super Giraffe, and is in Swedish service as the PS-707. These radars are no longer marketed.

==== Giraffe 50AT ====
This is the model used in the Norwegian NALLADS air defense system. It combines the radar and RBS-70 missiles with 20 mm anti-aircraft guns to provide low-level air defense for the combat brigades of the Norwegian army. Mounted on a BV-206 all-terrain tracked vehicle, this version has an instrumented range of 50 km (31 mi). The antenna extends to a height of 7 metres (23 ft). The system can control up to 20 firing units of guns or missiles or a combination of both. The Command and Control system features fully automatic track initiation, target tracking, target identification (IFF), target classification and designation, hovering helicopter detection threat evaluation and handling of "pop-up" targets. It can exchange data with Giraffe 75 or AMB systems as part of a larger network.

==== Giraffe 75 ====
This features a 13 metres (43 ft) antenna mast and is normally carried on a 6x6 5-ton cross-country truck which carries the radar and command and control shelter. The instrumented range is 75 km (47 mi) and altitude coverage extends from ground-level to 10,000 metres (33,000 ft). An optional add-on unit extends the radar's coastal defense capabilities. In Swedish service the radar is designated PS-90. In the Greek Air Force, the Giraffe 75 is used in combination with Contraves (now Rheinmetall defense) Skyguard/Sparrow fire control systems. 1 Giraffe typically controls 2 Skyguard systems, each with 2 twin 35 mm GDF-005 guns and 2 Sparrow surface-to-air missile launchers.

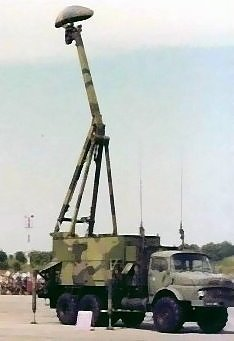
1988, a Republic of Singapore Air Force's Giraffe S 3D radar on display at Paya Lebar Air Base

==== Giraffe S ====
Optimized as a mobile radar for uncrewed remote-controlled applications as a "gap-filler" in air defense early warning systems concentrating on small, low-flying targets over a long distance. It can be employed as a coastal surveillance radar where targets are small surface vessels and sea-skimming missiles or aircraft. A new antenna extends range coverage to 180 km (110 mi), with altitude coverage from ground level to 6,000 metres (20,000 ft). The antenna mast extends to 8 metres (26 ft).

==== Giraffe AMB ====
Giraffe Agile Multi Beam is a digital antenna array radar. It provides multi-beam 3-Dimensional air coverage at 5.4 to 5.9 GHz. It has instrumented ranges of 30 km (19 mi), 60 km (37 mi) and 100 km (62 mi). The altitude coverage is extended from ground-level to 20,000 metres (66,000 ft) with 70-degree elevation coverage. The data rate is 1-scan per-second. Its maintained pulse density suppresses high cluttering in adverse weather conditions. Ultra-low antenna side-lobes combined with pulse-to-pulse and burst-to-burst frequency agility provides some resistance to jamming.

As in previous Giraffe radars, automatic hovering helicopter detection is provided, as is a rocket, artillery and mortar locating function, allowing the radar to detect incoming rounds and give 20 seconds or more of warning before impact. Giraffe AMB is the principal sensor of the Swedish RBS 23 BAMSE air defense missile system, and is available for many other applications. The Giraffe AMB can be delivered with ground surveillance options fitted. A skilled crew can deploy the radar in around 10 minutes and recover it in around 6 minutes.

The latest version, the Giraffe AMB D, was unveiled for the first time at Eurosatory 2026; it uses an AESA antenna and has a range of 250 km and is said to be ready for deployment in 3 minutes.

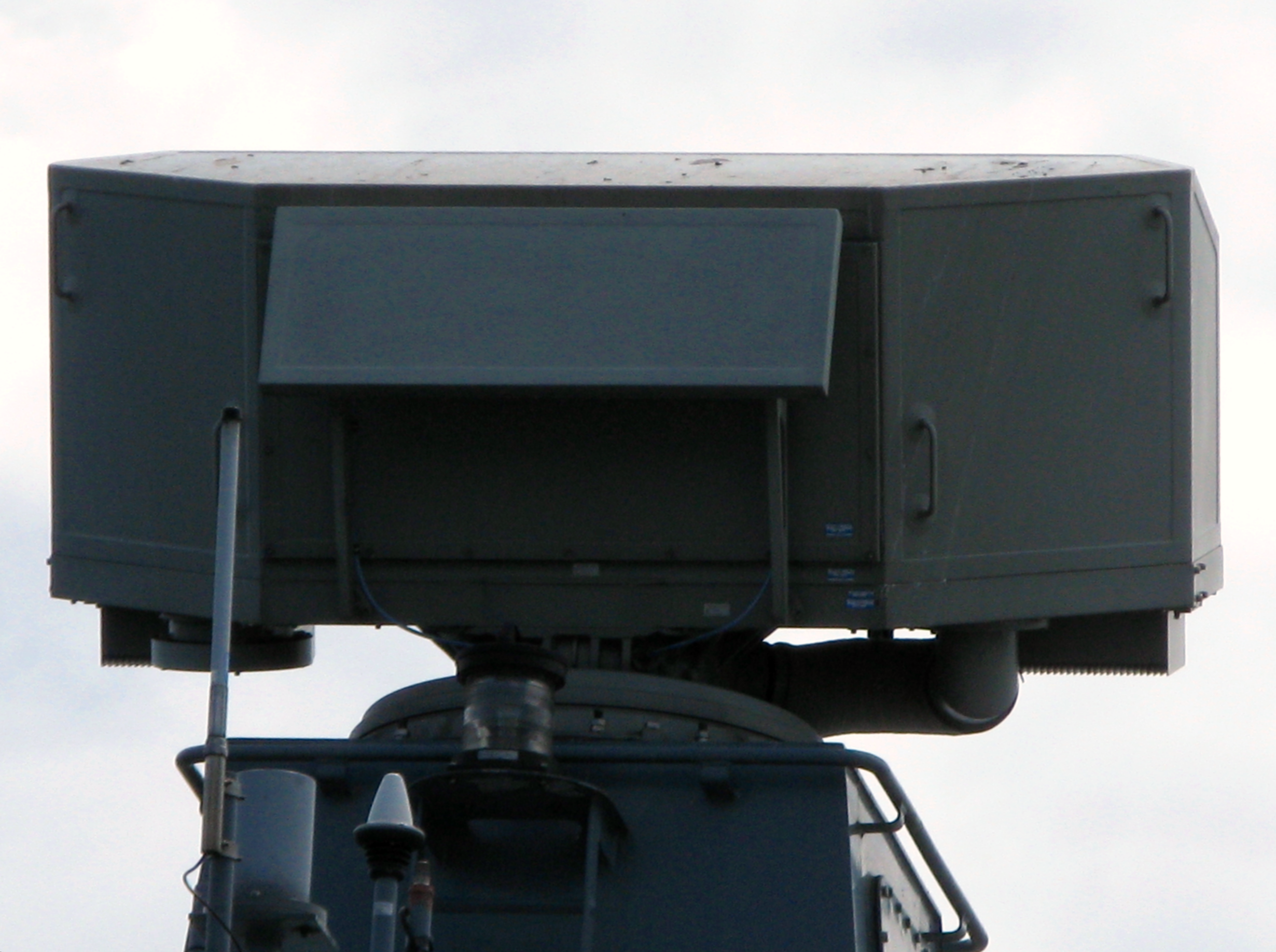
A Sea Giraffe 3-D radar on a Polish corvette

==== ARTE 740 ====
This is a coastal defense radar based on the Giraffe 75 antenna and Giraffe AMB processing system, optimized for surface and low-altitude coverage for the Swedish Amphibious Forces, formerly the Coastal Artillery. It was mounted on a MOWAG Piranha 10x10 armored vehicle. Six systems were produced, but the system was withdrawn in 2008 prior to reaching full operating capability. Four of the six units were leased to Australia and the United Kingdom for use in Afghanistan between 2008 and 2010. The systems were later reduced to spares and the radars and vehicles reused in other systems.

==== Sea Giraffe AMB ====
Saab's Sea Giraffe AMB is the naval variant of their Giraffe radar with 3D AMB technology. It can detect air and surface targets from the horizon, up to a height of 20,000 metres (66,000 ft) at elevations up to 70°. It can simultaneously handle multiple threats approaching from different directions and altitudes, including diving anti-ship missiles. It is specialized for rapidly detecting small, fast moving targets at all altitudes and small surface targets in severe clutter.

The radar has an instrumented range of 180 km (110 mi). Its roles include:

- Air surveillance and tracking
- Surface surveillance and tracking
- Target identification for weapon systems
- High-resolution splash spotting

The Sea Giraffe AMB is installed on the Republic of Singapore Navy's upgraded Victory-class corvette and US Navy's Independence class of littoral combat ships, and has the designation AN/SPS-77(V)1 for LCS 2 and 4, AN/SPS 77(V)2 for LCS 6-22, AN/SPS-77(V)3 multi-mode naval radar, and AN/SPS-77(V)4 for LCS 24 and beyond. It has also been chosen for the Royal Canadian Navy's upgraded Halifax-class frigate, and the new Protecteur-class Joint Support Ships.

=== Active electronically-scanned array ===
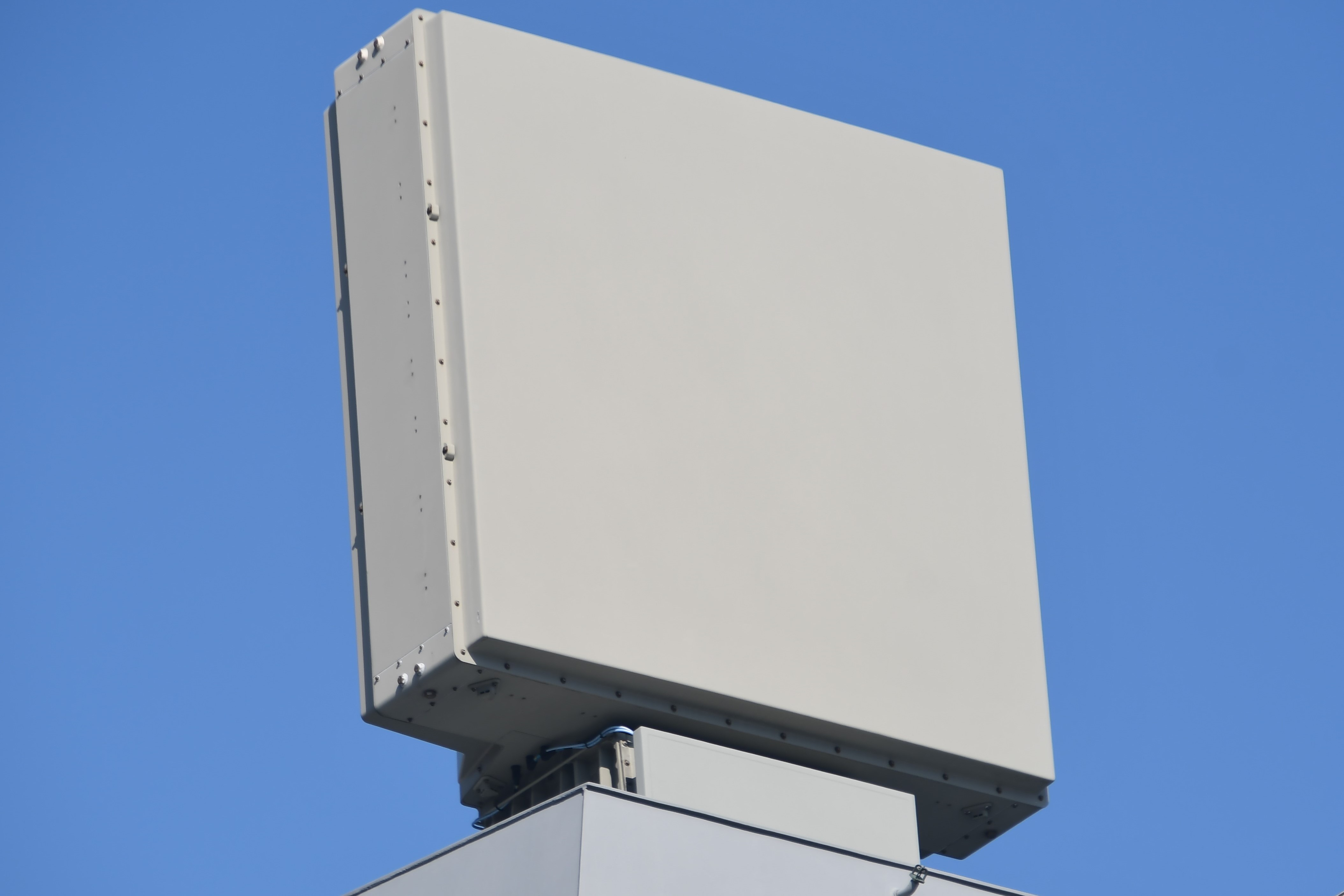
AESA antenna of the Sea Giraffe 4A on board HTMS Bhumibol Adulyadej

In May 2014, Saab Electronic Defence Systems (EDS) unveiled two new classes of active electronically scanned array (AESA) radar—three land-based systems (Giraffe 1X, Giraffe 4A and Giraffe 8A) and two naval variants (Sea Giraffe 1X and Sea Giraffe 4A).

==== Giraffe 8A ====
At the top end of the range is the Giraffe 8A, a long-range IEEE S-band (NATO E/F) 3D sensor that can be produced in fixed, transportable and fully mobile configurations.

Intended primarily for remote operation as part of an integrated air defence network, Giraffe 8A can also be operated locally. It has an instrumented range of 470 km (290 mi) and an altitude capability of more than 40,000 m (130,000 ft), bringing true long-range air defence capability to the Saab radar family for the first time.

Giraffe 8A produces 15 stacked beams to provide elevation coverage from ground level to more than 65°. It can operate in a continuous 360° scan mode, rotating mechanically at 24 rpm, or can be steered electronically across an operator-specified sector of 40° to 100°. More than 1,000 air defence tracks can be maintained, and the system also has anti-ballistic missile capability, in which case more than 100 tracks can be followed.

Saab has paid special attention to Giraffe 8A's electronic counter-countermeasures properties. The radar generates very low sidelobes and incorporates sophisticated frequency agility in pulse-to-pulse, burst-to-burst and scan-to-scan regimes. It also switches and staggers pulse repetition frequency and transmits random jitter to further confuse countermeasures. It automatically selects the least jammed frequencies and can transmit intermittently or randomly. The radar offers a passive detection and tracking capability against jammers.

==== Giraffe 4A and Sea Giraffe 4A ====
While the Giraffe 8A occupies the high end of the family, Saab has introduced new radars in the medium-range category in the form of Giraffe 4A and Sea Giraffe 4A for naval use. Employing similar S-band technology to the larger radar, Giraffe 4A offers true 3D multirole capability, combining the air defence and weapon locating tasks in a single unit. Able to be airlifted in a single C-130 load, Giraffe 4A can be deployed by two people in less than 10 minutes. It can operate as a standalone.

The Swedish armed forces designation for the Giraffe 4A radar is PM24.

A Giraffe 4A radar variant is also being considered for the use with the IRIS-T SL short and high to medium air defense surface-to-air missile system.

==== Giraffe 1X and Sea Giraffe 1X ====
To complete its new line-up, Saab has introduced two short-range radars, Giraffe 1X and Sea Giraffe 1X. Working in the IEEE X-band (NATO I-band), Giraffe 1X is intended primarily as a highly mobile radar that can work with very short-range air defence systems in the battlefield or at sea.

Weighing less than 300 kg (660 lb), Giraffe 1X can be mounted on a small vehicle or vessel or in fixed installations such as on a building or a mast. The radar has a sense-and-warn function and can be optionally configured for weapon location.

== Users ==
=== Operators ===
- Algeria: Sea Giraffe AMB G-band 3-D surveillance radar will equip MEKO A-200 frigates for the Algerian National Navy
- Australia: Sea Giraffe installed on Canberra-class landing helicopter dock ships and ordered as a ground-based system.
- Canada: Sea Giraffe is used on Halifax-class frigates.
- Estonia: Giraffe AMB - 5 mobile truck mounted units used by Estonian Air Defence Battalion.
- Finland: Jantronic J-1000 target acquisition systems with Ericsson Giraffe Mk IV radars on a XA-182 Pasi APC. Sea Giraffe installed on four Rauma-class missile boats. A combination of Sea Giraffe 4A and Sea Giraffe 1X fixed-face radars on the four Pohjanmaa-class ice-capable corvettes of the Squadron 2020 program
- France: Giraffe AMB in use by the French Air Force.
- Ireland: One Giraffe 40 acquired in 1986 and served until 2008, when replaced by seven Giraffe Mk IV mounted on Bandvagn 206 acquired from Norway. In June 2025, all seven were donated to Ukraine. 1 Giraffe 1x acquired as part of a C-UAS system in 2026
- Latvia
- Lithuania: Giraffe Mk IV radars used by the SHORAD units of the Lithuanian Armed Forces.
- Malaysia: Sea Giraffe installed on Lekiu-class frigate. Giraffe 40 used by Malaysian Army.
- Pakistan: Giraffe 40 in service with the Pakistan Army.
- Philippines: Sea Giraffe AMB radars installed on the Gregorio del Pilar-class offshore patrol vessels
- Serbia: 18 in active service with the Serbian Army; modernized (extended range and digital screen) and connected to PASARS-16. Produced in Serbia as M85 Žirafa.
- Singapore: Giraffe S and AMB in service with the Republic of Singapore Air Force's air-defence radar network; Sea Giraffe AMB aboard the Republic of Singapore Navy's Victory-class corvettes.
- Sweden: Used by both the Army and Navy historically in large numbers and with most versions starting with the PS-70 and today the Giraffe AMB both on land and in the Visby-class corvettes. The new 4A radar is planned to be acquired for the army's anti aircraft battalions when they switch from HAWK to Patriot missile systems. On 13 December Saab received an order for the delivery of a Sea Giraffe 1X for the Swedish Navy from the Swedish ministry of defense, the delivery of the Sea Giraffe 1X is expected between 2024 and 2026.,
- United Kingdom: The British Army and Royal Air Force jointly operate the G-AMB radar in 49 (Inkerman) Battery Royal Artillery. The RAF received an unknown number of Giraffe 1X radar systems in 2026 for use in counter-drone operations. The Royal Navy's 1st Autonomous Squadron deploys the system on K-3 Kraken uncrewed surface vessels for counter drone operations.
- United States: Sea Giraffe AMB installed on the Independence-class littoral combat ship as AN/SPS-77(V)1 and AN/SPS-77V(2)
- Ukraine: Five Giraffe Mk IV donated by Ireland, plus two more for spare parts.

=== Variant operators ===
==== Passive electronically scanned array (PESA) variants ====
- Giraffe 40 – 138
  Brazil 2, Finland 20, Indonesia 5, Ireland 1, Latvia 3, Lithuania 1, Malaysia 2, Norway 77, Pakistan 10, Singapore 4, Thailand 1, Tunisia 12
- Giraffe 50AT – 9
  Norway 9
- Giraffe 75 – 29
  Bahrain 6, Greece 6, Serbia 15, Venezuela 4
- Giraffe AMB – 30
  Australia 5, Canada 2, Estonia 4, France 4, Singapore 2, United Kingdom 10, United States 2, unknown 1
- Giraffe 100 – 4
  Finland 4
- Sea Giraffe 50HC – 26
  Bahrain 4, Finland 4, Kuwait 8, UAE 10
- Sea Giraffe 150 – 34
  Australia 8, Canada 12, Malaysia 2, New Zealand 2, Singapore 6, Thailand 4
- Sea Girafe AMB – 44
  Algeria 2, Philippines 2, Poland 6, UAE 6, United States 25

==== Active electronically scanned array (AESA) variants ====
- Giraffe 8A – 0
- Giraffe 4A – 11+
  Colombia 1, Finland 4, Germany 4, Sweden unknown, Thailand 1, United States unknown, unknown 1
- Giraffe 1X – 22+
  Belgium 3+, Finland 4, Germany 4, Lithuania unknown, Sweden 25+, Thailand 2, United Kingdom 11, United States 20+ , unknown 1

== See also ==
- ARTHUR
- List of radars
- List of military electronics of the United States
