= List of equipment of the Swedish Navy =

This is a list of equipment of the Swedish Navy currently in use and to be used. It includes equipment such as classes of ships, the weapons used on board as well as the munitions and electronics.

== Naval weapons ==
=== Submarine weapons ===
Model	Swedish designation	Image	Origin	Type	Calibre	Used with	Quantity	Notes
Torpedoes
Torped 45	Tp 45; Torped 45	–	Sweden	ASW - lightweight torpedo	400 mm (16 in)	Södermanland class (A17); Gotland class (A19)	–	Being replaced with the Torped 47. Planned to be retired by 2027.
SLWT	Tp 47; Torped 47	–	Sweden	ASW - lightweight torpedo	400 mm (16 in)	Södermanland class (A17); Gotland class (A19)	–	The weapon entered service in 2023. Contracts: 2016, development and first production batch, worth SEK 1.53 billion.; 2016, second batch for a value of SEK 1.53 billion.
SLWT	Tp 47; Torped 47	–	Sweden	ASW - lightweight torpedo	400 mm (16 in)	Blekinge class (A26)	–	The weapon entered service in 2023. Contracts: 2016, development and first production batch, worth SEK 1.53 billion.; 2016, second batch for a value of SEK 1.53 billion.
Torped 2000	Tp 62 steg 2 Torped 62	–	Sweden	ASuW - heavyweight torpedo	533 mm (21.0 in)	Södermanland class (A17); Gotland class (A19)	–	Torpedoes modernised between 2020 and 2024, to remain in service until mid 2040s. Torpedoes modernised between 2020 and 2024, to remain in service until mid 2040s.
Torped 2000	Tp 62 steg 2 Torped 62	–	Sweden	ASuW - heavyweight torpedo	533 mm (21.0 in)	Blekinge class (A26)	–	Torpedoes modernised between 2020 and 2024, to remain in service until mid 2040s. Torpedoes modernised between 2020 and 2024, to remain in service until mid 2040s.
Torped 63	Tp 63; Torped 63	–	Sweden	ASuW - heavyweight torpedo	533 mm (21.0 in)	Blekinge class (A26)	0 (to enter service in 2032)	Common technologies and parts with the SLWT, expected to become operational in 2032.
Mines
Mine 42	Sjöminor F42	–	Sweden	Stand-off self-deployed naval mine	–	Gotland class (A19)	–	To be replaced by 2030. 48 can be carried externally.

Current weapons that will also equip future ships

=== Surface vessels weapons ===
Model	Swedish designation	Image	Origin	Type	Calibre	Used with	Quantity	Notes
Torpedoes
Saab Dynamics Tub m/8502	Tub m/8502	–	Sweden	Torpedo launcher	400 mm (16 in)	Stockholm class	8 (4 × per Visby corvette)	Torpedo launcher, capable to launch Torped 45 and SLWT.
Torped 45	Tp 45; Torped 45	–	Sweden	ASW - lightweight torpedo	400 mm (16 in)	Stockholm class	8	Being replaced with the Torped 47. Planned to be retired by 2027.
Saab Dynamics Tub m/20	Tub m/20	–	Sweden	Torpedo launcher	400 mm (16 in)	Visby class Gävle class	28 (4 × per corvette)	Torpedo launcher, capable to launch Torped 45 and SLWT.
Saab Dynamics Tub m/20	Tub m/20	–	Sweden	Torpedo launcher	400 mm (16 in)	Luleå class	Unknown	Torpedo launcher, capable to launch Torped 45 and SLWT.
SLWT	Tp 47; Torped 47	–	Sweden	ASW - lightweight torpedo	400 mm (16 in)	Visby class Gävle class	Unknown	Entered service in 2023. Successor of the Torped 45, roles: ASW; ASuW; anti-torpedo; Contract of SEK 1.53 billion in 2016 for development and initial batch. Contract of SEK 1.53 billion in 2016 for second batch.
SLWT	Tp 47; Torped 47	–	Sweden	ASW - lightweight torpedo	400 mm (16 in)	Luleå class CB90 HSM class	Unknown	Entered service in 2023. Successor of the Torped 45, roles: ASW; ASuW; anti-torpedo; Contract of SEK 1.53 billion in 2016 for development and initial batch. Contract of SEK 1.53 billion in 2016 for second batch.
Cruise missiles
RBS15 launchers	–	–	Sweden	Missile launcher	500 mm (20 in)	Visby class	10 (2 × 4-cell launcher per ship)	Ordered in 2003 for the Visby class, installed behind a hatch.
RBS 15 Mk2	RBS 15M; Robotsystem 15M		Sweden	Anti-ship cruise missile	500 mm (20 in)	Visby class Gävle class Stockholm class	Unknown	To be replaced by RBS 15 Mk4 Gungir on the Visby class.
RBS 15 launchers	–		Sweden	Missile launcher	500 mm (20 in)	Gävle class Stockholm class	16 (4 × 2-cell launcher per ship)	Launching RBS15 Mk2 missiles, 8 missiles launch capacity per ship, 4 on each side.
RBS 15 Mk4 Gungir	RB 15M Gungir; Robot 15M	–	Sweden	Anti-ship / land-attack cruise missile	500 mm (20 in)	Visby class Luleå class	0 (to enter service in the next years)	
Anti-air missiles
3-cells ExLS	–	(illustration)	United States (Lockheed Martin); United Kingdom (MBDA UK)	VLS (modular)	–	Visby class	15 (3 × 3-cell launcher per ship)	4 missiles per cell, a total of 36 CAMM missile per Visby.
MBDA CAMM	–	–	Italy; United Kingdom	Short range SAM	166 mm (6.5 in)	Visby class	Unknown	Expected to enter service in 2026 with the Visby class. First order in November 2023. Complementary order in November 2025.
Naval guns
Bofors 57 Mk3	57mm allmålskanon Mk3		Sweden	Naval gun	57 mm L(70	Visby class	5 (1 × per ship)	Compatible with programmable ammunitions.
Bofors 57 Mk3b	57mm allmålskanon Mk3B		Sweden	Naval gun	57 mm L(70	Gävle class Stockholm class	4 (1 × per ship)	Compatible with programmable ammunitions.
BAE Bofors 57mm 3P	–		Sweden	Airburst round	57×438 mmR	Visby class Gävle class	Unknown	Compatible with programmable ammunitions. Known orders: $18 million order in December 2022; SEK 200 million order in December 2025
Bofors 40 Mk2	40 mm allmålspjäs		Sweden	Naval gun	40 mm L(70	Koster class HSwMS Carlskrona	7 (1 × per Koster, 2 × for the Carlskrona)	
Bofors 40 Mk4	40 mm allmålspjäs		Sweden	Naval gun	40 mm L(70	–	2	
Naval artillery
Patria NEMO container	–	–	Finland	Mortar container with turret	120 mm	Lätt trossbåt class	2	
Patria NEMO Navy	–	–	Finland	Mortar turret	120 mm	Granatkastarbåt class	0 (8 × to enter service in the next years)	Mortar vessels for the amphibious forces on order.
Decoy
MASS HIDD	–		Germany	Anti-missile decoy	–	Visby class Gävle class	Unknown	
Naval mines
Mine F80	Sjöminor F80		Sweden	Naval mine	–	Visby class Koster class CB90 class Lätt trossbåt class	Unknown	Used for sea and coastal mining by vessels fitted with adequate mine rails.
Mine F8	Sjöminor F8	–	Sweden	Naval mine	–	Visby class Koster class CB90 class Lätt trossbåt class	Unknown	
Mine F23 / F24	Sjöminor F23 / F24	–	Sweden	Naval mine	–	Visby class Koster class CB90 class Lätt trossbåt class	Unknown	
Mine K14	–	–	Sweden	Naval mine	–	–	Unknown	
Depth charges
Depth Charge M/33	Sjunkbomb Modell 33		Sweden	Depth charge	–	Visby class Gävle class Koster class	Unknown	
RCWS
Seasnake 30 (Oerlikon KCE)	–		Switzerland; Germany	RCWS	30×173mm	CB90 CX SHORAD class	8	Ordered in February 2026. To be equipped with Hensoldt Spexer radar. (Swiss system from Rheinmetall Air Defence AG).
Saab Trackfire	VS02; Vapenstation 02		Sweden	RCWS	7.62×51mm NATO; 12.7×99mm NATO	CB90 HSM class	Unknown	Equipped with a M2 Browning, and a FN MAG.
Saab Trackfire	VS02; Vapenstation 02		Sweden	RCWS	30×113mm 7.62×51mm NATO	CB90 HSM class	0 (to enter service in the next years)	To be equipped with a FN MAG and a M230LF Bushmaster.
Small arms
M230LF Bushmaster	–		United States	Aurocannon	30×113mm	CB90 HSM class	–	To be used on the Saab Trackfire.
Dillon Aero M134D	Ksp 18B; Snabbskjutande kulspruta	–	United States	Rotary cannon	7.62×51mm NATO	CB90 HSM class	Unknown	Ordered in 2024 for the Amphibious Corps
FN MAG	Ksp 58; Kulspruta 58		Belgium	GPMG	7.62×51mm NATO	Koster class CB90 class	Unknown	
FN M2HB CQB	Ksp 88; Kulspruta 88		Belgium; United States	HMG	12.7×99mm NATO	Visby class Koster class Lätt trossbåt class CB90 class CB90 HSM class	Unknown	
MK19 M3	Grsp 92; Granatspruta 92	–	United States	AGL	40×53mm HV	CB90 class	Unknown	

Current weapons that will also equip future ships

== Naval drones ==
Model	Swedish designation	Image	Origin	Type	Used with	Quantity	Notes
Torpedoes
Teledyne Gavia AUV	–	–	Sweden	AUV	Koster class Spårö class HSwMS Pelikanen	–	Ordered in 2024. Used for mine countermeasure missions. Equipped with a Flir Blackfly-S and a EdgeTech 2205 side scan sonar.
Saab AUV62-MR	–	–	Sweden	AUV	Koster class Spårö class HSwMS Pelikanen	–	Ordered in 2025. Used for mine countermeasure missions.
Saab LUUV	–	–	Sweden	LUUV	Gotland class (A19); Blekinge class (A26)	–	Development contract signed in August 2025 between Saab and the FMV worth SEK 60 million.

== Coastal defence ==
=== Coastal surveillance ===
Model	Swedish designation	Image	Origin	Type	Role	Range	Quantity	Notes
SCANTER 5202	–	–	Denmark	X-band primary surveillance radar	Coastal surveillance radar	–	51	Reactivated in 2025, and to be replaced by new launchers and new missiles, the RBS 15 Mk3.

=== Coastal weapons ===
Model	Swedish designation	Image	Origin	Type	Range	Quantity	Notes
RBS 15 Mk2	RBS15 KA; Robotsystem 15 Kustartilleri		Sweden	Coastal defence - anti-ship cruise missile	> 70 km (43 mi)	Unknown	Reactivated in 2025, and to be replaced by new launchers and new missiles, the RBS 15 Mk3.
RBS15 Mk3	RBS 15 SF-3; Robotsystem 15 SF-3		Sweden; Germany	Coastal defence - anti-ship cruise missile	> 200 km (120 mi)	Unknown	Ordered to replace the older version.
RBS 15 Mk4 Gungir	–	–	Sweden	Coastal defence - anti-ship cruise missile	> 300 km (190 mi)	Unknown	New coastal defence system, the Saab CDMS. Capable to attack land target, to enter service with coastal artillery when this variant is ready.
Robot 17	–		Sweden; United States	Coastal defence - anti-vessel missile	8 km (5.0 mi)	Unknown	Swedish modified variant of the AGM-114C Hellfire, used for surface-to-surface coastal defence. Missile used by the Amphibious Corps, the targets being small vessels.

== See also ==
List of equipment of the Swedish Armed Forces

- Swedish Navy
  - List of active ships of the Swedish Navy
- Swedish Coast Guard:
  - Swedish Coast Guard ships
  - Swedish Coast Guard aviation
- Swedish Army:
  - List of equipment of the Swedish Army
- Swedish Air Force
  - Current fleet of the Swedish Air Force
  - List of equipment of the Swedish Air Force
  - Weapons of the Swedish Air Force
  - List of military aircraft of Sweden
- Swedish Home Guard
  - List of equipment of the Swedish Home Guard
