= List of future ships of the Swedish Navy =

This is a list of future ships of the Swedish Navy.

== Ships ordered ==
=== Submarine service ===
Class	Quantity	Origin	Image	Type	Builder	Ship	No.	Comm.	Dp.	Notes
Submarines ordered (2)
Blekinge class (Projekt A26)	2	Sweden	–	Diesel-electric / AIP attack submarines	Saab Kockums	HSwMS Blekinge	–	2031 to 2035 (Delayed from 2028 / 2029)	1,925 tonnes (surfaced); 2,100 tonnes (submerged)	
Blekinge class (Projekt A26)	2	Sweden	–	Diesel-electric / AIP attack submarines	Saab Kockums	HSwMS Skåne	–	2031 to 2035 (Delayed from 2028 / 2029)	1,925 tonnes (surfaced); 2,100 tonnes (submerged)	
Autonomous underwater vehicles
Saab LUUV	1	Sweden	–	LUUV (Large Uncrewed Undersea Vehicle)	Saab Kockums	–	–	2031 to 2035 (Delayed from 2028 / 2029)	–	

=== Combat surface fleet ===
Class	Quantity	Origin	Image	Type	Builder	Ship	No.	Comm.	Dp.	Notes
Frigates (4)
Luleå class (Naval Group designation: FDI class)	4	France; Sweden	(illustration)	Frigate (AAW, ASuW and ASW)	Naval Group (Naval Group Lorient shipyard)	HSwMS Luleå	–	2030 to 2035	4,460 tonnes	
Luleå class (Naval Group designation: FDI class)	4	France; Sweden	(illustration)	Frigate (AAW, ASuW and ASW)	Naval Group (Naval Group Lorient shipyard)	HSwMS Norrköping	–	2030 to 2035	4,460 tonnes	
Luleå class (Naval Group designation: FDI class)	4	France; Sweden	(illustration)	Frigate (AAW, ASuW and ASW)	Naval Group (Naval Group Lorient shipyard)	HSwMS Trelleborg	–	2030 to 2035	4,460 tonnes	
Luleå class (Naval Group designation: FDI class)	4	France; Sweden	(illustration)	Frigate (AAW, ASuW and ASW)	Naval Group (Naval Group Lorient shipyard)	HSwMS Halmstad	–	2030 to 2035	4,460 tonnes	
Fast attack crafts (8)
Granatkastarbåt	8	Sweden	–	Mortar vessels	Swede Ship Marine (Djupvik shipyard)	–	–	2027 to 2028	–	Vessels equipped with Patria NEMO Navy mortar systems.
Granatkastarbåt	8	Sweden	–	Mortar vessels	Swede Ship Marine (Djupvik shipyard)	–	–	2027 to 2028	–	Vessels equipped with Patria NEMO Navy mortar systems.
Granatkastarbåt	8	Sweden	–	Mortar vessels	Swede Ship Marine (Djupvik shipyard)	–	–	2027 to 2028	–	Vessels equipped with Patria NEMO Navy mortar systems.
Granatkastarbåt	8	Sweden	–	Mortar vessels	Swede Ship Marine (Djupvik shipyard)	–	–	2027 to 2028	–	Vessels equipped with Patria NEMO Navy mortar systems.
Granatkastarbåt	8	Sweden	–	Mortar vessels	Swede Ship Marine (Djupvik shipyard)	–	–	2027 to 2028	–	Vessels equipped with Patria NEMO Navy mortar systems.
Granatkastarbåt	8	Sweden	–	Mortar vessels	Swede Ship Marine (Djupvik shipyard)	–	–	2027 to 2028	–	Vessels equipped with Patria NEMO Navy mortar systems.
Granatkastarbåt	8	Sweden	–	Mortar vessels	Swede Ship Marine (Djupvik shipyard)	–	–	2027 to 2028	–	Vessels equipped with Patria NEMO Navy mortar systems.
Granatkastarbåt	8	Sweden	–	Mortar vessels	Swede Ship Marine (Djupvik shipyard)	–	–	2027 to 2028	–	Vessels equipped with Patria NEMO Navy mortar systems.
Light boats (120)
Watercat M9	20	Finland		Landing craft	Marine Alutech Oy	–	–	2028	–	
MSMB typ 200 (Alukin designation: CW950)	Up to 100 (Note: Framework agreement for up to 100 speedboats MSMB typ 200, with delivery under agreement by 2033. 100 boats were originally acquired.)	Sweden	–	Speedboats	Svekon (Svensk Konstruktionstjänst AB)	–	–	From 2026	–	Mindre Snabbgående MotorBåt.
Autonomous underwater vehicles
AUV62-MR	Undisclosed	Sweden	–	Mine hunting robot	Saab	–	–	From 2026	–	
Gavia AUV	Undisclosed	United States	–	Portable, modular, autonomous underwater vehicles	Teledyne	–	–	2025 to 2028	–	Initially designed for seabed mapping and high-resolution sonar imaging.

=== Auxiliary fleet ===
Class	Quantity	Origin	Image	Type	Builder	Ship	No.	Comm.	Dp.	Notes
Support ships (2)
Arbetsfartyg	2	Spain	–	Torpedo / robot salvage, and diving vessel	Astilleros Armon Vigo SA	HSwMS Tumlaren	–	2027	1,000 tonnes	Ships ordered in February 2024. Successor of the HSwMS Pelikanen and the HSwMS Furusund.
Arbetsfartyg	2	Spain	–	Torpedo / robot salvage, and diving vessel	Astilleros Armon Vigo SA	HSwMS Sälen	–	2028	1,000 tonnes	Ships ordered in February 2024. Successor of the HSwMS Pelikanen and the HSwMS Furusund.
Logistics boat (4)
TBD	4	Sweden	–	Pusher / coastal tugboat	Freire Shipyard	–	–	2029	840 tonnes	
TBD	4	Sweden	–	Pusher / coastal tugboat	Freire Shipyard	–	–	2029	840 tonnes	
TBD	4	Sweden	–	Pusher / coastal tugboat	Freire Shipyard	–	–	2030	840 tonnes	
TBD	4	Sweden	–	Pusher / coastal tugboat	Freire Shipyard	–	–	2030	840 tonnes	

== Ships planned to be ordered ==
=== Submarine service ===
Class	Quantity	Origin	Image	Type	Builder	Ship	No.	Comm.	Dp.	Notes
Submarines planned (4)
Projekt A30	4	Sweden	–	Attack submarines	Saab Kockums	–	–	Planned for 2038	–	
Projekt A30	4	Sweden	–	Attack submarines	Saab Kockums	–	–	–	–	
Projekt A30	4	Sweden	–	Attack submarines	Saab Kockums	–	–	–	–	
Projekt A30	4	Sweden	–	Attack submarines	Saab Kockums	–	–	–	–	
Underwater drones
SMaRC AUV; Swedish Maritime Robotics Centre	Unknown	Sweden	–	Autonomous underwater vehicles	FMV, KTH and Saab	–	–	–	–	

== See also ==
List of active Swedish Navy ships
