= Swedish Armed Forces =

National military force of Sweden

- Försvarsmakten
- Armed Forces' coat of arms

- War flag and Naval Ensign of Sweden
- Founded: 1521; 505 years ago
- Current form: 1975; 51 years ago
- Service branches: Swedish Army; Swedish Navy; Swedish Amphibious Corps; Swedish Fleet; Swedish Air Force; Home Guard
- Headquarters: Stockholm
- Website: forsvarsmakten.se

Leadership
- Commander-in-Chief: Government (Kristersson cabinet)
- Minister of Defence: Pål Jonson
- Chief of Defence: Gen Michael Claesson

Personnel
- Military age: 18–47
- Conscription: Yes
- Active personnel: 29,600 88,000 (total during wartime), 130,000 (total wartime goal 2035)
- Reserve personnel: 34,500 (Home guard, part time soldiers & reserve officers)

Expenditure
- Budget: 175 billion SEK, about $17.5 billion (2026)
- Percent of GDP: 2.8 % (2026)(2025)

Industry
- Domestic suppliers: BAE Systems AB; Saab AB; Saab Bofors Dynamics; Saab Kockums

Related articles
- History: Military history of Sweden
- Ranks: Military ranks of the Swedish Armed Forces

The Swedish Armed Forces (Swedish: Försvarsmakten, literally The Defence Force) are the armed forces of the Kingdom of Sweden. It consists of four separate military branches, the Swedish Army, the Swedish Navy, the Swedish Air Force and the Home Guard.

The Swedish Armed Forces have a long history, and reached their height in the seventeenth century, during the time of the Swedish Empire, when they participated in a variety of wars; these include the Scanian War, Northern War of 1655–1660, and Great Northern War, among others. Since the nineteenth century, they have also played an important role in the maintenance of Swedish neutrality, especially during the Cold War.

The Swedish Armed Forces consist of 29,600 active personnel, including 10,400 officers, 7,200 enlisted soldiers, and 12,000 civilian employees. Additionally, there are 7,100 reserve officers and 4,800 part-time enlisted soldiers, along with 22,600 soldiers in the Home Guard. As of 2023, 6,300 conscripts undergo military training annually, set to increase to 10,000 by 2030. In wartime, the total personnel is estimated to be 88,000, including all regularly employed personnel, reservists, and conscripts.

Units of the Swedish Armed Forces are currently on or have taken part in several international operations either actively or as military observers, including Afghanistan as part of the Resolute Support Mission and in Kosovo (as part of Kosovo Force). Moreover, the Swedish Armed Forces contribute as the leading state for a European Union Battlegroup approximately once every three years through the Nordic Battlegroup. Prior to 2024 Sweden had close relations with NATO and its members, and participates in training exercises like the Admiral Pitka Recon Challenge, and Exercise Trident Juncture 2018. In 2024, the country formally became a member of NATO. Sweden also has a strong cooperation with its closest allies of the Nordic countries, being part of the Nordic Defence Cooperation, Joint Expeditionary Force, and joint exercises such as Exercise Northern Wind.

Sweden has not participated in an officially declared war since the 1814 Swedish–Norwegian War, although its forces, under the UN flag, have been involved in such conflicts as the Congo Crisis and the military intervention in Libya.

== Equipment ==
The Swedish army has 121 tanks (Leopard 2/Strv 122), roughly 1,540 APCs (Patria XA-360/203/180, RG-32 Scout, Bv410, Bv308/309), 450 IFVs (CV9040), 11,300 utility vehicles (ex. Bv206/208, MB G-Class 6x6 and 4x4, MB sprinter), 84 towed and 40 self-propelled mortar (12 cm grk m/41, grkpbv90) and 26 self-propelled artillery guns (Archer). It also consists of several different specialised vehicles.

The Swedish Navy has a total of 387 ships, including 4 submarines (3 Gotland, 1 Södermanland), 7 corvettes (5 Visby, 2 Gävle), 9 minesweepers (5 Koster, 4 Styrsö), 13 larger patrol boats (2 Stockholm and 11 Tapper) and 9 specialised ships with different support duties. The rest is made up of different smaller vessels such as the CB90.

Currently the Swedish Airforce has a total of 210 aircraft, 94 of those being JAS39C/D Gripen (60 JAS39E on order), 6 C130H Hercules (1 with aerial refueling capabilities), 4 SAAB 340 (2 AEW&C and 2 VIP transport), 4 Gulfstream IV (2 SIGINT and 2 VIP transport) as well as 15 UH-60 Blackhawk, 18 NH90 and 20 AgustaWestland helicopters. The rest is made up of different transport and trainer aircraft.

== History ==
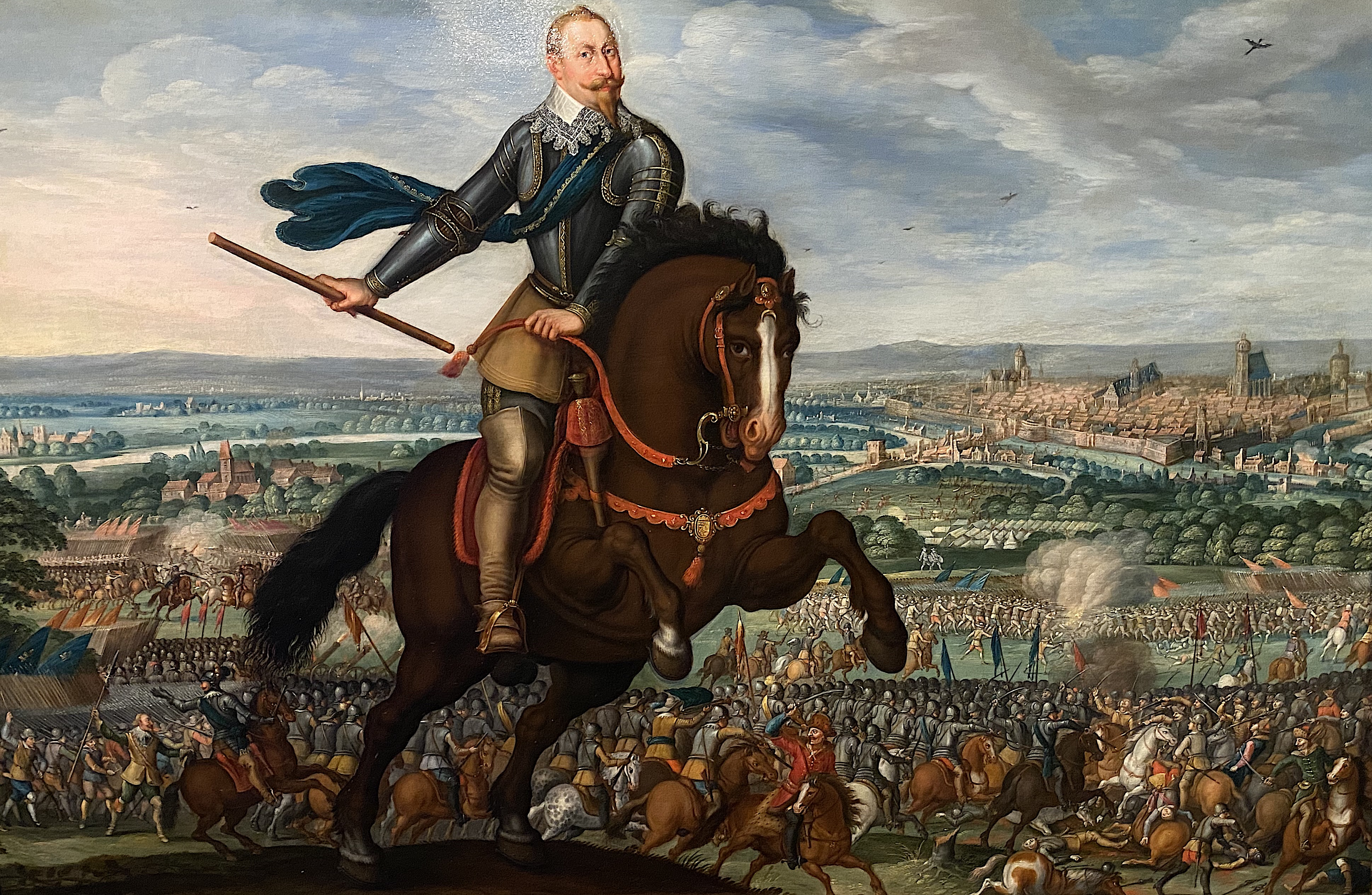
The 1631 Battle of Breitenfeld was a decisive victory for King Gustavus Adolphus, marking the first major Swedish triumph in the Thirty Years' War.

The history of the Swedish Armed Forces dates back to the early sixteenth century, when they were founded by the newly crowned monarch Gustav I Vasa. Since then, they have played an important role in the history of Sweden; they have been engaged in numerous conflicts since their founding.

It was in the seventeenth century that the Swedish Armed Forces reached their height, during the time of the Swedish Empire. During this time, they were among the leaders in military innovation, and engaged in many wars; among the Swedish wars of the seventeenth century were the Thirty Years' War, Second Northern War, Scanian War and Great Northern War. The military of the Swedish Empire was one of the most important institutions in the empire.

After a period of enhanced readiness during World War I, the Swedish Armed Forces were subject to severe downsizing during the interwar years. When World War II started, a large rearmament program was launched to once again guard Swedish neutrality, relying on mass male conscription as a source for personnel.

After World War II, Sweden considered building nuclear weapons to deter a Soviet invasion. From 1945 to 1972 the Swedish government ran a clandestine nuclear weapons program under the guise of civilian defence research at the Swedish National Defence Research Institute. By the late 1950s, the work had reached the point where underground testing was feasible. However, at that time the Riksdag prohibited research and development of nuclear weapons, pledging that research should be done only for the purpose of defence against nuclear attack. The option to continue development was abandoned in 1966, and Sweden subsequently signed the Non-Proliferation Treaty in 1968; the program was finally concluded in 1972.

During the Cold War, the wartime mass conscription system was kept in place to act as a deterrent to the Soviet Union, seen as the greatest military threat to Sweden. The end of the Cold War and the collapse of the Soviet Union meant that the perceived threat lessened and the armed forces were downsized, with conscription taking in fewer and fewer recruits until it was deactivated in 2010. This small size is often considered one of the major strategic weaknesses of the Swedish Armed Forces.

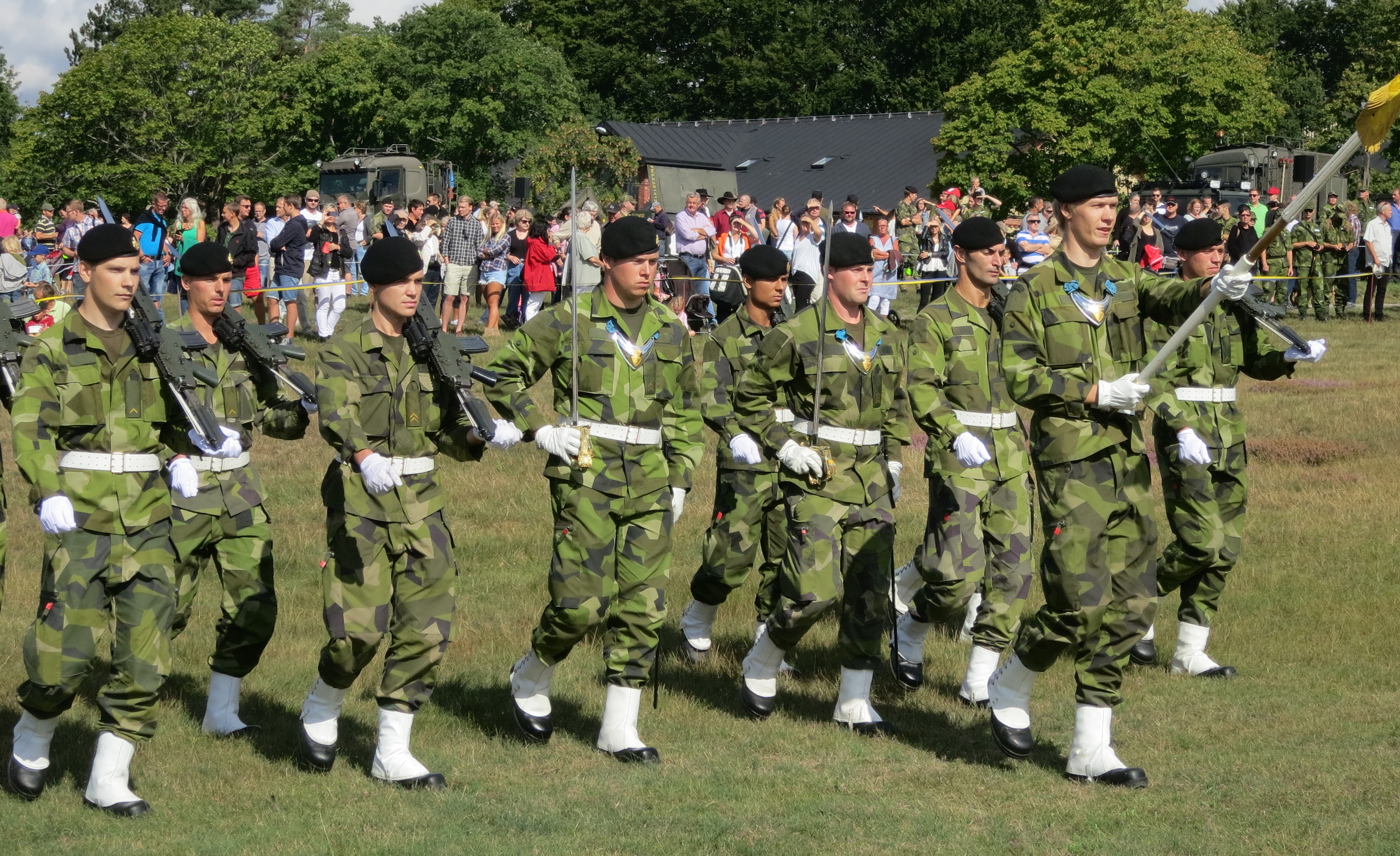
Soldiers of the South Skåne Regiment in 2013

The Russo-Georgian War of 2008 and the events in Ukraine in 2014 gradually shifted Swedish debate back in favour of increased defence spending, as concerns grew over Russia's military buildup and intentions. Conscription was reintroduced in 2017 to supplement the insufficient number of volunteers signing up for service. Unlike in the past, the current conscription system applies to both men and women.

Following the United Kingdom leaving the European Union in 2020, the EU's mutual defence clause (Lisbon Treaty Article 42.7) ceased to apply to the UK. In 2022, Sweden and the UK signed a mutual security deal, re-pledging support if either state is attacked.

On 29 June 2022, Finland and Sweden were formally invited to become members of NATO, and joined respectively in 2023 and 2024.

== Doctrine ==
The Swedish Armed Forces have four main tasks:

1. To assert the territorial integrity of Sweden.
2. To defend the country if attacked by a foreign nation.
3. To support the civil community in case of disasters (e.g. flooding).
4. To deploy forces to international peace support operations.

Sweden aims to have the option of remaining neutral in case of proximate war. However, Sweden cooperates militarily with a number of foreign countries. As a member state of the European Union, Sweden is acting as the leading state for EU Battlegroups and also has a close cooperation, including joint exercises, with NATO through its membership in Partnership for Peace and Euro-Atlantic Partnership Council. In 2008 a partnership was initiated between the Nordic countries to, among other things, increase the capability of joint action, and this led to the creation of the Nordic Defence Cooperation (NORDEFCO). As a response to the expanded military cooperation the defence proposition of 2009 stated that Sweden will not remain passive if a Nordic country or a member state of the European Union were attacked.

Recent political decisions have strongly emphasised the capability to participate in international operations, to the point where this has become the main short-term goal of training and equipment acquisition. However, after the 2008 South Ossetia war territorial defence was once again emphasised. Until then most units could not be mobilised within one year. In 2009 the Minister for Defence stated that in the future all of the armed forces must be capable of fully mobilising within one week.

In 2013, after Russian air exercises in close proximity to the Swedish border were widely reported, only six percent of Swedes expressed confidence in the ability of the nation to defend itself.

== Organisation ==
Swedish Armed Forces main bases 2024
Naval Base Air Base Infantry Base Mechanised Infantry Base
Cavalry Base Artillery Base Air Defence Base Engineer Base

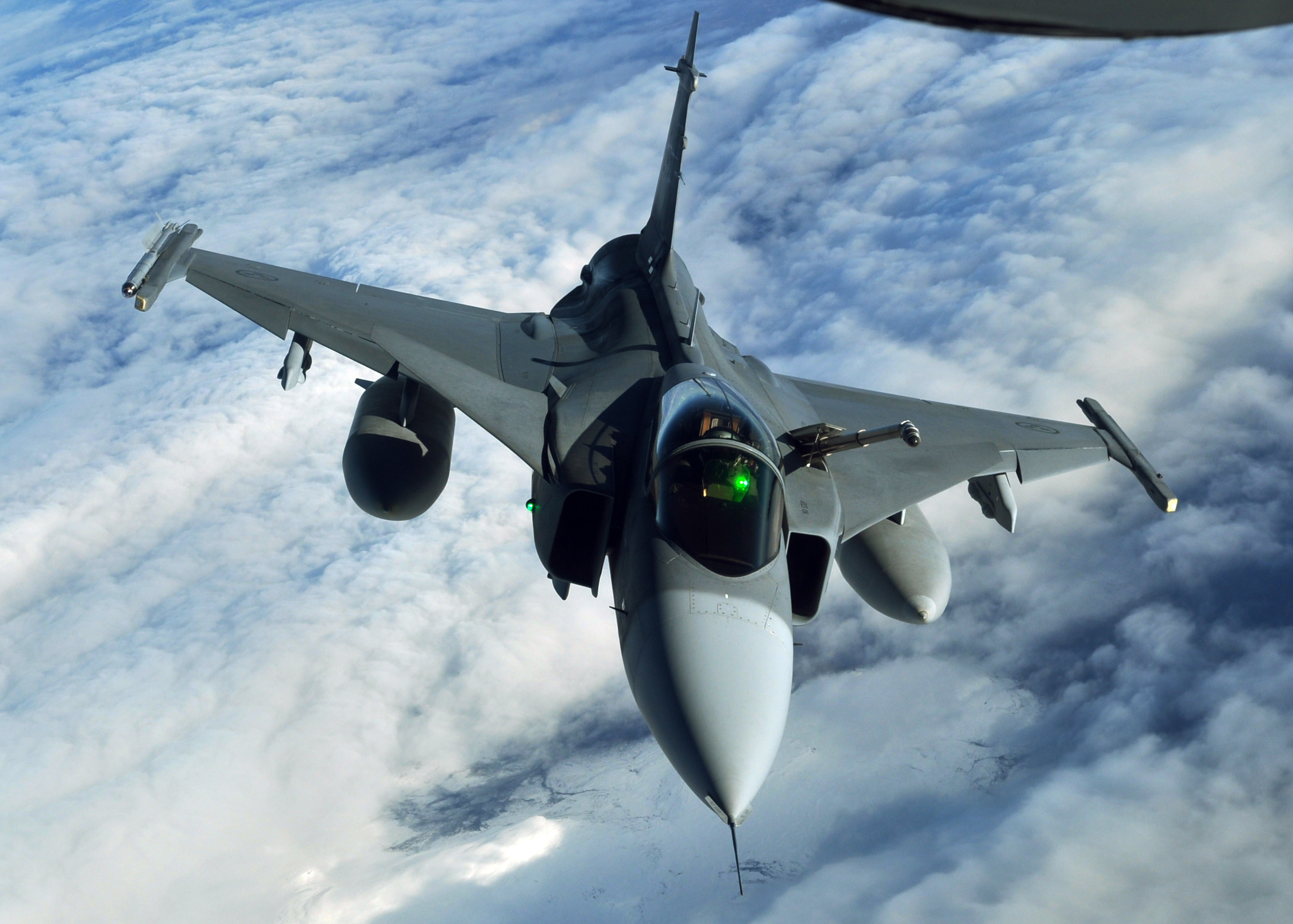
The Swedish multirole fighter, the Saab JAS 39 Gripen.

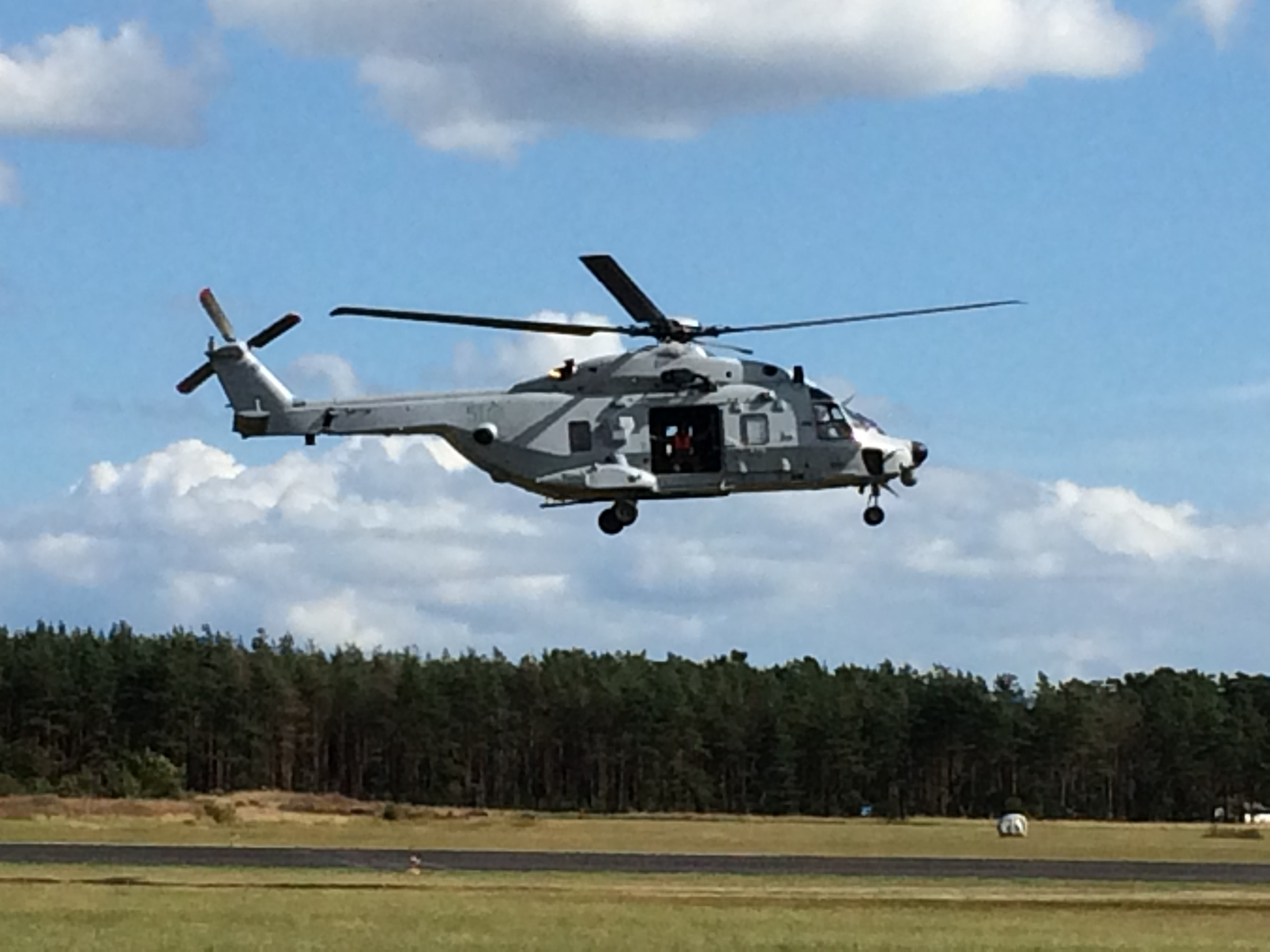
NH90 of the Swedish Armed Forces

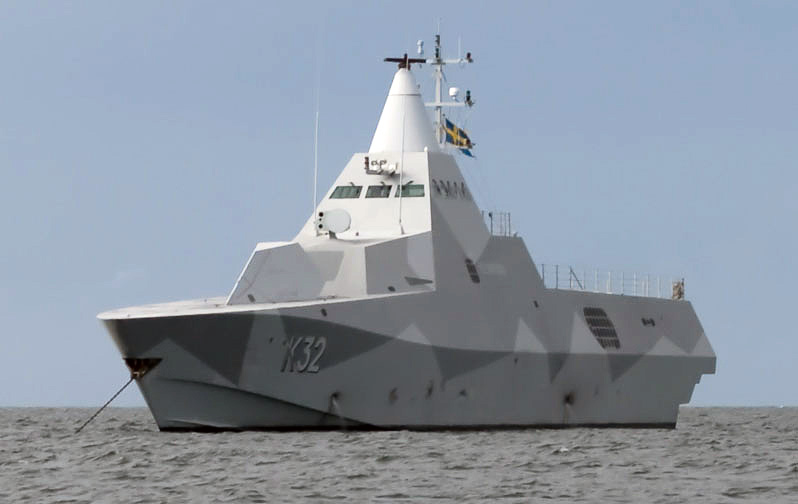
The Swedish Visby class corvette.

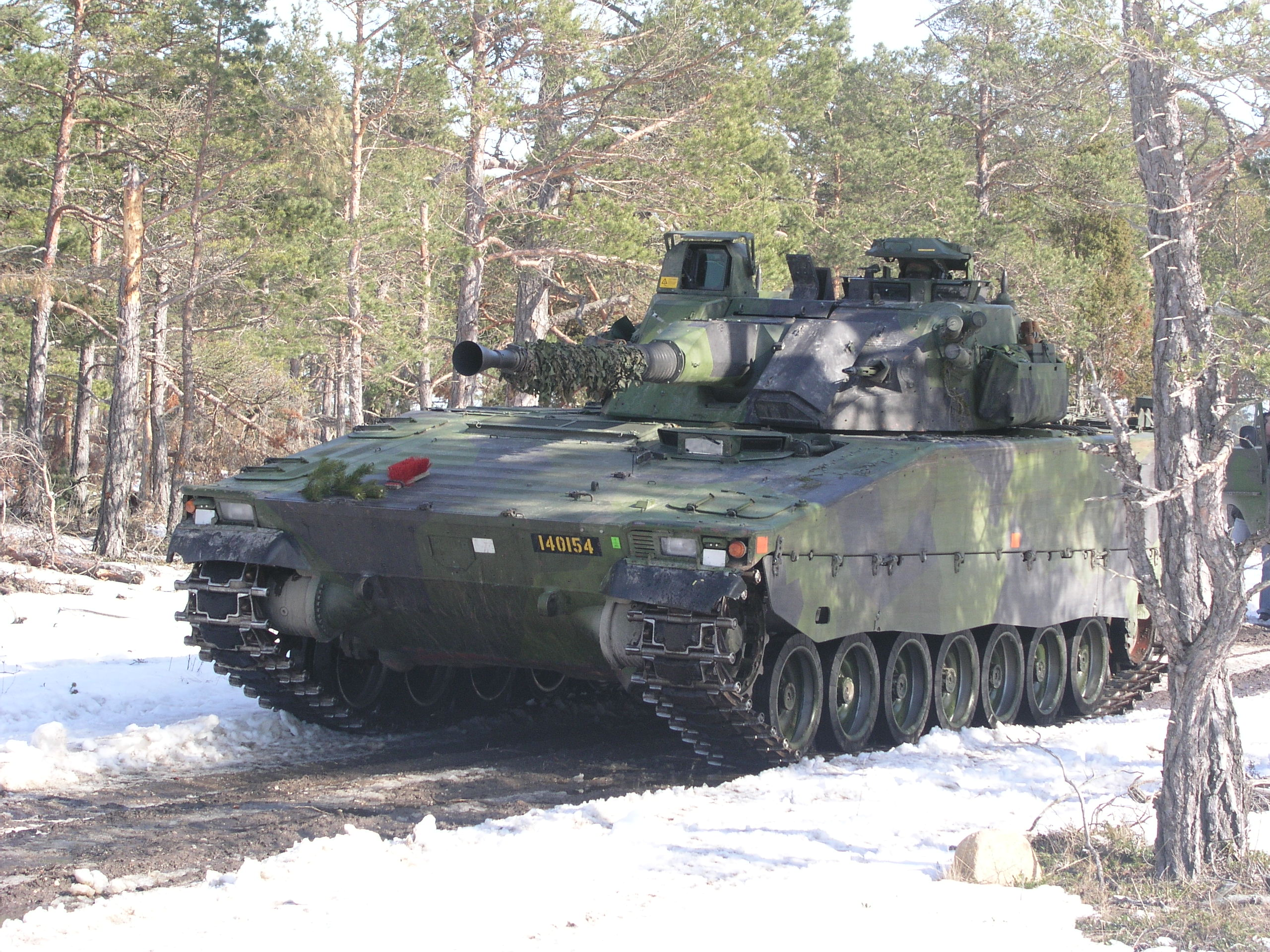
The Infantry fighting vehicle CV 90 produced and used by Sweden.

The Chief of Defence, formerly the Supreme Commander of the Swedish Armed Forces (Swedish: Överbefälhavaren, ÖB), is a four-star general or flag officer who is the agency head of the Swedish Armed Forces and the highest ranking professional officer on active duty. The Chief of Defence reports, normally through the Minister of Defence, to the Government of Sweden, which in turn answers to the Riksdag. The current chief of defence is General Michael Claesson.

Before the enactment of the 1974 Instrument of Government, the King of Sweden was the de jure commander in chief (Swedish: högste befälhavare). Since then, King Carl XVI Gustaf is still considered to hold the honorary ranks of general and admiral à la suite, but the role is entirely ceremonial.

The Swedish Armed Forces consists of three service branches; the Army, the Air Force and the Navy, with addition of the military reserve force Home Guard. Since 1994, the first three service branches are organised within a single unified government agency, headed by the Chief of Defence, while the Home Guard reports directly to the chief. However, the services maintain their separate identities through the use of different uniforms, ranks, and other service specific traditions.

=== Armed Forces Headquarters ===
The Swedish Armed Forces Headquarters is the highest level of command in the Swedish Armed Forces. It is led by the Chief of Defence (formerly the Supreme Commander of the Swedish Armed Forces) with a civilian director-general as his deputy, with functional directorates having different responsibilities (e.g. the Military Intelligence and Security Service). Overall, the Armed Forces Headquarters has about 2,100 employees, including civilian personnel.

=== Schools ===
Some of the schools listed below answer to other units, listed under the various branches of the Armed Forces:

- Artillery Combat School (ArtSS) located in Boden
- Armed Forces Technical School (FMTS) located in Halmstad
- Air Warfare Centre (LSS) located in Uppsala
- Armed Forces Interpreter/Interrogator School (TolkS) located in Uppsala
- Swedish Defence University (FHS) located in Stockholm
- Field Work School (FarbS) located in Eksjö
- Air Force Air Officer School (FBS) located in Uppsala
- Swedish Parachute Ranger School (FJS) located in Karlsborg
- Flight School (FlygS) located in Linköping/Malmen
- Helicopter Combat School (HkpSS) located in Linköping/Malmen
- National Home Guard Combat School (HvSS) located in Södertälje
- Command School (LedS) located in Enköping
- Anti-Aircraft Combat School (LvSS) located in Halmstad
- Military Academy Halmstad (MHS H) located in Halmstad
- Military Academy Karlberg (MHS K) located in Stockholm/Karlberg
- Land Warfare Centre (MSS) located in Skövde also a detachment in Kvarn
- Swedish Naval Warfare Centre (SSS) located in Karlskrona and Stockholm/Berga

=== Centres ===
- Swedish Armed Forces Centre for Defence Medicine (FömedC) located in Gothenburg, with a section in Linköping
- Swedish Armed Forces Logistics (FMLOG) located in Stockholm, Boden, Karlskrona and Arboga
- Armed Forces Intelligence and Security Centre (FMUndSäkC) located in Uppsala
- Armed Forces Musical Centre (FöMusC) located in Stockholm/Kungsängen
- Recruitment Centre (RekryC) located in Stockholm
- National CBRN Defence Centre (SkyddC) located in Umeå
- Swedish EOD and Demining Centre (SWEDEC) located in Eksjö
- Swedish Armed Forces International Center (Swedint) located in Stockholm/Kungsängen
- Swedish Defence Research Agency (FOI)

==== Nordic Battlegroup ====
The Nordic Battlegroup is a cooperative formation of the Swedish Armed Forces alongside mainly the other Nordic countries but also some of the Baltic countries as well as Ireland, tasked as one of the EU Battlegroups. The headquarter garrison for this group is currently situated in Enköping, Sweden.

=== International deployments ===
Sweden is part of the multinational Kosovo Force and has a naval force deployed to the gulf of Aden as a part of Operation Atalanta. Military observers from Sweden have been sent to a large number of countries, including Georgia, Lebanon, Israel and Sri Lanka and Sweden also participates with staff officers to missions in Sudan and Chad. Sweden has been one of the Peacekeeping nations of the Neutral Nations Supervisory Commission that is tasked with overseeing the truce in the Korean Demilitarized Zone since the Korean war ended in 1953. It was revealed in 2025 that Sweden was assisting the US in Somalia, primarily in regards to identification of killed and captured terrorists.

==== Past deployments ====
Swedish air and ground forces saw combat during the Congo Crisis, as part of the United Nations Operation in the Congo force. Nine army battalions were sent in all, and their mission lasted from 1960 to 1964.

A battalion and other units were deployed with the NATO-led peacekeeping SFOR in Bosnia and Herzegovina (1996–2000), following the Bosnian War. NORDBAT 2 has been studied as an example of mission command on a chaotic battlefield with conflicting national orders.

Sweden had military forces deployed in Afghanistan with the NATO-led International Security Assistance Force (2001–2014), and the subsequent Resolute Support Mission (2015–2021), which ended when all NATO troops were withdrawn after 20 years of action.

== Personnel ==
=== From national service to an all-volunteer force ===
In mid-1995, with the national service system based on universal military training, the Swedish Army consisted of 15 maneuver brigades and, in addition, 100 battalions of various sorts (artillery, engineers, rangers, air defence, amphibious, security, surveillance etc.) with a mobilisation-time of between one and two days. When national service was replaced by a selective service system, fewer and fewer young men were drafted due to the reduction in size of the armed forces. By 2010 the Swedish Army had two battalions that could be mobilised within 90 days. When the volunteer system had been fully implemented by 2019, the army consisted of 7 maneuver battalions and 14 battalions of various sorts with a readiness of one week. The Home Guard was reduced in size to 22,000 soldiers. In 2019 the Swedish Armed Forces, now with a restored national service system combined with volunteer forces, aimed to reach 3 brigades as maneuver units by 2025.

	National Service Force 1995	Selective Service Force 2010	All-Volunteer Force 2019	Selective Service Force/Volunteer Force 2025
Maneuver units	15 brigades	2 battalions	7 battalions	3 brigades
Auxiliary units	100 battalions	4 companies	14 battalions	?
Readiness	1 to 2 days	90 days	7 days	?

=== Re-implementing conscription ===
After having ended the universal male conscription system in 2010, as well as deactivating conscription in peacetime, the conscription system was re-activated in 2017. Since 2018 both women and men are conscripted on equal terms. The motivation behind reactivating conscription was the need for personnel, as volunteer numbers proved to be insufficient to maintain the armed forces.

The Swedish defence forces are currently educating 9 000 conscripts per year. However, after the Russian invasion of Ukraine, the defence forces stated that there is a need for significantly more than the current. By December 2022, it was announced to increase the yearly conscripted to 10,000 by the end of 2035. In addition, figures from 2022 show that 79% of Swedes support in some form, an increase in the number of people who are conscripted. 47% of the respondents said that the majority of 19/20 year-olds should perform conscription.

=== Personnel structure ===
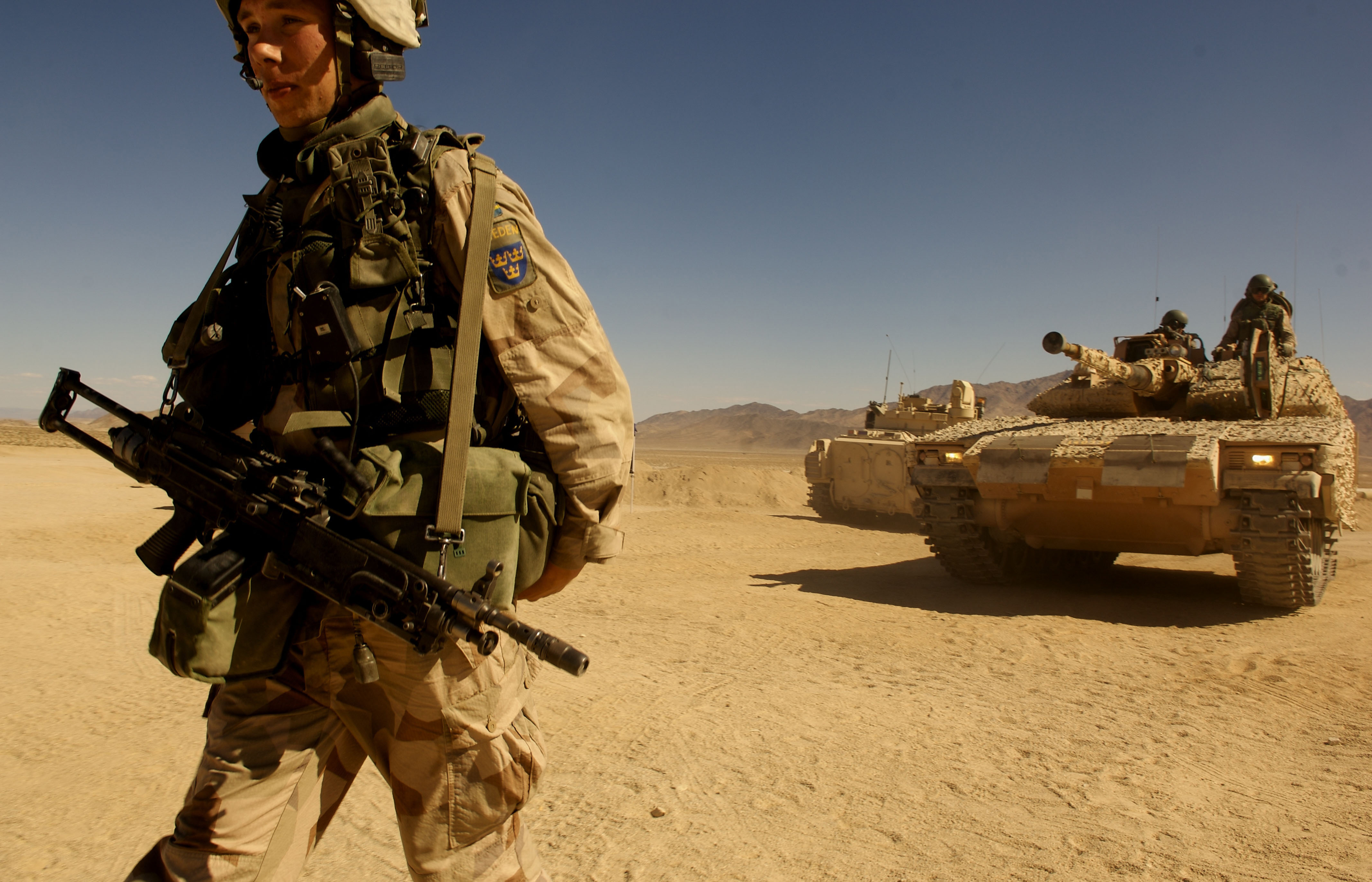
Swedish soldier during an exercise in California, 2007.

Military personnel of the Swedish Armed Forces consists of:

- Officer OFF/K – Regular continuously serving officers (OF1-OF9).
- Officer OFF/T – Reserve part-time officers (OF1-OF3).
- Specialistofficer SO/K – Regular continuously serving NCO (OR6-OR9).
- Specialistofficer SO/T – Reserve part-time serving NCO (OR6-OR7).
- GSS/K – Regular continuously serving enlisted (OR1-OR5).
- GSS/T – Reserve part-time serving enlisted (OR1-OR5).
- GSS/P – Personnel in wartime placement (OR1-OR5).

K = Continuously

T = Part-time

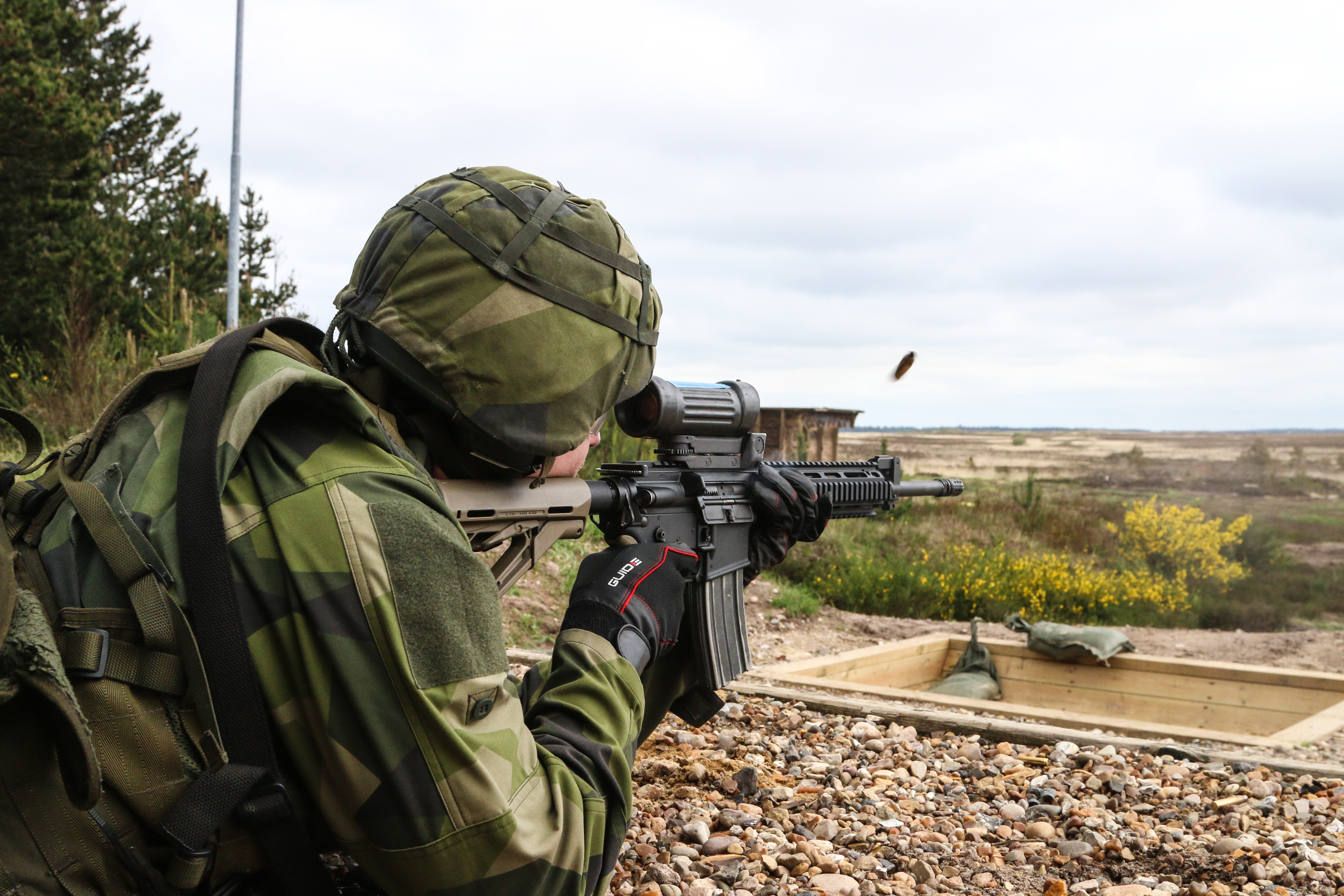
Swedish soldier firing a rifle in Denmark, 2016.

P = Conscript, for personnel drafted under the Swedish law of comprehensive defence duty

=== Planned size of the Swedish Armed Forces 2011–2020 ===
Category	Continuously serving	Part-time serving	Contracted
OFF	3,900 OFF/K	2,600 OFF/T	–
SO	4,900 SO/K	included in the above SO/T	–
GSS	6,600 GSS/K	9,500 GSS/T	–
Home Guard	–	–	22,000

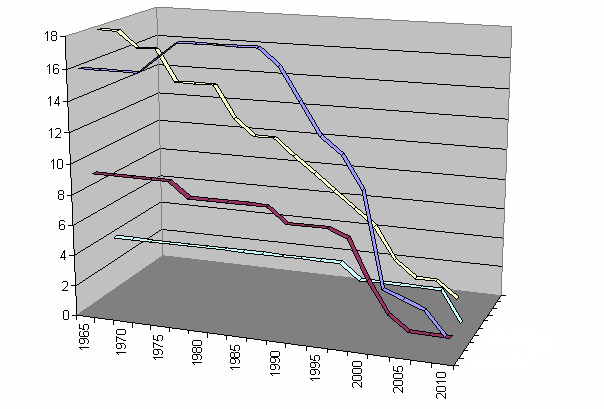
Chart showing the size of the Swedish Armed Forces 1965–2010. Yellow = number of air wings; Blue = number of infantry regiments; Red = number of artillery regiments; Green = number of coastal artillery and amphibious regiments.

Annual recruitment of GSS is assumed to be about 4,000 persons.

=== Criticism and research ===
In 2008, professor Mats Alvesson of the University of Lund and Karl Ydén of the University of Gothenburg claimed in an op-ed, based on Ydén's doctoral dissertation, that a large part of the officer corps of the Swedish Armed Forces was preoccupied with administrative tasks instead of training soldiers or partaking in international operations. They claimed that Swedish officers were mainly focused on climbing the ranks and thereby increasing their wages and that the main way of doing this is to take more training courses, which decreases the number of officers that are specialised in their field. Therefore, the authors claimed, the Swedish Armed Forces were poorly prepared for their mission. Major changes have been made to the officer system since then.

The transformation of the old invasion defence-oriented armed forces to the new smaller and more mobile force has also been criticised. According to the Supreme Commander of the Swedish Armed Forces the present defence budget will not be enough to implement the new defence structure by 2019. And that even when finished the armed forces will only be able to fight for a week at most.

During 2013 several Russian Air Force exercises over the Baltic Sea aimed at Swedish military targets have made the future of the Swedish Armed Forces a hot topic and several political parties now want to increase defence funding. In August 2019, the government announced a bank tax to fund the military spending.

=== Ranks ===
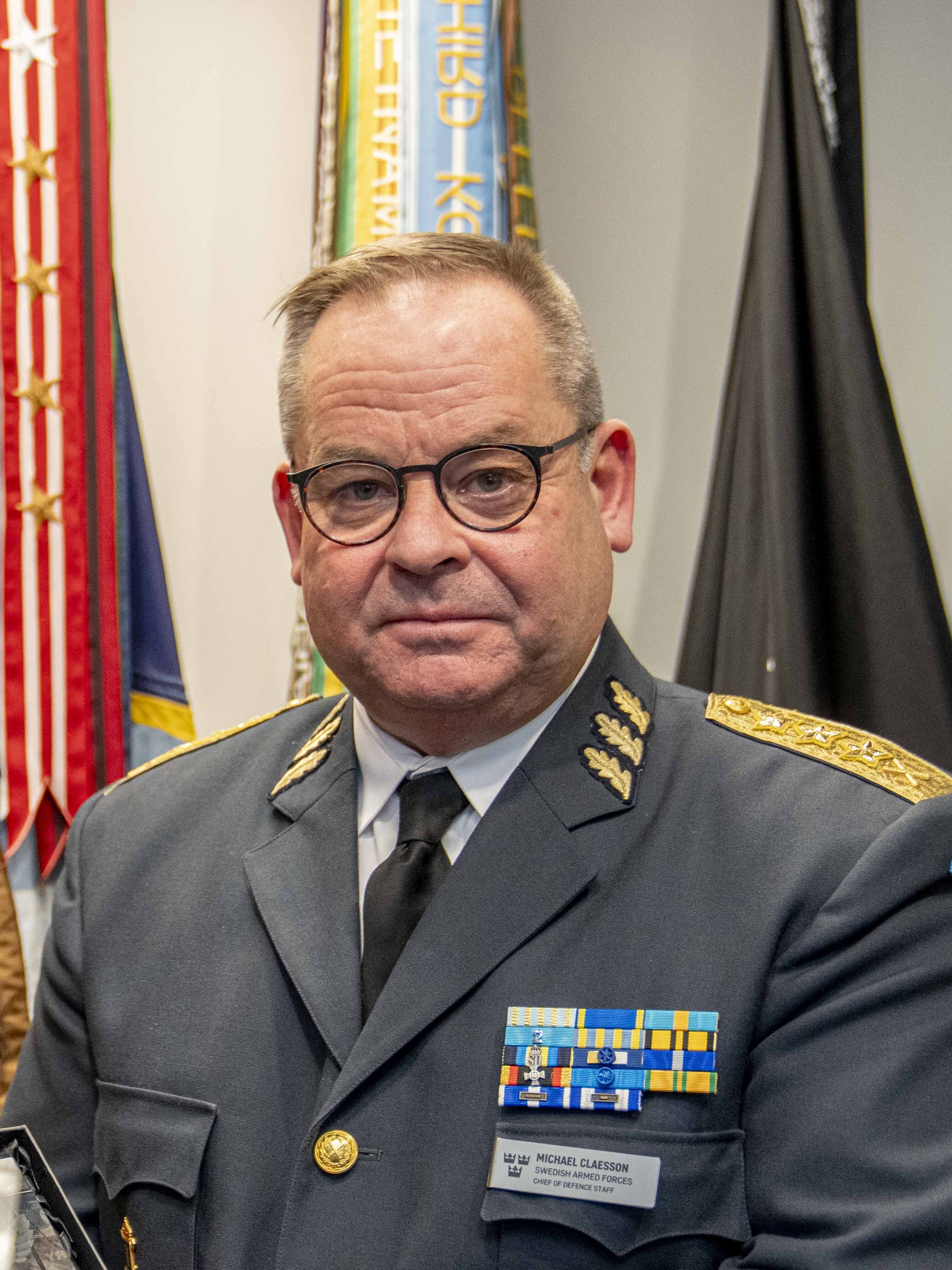
Gen. Michael Claesson, the Chief of Defence of the Swedish Armed Forces.

When an army based on national service (conscription) was introduced in 1901 all commissioned officers had ranks that were senior of the warrant officers (underofficerare) and non-commissioned officers (underbefäl). In a reform 1926 the relative rank of the then senior warrant officer, fanjunkare, was increased to be equal with the junior officer rank underlöjtnant and above the most junior officer rank fänrik. In 1960 the relative rank of the warrant officers were elevated further so that

- i. The lowest warrant officer, sergeant, had relative rank just below the lowest officer rank, fänrik.
- ii. The second warrant officer rank, fanjunkare, had relative rank between fänrik and löjtnant
- iii. The highest warrant officer rank, förvaltare, had relative rank between first lieutenant and captain.

In 1972 the personnel structure changed, reflecting increased responsibilities of warrant and non-commissioned officers, renaming the underofficerare as kompaniofficerare, giving them the same ranks as company grade officers (fänrik, löjtnant, kapten). Underbefäl was renamed plutonsofficerare and given the rank titles of sergeant and fanjunkare, although their relative rank were now placed below fänrik. The commissioned officers were renamed regementsofficerare, beginning with löjtnant. The three-track career system was maintained, as well as three separate messes.

A major change in the personnel structure in 1983 (NBO 1983), merged the three professional corps of platoon officers, company officers, and regimental officers into a one-track career system within a single corps called professional officers (yrkesofficerare). The three messes were also merged to one.

In 2008 the Riksdag decided to create a two-track career system with a category called specialistofficerare. When implementing the parliamentary resolution the Supreme Commander decided that some ranks in this category should, like the old underofficerare ranks in 1960–1972, have a relative rank higher than the most junior officers.

== Planned expansion ==
=== Budget and personnel numbers ===
The Swedish government has decided to increase the military budget to 2.6 percent of GDP by 2028. Furthermore, by 2030, they plan to increase the number of conscripts to 10,000 and to have a standing force of four brigades. In 2027, the budget for military research will increase by 50% to 1.6 billion SEK. By 2030, the number of employees is expected to increase to 115,000, and to 130,000 by 2035.

Planned military budget

Year	Budget	SEK
2025	2.4% of BNP	143 Billion
2027	2.5% of BNP	156 Billion
2028	2.6% of BNP	173 Billion
2028	2.6% of BNP	186 Billion

=== Equipment purchases ===
Sweden has also put an order on 44 Leopard 2 tanks and will renovate 66 of the ones they have in their current arsenal (for 22 billion SEK). Alongside these renovations, they will also modernise their Combat Vehicle 90 vehicles (until 2030). Furthermore, the armed forces have placed an order for 575 trucks from Scania and Volvo. They will cost approximately 1.4 billion SEK and are expected to be delivered between 2025 and 2026. An effort to modernise the army's firearms was made in 2023 by purchasing a large quantity of weapons in collaboration with Finland from the Finnish manufacturer Sako. The weapons will be delivered during a 10 year period.

The Swedish Navy has placed an order for two new working ships from Astilleros Armon Vigo SA. They are expected to be delivered between 2027 and 2028 and are intended to replace HMS Pelikanen and HMS Furusund. The Swedish fleet of Stridsbåt 90s will also be strengthened, with 10 units ordered from Saab in 2024 for approximately 400 million SEK. The Swedish Navy will also receive four airdefence frigates between 2030 and 2033. The French FDI frigate was selected by the Swedish government in May 2026.

== Other government agencies reporting to the Ministry of Defence ==
- Swedish Defence Materiel Administration, or Försvarets materielverk (FMV)
- Swedish National Service Administration, or Plikt- och prövningsverket
- Swedish Defence University, or Försvarshögskolan
- Swedish National Defence Radio Establishment, or Försvarets radioanstalt (FRA)
- Swedish Defence Research Agency, or Totalförsvarets forskningsinstitut (FOI)
- Swedish Civil Defence and Resilience Agency, or Myndigheten för civilt försvar (MCF)

== Voluntary defence organisations ==
- Home Guard
- Swedish Women's Voluntary Defence Organisation ("Lottorna")

== See also ==
- Sweden–NATO relations
- Scandinavian defence union
- Origins of Swedish conscription system
- Swedish Fortifications Agency
- Swedish National Inspectorate of Strategic Products
- List of wars involving Sweden
