= Torped 47 =

- Type: Lightweight ASW torpedo
- Place of origin: Sweden

Service history
- In service: 2022
- Used by: Swedish Navy; Finnish Navy

Production history
- Designed: 2015
- Manufacturer: Saab Dynamics

Specifications
- Mass: approx. 340 kg
- Length: 2,850 mm (112 in)
- Diameter: 400 mm (16 in)
- Warhead: IM compliant, omnidirectional, PBX
- Warhead weight: approx. 50 kg AS(u)W
- Engine: Electric DC motor with gearbox
- Drive: Pumpjet
- Propellant: lithium-based rechargeable battery
- Operational range: ≥20 km (>1h), prepared for ≥50 km
- Maximum depth: +300 m
- Maximum speed: +40 kts
- Guidance system: Active and passive (fully digital), prepared for HF. Hydro-acoustic homing combined with galvanic wire/optic fibre guidance and on-board computer
- Launch platform: Stationary, surface vessels, submarines, helicopters and airplanes

The Torped 47 or SLWT (Saab’s Lightweight Torpedo) is a new lightweight torpedo intended for ASW and surface targets, providing multiple-target active/passive homing combined with wire guidance. It is designed and manufactured by Saab Dynamics as a replacement for the Torped 45.

The torpedo is designed for the Swedish Navy and it will be equipped with both a passive and an active homing device and use wire communication like the Torpedo 45, using a galvanic wire (later also an optical wire).

Torpedo 47 can be launched from a variety of platforms including stationary, surface vessels, submarines and helicopters. It is specifically designed to operate against littoral submarine targets and surface vessels. It is controlled using wire guidance and has a hydro-acoustic homing system for the final phase. The torpedo has features that are unique for lightweight torpedoes.

Torped 47 was selected by the Finnish Navy as part of the Squadron 2020 program and will be installed on the Hamina-class during MLU and the new Pohjanmaa-class corvette.

In October 2022 Saab delivered the first Torped 47 to the Swedish FMV. Torped 47 was officially delivered to the Swedish Navy in December 2022.

In November 2023 Torped 47 was delivered to the Finnish Navy with acceptance firings being performed by two Hamina-class fast attack craft following their mid-life upgrade.

In April 2025, a torpedo was tested from the CB90.

== Technologies ==
The torpedo is using a rechargeable lithium iron phosphate battery. For the propulsion, a pumpjet is used, and it replaces the historic contra-rotating propellers. The propulsion enables a wide range of velocity.

Regarding the electronics, it uses a two-ways datalink with the launch platform through a copper wire. It also uses a highly accurate navigation system. And for the homing, detection, classification and tracking of the targets, the MS4 head, which has passive and active capabilities, is being used.

Some parts will be used by the Torped 63, the future heavyweight torpedo of Saab and the Swedish Navy.

=== Potential upgrades ===
Saab and the Swedish Navy mentioned several options for a more advanced variant:

- Lithium nickel manganese cobalt oxide battery as a more energetically dense option. The lithium iron phosphate battery was selected as a low risk short term option, and a more capable battery is an option.
- Changing the torpedo head with a wideband (multi-frequency) acoustic homing head.
- Improvement of the wake homing performance.
- Replacement of the copper wire with a fibre optic cable.
- Widening its capacity to be used as an anti-torpedo torpedo, and an anti-autonomous underwater vehicle.

== Variants ==
Saab is developing a heavy weight torpedo, the Torped 63, based on the technologies of the Torped 47. This development is undertaken in collaboration with the FMV, the Swedish Defence Research Agency and the Swedish Armed Forces.

== Operators ==
=== Current operators ===
Swedish Navy
The Swedish Navy operates and will operate the SLWT (Torped 47) with:
- Submarines:
  - Current submarines:
    - Södermanland class (A17)
    - Gotland class (A19)
  - Future submarines:
    - Blekinge class (A26)
- Surface vesseles:
  - Current vessels
    - Visby class
    - Gävle-class
  - Future vessels:
    - Luleå class
    - CB90 HSM class
Finnish Navy
The Finnish Navy currently operates the SLWT with the Hamina class. It was introduced on the ships following the midlife upgrade of the class in 2023. The torpedoes are launched from the M/20 torpedo launchers.
The Finnish Navy will also operate the SLWT from the future class corvettes, the Pohjanmaa class.

=== Potential operators ===
Polish Navy
The Polish Navy selected the A26 as their future submarine. The Polish Navy will likely operate the SWLT on this submarine.
