= HSwMS Norrköping =

HSwMS Norrköping includes the following ships of the Swedish Navy

- HSwMS Norrköping (J10), a Göteborg-class destroyer, launched 1940, sunk as target 1977
- HSwMS Norrköping (T131), a Norrköping-class missile boat, launched 1972, decommissioned 2005
- HSwMS Norrköping, a ship of the upcoming Luleå-class corvette

== See also ==
- Norrköping
