= Lätt trossbåt =

Swedish combat support boat type

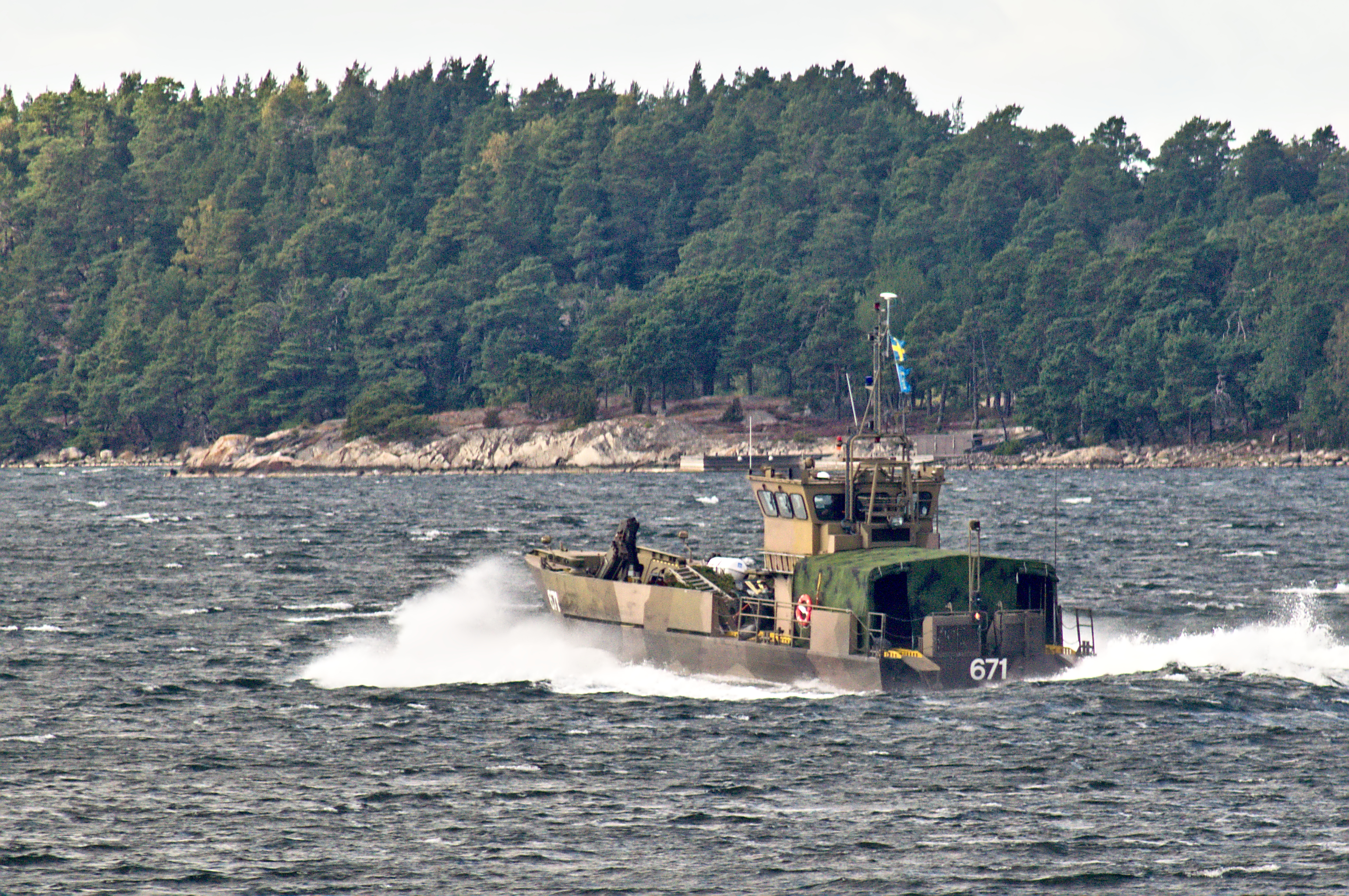
- Lätt trossbåt 671 off the coast of Ornö

Class overview
- Name: Lätt trossbåt
- Builders: Swede Ship Marine
- Operators: Swedish Navy
- Succeeded by: Trossbåt 600
- Built: 1995–1999
- Planned: 16
- Completed: 16
- Active: 16

General characteristics
- Type: Combat support boat
- Displacement: 65 tonnes (64 long tons)
- Length: 24.6 m (80 ft 9 in)
- Beam: 5.4 m (17 ft 9 in)
- Draught: 0.93 m (3 ft 1 in)
- Propulsion: 3 × Scania DSI14 V8
- Speed: 30 knots (56 km/h; 35 mph)+ standard; 23 knots (43 km/h; 26 mph) fully loaded
- Complement: 3 (two officers and one engineer); Up to 18 amphibious troops with full equipment
- Sensors & processing systems: 1 × PNM-858 radar
- Armament: 1 × 12.7 mm Kulspruta 88; Naval mines

Lätt trossbåt (English: Light tross boat) is a combat support boat built for the Swedish Navy by Swede Ship Marine between 1995 and 1999 and now used by the Swedish Amphibious Corps.

== Design ==
The boat has a hull made out of aluminum with a length 24.6 m (80 ft 9 in) and beam of 5.4 m (17 ft 9 in), this gives it the space to fit three seamen as well as 18 fully equipped amphibious troops.
