= Torped 45 =

- Type: Lightweight ASW torpedo
- Place of origin: Sweden

Service history
- In service: 1995–today
- Used by: Swedish Navy; Pakistan Navy; Finnish Navy

Production history
- Designed: 1995
- Manufacturer: Saab Dynamics
- Variants: Mod 1

Specifications
- Mass: 320 kg
- Length: 2,850 mm
- Diameter: 400 mm
- Engine: Electric DC motor with gearbox
- Guidance system: Hydro-acoustic homing combined with wire guidance and on-board computer
- Launch platform: Stationary, surface vessels, submarines and helicopters

The Torped 45 is a lightweight torpedo intended for ASW and surface targets, providing multiple-target active/passive homing combined with wire guidance. It is designed and manufactured by Saab Dynamics and was designed for the Swedish Navy, based on the experience gathered from the well-proven 43-series of torpedoes.

Torpedo 45 can be launched from a variety of platforms including stationary, surface vessels, submarines, and helicopters, specifically designed to operate against shallow-water targets and surface vessels. It is controlled using wire guidance and has a hydro-acoustic homing system for the final phase. The torpedo has features that are unique for lightweight torpedoes.

- It combines wire guidance and homing control
- It can be launched from submarines, surface vessels, and helicopters
- It can be wire-guided from a flying or hovering helicopter (no parachute necessary)
- Its warhead has a main charge large enough to take out any conventional submarine or seriously damage light surface vessels

In exercise torpedo launches, the warhead is replaced by an exercise head carrying identical homing equipment. Instead of explosives, the exercise head has a tape recorder for logging a number of torpedo functions, communication with fire-control and hit indications. After each run, the recordings are analysed and torpedo and fire-control functions are checked.

The Torped 45 is set to be replaced by the newer Torped 47 in Swedish Service fully 2024.

== Operators ==
- Finnish Navy
- Pakistan Navy
- Swedish Navy: Tp 45
