= HSwMS Furusund =

Swedish minelayer ship

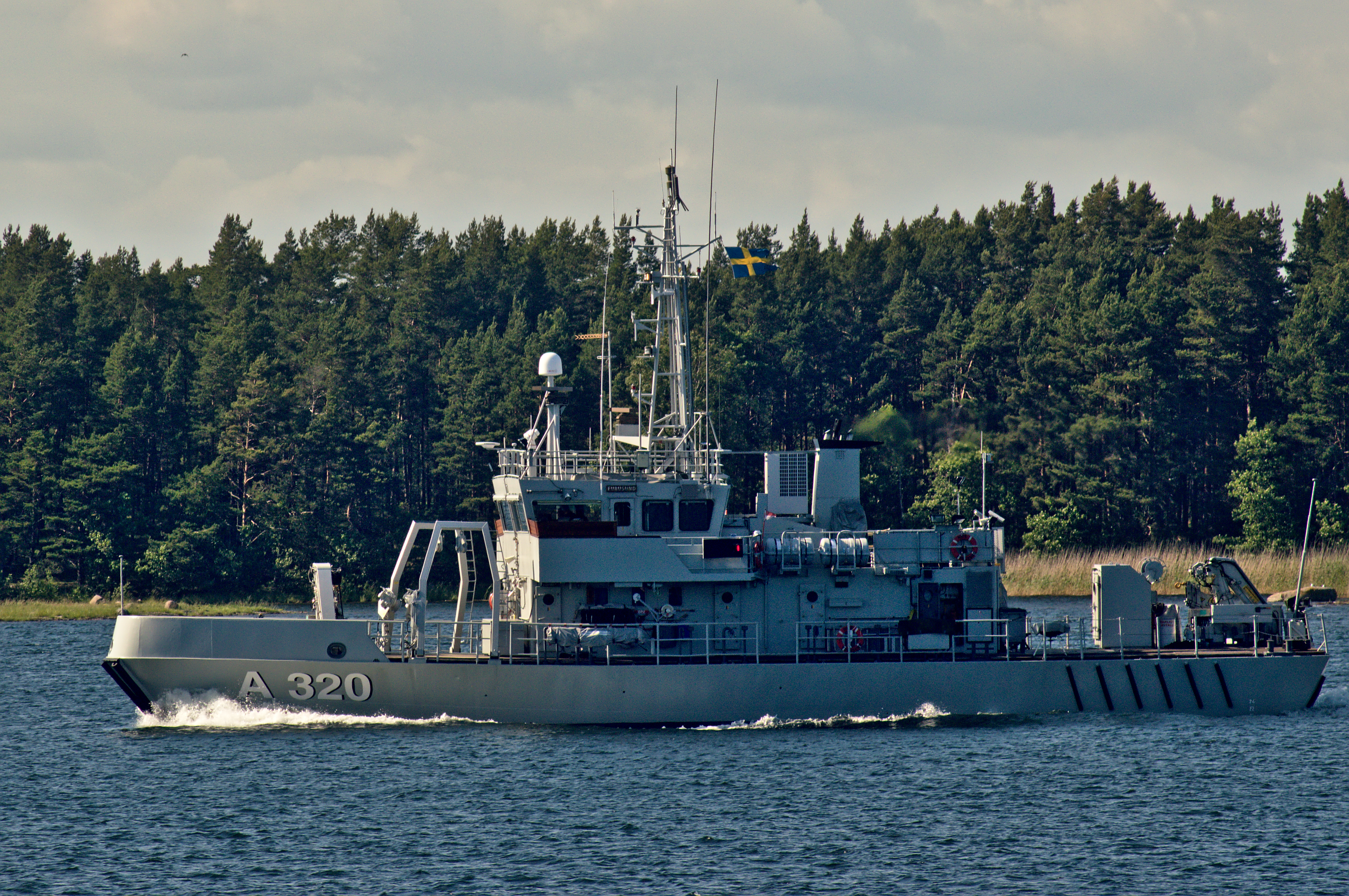

HSwMS Furusund is a ship of the Swedish Navy, delivered in 1986 as a prototype replacement for the Type 12 minelaying ship. Her home port is Berga, and she was built at Åsieverken in Åmål. The primary assignments for the ship and its crew include diving, salvage operations, and underwater work. In 2024, two new ships were ordered from Astilleros Armon Vigo SA to replace HSwMS Furusund and HSwMS Pelikanen, with delivery to the Swedish Armed Forces planned for 2027 and 2028 respectively. The new vessels will combine the roles of both ships in a single, modernised platform capable of torpedo recovery, underwater operations, and diving support.

== Notable missions ==
- HSwMS Furusund took part in the salvage of the bow indicator of MS Estonia.
