= Koster-class mine countermeasures vessel =

Swedish mine countermeasures vessel by Saab

Koster-class
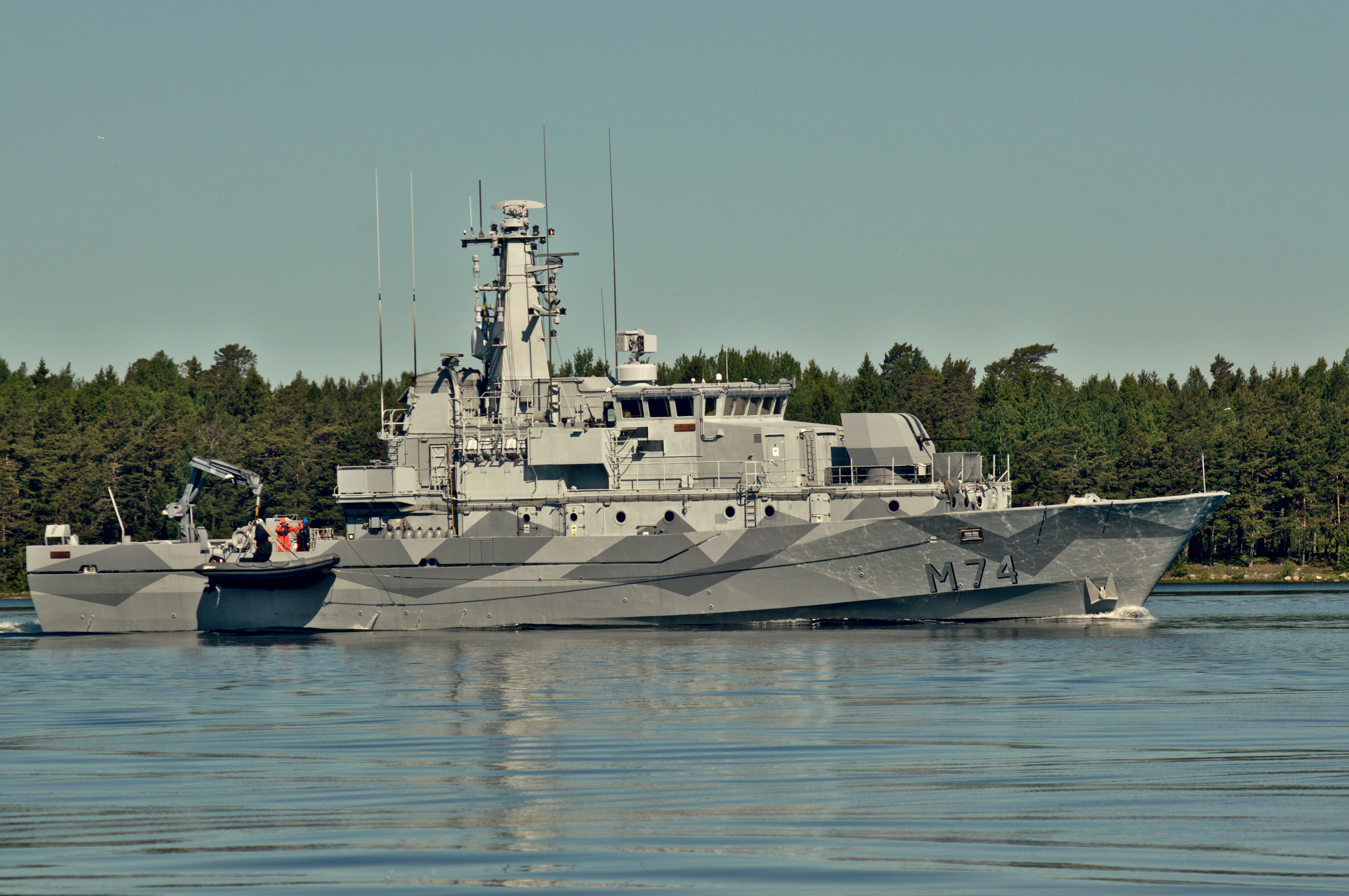
- Kullen outside of Ornö, 2015

Class overview
- Builders: Kockums
- Operators: Swedish Navy
- Built: 1982–1993
- In commission: 1983–present
- Completed: 5 vessels
- Active: 5 vessels

General characteristics
- Displacement: 350 tonnes (340 LT)
- Length: 47.5 metres (155 ft 10 in)
- Beam: 9.6 metres (31 ft 6 in)
- Speed: 15 knots (28 km/h; 17 mph)
- Complement: 28 Seamen
- Armament: 1 × Bofors 40 mm gun; 2 × Ksp 58 machine gun; Mines & depth charges

The Koster-class is a series of mine countermeasures vessels in use by the Swedish Navy. It is one of two subclasses within the Landsort class.

== Overview ==
In December 2004, the Swedish Navy awarded Kockums a contract for the mid-life upgrade for five of the Landsort class (excluding HMS Landsort and HMS Arholma). The upgrade includes a new mine countermeasures (MCM) system, adaptations for international operations as well as a new air defence system involving moving and modification of the Arte 726 from the Kaparen class fast patrol boats. The first is expected to be completed in 2008. The upgraded vessels will be renamed as the Koster class, as the first vessel to be upgraded is HMS Koster (formerly the third ship in the Landsort class).

On 31 January 2005 a contract exceeding €30 million was awarded to Atlas Elektronik for the upgrade of these five vessels with the Atlas Integrated MCM Systems (IMCMS-S). The systems will be commissioned into operational service between 2008 and 2009. The system combines minehunting, minesweeping, mine disposal, surveillance and communication with other naval forces. It comprises an Atlas MCM Tactical Command and Control system, a broadband Atlas HMS-12M hull-mounted sonar and an Atlas mine identification and disposal system (MIDS) Seafox. The IMCMS-S onboard also fully integrates sensors and effectors like the self-propelled variable depth sonar, underwater positioning system, navigation radar and sensors, conventional MIDS systems, and air defence system.

The vessels are also upgraded to have Link 16 capability.

== Units ==
Bow number	Ship name	Launched	Commissioned	Note
M73	Koster	15 August 1986	29 November 1986	In Service
M74	Kullen	15 August 1986	29 November 1986	In Service
M75	Vinga	14 August 1987	27 November 1987	In Service
M76	Ven	18 August 1988	12 December 1988	In Service
M77	Ulvön	4 March 1992	9 October 1992	In Service
