= HSwMS Pelikanen =

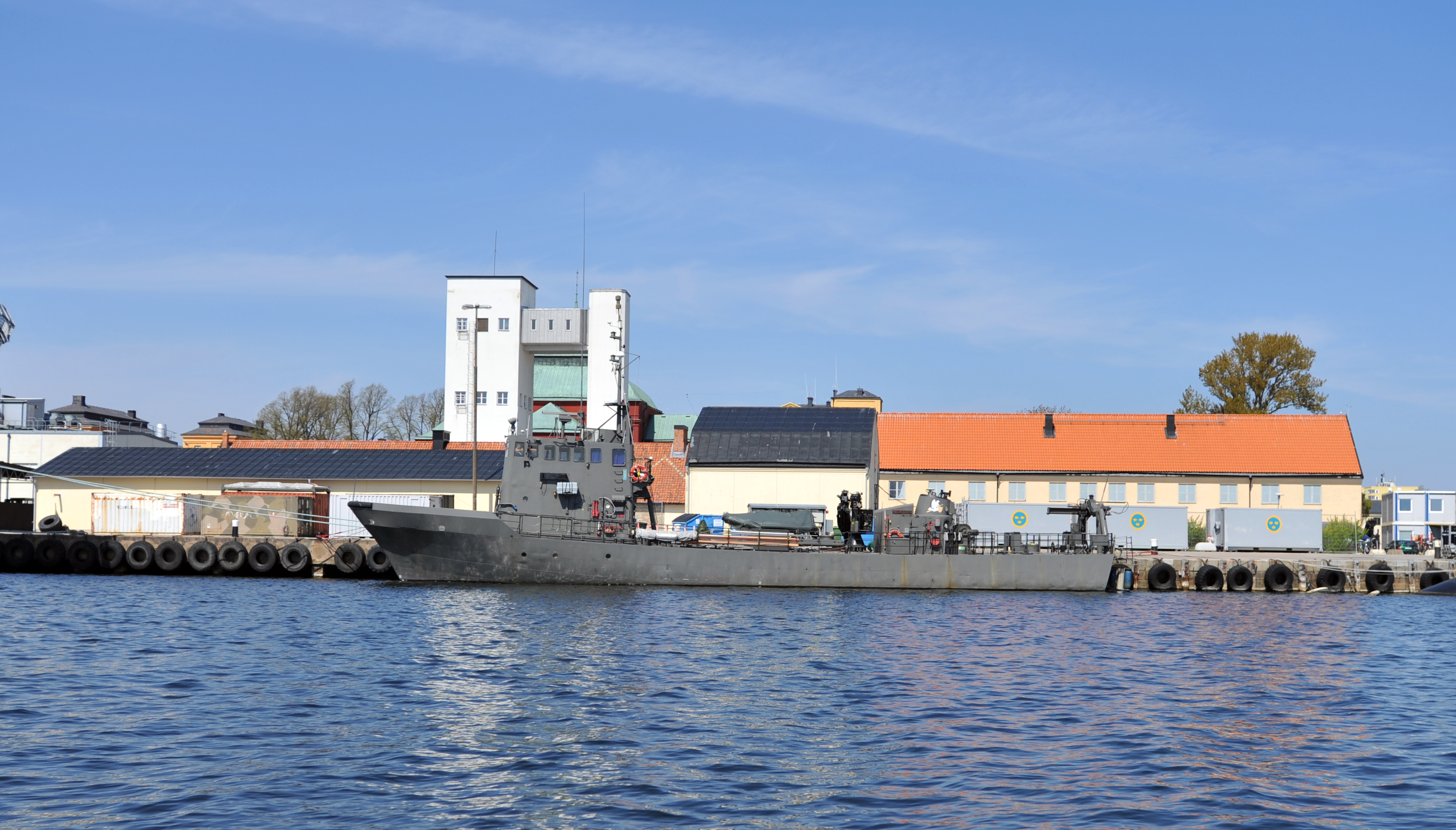

History
- Name: HSwMS Pelikanen

HSwMS Pelikanen is a robot and torpedo salvage ship, the only one of its kind in the Swedish Navy. It is utilized to recover exercise torpedoes deployed by submarines and corvettes of the Swedish Navy. Since 2012, she has been part of the Equipment Company of Karlskrona Naval Base. Prior to that year, she served with the First Submarine Flotilla (Första ubåtsflotiljen). The ship, alongside HSwMS Furusund, is expected to be replaced by two new vessels, which are scheduled for delivery between 2027 and 2028 by Astilleros Armon Vigo SA.

The torpedoes salvaged by Pelikanen are partially lifted using a large crane located at the back of the boat. However, at times, the crew also needs to assist in lifting them. Once salvaged, the torpedoes are transported to land for cleaning and adjustments.
