= Luleå-class frigate =

Swedish frigate class

Luleå class
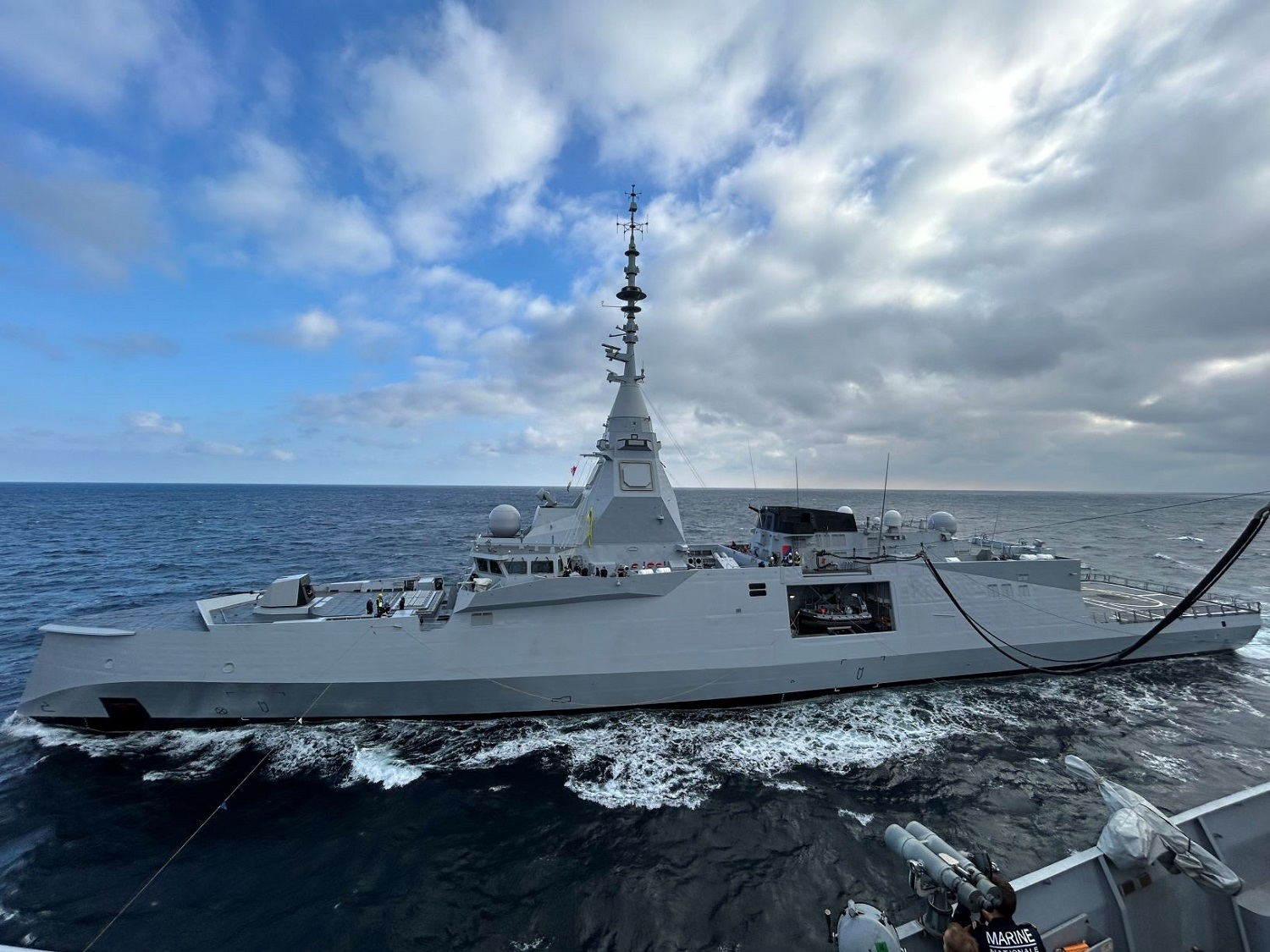
- Refuelling-at-sea test by the French frigate Amiral Ronarc'h, March 2026

Class overview
- Name: Luleå class
- Builders: Naval Group
- Operators: Swedish Navy
- Preceded by: Östergötland class (capability predecessor); Visby class (build sequence)
- In commission: 2030 (expected)
- Planned: 4

General characteristics
- Type: General-purpose frigate
- Displacement: 4,460 t (4,390 long tons)
- Length: 122 m (400 ft 3 in)
- Beam: 17.7 m (58 ft 1 in)
- Propulsion: CODAD (Combined diesel and diesel): 2 × 2 MTU 16V 8000 M91L with a combined output of 32 MW (43,000 shp) (each line driving two shafts fitted with controllable-pitch propellers via reduction gearboxes)
- Speed: ≤ 27 knots (50 km/h; 31 mph)
- Range: 5,000 nmi (9,300 km; 5,800 mi) (at 15 knots (28 km/h; 17 mph))
- Endurance: 45 days
- Complement: 125 (+ 28 passengers)
- Sensors & processing systems: Systems; Combat management system: Naval Group Setis® 3.0; Sonars: Thales CAPTAS-4 Compact towed array variable depth sonar (ASW); Thales KingKlip Mk2 hull-mounted sonar (ASW, obstacle tracking, navigation); Radars: 4 × panel fixed array Thales SeaFire 500 4D, S-band (IEEE), AESA, GaN multi-function radar; Saab Giraffe 1X 3D, X-band (IEEE), AESA, GaN multi-function radar; Terma SCANTER 6002 naval surveillance radar / helicopter approach; Thales BlueGate E-scan IFF system; Electro-optical sensors: 1 × Safran PASEO XLR EO / IR and FCS; 1 × Saab CEROS 500 EO-FCS; 1 × Saab CEROS 200 EO-FCR; Navigation: Exail Marins M3 INS (inertial navigation system); Netans DDU (Data Distribution Units); Terma SCANTER 2602 X-band navigation radar; Wärtsilä NACOS X-band navigation radar; Communications: Thales Aquilon digital communication system; Link 16 and Link 22 data links; SATCOM; Alseamar 2 × UHF (AS 329-1A), 1 × enclosed UHF (AS 307-B), 1 × V/UHF (AS 262-2A)
- Electronic warfare & decoys: Systems: Thales Sentinel R-ESM; Thales ALTESSE-H C-ESM; Saab Laser Warning receiver LWS 310 Mk2; Counter-measures: Naval Group CMLS with CANTO anti-torpedo decoys; Lacroix SYLENA Mk1 (SEACLAD ammunition)
- Armament: Torpedoes: SLWT (Torped 47) ASW lightweight torpedo(launched from the Saab Dynamics Tub m/20); Missiles: Sylver VLS for air defence missiles: 1 to 3 × Sylver A50 8-cell VLS with Aster 30 Block 1NT; 1 × 24 Sylver CL with CAMM-ER; 2 × 4-cell RBS 15 Mk4 Gungnir anti-ship missiles; Guns: 1 × Bofors 57 Mk3b (with 57×438mm Bofors 3P airburst rounds); 1 × Bofors 40 Mk4 (with 40×365mm Bofors 3P airburst rounds); Multiple Saab Trackfire ARES RWS (with M230LF Bushmaster - 30×113mm airburst rounds), FN MAG 58 - 7.62×51mm NATO)
- Aircraft carried: 1 × NH90; 1 × UMS Skeldar V-200
- Aviation facilities: Helicopter hangar (for 1 helicopter and 1 UAV); Flight deck

The Luleå class is a Swedish frigate class derived from the French FDI class. In total four ships are planned to be built. The first two ships are to be commissioned by 2030 and two more by 2035. In June 2023 it was announced that the four ships would receive names after Swedish coastal cities: HSwMS Luleå, HSwMS Norrköping, HSwMS Trelleborg, and HSwMS Halmstad.

== Development ==
In January 2021 Saab Kockums was awarded a contract for the product definition phase of the Visby gen 2 corvettes by the Swedish Defence Materiel Administration (FMV). These ships were intended to be an evolved version of the Visby-class corvettes currently in service with the Swedish Navy. However, a rapidly changing geopolitical situation in large part due to the 2022 Russian invasion of Ukraine and Sweden's subsequent application to join NATO led to the cancellation of the Visby gen 2 in favour of a clean sheet design, the Luleå class.

As the Swedish Navy wants the Luleå class built and commissioned quickly. In 2021 FMV awarded Saab Kockums a contract to study the design of five new corvettes in Sweden. A similar arrangement was also used for the construction of HSwMS Artemis. By 2023, however, the program’s requirements were revised to be closer to a frigate: the future ships would need extended endurance at sea, increased size (120 metres versus 72 metres for the Visby), and enhanced multi-domain capabilities, including anti-drone operations. These changes led to a reduction in the planned fleet from five to four vessels. The product definition phase was scheduled to conclude by mid-2025, with deliveries of the first units expected from 2030. In May 2024 Saab signed a contract with British shipbuilder Babcock for the design of the future ship class based on the Type 31 frigate. But the collaboration has reportedly yielded limited results, opening the door for alternative solutions. In June 2025 France and Sweden signed a defence roadmap as Naval Group positions the FDI for Swedish surface ship programme.

On 24 November 2025, Swedish Defence Minister Pål Jonson announced that Sweden would choose a supplier for the four Luleå-class frigates in early 2026. Four firms were in competition for the program with three offers: Naval Group, Babcock/Saab, and Navantia, offering an already existing design adapted for Swedish requirements. In early 2026 both Spain and France sent warships to Sweden showing off their concepts for the future Luleå class. On 10 February 2026 Naval group signed a Memorandum of Understanding with the Swedish shipyard Oresund Drydocks AB for future maintenance and service support for Swedish naval vessels.

On 19 May 2026, the Swedish government announced it would buy the four FDI frigates from French company Naval Group, citing the speed of delivery as a key factor in its decision.

=== Offers ===
- Babcock was previously believed to be offering Type 31 frigate to the Swedish Navy, but is now known to be collaborating with Saab on a smaller ship known as the Arrowhead 120.
- Naval Group was offering the FDI Defence and intervention frigate.
- Navantia was offering the Alfa 4000-class frigate.

=== Selection ===
The Swedish Government selected the Naval Group to deliver four FDI frigates in May 2026.

The contract was signed the 31 Aug 2026.

== Design ==
The Luleå class will be the largest ships in service with the Swedish Navy at over 120 metres (390 ft) long. Increased range and endurance will be important factors. The ships will primarily be armed with surface-to-air missiles.

=== Sensors and weapons ===
Although the ships will be built by Naval Group in France they will be fitted with many Swedish weapon systems and sensors like the Robot 15, Giraffe 1X radar, SAAB Trackfire remote weapon stations and Torped 47. The Swedish ships will swap the Oto Melara 76 mm on the French and Greek versions of FDI class for a Bofors 57 mm gun. It will also be equipped with a Bofors 40 mm gun and MBDA CAMM-ER missiles for improved air defence. They will also be serviced and maintained in Sweden.

The FMV ordered 4 Bofors 57mm Mk3 cannons for the ships in October 2026.

== Ships ==
No.	Name	Builder	Status	Contract	Steel cutting	Laid down	Launched	Comm.	Notes
Swedish Navy - 4 planned
TBD	HSwMS Luleå	Naval Group, Lorient, France	Under contract	31 Aug 2026	1 Oct 2026	-	-	2030	
TBD	HSwMS Norrköping	Naval Group, Lorient, France	Under contract	31 Aug 2026	-	-	-	2032	
TBD	HSwMS Trelleborg	Naval Group, Lorient, France	Under contract	31 Aug 2026	-	-	-	2033	
TBD	HSwMS Halmstad	Naval Group, Lorient, France	Under contract	31 Aug 2026	-	-	-	2034	

Planned dates
