= Finland =

Country in Northern Europe

Republic of Finland Suomen tasavalta (Finnish) Republiken Finland (Swedish)
- Flag Coat of arms
- Anthem: Maamme (Finnish); Vårt land (Swedish) (English: "Our Land")
- Location of Finland (dark green) – in Europe (green & dark grey) – in the European Union (green) – [Legend]
- Capital and largest city: Helsinki; 60°10′15″N 24°56′15″E
- Official languages: Finnish; Swedish
- Recognized national languages: Sámi; Karelian; Finnish Kalo; Finnish Sign Language; Finland-Swedish Sign Language
- Recognised regional languages: Skolt Sámi, Inari Sámi (in Inari) (Note: Although legally recognized by Finland as a dialect, the municipality of Rautavaara in 16.11.2026 recognized Savonian as an official language of the municipality alongside Standard Finnish)
- Ethnic groups (2025): 88.3% Finns (Note: Includes Finland-Swedes, Romani, Tatar and Sámi people.); 11.7% others
- Religion (2025): 63.2% Christianity; 61.2% Lutheranism; 1.0% Eastern Orthodoxy; 1.0% other Christian; 35.9% no religion; 0.9% other
- Demonyms: Finnish; Finn
- Government: Unitary parliamentary republic
  - President: Alexander Stubb
  - Prime Minister: Petteri Orpo
- Legislature: Parliament

Independence from Soviet Russia
  - Establishment of Grand Duchy of Finland: 29 March 1809 (from Sweden)
  - Declaration of independence: 6 December 1917
  - Constitution established: 17 July 1919

Area
  - Total: 338,455 km^{2} (130,678 sq mi) (65th)
  - Water (%): 9.71 (2015)

Population
  - 2025 census: ▲5,652,881
  - Density: 18.4/km^{2} (47.7/sq mi) (210th)
- GDP (PPP): 2026 estimate
  - Total: ▲$395.396 billion (60th)
  - Per capita: ▲$70,254 (23rd)
- GDP (nominal): 2026 estimate
  - Total: ▲$338.564 billion (48th)
  - Per capita: ▲$60,156 (19th)
- Gini (2023): 26.6 low inequality
- HDI (2023): ▲0.948 very high (12th)
- Currency: Euro (€) (EUR)
- Time zone: UTC+2 (EET)
  - Summer (DST): UTC+3 (EEST)
- Date format: dd.mm.yyyy
- Calling code: +358
- ISO 3166 code: FI
- Internet TLD: .fi, .ax (Note: The .ax domain is used in Åland.)
- Website finland.fi

Finland, (Note: Finnish: Suomi [ˈsuo̯mi]; Swedish: Finland Swedish pronunciation: [ˈfinlɑnd]) officially the Republic of Finland, (Note: Finnish: Suomen tasavalta; Swedish: Republiken Finland;) is a Nordic country in Northern Europe. It borders Sweden to the northwest, Norway to the north, and Russia to the east, with the Gulf of Bothnia to the west and the Gulf of Finland to the south, opposite Estonia. Its capital and largest city is Helsinki. Finland has a population of 5.7 million. The official languages are Finnish and Swedish, the mother tongues of 83.5 percent and 5.0 percent of the population, respectively. Finland's climate varies from humid continental in the south to boreal in the north. Its land is predominantly covered by boreal forest, with over 180,000 recorded lakes.

Finland was first settled around 9000 BC after the last Ice Age. During the Stone Age, various cultures emerged, distinguished by different styles of ceramics. The Bronze Age and Iron Ages were marked by contacts with other cultures in Fennoscandia and the Baltic region. From the middle of the 13th century, Finland became part of Sweden during the Northern Crusades. In 1809, as a result of the Finnish War, Finland was captured from Sweden and became an autonomous grand duchy within the Russian Empire. During this period, Finnish art flourished and an independence movement gradually developed.

Following the Russian Revolution of 1917, Finland declared its independence. A civil war ensued the following year, with the anticommunist Whites emerging victorious. Finland's status as a republic was confirmed in 1919. During World War II, Finland fought against the Soviet Union in the Winter War and the Continuation War, and later against Nazi Germany in the Lapland War. As a result, it lost parts of its territory to the Soviet Union but retained its independence and democracy. During the Cold War, Finland embraced an official policy of neutrality. After the Cold War, Finland became a member of the European Union in 1995 and the Eurozone in 1999. Following the Russian invasion of Ukraine, Finland joined NATO in 2023.

Finland became the first country in Europe to grant universal suffrage in 1906, and the first in the world to give all adult citizens the right to run for public office. (Note: Finland was the first nation in the world to give all (adult) citizens full suffrage, in other words the right to vote and to run for office, in 1906. New Zealand was the first country in the world to grant all (adult) citizens the right to vote in 1893, but women did not get the right to run for the New Zealand legislature until 1919.) Finland remained a largely rural and agrarian country until the 1950s, when it pursued rapid industrialization and a Nordic-style welfare state, resulting in an advanced economy and high per capita income. The country consistently ranks highly in international rankings across various categories, such as education, economic competitiveness, happiness, and prosperity. Finnish foreign policy based on its middle power status emphasizes international cooperation and partnership, which has recently shifted towards closer ties with NATO. Finnish cultural values, including egalitarianism, secularism, human rights, and environmentalism, are actively promoted through membership in multiple international forums.

== Names and etymology ==
Finland is known by two unrelated names: Suomi (Finnish for 'Finland'), used in Finnish and, in corresponding forms, in the other Finnic languages; and Finland, of Old Norse origin, used in Swedish and in most other languages. The origin of both is uncertain. Explanations deriving Suomi from suo ('mire') or suomu ('scale') are rejected on semantic and morphological grounds; current discussion centres on a Baltic loan etymology linking Suomi to the province name Häme and the Sámi endonym sápmi, and on the view that Suomi and sápmi continue a common Finno-Samic self-designation. The Old Norse element finnr behind Finland appears to have been a Scandinavian term for northern neighbours in general, denoting the Sámi in Norwegian usage and the inhabitants of south-western Finland in Swedish usage.

In the earliest historical sources, from the 12th and 13th centuries, the term Finland refers to the coastal region around Turku (Swedish: Åbo) in the southwest of modern Finland; this region later became known as Finland Proper in distinction from the country name Finland. The Latin form Finlandia began to appear in the titles of the bishops of Åbo from 1221.

In the 14th and 15th centuries, the southwest (Eura and Turku), the interior (around Lake Päijänne), and the southeast (reaching Lake Ladoga) regions of modern Finland were incorporated into the Swedish realm; the entire area was called Finlandia et partes orientales by the Scandinavians, and the interior was known as Tavastia. From 1308 Österland ("Eastland"), originally the territories east of Finland Proper, served as the official designation of the eastern part of the realm; from 1464, and especially after 1500, Finland displaced it, and Österlandet appeared in official documents for the last time in 1525. By the end of the Middle Ages, the term Finland had thus been extended to the east as well.

== History ==
=== Prehistory ===
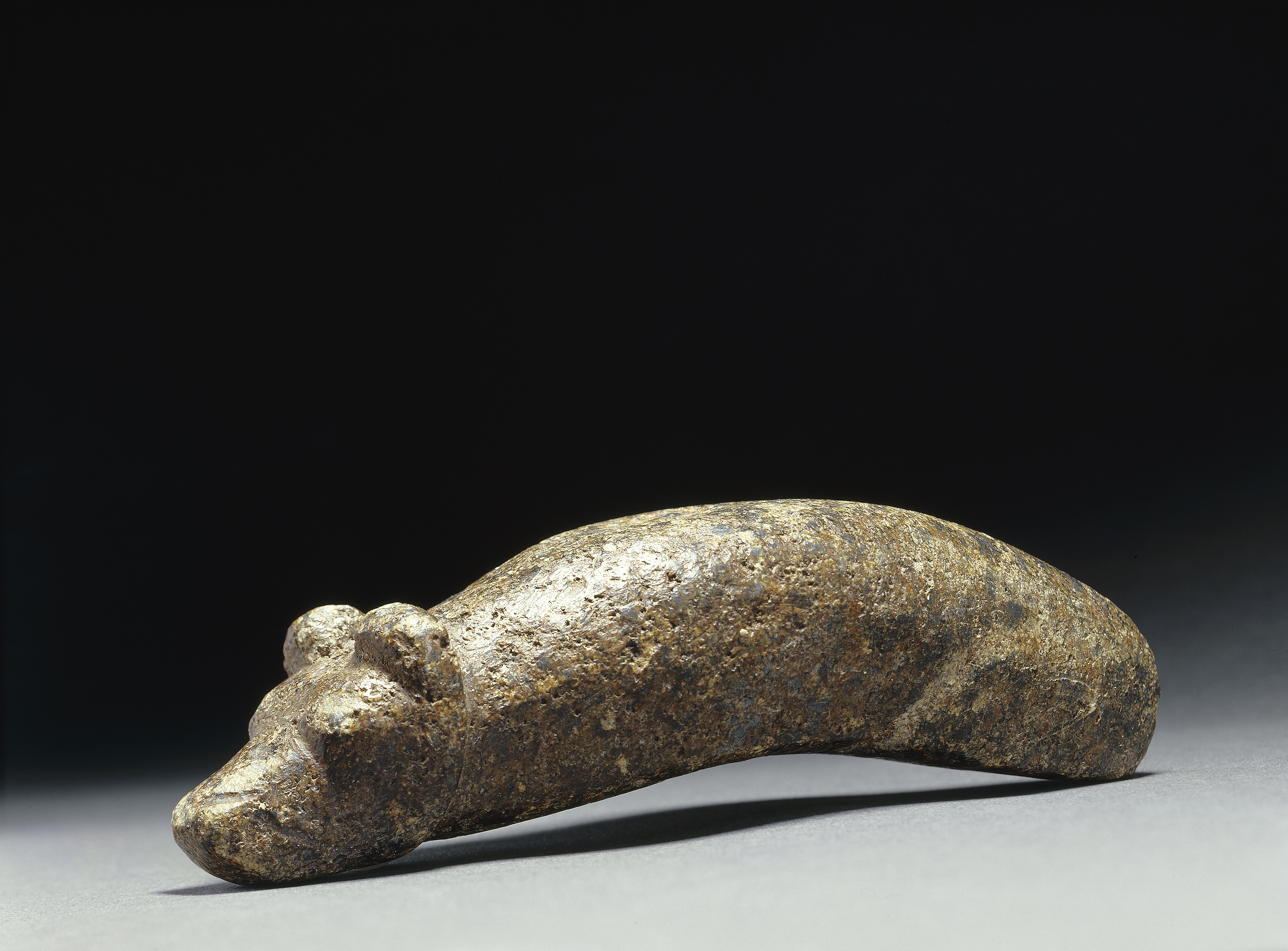
Stone Age bear head gavel found in Paltamo, Kainuu

The area that is now Finland was settled in, at the latest, around 8500 BC during the Stone Age towards the end of the last glacial period. The artefacts the first settlers left behind present characteristics that are shared with those found in Estonia, Russia, and Norway. The earliest people were hunter-gatherers, using stone tools.

The first pottery appeared in 5200 BC, when the Comb Ceramic culture was introduced. The area of present-day Finland was in the western limits of the culture, which produced pottery with a distinct comb pattern. The arrival of the Corded Ware culture in the south of coastal Finland between 3000 and 2500 BC may have coincided with the start of agriculture. Even with the introduction of agriculture, hunting and fishing continued to be important parts of the subsistence economy.

Based upon linguistic evidence, Finland seems to have been primarily inhabited by speakers of Paleo-European languages prior to the migration of the Finno-Ugric peoples, which influenced the Sámi languages who were the first Finno-Ugric peoples to move towards Finland. These languages have been divided into Paleo-Laplandic languages which were spoken around Lapland, and the Lakelandic languages spoken in most of modern-day Finland.

In the Bronze Age, permanent all-year-round cultivation and animal husbandry spread, but the cold climate slowed the change. The Seima-Turbino phenomenon brought the first bronze artefacts to the region and possibly also the Finno-Ugric languages. Commercial contacts that had so far mostly been to Estonia started to extend to Scandinavia. Domestic manufacture of bronze artefacts started 1300 BC.

In the Iron Age, population grew. Finland Proper was the most densely populated area. Commercial contacts in the Baltic Sea region grew and extended during the eighth and ninth centuries. Main exports from Finland were furs, slaves, castoreum, and falcons to European courts. Imports included silk and other fabrics, jewelry, Ulfberht swords, and, in lesser extent, glass. Production of iron started approximately in 500 BC. At the end of the ninth century, indigenous artefact culture, especially weapons and women's jewelry, had more common local features than ever before. This has been interpreted to be expressing common Finnish identity.

An early form of Finnic languages spread to the Baltic Sea region approximately 1900 BC. Common Finnic language was spoken around Gulf of Finland 2000 years ago. The dialects from which the modern-day Finnish language was developed came into existence during the Iron Age. Contacts with the ancient Baltic and eastern Germanic peoples greatly influenced the Proto-Finnic language. Although distantly related, the Sámi people retained the hunter-gatherer lifestyle longer than the Finns. The Sámi cultural identity and the Sámi languages have survived in Lapland, the northernmost province.

=== Swedish era ===
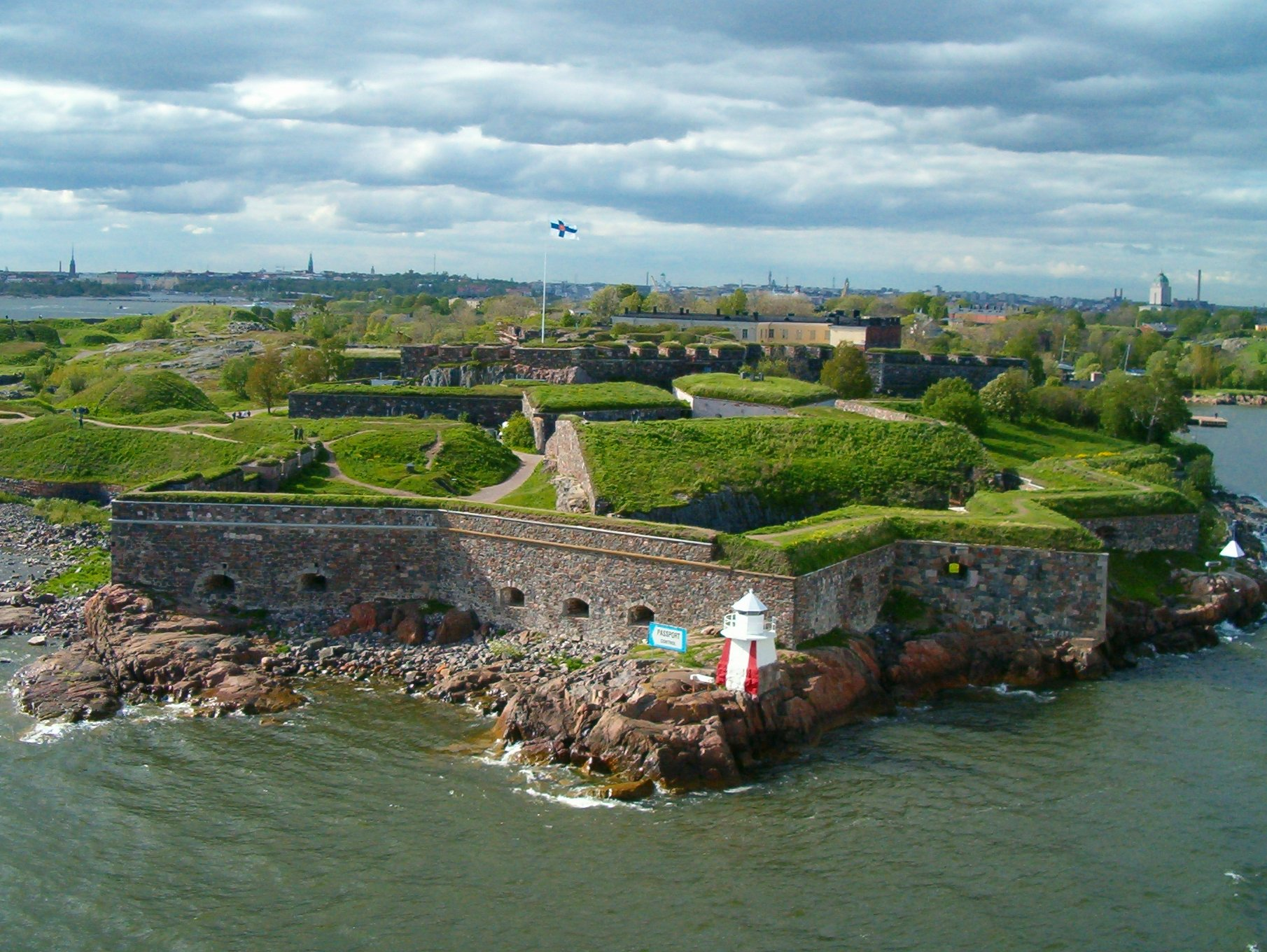
Now lying within Helsinki, Suomenlinna is a UNESCO World Heritage Site consisting of an inhabited 18th-century sea fortress built on six islands. It is one of Finland's most popular tourist attractions.

The 12th and 13th centuries were a violent time in the northern Baltic Sea. The Livonian Crusade was ongoing, and the Finnish tribes, such as the Tavastians and Karelians, were in frequent conflicts with Novgorod and with each other. Also, during the 12th and 13th centuries, several crusades from the Catholic realms of the Baltic Sea area were made against the Finnish tribes. Danes waged at least three crusades to Finland, in 1187 or slightly earlier, in 1191 and in 1202, and the Swedes waged the Second Swedish Crusade to Finland in 1249 against the Tavastians, and the Third Swedish Crusade to Finland in 1293 against the Karelians. The so-called First Swedish Crusade to Finland, possibly in 1155, likely never occurred.

As a result of the Crusades, mostly with the Second Swedish Crusade led by Birger Jarl, and the colonization of some Finnish coastal areas with Christian Swedes during the Middle Ages, Finland gradually became part of the kingdom of Sweden and the sphere of influence of the Catholic Church. Under Sweden, Finland was annexed as part of the cultural order of Western Europe. The Swedes built fortresses in Häme and Turku, while a Swedish royal council was instituted, an administrative structure and fiscal apparatus was created, and law codes were codified during the reigns of Magnus Ladulås (1275–1290) and Magnus Eriksson (1319–1364). As a result, the Finnish lands were firmly integrated into the Swedish realm.

Swedish was the dominant language of the nobility, administration, and education; Finnish was chiefly a language for the peasantry, clergy, and local courts in predominantly Finnish-speaking areas. During the Protestant Reformation, the Finns gradually converted to Lutheranism. The end of the Kalmar Union ushered in an era of religious, social, and economic changes. Gustav Vasa (r. 1523–1560) made his second son Johan the duke of Finland, while Gustav Adolf (r. 1611–1632) created the office of governor-general for Finland as part of his restructuring of the administration of the Swedish realm.

In the 16th century, a bishop and Lutheran Reformer Mikael Agricola published the first written works in Finnish; and Finland's current capital city, Helsinki, was founded by King Gustav Vasa in 1550. The first university in Finland, the Royal Academy of Turku, was established by Queen Christina of Sweden at the proposal of Count Per Brahe in 1640.

The Finns reaped a reputation in the Thirty Years' War (1618–1648) as a well-trained cavalrymen called "Hakkapeliitta". Finland suffered a severe famine in 1695–1697, during which about one third of the Finnish population died, and a devastating plague occurred a few years later.

In the 18th century, wars between Sweden and Russia twice led to the occupation of Finland by Russian forces, times known to the Finns as the Greater Wrath (1714–1721) and the Lesser Wrath (1742–1743). It is estimated that almost an entire generation of young men was lost during the Great Wrath, due mainly to the destruction of homes and farms, and the burning of Helsinki. By 1800, the population in Finland had recovered to around 833,000 people.

=== Grand Duchy of Finland ===
The Swedish era ended with the Finnish War of 1809. On 29 March 1809, after being conquered by the armies of Alexander I of Russia, Finland became an autonomous grand duchy within the Russian Empire, as recognized by the Diet of Porvoo. This situation continued until the end of 1917. In 1812, Alexander I incorporated the Russian province of Vyborg into the Grand Duchy of Finland. In 1854, Finland became involved in Russia's involvement in the Crimean War when the British and French navies bombed the Finnish coast and Åland during the Åland War.

Edvard Isto, The Attack, 1899. The Russian eagle is attacking the Finnish Maiden, trying to steal her book of laws

Although Swedish was still widely spoken, the Finnish language began to gain recognition during this period. From the 1860s, a strong Finnish nationalist movement, known as the Fennoman movement, grew. As a leading Fennoman philosopher and statesman, J. V. Snellman played a decisive role in the 19th-century Finnish national movement by championing the official status of the Finnish language and spearheading the introduction of the Finnish markka in 1865, thereby strengthening the autonomy of the Grand Duchy of Finland. Milestones included the publication of what would become Finland's national epic, the Kalevala, in 1835 and the legal equality of the Finnish language with Swedish in 1892. In the spirit of Adolf Ivar Arwidsson – "we are not Swedes, we do not want to become Russians, so let us be Finns" – a Finnish national identity was established. Nevertheless, there was no real independence movement in Finland until the early 20th century.

The Finnish famine of 1866–1868 occurred after freezing temperatures in early September devastated crops and killed around 15% of the population, making it one of the worst famines in European history. The famine led the Russian Empire to relax financial regulations, and investment increased in the following decades. Economic development was rapid. The gross domestic product (GDP) per capita was still half of that of the United States and a third of that of Britain.

From 1899 to 1917, the Russian Empire pursued a policy of Russification, which was suspended between 1905 and 1908. In 1906, universal suffrage was introduced in the Grand Duchy of Finland. However, relations between the Grand Duchy of Finland and the Russian Empire soured when the Russian government began to take steps to restrict Finland's special status and autonomy. For example, universal suffrage was virtually meaningless in practice, as the tsar did not have to approve any of the laws passed by the Finnish parliament. The desire for independence gained ground, first among radical liberals and socialists, partly driven by a declaration called the February Manifesto by the last tsar of the Russian Empire, Nicholas II, on 15 February 1899.

=== Civil war and early independence ===
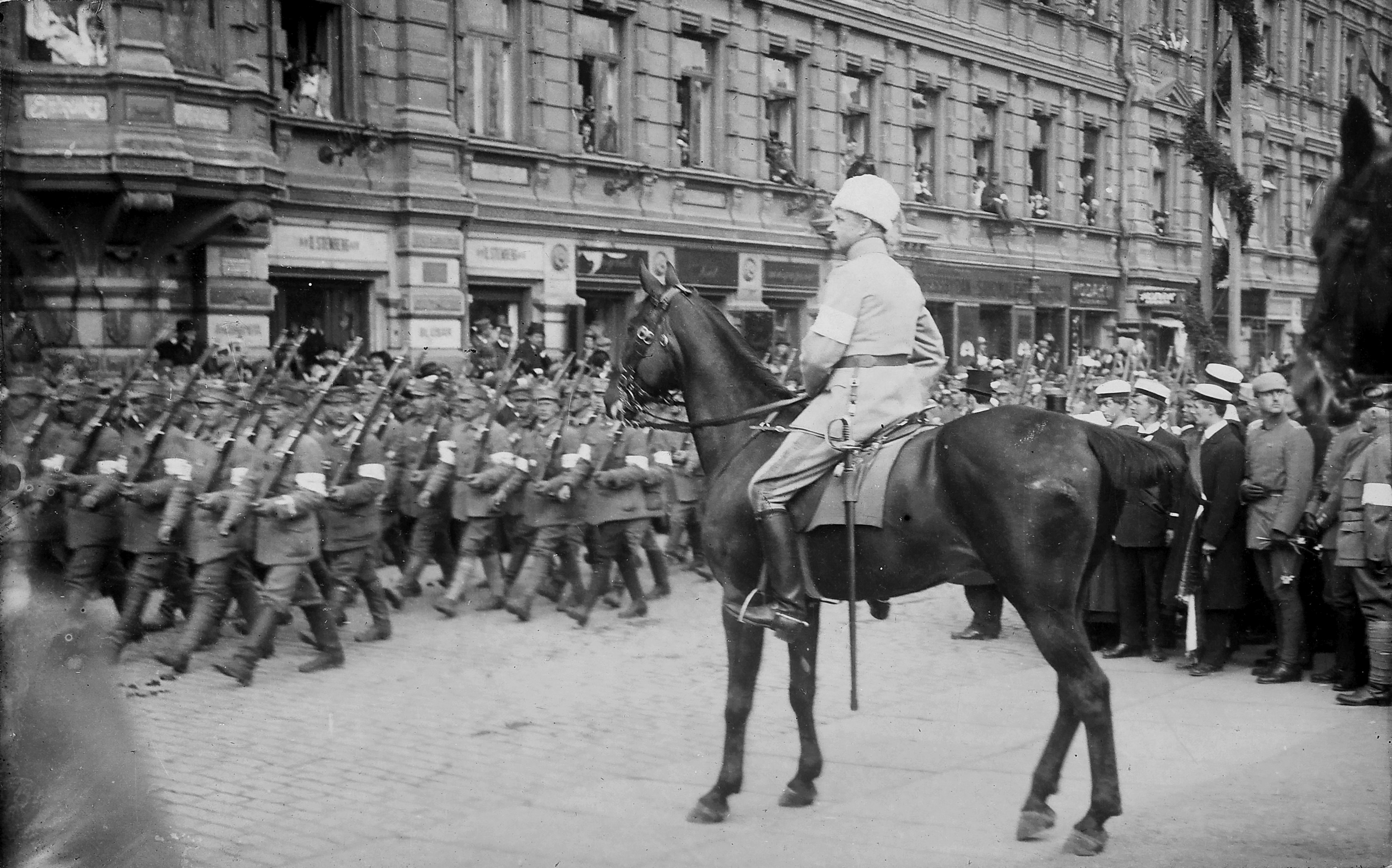
Finnish military leader and statesman C. G. E. Mannerheim as general officer leading the White Victory Parade at the end of the Finnish Civil War in Helsinki, 1918

After the February Revolution of 1917, Finland's position as a Grand Duchy under the rule of the Russian Empire was questioned. The Finnish parliament, controlled by the Social Democrats, passed the so-called Power Act to give the parliament supreme authority. This was rejected by the Russian Provisional Government, which decided to dissolve the parliament. New elections were held in which the right-wing parties won by a small majority. Some social democrats refused to accept the result, claiming that the dissolution of parliament and the subsequent elections were extra-legal. The two almost equally powerful political blocs, the right-wing parties and the Social Democratic Party, were deeply divided.

The October Revolution in Russia changed the geopolitical situation once again. Suddenly the right-wing parties in Finland began to reconsider their decision to block the transfer of supreme executive power from the Russian government to Finland when the Bolsheviks came to power in Russia. The right-wing government, led by Prime Minister P. E. Svinhufvud, presented the Declaration of Independence on 4 December 1917, which was officially approved by the Finnish Parliament on 6 December. The Russian Soviet Federative Socialist Republic (RSFSR), led by Vladimir Lenin was the first country to recognize Finland's independence on 4 January 1918.

On 27 January 1918, the government began to disarm the Russian forces in Ostrobothnia. The socialists took control of southern Finland and Helsinki, but the white government continued in exile in Vaasa. This led to a short but bitter civil war. The Whites, backed by Imperial Germany, prevailed over the Reds and their self-proclaimed Finnish Socialist Workers' Republic. After the war, tens of thousands of Reds were interned in camps where thousands were executed or died of malnutrition and disease. A deep social and political enmity was sown between the Reds and the Whites that would last until the Winter War and beyond. The civil war and the activist expeditions to Soviet Russia in 1918–1920, known as the "Kinship Wars", strained relations with the East.

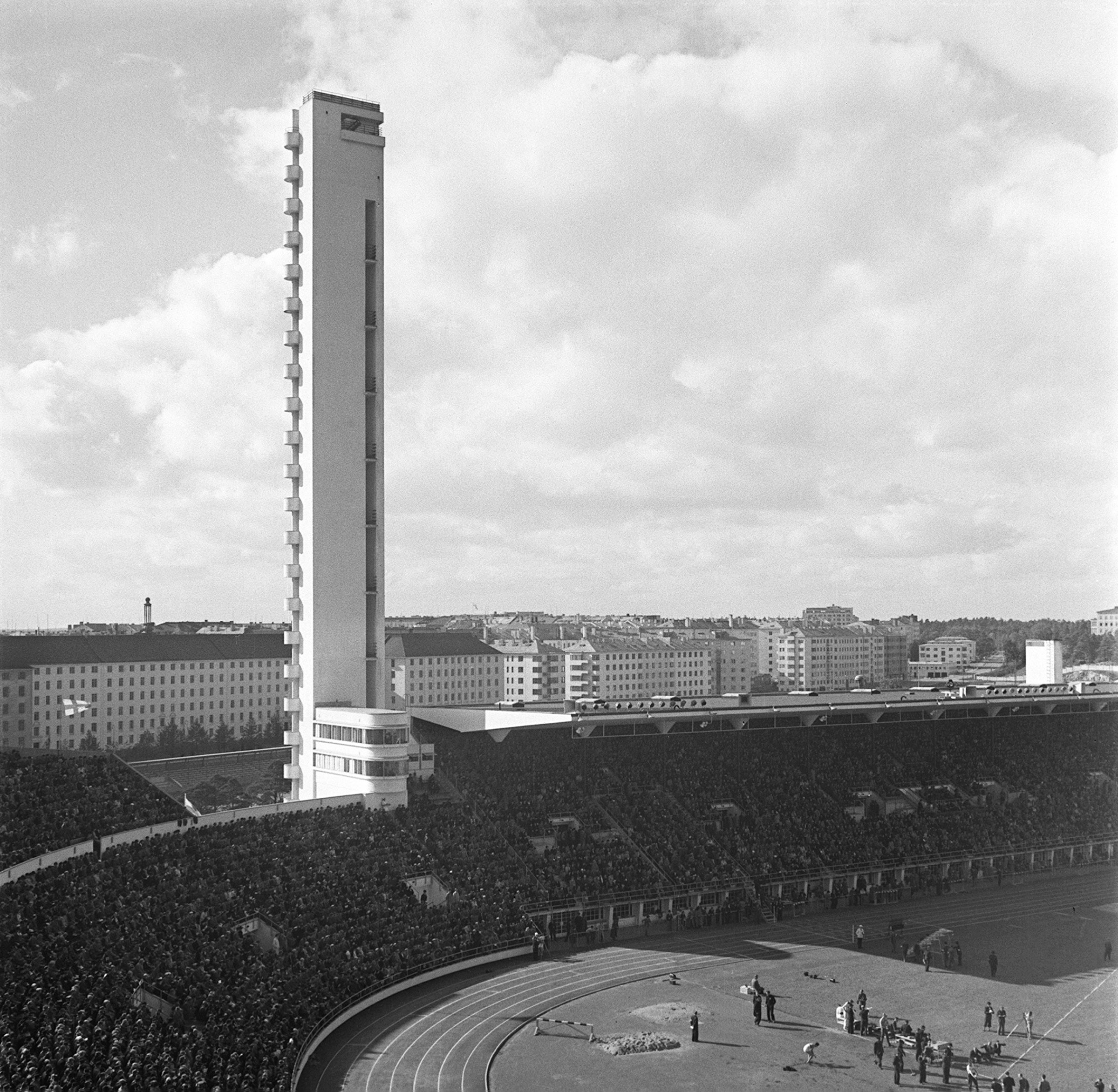
Helsinki Olympic Stadium in 1938

After a brief experiment with monarchy, when an attempt to make Prince Frederick Charles of Hesse the king of Finland failed, a republican constitution was adopted and Finland became a presidential republic, with K. J. Ståhlberg elected as its first president on 25 July 1919. A liberal nationalist with a legal background, Ståhlberg anchored the state in liberal democracy, promoted the rule of law and initiated internal reforms. Finland was also one of the first European countries to strongly promote women's equality, with Miina Sillanpää becoming the first female minister in Finnish history in Väinö Tanner's cabinet in 1926–1927. The Finnish-Russian border was established in 1920 by the Treaty of Tartu, which largely followed the historical border but gave Finland Pechenga (Finnish: Petsamo) and its Barents Sea port. Finnish democracy survived Soviet coup attempts and the anti-communist Lapua movement.

In 1917, there were three million people in the country. After the civil war, a credit-based land reform was introduced, increasing the proportion of the population with access to capital. About 70% of the workforce was employed in agriculture and 10% in industry.

=== World War II ===
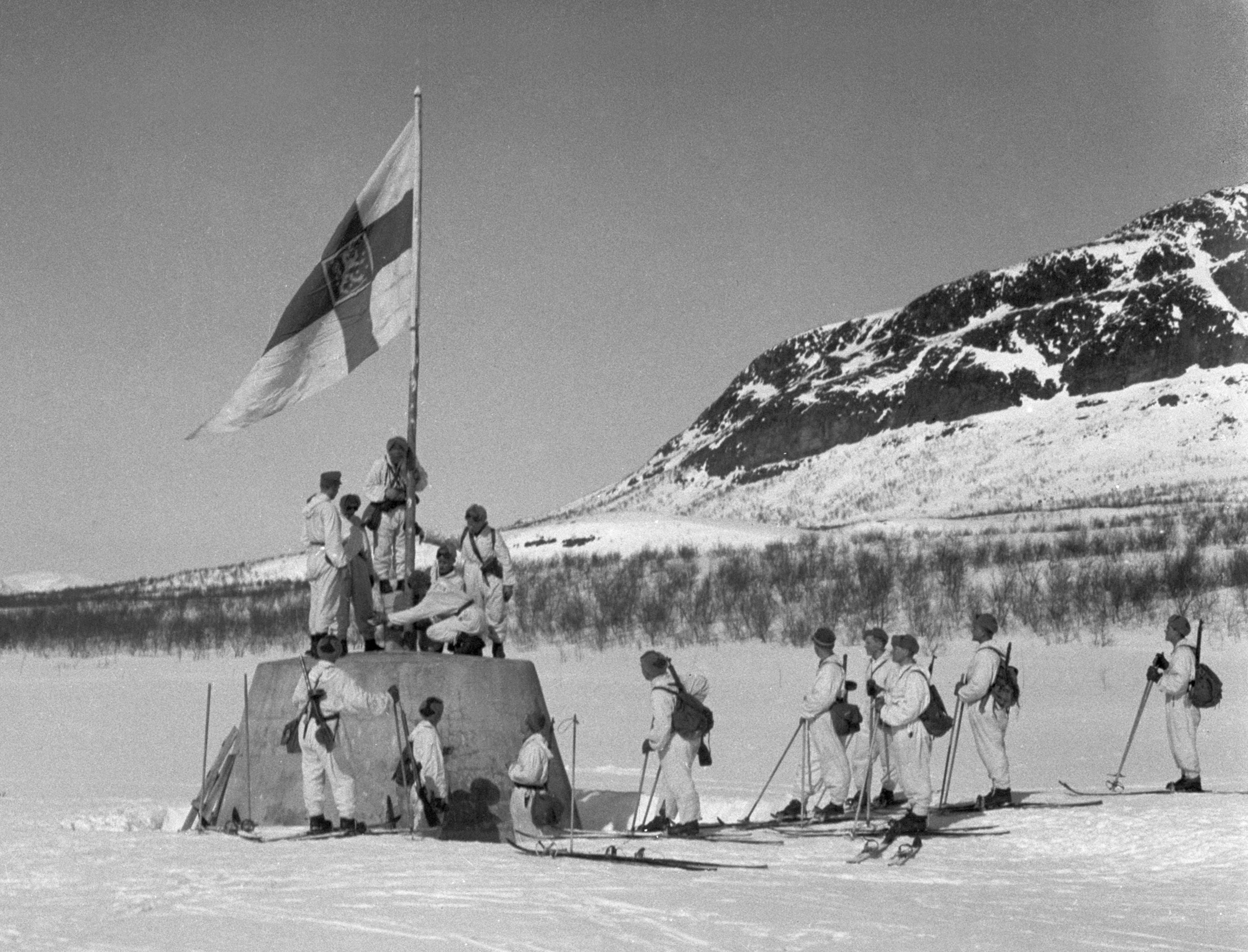
Finnish troops raise a flag on the three-country cairn in April 1945 at the close of the World War II in Finland.

The Soviet Union and Nazi Germany signed the Molotov–Ribbentrop Pact on 23 August 1939, which divided Europe into spheres of influence between the two dictatorships. In accordance with the pact, the Soviet Union launched the Winter War on 30 November 1939 in order to annex Finland. The Finnish Democratic Republic was set up by Joseph Stalin at the beginning of the war to govern Finland after Soviet conquest. There was widespread international condemnation of the unprovoked attack and it led to the Soviet Union being expelled from the League of Nations. The Red Army was defeated in numerous battles, most notably the Battle of Suomussalmi. After two months of negligible progress on the battlefield, as well as heavy losses in men and material, Soviet forces began to advance in February and reached Vyborg (Finnish: Viipuri) in March. The Moscow Peace Treaty was signed on 12 March 1940, and the war ended the following day. Finland had defended its independence, but ceded 9% of its territory to the Soviet Union. Between 1939 and 1944, some 400,000 people were evacuated from Karelia.

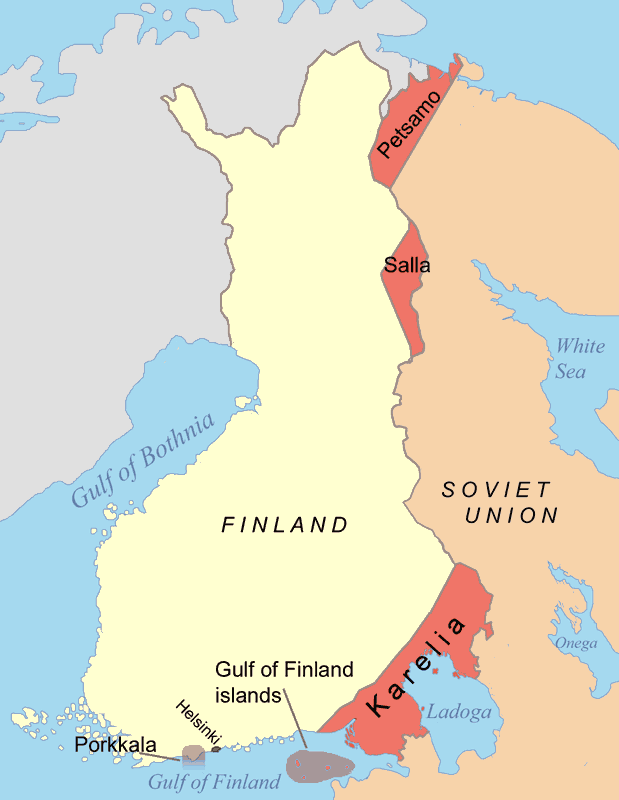
Areas ceded by Finland to the Soviet Union during World War II. The Porkkala land lease was returned to Finland in 1956.

Hostilities resumed in June 1941 with the Continuation War, when Finland allied itself with Germany following the latter's invasion of the Soviet Union; the main aim was to regain the territory lost to the Soviets barely a year earlier. Finnish troops occupied Eastern Karelia from 1941 to 1944 and assisted the German Army in the Siege of Leningrad. The massive Soviet Vyborg–Petrozavodsk offensive in the summer of 1944 led to a breakthrough until the Finns finally repulsed it at Tali–Ihantala. This partial Soviet success led to a stalemate and later an armistice. This was followed by the Lapland War of 1944–1945, when Finland fought retreating German forces in northern Finland.

The armistice and treaty signed with the Soviet Union in 1944 and 1948 included Finnish obligations, restraints, and reparations, as well as further territorial concessions. As a result of the two wars, Finland lost 12% of its land area, 20% of its industrial capacity, its second largest city, Vyborg (Finnish: Viipuri), and the ice-free port of Liinakhamari (Finnish: Liinahamari). The Finns lost around 97,000 soldiers and were forced to pay war reparations initially set at $300 million in 1938 prices, later adjusted to $226.5 million. However, the country avoided occupation by Soviet forces and managed to retain its independence. Along with Great Britain, Finland emerged from the war as one of the only European countries to have taken part in hostilities that was never occupied and managed to preserve its democracy throughout.

In the decades following World War II, the Communists were a strong political party. Furthermore, the Soviet Union persuaded Finland to refuse Marshall Plan aid. However, in the hope of preserving Finland's independence, the United States provided secret development aid and supported the Social Democratic Party.

=== After the war ===
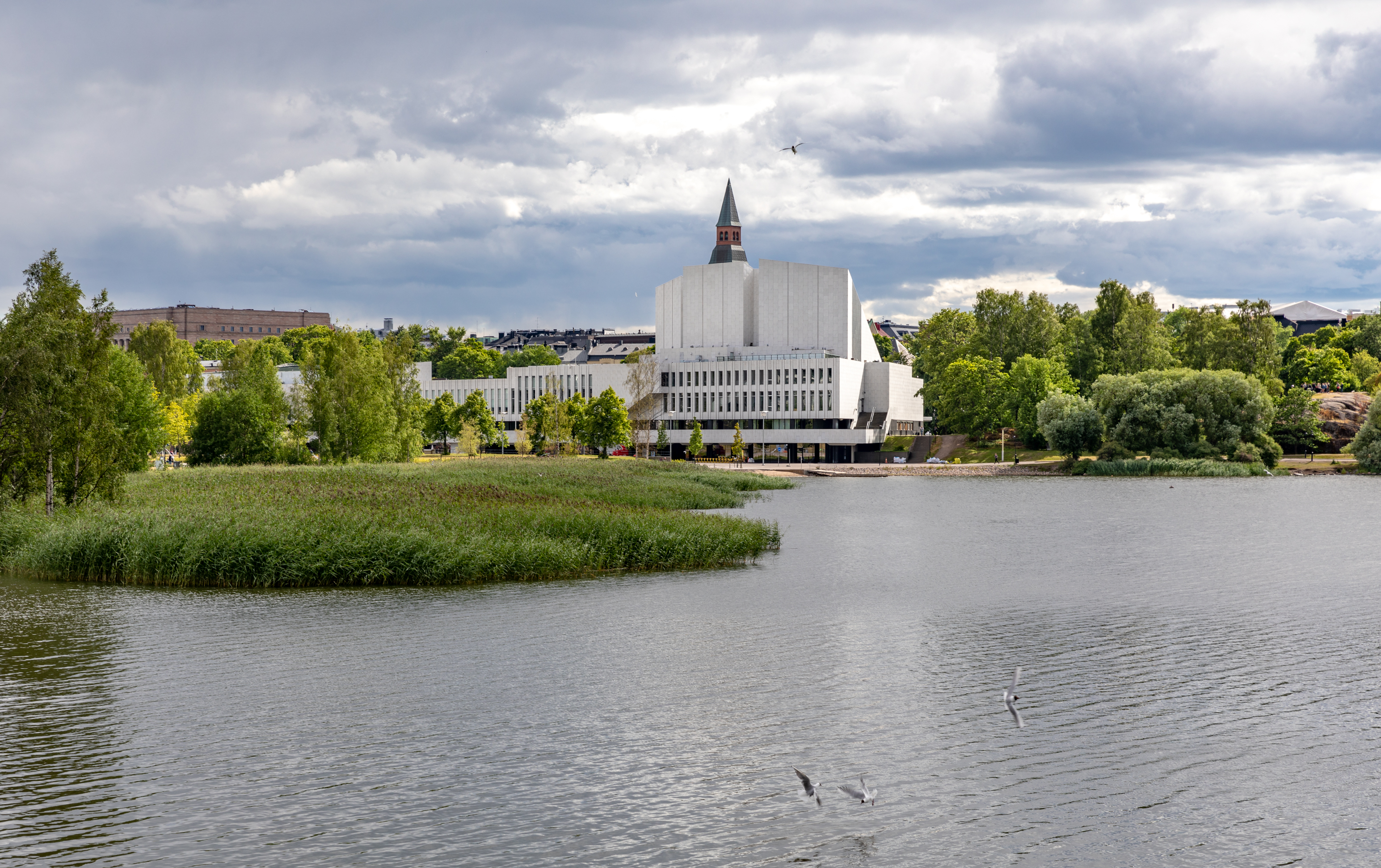
Alvar Aalto's Finlandia Hall hosted the Conference on Security and Co-operation in Europe in 1975.

The development of trade with the Western powers, such as the United Kingdom, and the payment of reparations to the Soviet Union led to Finland's transformation from a primarily agrarian society to an industrialized one. Valmet, originally a shipyard and then several metal workshops, was established to produce materials for war reparations. After the reparations were paid, Finland continued to trade with the Soviet Union as part of bilateral trade.

In 1950, 46% of Finnish workers were employed in agriculture and a third lived in urban areas, but new jobs in manufacturing, services and trade quickly attracted people to the cities. The average number of births per woman fell from a baby boom peak of 3.5 in 1947 to 1.5 in 1973. As the baby boomers entered the workforce, the economy failed to create jobs fast enough and hundreds of thousands emigrated to more industrialized Sweden, with emigration peaking in 1969 and 1970. Finland participated in trade liberalization in the World Bank, the International Monetary Fund and the General Agreement on Tariffs and Trade.

During the Cold War, Finland officially embraced a policy of neutrality. The YYA Treaty (Finno-Soviet Pact of Friendship, Cooperation and Mutual Assistance) recognized Finland's desire to remain outside great-power conflicts. From 1956 president Urho Kekkonen had a virtual monopoly on relations with the Soviet Union, which was crucial to his continued popularity. In politics, there was a tendency to avoid any policy or statement that could be interpreted as anti-Soviet. This phenomenon was dubbed "Finlandization" by the West German press.

A market economy was maintained in Finland. Various industries benefited from trade privileges with the Soviets. Economic growth was rapid in the post-war period, and by 1975 Finland's GDP per capita was the 15th highest in the world. During the 1970s and 1980s, Finland built one of the most extensive welfare states in the world. In 1973, Finland negotiated a treaty with the European Economic Community (EEC) that reduced tariffs, enhancing trade relations.

Miscalculated macroeconomic decisions, a banking crisis, the collapse of its largest trading partner, the Soviet Union, and a global economic downturn caused a deep recession in Finland in the early 1990s. The recession bottomed out in 1993 and Finland enjoyed more than a decade of steady economic growth. After the collapse of the Soviet Union, Finland began to integrate more closely with the West. Finland joined the European Union in 1995 and the euro zone in 1999. Much of the economic growth of the late 1990s was fuelled by the success of mobile phone manufacturer Nokia.

=== 21st century ===
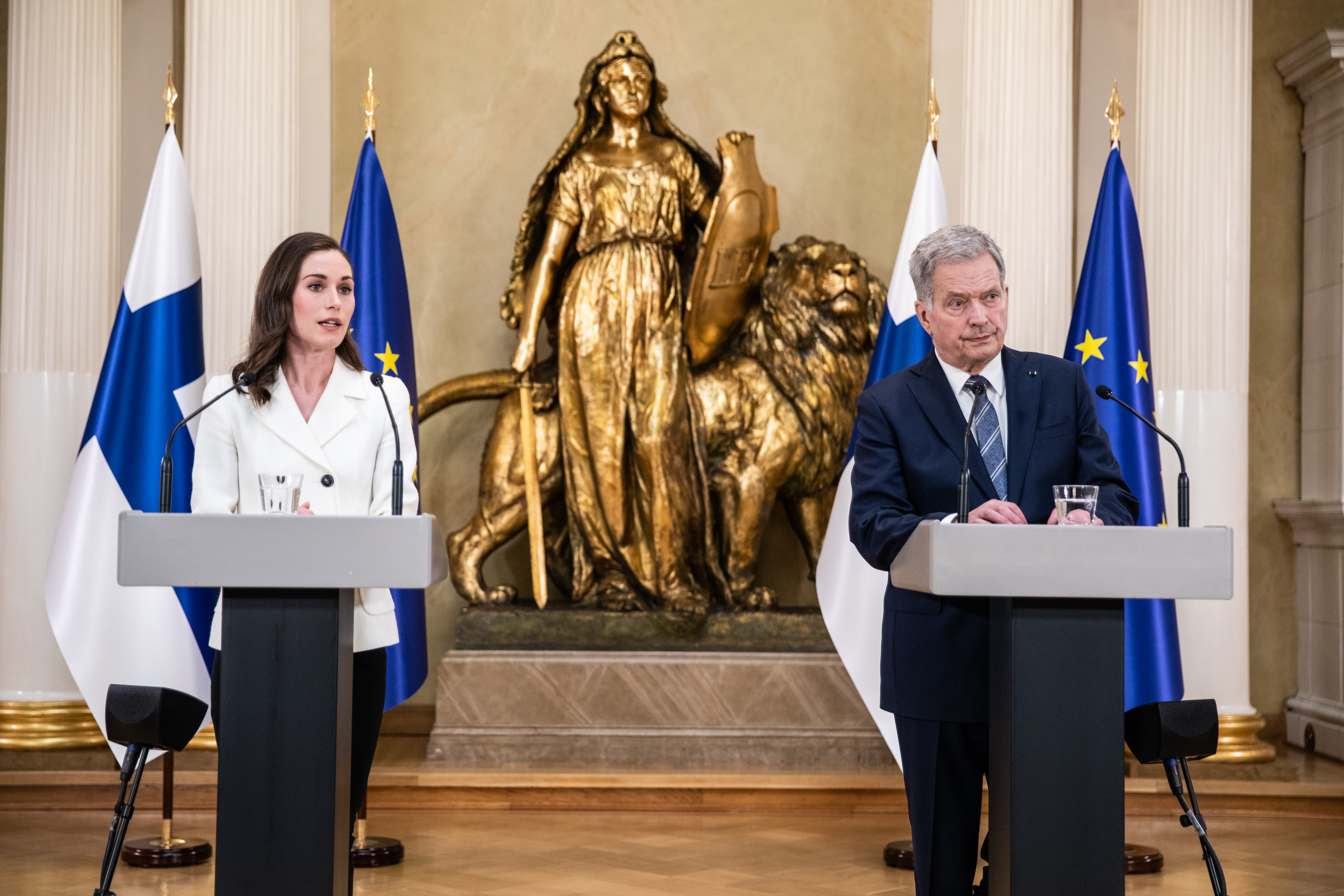
Prime Minister Sanna Marin and President Sauli Niinistö at the press conference announcing Finland's intent to apply to NATO on 2022

The Finnish people elected Tarja Halonen in the 2000 Presidential election, making her the first female President of Finland. Her predecessor, President Martti Ahtisaari, later won the Nobel Peace Prize in 2008. The 2008 financial crisis paralysed Finland's exports in 2008, leading to weaker economic growth throughout the decade. Sauli Niinistö was elected President of Finland from 2012 until 2024, when Alexander Stubb took over.

Finnish support for NATO rose sharply after the Russian invasion of Ukraine in 2022. Before February 2022, opinion polls showed a narrow but decisive majority against NATO membership; by April, a supermajority was in favour of membership. On 11 May 2022, Finland signed a mutual security pact with the United Kingdom. On 12 May, Finland's president and Prime Minister called for NATO membership "without delay". Subsequently, on 17 May, the Finnish Parliament voted 188–8 in favour of Finland's accession to NATO. Finland became a member of NATO on 4 April 2023.

== Geography ==
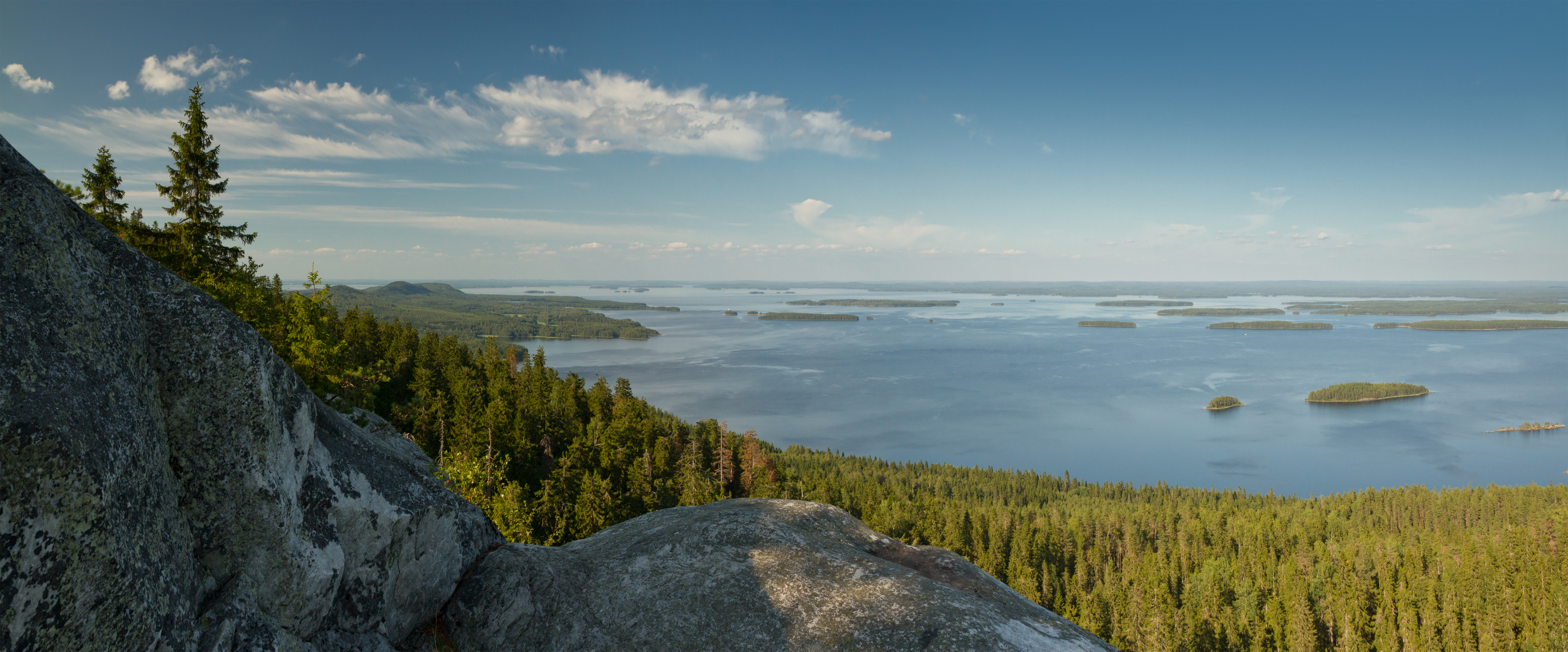
Finland is often referred as "the land of a thousand lakes". Picture of Lake Pielinen in North Karelia.

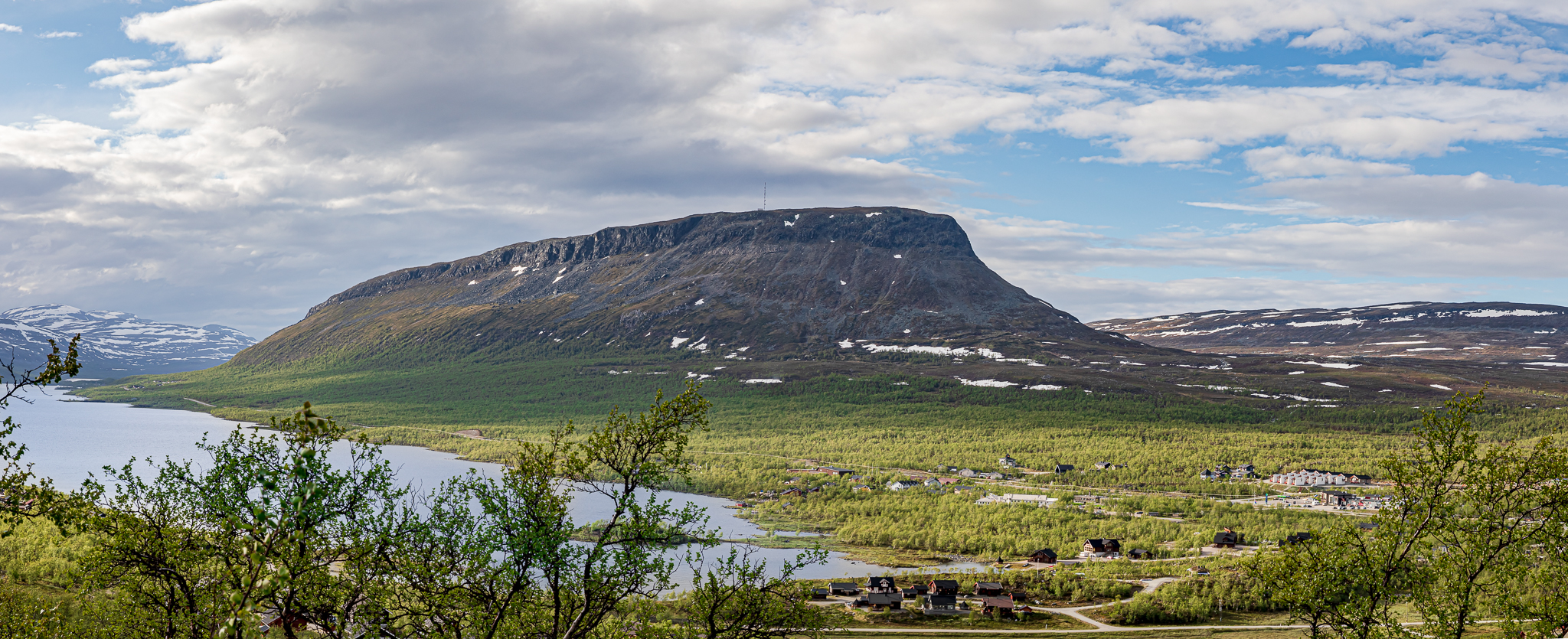
Saana fell in Kilpisjärvi, Finnish Lapland.

Lying approximately between latitudes 60° and 70° N, and longitudes 20° and 32° E, Finland is one of the world's northernmost countries. Of world capitals, only Reykjavík lies more to the north than Helsinki. The country is geographically stretched strongly in a north–south direction: the distance from the southernmost point – Hanko in Uusimaa – to the northernmost – Nuorgam in Lapland – is 1,160 kilometres (720 mi).

Finland has about 168,000 lakes (of area larger than 500 m^{2} or 0.12 acres) and 179,000 islands. Its largest lake, Saimaa, is the fourth largest in Europe. The Finnish Lakeland is the area with the most lakes in the country; many of the major cities in the area, most notably Tampere, Jyväskylä and Kuopio, are located near the large lakes. Lying off the coast of Finland is the world's largest archipelago, a formation consisting of more than 50,000 islands. The greatest concentration of these islands is found in the southwest in a part of the Baltic Sea called the Archipelago Sea, between continental Finland and the island of Åland.

Much of the geography of Finland is a result of the Ice Age. The glaciers were thicker and lasted longer in Fennoscandia compared with the rest of Europe. The eroding effects have contributed to a mostly flat landscape in Finland, characterized by hills. However, in the northern regions, including areas bordering the Scandinavian Mountains, the terrain features mountainous elevations. At 1,324 metres (4,344 ft), Halti is the highest point in Finland. It is found in the north of Lapland at the border between Finland and Norway. The highest mountain whose peak is entirely in Finland is Ridnitšohkka at 1,316 m (4,318 ft), directly adjacent to Halti.

The retreating glaciers have left the land with terminal moraine deposits. These are ridges of stratified gravel and sand, running northwest to southeast, where the ancient edge of the glacier once lay. Among the biggest of these are the three Salpausselkä ridges that run across southern Finland. Eskers are also found.

Having been compressed under the enormous weight of the glaciers, terrain in Finland is rising due to the post-glacial rebound. The effect is strongest around the Gulf of Bothnia, where land steadily rises about 1 cm (0.4 in) a year. As a result, the old sea bottom turns little by little into dry land: the surface area of the country is expanding by about 7 square kilometres (2.7 sq mi) annually. Relatively speaking, Finland is rising from the sea.

The landscape is covered mostly by coniferous taiga forests and fens, with little cultivated land. Of the total area, 10% is lakes, rivers, and ponds, and 78% is forest. The forest consists of pine, spruce, birch, and other species. Finland is the largest producer of wood in Europe and among the largest in the world. The most common type of rock is granite. It is a ubiquitous part of the scenery, visible wherever there is no soil cover. Moraine or till is the most common type of soil, covered by a thin layer of humus of biological origin. Podzol profile development is seen in most forest soils except where drainage is poor. Gleysols and peat bogs occupy poorly drained areas.

=== Biodiversity ===
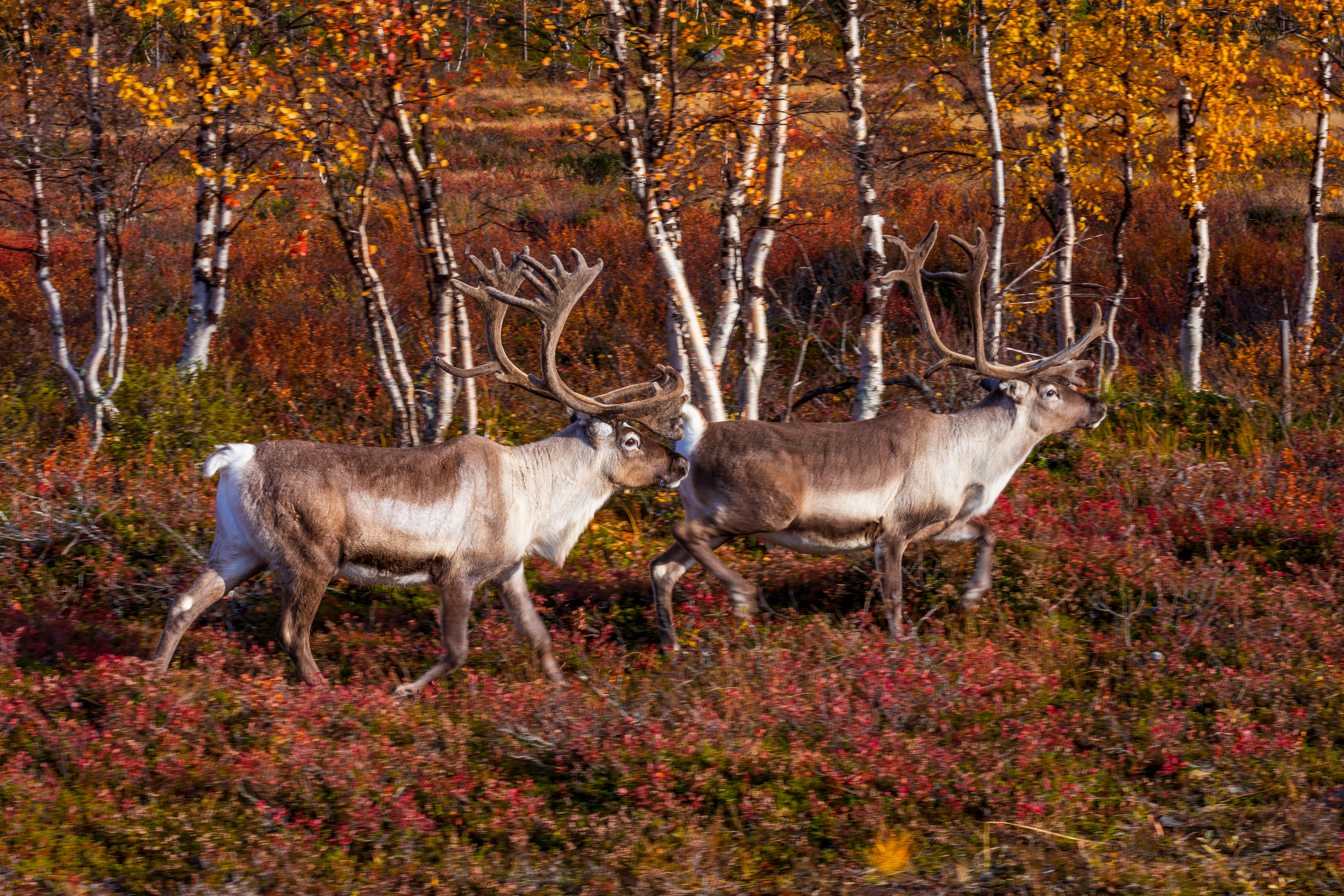
In Finland, reindeer graze in Lapland area and on the fells.

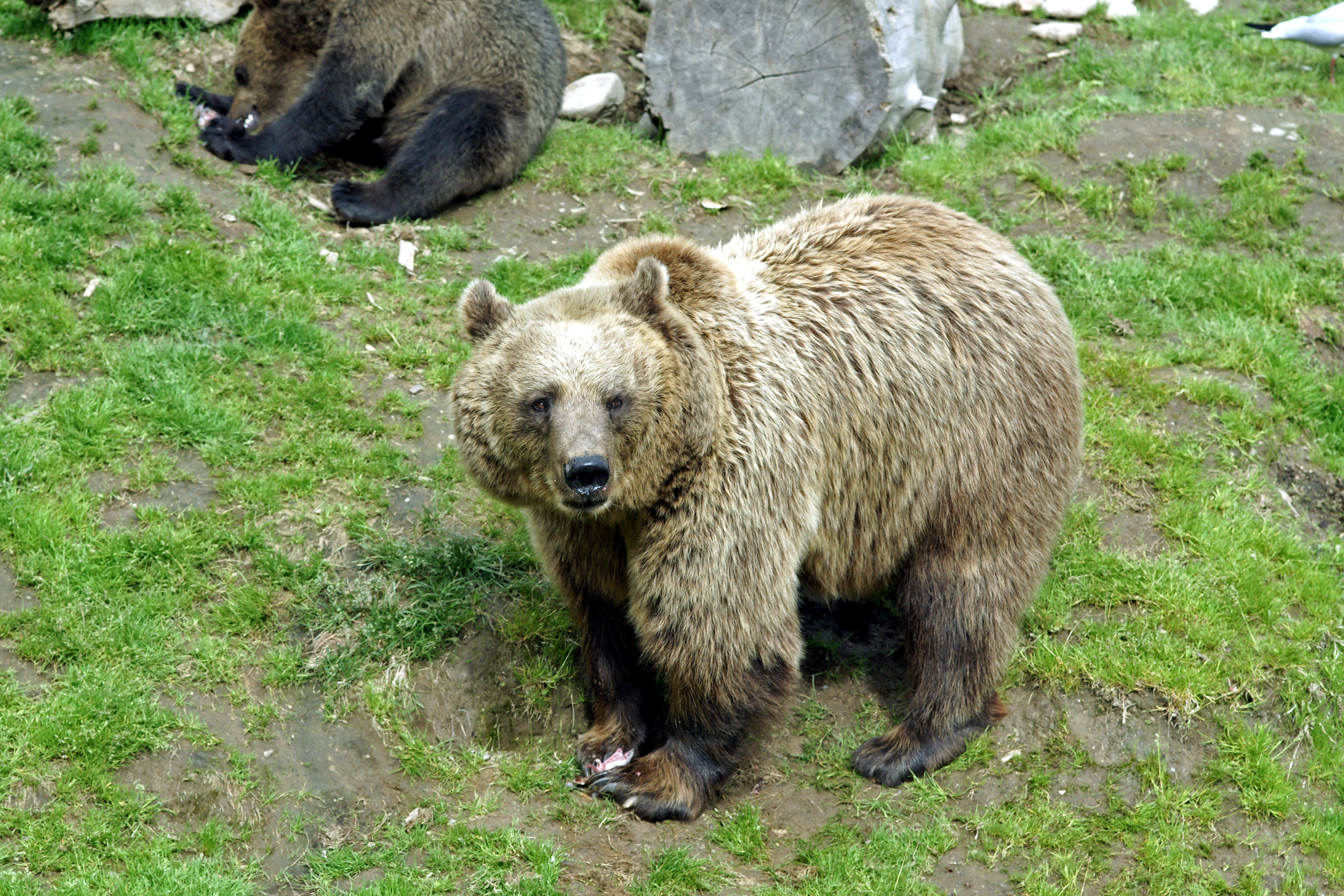
The brown bear is Finland's national animal. It is also the largest carnivore in Finland.

Phytogeographically, Finland is shared between the Arctic, central European, and northern European provinces of the Circumboreal Region within the Boreal Kingdom. According to the WWF, the territory of Finland can be subdivided into three ecoregions: the Scandinavian and Russian taiga, Sarmatic mixed forests, and Scandinavian Montane Birch forest and grasslands. Taiga covers most of Finland from northern regions of southern provinces to the north of Lapland. On the southwestern coast, south of the Helsinki-Rauma line, forests are characterized by mixed forests, that are more typical in the Baltic region. In the extreme north of Finland, near the tree line and Arctic Ocean, Montane Birch forests are common. Finland had a 2018 Forest Landscape Integrity Index mean score of 5.08/10, ranking it 109th globally out of 172 countries.

Similarly, Finland has a diverse and extensive range of fauna. There are at least sixty native mammalian species, 248 breeding bird species, over 70 fish species, and 11 reptile and frog species present today, many migrating from neighbouring countries thousands of years ago. Large and widely recognized wildlife mammals found in Finland are the brown bear, grey wolf, wolverine, Eurasian lynx, European roe deer, reindeer and elk. Three of the more striking birds are the whooper swan, a large European swan and the national bird of Finland; the Western capercaillie, a large, black-plumaged member of the grouse family; and the Eurasian eagle-owl. The latter is considered an indicator of old-growth forest connectivity, and has been declining because of landscape fragmentation. Around 24,000 species of insects are prevalent in Finland some of the most common being hornets with tribes of beetles such as the Onciderini also being common. The most common breeding birds are the willow warbler, common chaffinch, and redwing. Of some seventy species of freshwater fish, the northern pike, perch, and others are plentiful. Atlantic salmon remains the favourite of fly rod enthusiasts.

The endangered Saimaa ringed seal, one of only three lake seal species in the world, exists only in the Saimaa lake system of southeastern Finland, down to only 390 seals today. The species has become the emblem of the Finnish Association for Nature Conservation.

A third of Finland's land area originally consisted of moorland, about half of this area has been drained for cultivation over the past centuries.

=== Climate ===
Köppen climate classification types of Finland

The main factor influencing Finland's climate is the country's geographical position between the 60th and 70th northern parallels in the Eurasian continent's coastal zone. In the Köppen climate classification, the largest part of Finland lies in the boreal zone, characterized by warm summers and freezing winters. Within the country, the temperateness varies considerably between the southern coastal regions and the extreme north, showing characteristics of both a maritime and a continental climate. Finland is near enough to the Atlantic Ocean to be continuously warmed by the Gulf Stream. The Gulf Stream combines with the moderating effects of the Baltic Sea and numerous inland lakes to explain the unusually warm climate compared with other regions that share the same latitude, such as Alaska, Siberia, and southern Greenland.

Share of forest area in total land area, top countries (2021). Finland has the tenth highest percentage of forest cover in the world.

Winters in southern Finland (when the mean daily temperature remains below 0 °C or 32 °F) are usually about 100 days long, and in the inland the snow typically covers the land from about late November to April, and on the coastal areas such as Helsinki, snow often covers the land from late December to late March. Even in the south, the harshest winter nights can see the temperatures fall to −30 °C (−22 °F), although on coastal areas like Helsinki, temperatures below −30 °C (−22 °F) are rare. Climatic summers (when mean daily temperature remains above 10 °C or 50 °F) in southern Finland last from about late May to mid-September, and in the inland, the warmest days of July can reach over 35 °C (95 °F). Although most of Finland lies on the taiga belt, the southernmost coastal regions are sometimes classified as hemiboreal.

In northern Finland, particularly in Lapland, the winters are long and cold, while the summers are relatively warm but short. On the most severe winter days in Lapland can see the temperature fall to −45 °C (−49 °F). The winter of the north lasts for about 200 days with permanent snow cover from about mid-October to early May. Summers in the north are quite short, only two to three months, but can still see maximum daily temperatures above 25 °C (77 °F) during heat waves. No part of Finland has Arctic tundra, but Alpine tundra can be found at the fells Lapland.

The Finnish climate is suitable for cereal farming only in the southernmost regions, while the northern regions are suitable for animal husbandry.

A quarter of Finland's territory lies within the Arctic Circle and the midnight sun can be experienced for more days the farther north one travels. At Finland's northernmost point, the sun does not set for 73 consecutive days during summer and does not rise at all for 51 days during winter.

Finland is ranked 4th in Environmental Performance Index for year 2024. This Index combines various indicators around known issues around the world and measures how good they fit in among each countries on a scale. Finland scores good in parameters like Climate Change Mitigation, Waste Management, Air pollution, Air quality etc.

== Government and politics ==
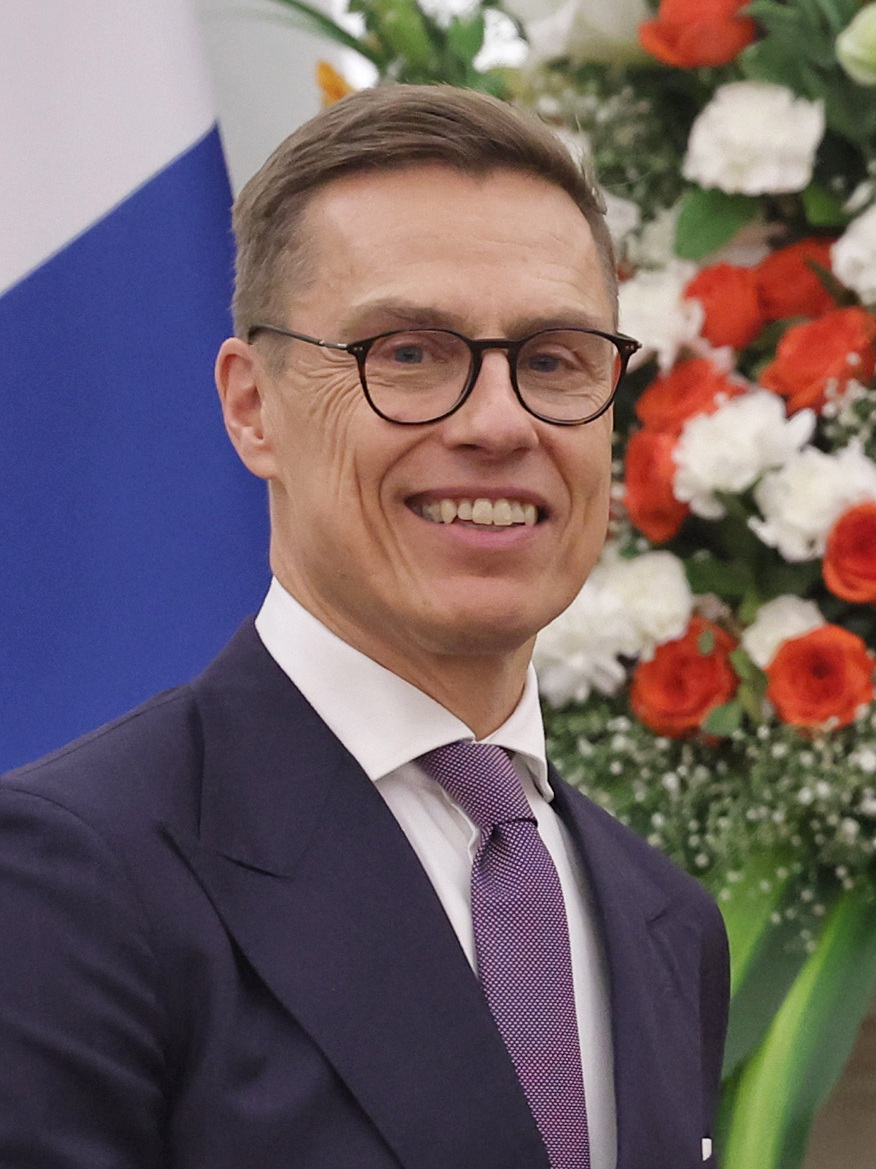
Alexander Stubb
President

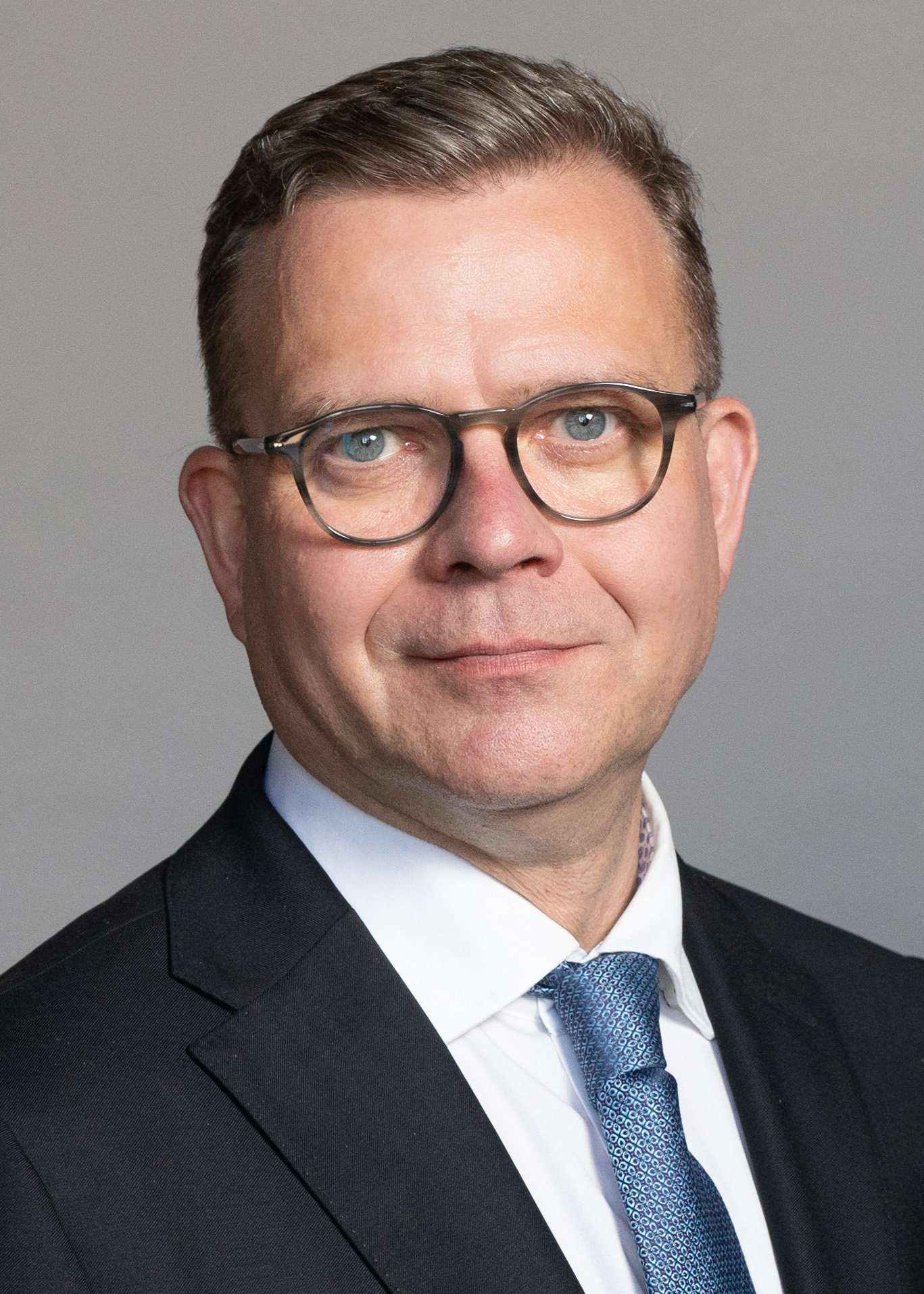
Petteri Orpo
Prime Minister

Modern Finnish values are rooted in egalitarian ideals. The country maintains a Nordic welfare model with significant state intervention in critical economic sectors. Robust LGBT rights, strong efforts to eliminate poverty, broad protections for women's rights, secularism, and environmentalism are indicators of its political and cultural values. According to International IDEA's Global State of Democracy (GSoD) Indices and Democracy Tracker, Finland performs in the high range on overall democratic measures, with particular strengths in political participation, including inclusive freedom of movement, freedom of movement and elected government.

Finland is a member of: the Eurozone the European Union

=== Constitution ===
The Constitution of Finland defines the political system; Finland is a parliamentary republic within the framework of a representative democracy. The Prime Minister is the country's most powerful person. Citizens can run and vote in parliamentary, municipal, presidential, and European Union elections.

=== President ===
Finland's head of state is the President of the Republic. Finland had, for most of its independence a semi-presidential system of government, but in the last few decades the powers of the president have become more circumscribed, and consequently the country is now considered a parliamentary republic. A new constitution, enacted in 2000, made the presidency primarily a ceremonial office. The president appoints the prime minister as elected by Parliament, appoints and dismisses the other ministers of the Finnish Government on the recommendation of the prime minister, opens parliamentary sessions, and confers state honors. Nevertheless, the president remains responsible for Finland's foreign relations, including the making of war and peace, but excluding matters related to the European Union. Moreover, the president exercises supreme command over the Finnish Defence Forces as commander-in-chief. In the exercise of his or her foreign and defense powers, the president is required to consult the Finnish government, but the government's advice is not binding. In addition, the president has several domestic reserve powers, including the authority to veto legislation, to grant pardons, and to appoint several public officials. The president is also required by the Constitution to dismiss individual ministers or the entire government upon a parliamentary vote of no confidence.

The president is directly elected via runoff voting and may serve for a maximum of two consecutive 6-year terms. The current president is Alexander Stubb, who took office on 1 March 2024. His predecessors were Kaarlo Juho Ståhlberg (1919–1925), Lauri Kristian Relander (1925–1931), Pehr Evind Svinhufvud (1931–1937), Kyösti Kallio (1937–1940), Risto Ryti (1940–1944), Carl Gustaf Emil Mannerheim (1944–1946), Juho Kusti Paasikivi (1946–1956), Urho Kekkonen (1956–1982), Mauno Koivisto (1982–1994), Martti Ahtisaari (1994–2000), Tarja Halonen (2000–2012), and Sauli Niinistö (2012–2024).

=== Parliament ===
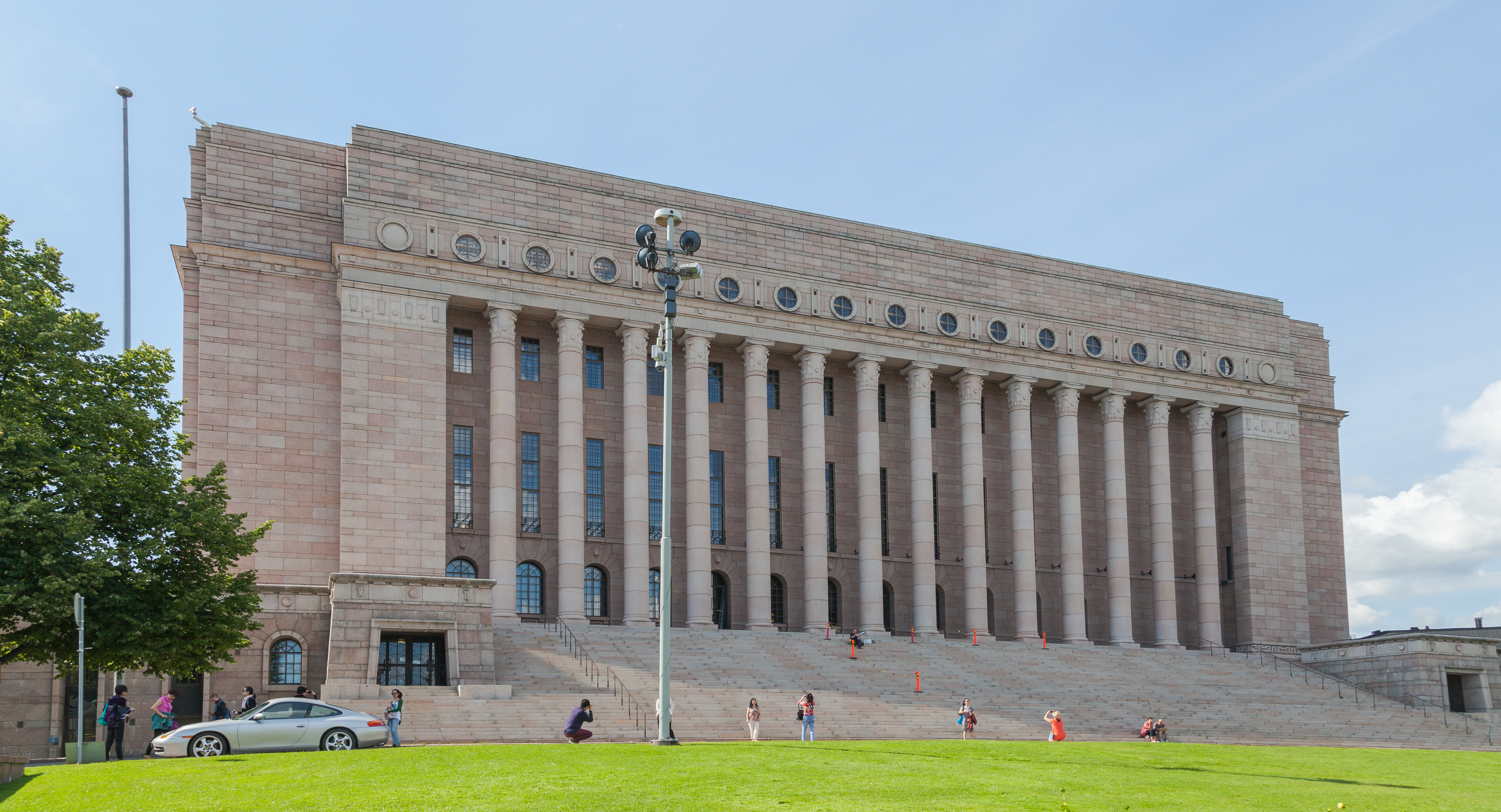
The Parliament of Finland's main building in Helsinki

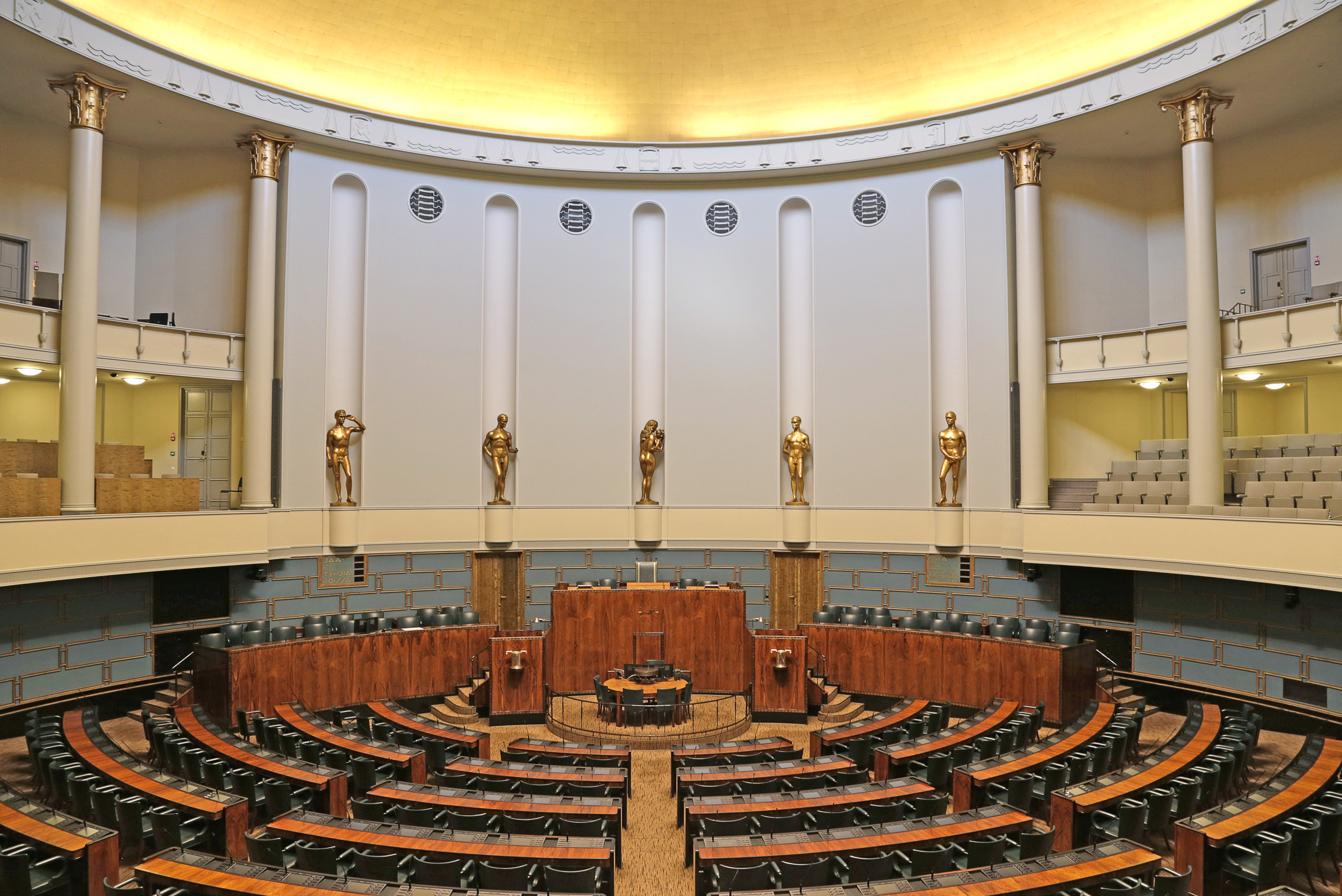
The Session Hall of the Parliament of Finland

The 200-member unicameral Parliament of Finland (Finnish: Eduskunta) exercises supreme legislative authority in the country. It may alter the constitution and ordinary laws, dismiss the cabinet, and override presidential vetoes. Its acts are not subject to judicial review; the constitutionality of new laws is assessed by the parliament's constitutional law committee. The parliament is elected for a term of four years using the proportional D'Hondt method within several multi-seat constituencies through the most open list multi-member districts. Various parliament committees listen to experts and prepare legislation.

Significant parliamentary parties are Centre Party, Christian Democrats, Finns Party, Green League, Left Alliance, National Coalition Party, Social Democrats and Swedish People's Party.

=== Cabinet ===
After parliamentary elections, the parties negotiate among themselves on forming a new cabinet (the Finnish Government), which then has to be approved by a simple majority vote in the parliament. The cabinet can be dismissed by a parliamentary vote of no confidence, although this rarely happens, as the parties represented in the cabinet usually make up a majority in the parliament.

The cabinet exercises most executive powers and originates most of the bills that the parliament then debates and votes on. It is headed by the Prime Minister of Finland, and consists of him or her, other ministers, and the Chancellor of Justice. Each minister heads his or her ministry, or, in some cases, has responsibility for a subset of a ministry's policy. After the prime minister, the most powerful minister is often the minister of finance.

As no one party ever dominates the parliament, Finnish cabinets are multi-party coalitions. As a rule, the post of prime minister goes to the leader of the biggest party and that of the minister of finance to the leader of the second biggest.

The Orpo Cabinet is the incumbent 77th government of Finland. It took office on 20 June 2023. The cabinet is headed by Petteri Orpo and is a coalition between the National Coalition Party, Finns Party, the Swedish People's Party, and the Christian Democrats.

=== Administrative divisions ===
Municipalities (thin borders) and regions (thick borders) of Finland (2021)

The local administrative divisions of the country are the municipalities (kunta, kommun), which may also call themselves cities (kaupunki, stad). As of 2021, there are 309 municipalities. Most are small with median number of 6,000 residents. The highest decision-making authority is the municipal council, whose members are elected for a four-year term. The municipal elections, which are based on a partisan list, provide a democratic counterbalance for the political composition of the parliament. The municipalities account for half of the public spending, financed by municipal income tax, state subsidies, and other revenue. The main duties of the municipalities include education and child care services; cultural, youth, library and sports services; urban planning and land use; water and waste management and environmental services.

The 2023 reform transformed the administrative system from a two-tier structure (central government and municipal level) into a three-tier system. The 21 wellbeing services counties occupy the middle level as regional democratic self-governing entities. They are responsible for organising health, social welfare and emergency services. Wellbeing services counties do not have the right to levy taxes and their funding is based on central government funding. The City of Helsinki and the region of Åland remain outside the wellbeing services county structure.

The municipalities in mainland Finland are grouped into 18 regions (maakunta, landskap). The regions are governed by regional councils, which serve as forums of cooperation for the municipalities. They are responsible for regional development and regional land-use planning, and the coordination of EU structural funds. The autonomous province of Åland forms its own region, with a democratically elected regional parliament (lagting).

The central government has a regional presence through which its ministries and central agencies operate. These agencies are distinct from the self-governing regional level. Since the beginning of 2026, the regional state administration has been organized into ten Economic Development Centres (Elinvoimakeskus). The jurisdiction of each Economic Development Centre covers one or more regions. The centres have a broad range of responsibilities, including business and industry, employment, immigration and integration, road maintenance, and biodiversity promotion.

Sámi people have a semi-autonomous Sámi native region in Lapland for issues on language and culture.

Regional map	English name	Finnish name	Swedish name	Capital	Regional state administrative agency
	Uusimaa	Uusimaa	Nyland	Helsinki	Southern Finland
	South Karelia	Etelä-Karjala	Södra Karelen	Lappeenranta	Southern Finland
	Päijät-Häme	Päijät-Häme	Päijänne-Tavastland	Lahti	Southern Finland
	Kanta-Häme	Kanta-Häme	Egentliga Tavastland	Hämeenlinna	Southern Finland
	Kymenlaakso	Kymenlaakso	Kymmenedalen	Kotka and Kouvola	Southern Finland
	Satakunta	Satakunta	Satakunta	Pori	South-Western Finland
	Southwest Finland	Varsinais-Suomi	Egentliga Finland	Turku	South-Western Finland
	North Karelia	Pohjois-Karjala	Norra Karelen	Joensuu	Eastern Finland
	North Savo	Pohjois-Savo	Norra Savolax	Kuopio	Eastern Finland
	South Savo	Etelä-Savo	Södra Savolax	Mikkeli	Eastern Finland
	South Ostrobothnia	Etelä-Pohjanmaa	Södra Österbotten	Seinäjoki	Western and Central Finland
	Central Ostrobothnia	Keski-Pohjanmaa	Mellersta Österbotten	Kokkola	Western and Central Finland
	Ostrobothnia	Pohjanmaa	Österbotten	Vaasa	Western and Central Finland
	Pirkanmaa	Pirkanmaa	Birkaland	Tampere	Western and Central Finland
	Central Finland	Keski-Suomi	Mellersta Finland	Jyväskylä	Western and Central Finland
	North Ostrobothnia	Pohjois-Pohjanmaa	Norra Österbotten	Oulu	Northern Finland
	Kainuu	Kainuu	Kajanaland	Kajaani	Northern Finland
	Lapland	Lappi	Lappland	Rovaniemi	Lapland
	Åland (Note: The role that the regional councils serve on Mainland Finland are on Åland handled by the autonomous Government of Åland.)	Ahvenanmaa	Åland	Mariehamn	Åland

=== Law ===
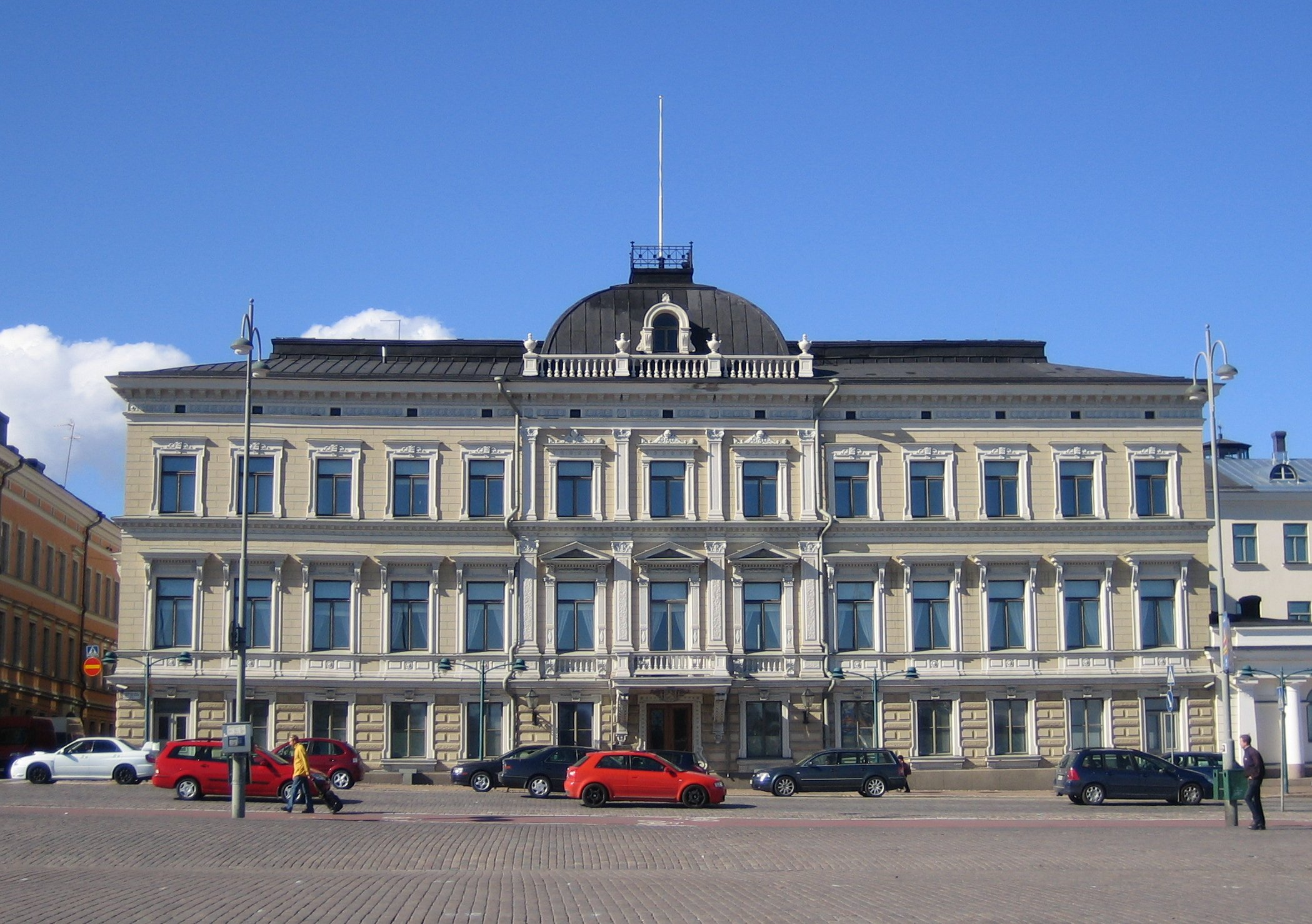
The Court House of the Supreme Court

The judicial system of Finland is a civil law system divided between courts with regular civil and criminal jurisdiction and administrative courts with jurisdiction over litigation between individuals and the public administration. Finnish law is codified and based on Swedish law and in a wider sense, civil law or Roman law. The court system for civil and criminal jurisdiction consists of local courts, regional appellate courts, and the Supreme Court. The administrative branch of justice consists of administrative courts and the Supreme Administrative Court. In addition to the regular courts, there are a few special courts in certain branches of administration. There is also a High Court of Impeachment for criminal charges against certain high-ranking officeholders.

Around 92% of residents have confidence in Finland's security institutions. The overall crime rate of Finland is not high in the EU context. Some crime types are above average, notably the high homicide rate for Western Europe. A day fine system is in effect and also applied to offenses such as speeding. Finland has a very low number of corruption charges; Transparency International ranks Finland as one of the least corrupt countries in Europe.

=== Foreign relations ===
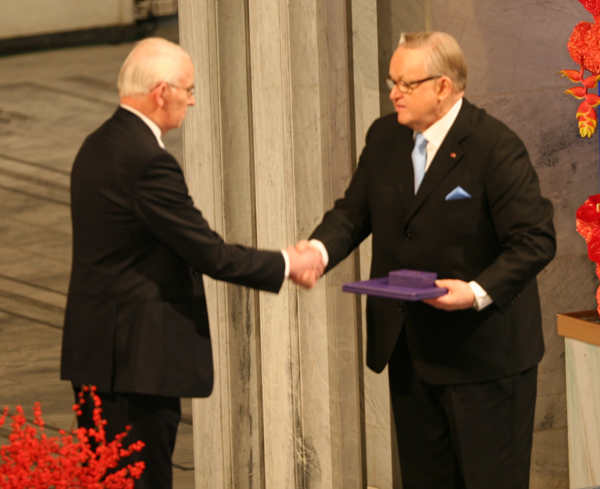
Martti Ahtisaari receiving the Nobel Peace Prize in 2008

Finland's middle power status includes a strong economy, international cooperation, and commitment to human rights. According to the 2012 constitution, the president leads foreign policy in cooperation with the government, except that the president has no role in EU affairs. In 2008, president Martti Ahtisaari was awarded the Nobel Peace Prize.

Finland's relationship with Russia deteriorated following the 2022 Russian invasion of Ukraine, with a number of Russian diplomats expelled for spying, Russians restricted from visiting Finland and the general opinion immediately changing for Finland to join NATO, while it has also had a significant impact on the increasing strength of relations between the United States and Finland. According to the 2024 Global Peace Index, Finland is the 13th most peaceful country in the world.

=== Military ===
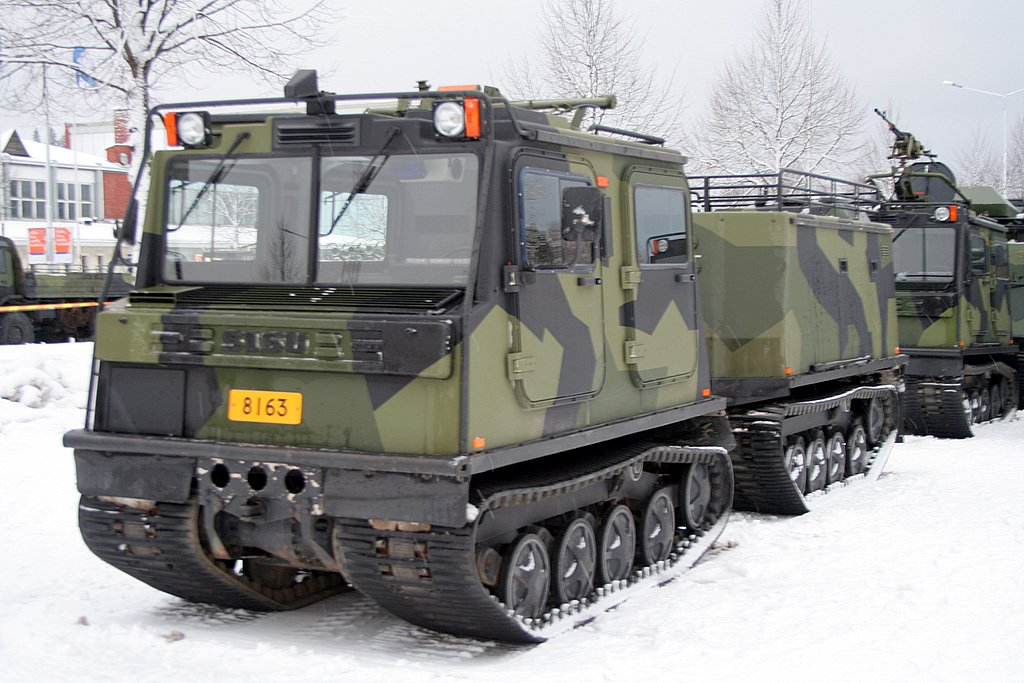
Sisu Nasu NA-110 tracked transport vehicle of the Finnish Army. Most conscripts receive training for warfare in winter, and transport vehicles such as this give mobility in heavy snow.

The Finnish Defence Forces consists of an army, navy, and air force. The border guard, while under the Ministry of the Interior, can be incorporated into the Defence Forces during wartime. Finland maintains universal male conscription, under which all male Finnish nationals above 18 years of age serve for 6 to 12 months of armed service or 12 months of civilian (non-armed) service. The Finnish military comprises a cadre of professional soldiers (mainly officers and technical personnel), conscripts, and a large number of reservists. The standard readiness strength is 34,700 people in uniform, of which 25% are professional soldiers; the entire reserve comprises approximately 900,000 people. Voluntary post-conscription overseas peacekeeping service is popular, and troops serve around the world in UN, NATO, and EU missions. Women are allowed to serve in all combat arms; in 2022, 1,211 women entered voluntary military service.

Finnish defence expenditure per capita is one of the highest in the European Union. With a high capability of military personnel, arsenal and homeland defence willingness, Finland is one of Europe's militarily strongest countries. The NATO organization will site a command unit at Riihimäki in 2027.

Finland became a member of NATO on 4 April 2023, though it had previously participated in the NATO Response Force. Finland is actively involved in multilateral military operations, including the Joint Expeditionary Force (JEF), the EU Battlegroup, and the Kosovo Force; it also contributed to the International Security Assistance Force in Afghanistan. On 18 December 2023, Finland signed the Defense Cooperation Agreement (DCA) with the United States, which regulates the presence of the U.S. armed forces and their dependents on Finnish territory and the presence and activities of U.S. defence suppliers.

=== Human rights ===
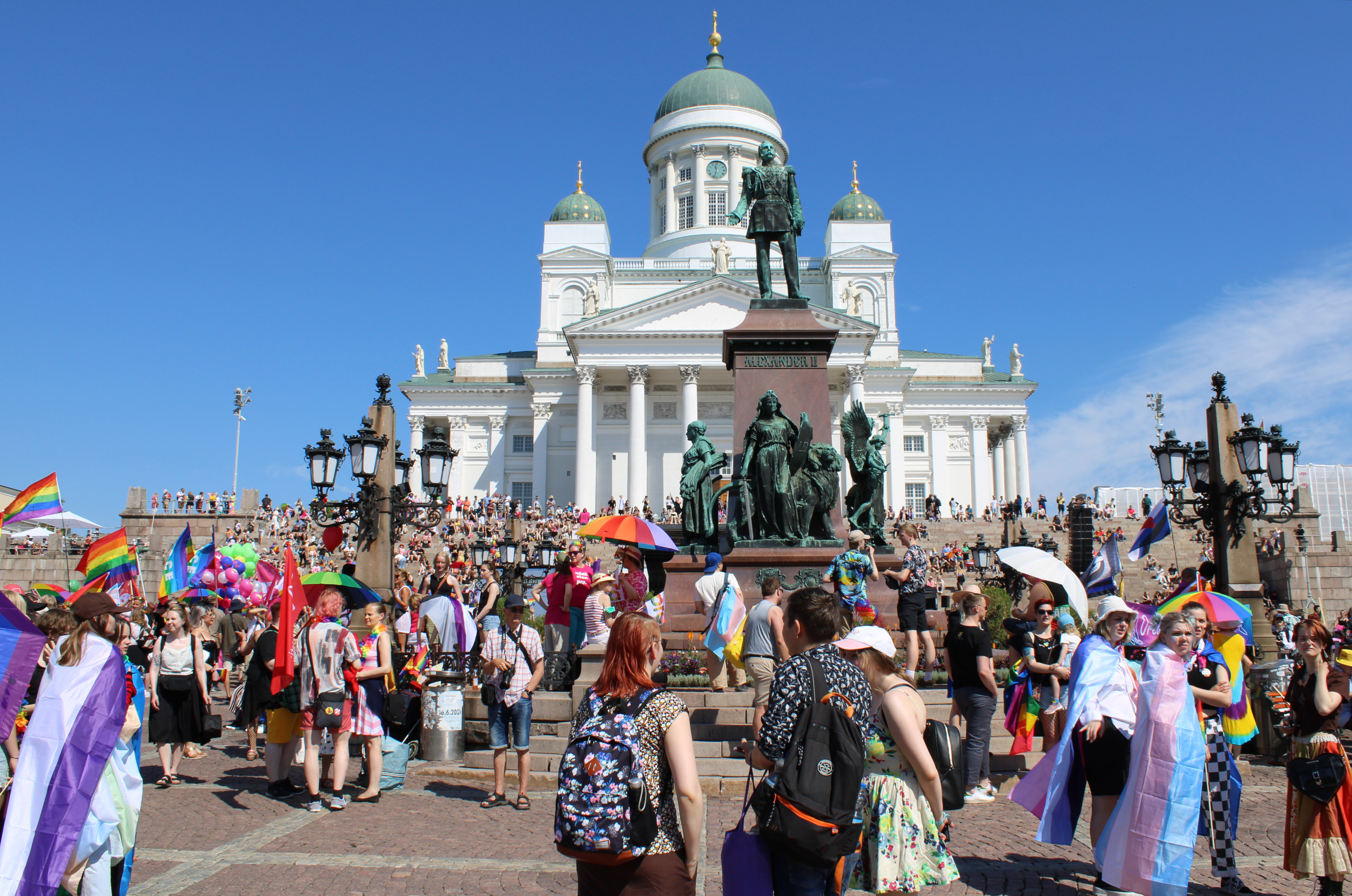
People gathering at the Senate Square, Helsinki, before the 2022 Helsinki Pride parade started

Finland has one of the world's most extensive welfare systems, one that guarantees decent living conditions for all residents. The welfare system was created almost entirely during the first three decades after World War II.

Section 6 of the Finnish Constitution states: "No one shall be placed in a different position on situation of sex, age, origin, language, religion, belief, opinion, state of health, disability or any other personal reason without an acceptable reason".

Finland has been ranked above average among the world's countries in democracy, press freedom, and human development. Amnesty International has expressed concern regarding some issues in Finland, such as the imprisonment of conscientious objectors, and societal discrimination against Romani people and members of other ethnic and linguistic minorities.

In the report of the European umbrella organization ILGA-Europe published in May 2023, Finland ranked sixth in a European comparison of LGBTQ+ rights.

== Economy ==
As of 2022, Finland ranked 16th globally in nominal GDP per capita according to the IMF. Additionally, Finland boasts a well-developed welfare system that encompasses free education and universal healthcare, contributing to its reputation as a wealthy nation.

In 2018, the service sector constituted the largest segment of the economy, amounting to 66% of the GDP, while manufacturing and refining made up 31%. Primary production accounted for 2.9% of the economy. Manufacturing is the primary economic sector concerning foreign trade. The predominant industrial sectors in 2007 were electronics (22%), machinery, vehicles, and other engineered metal products (21.1%), forest industry (13%), and chemicals (11%). The gross domestic product reached its peak in 2021. Finland ranked seventh in the Global Innovation Index in 2025, but dropped to eighth position in 2026.

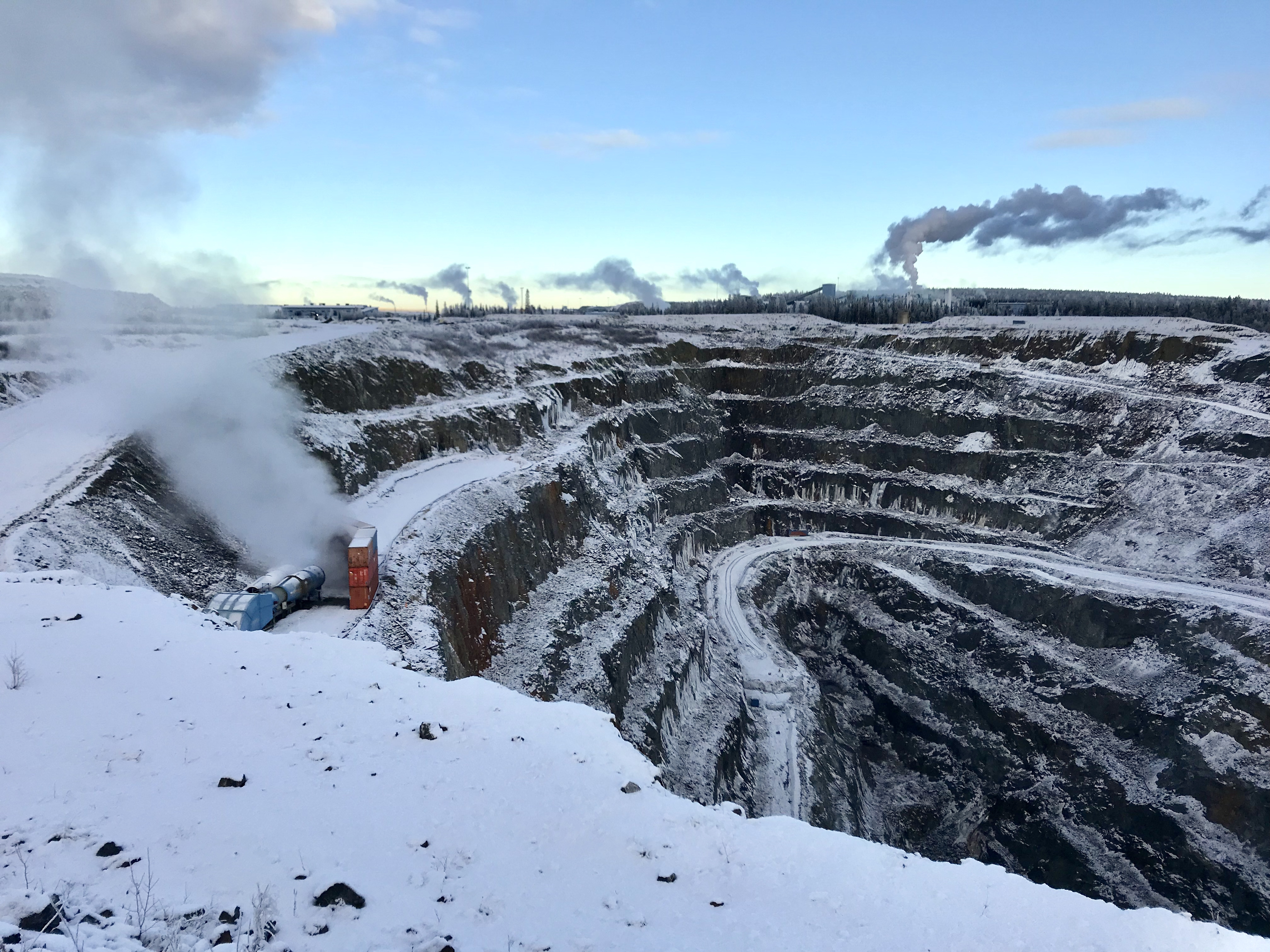
Kittilä Gold Mine, in Kittilä, Finnish Lapland, is the largest primary gold producer in Europe.

Finland has considerable timber, mineral (including iron, chromium, copper, nickel, and gold) and freshwater resources. Finland's gold production in 2015 was 9 metric tons. For the rural population, forestry, paper mills and agriculture are important. The Helsinki metropolitan area accounts for roughly one-third of Finland's GDP. Private services represent the largest employer in Finland.

Finland's soil and climate pose particular challenges for crop production, with harsh winters and relatively short growing seasons, often interrupted by frost. However, the prevalence of the Gulf Stream and the North Atlantic Drift Current in Finland's temperate climate allows for half of the world's arable land north of the 60° north latitude. Although annual precipitation is generally adequate, it mostly transpires during winter, which poses a continuous risk of summer droughts. Farmers have adapted to the climate by relying on quick-ripening and frost-resistant crop varieties. They cultivate south-facing slopes and rich bottomlands to ensure year-round production, even during summer frosts. Drainage systems are often utilized to remove excess water. Finland's agricultural sector has demonstrated remarkable efficiency and productivity, particularly in comparison to its European counterparts.

Forests are crucial to the nation's economy, making it one of the world's foremost wood producers and offering raw materials at competitive prices to the wood processing industries. The government has played an important role in forestry for a considerable period similar to that in agriculture. It has regulated tree cutting, sponsored technical improvements, and established long-term plans to guarantee the sustainability of the country's forests in supplying the wood-processing industries.

As of 2008, the average level of income, adjusted for purchasing power, was comparable to that of Italy, Sweden, Germany and France. In 2006, 62% of the labour force was employed by firms with fewer than 250 workers, which generated 49% of total business revenue. The employment rate of women is high. Gender segregation between male-dominated professions and female-dominated professions is higher than in the US. The proportion of part-time workers was one of the lowest in OECD in 1999. As of 2013, the 10 largest private sector employers in Finland were Itella, Nokia, OP-Pohjola, ISS, VR, Kesko, UPM-Kymmene, YIT, Metso, and Nordea. Finland has had the highest unemployment rate in the EU since November 2025. As of September 2026, the unemployment rate was 10.5%.

As of 2024, 47% of households consisted of a single person, 32% two persons and 21% three or more persons. The average residential space was 40 square metres (430 sq ft) per person. In 2023, Finland's GDP reached €273 billion. In 2022, altogether 74 per cent of employed persons worked in services and administration, 21 per cent in industry and construction, and four per cent in agriculture and forestry.

In 2018, Finland had the highest concentration of cooperatives relative to its population. The largest retailer, which is also the largest private employer, S-Group, and the largest bank, OP Financial Group, in Finland are both cooperatives.

=== Energy ===
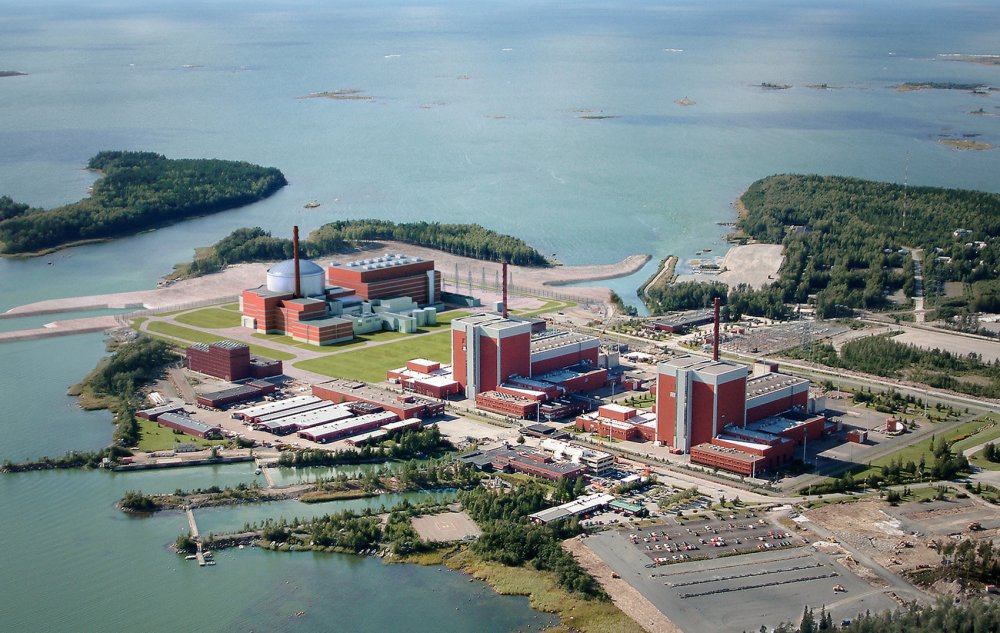
The Olkiluoto Nuclear Power Plant. Finland has five commercial nuclear reactors.

The free and largely privately owned financial and physical Nordic energy markets traded in NASDAQ OMX Commodities Europe and Nord Pool Spot exchanges, have provided competitive prices compared with other EU countries. As of 2022, Finland has the lowest non-household electricity prices in the EU.

In 2021, the energy market was around 87 terawatt hours and the peak demand around 14 gigawatts in winter. Industry and construction consumed 43.5% of total consumption, a relatively high figure reflecting Finland's industries. Finland's hydrocarbon resources are limited to peat and wood. About 18% of the electricity is produced by hydropower In 2021, renewable energy (mainly hydropower and various forms of wood energy) was high at 43% compared with the EU average of 22% in final energy consumption. About 20% of electricity is imported, especially from Sweden due to its lower cost there. As of February 2022, Finland's strategic petroleum reserves held 200 days worth of net oil imports in the case of emergencies.

Finland has five privately owned nuclear reactors producing 40% of the country's energy.

There are three reactors at the Olkiluoto Nuclear Power Plant and two old Soviet-designed VVER-440 at the Loviisa Nuclear Power Plant.

The Onkalo spent nuclear fuel repository is under construction at the Olkiluoto Nuclear Power Plant in the municipality of Eurajoki, on the west coast of Finland, by the company Posiva.

=== Transport ===
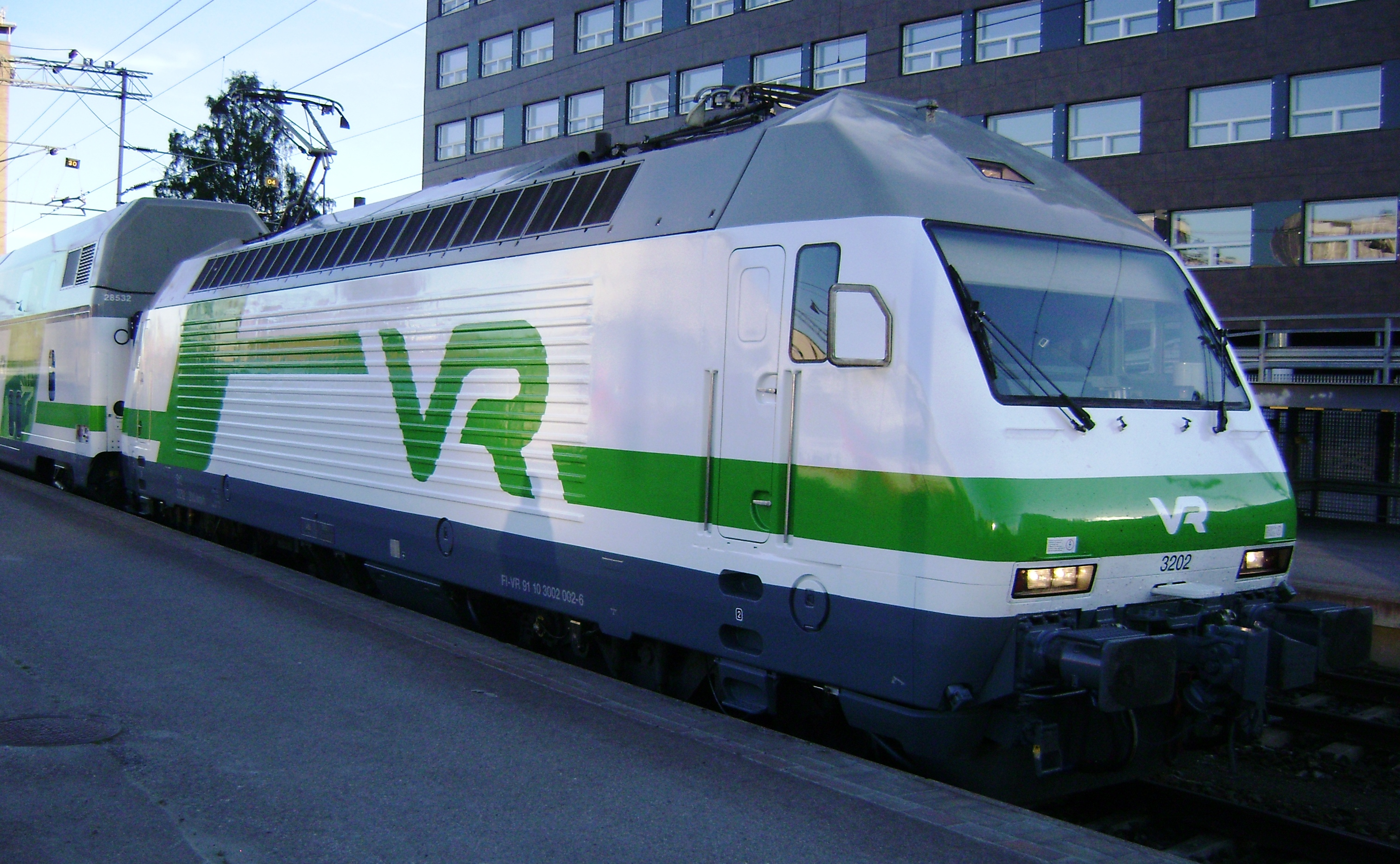
A VR Class Sr2 locomotive. The state-owned VR operates a railway network serving all major cities in Finland.

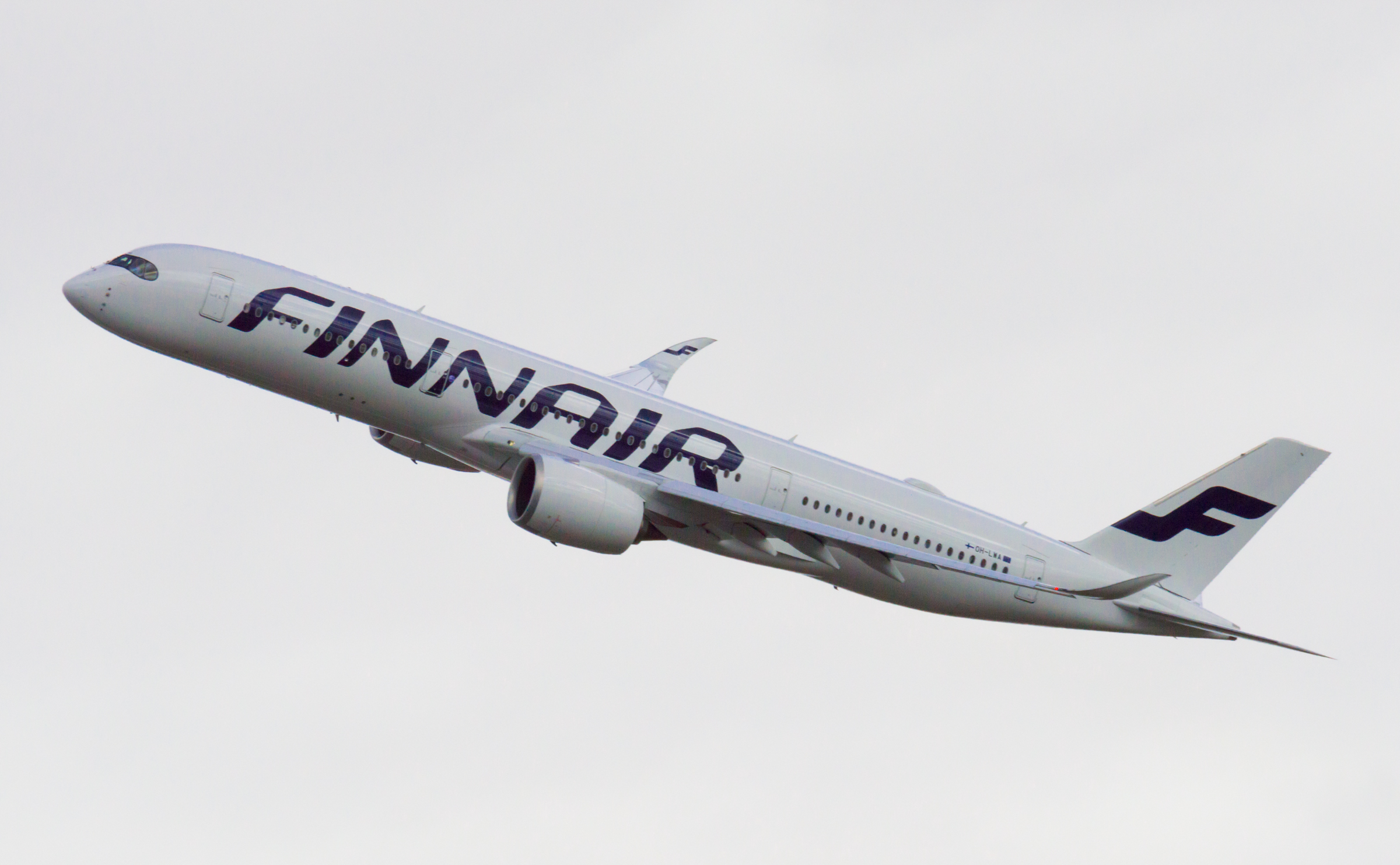
A Finnair airplane in Helsinki Airport

Finland's road system is utilized by most internal cargo and passenger traffic. The annual state operated road network expenditure of around €1 billion is paid for with vehicle and fuel taxes which amount to around €1.5 billion and €1 billion, respectively. Among the Finnish highways, the most significant and busiest main roads include the Turku Highway (E18), the Tampere Highway (E12), the Lahti Highway (E75), and the ring roads (Ring I and Ring III) of the Helsinki metropolitan area and the Tampere Ring Road of the Tampere urban area.

The main international passenger gateway is Helsinki Airport, which handled about 15.3 million passengers in 2023. Another 26 airports have scheduled passenger services. The Helsinki Airport-based Finnair, Blue1, and Nordic Regional Airlines, Norwegian Air Shuttle sell air services both domestically and internationally.

The Government annually spends around €350 million to maintain the 5,865-kilometre-long (3,644 mi) network of railway tracks. Rail transport is handled by the state-owned VR Group. Finland's first railway was opened in 1862, and today it forms part of the Finnish Main Line, which is more than 800 kilometers long. Helsinki opened the world's northernmost metro system in 1982.

The majority of international cargo shipments are handled at ports. Vuosaari Harbour in Helsinki is the largest container port in Finland; others include Kotka, Hamina, Hanko, Pori, Rauma, and Oulu. There is passenger traffic from Helsinki and Turku, which have ferry connections to Tallinn, Mariehamn, Stockholm, and Travemünde. The Helsinki-Tallinn route is one of the busiest passenger sea routes in the world.

=== Industry ===
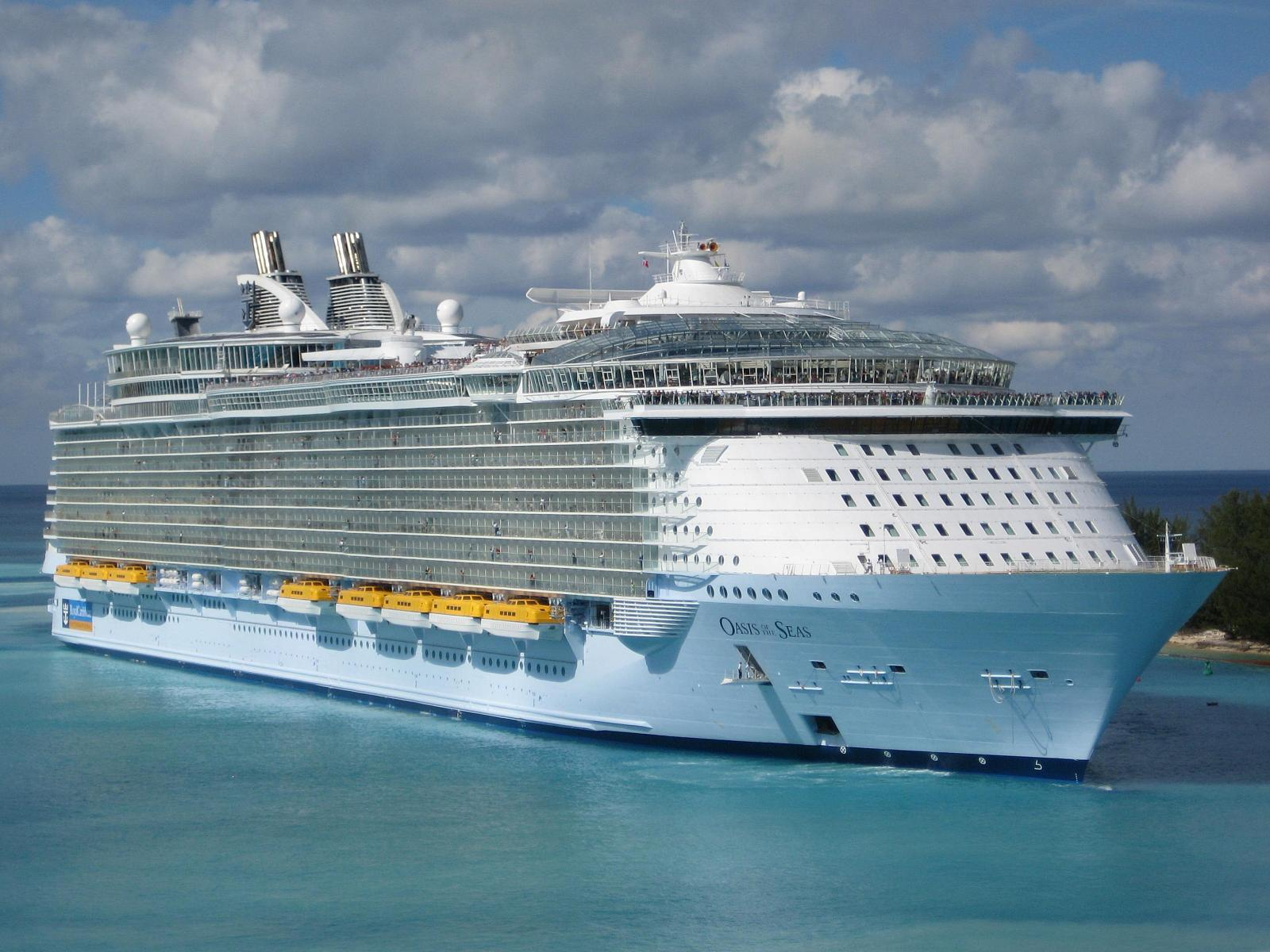
The Oasis of the Seas was built at the Perno shipyard in Turku.

Finland rapidly industrialized after World War II, achieving GDP per capita levels comparable to that of Japan or the UK at the beginning of the 1970s. Initially, most of the economic development was based on two broad groups of export-led industries, the "metal industry" (metalliteollisuus) and "forest industry" (metsäteollisuus). The "metal industry" includes shipbuilding, metalworking, the automotive industry, engineered products such as motors and electronics, and production of metals and alloys including steel, copper, and chromium. Many of the world's biggest cruise ships, including MS Freedom of the Seas and the Oasis of the Seas have been built in Finnish shipyards. The "forest industry" includes forestry, timber, pulp and paper, and is often considered a logical development based on Finland's extensive forest resources, as 73% of the area is covered by forest. In the pulp and paper industry, many major companies are based in Finland; Ahlstrom-Munksjö, Metsä Board, and UPM are all Finnish forest-based companies with revenues exceeding €1 billion. However, in recent decades, the Finnish economy has diversified, with companies expanding into fields such as electronics (Nokia), metrology (Vaisala), petroleum (Neste), and video games (Rovio Entertainment), and is no longer dominated by the two sectors of metal and forest industry. Likewise, the structure has changed, with the service sector growing. Despite this, production for export is still more prominent than in Western Europe, thus making Finland possibly more vulnerable to global economic trends.

In 2023, the Finnish economy was estimated to consist of approximately 2.3% agriculture, 23.9% manufacturing, and 61.4% services. In 2019, the per-capita income of Finland was estimated to be $48,869. In 2020, Finland was ranked 20th on the ease of doing business index, among 190 jurisdictions.

=== Public policy ===
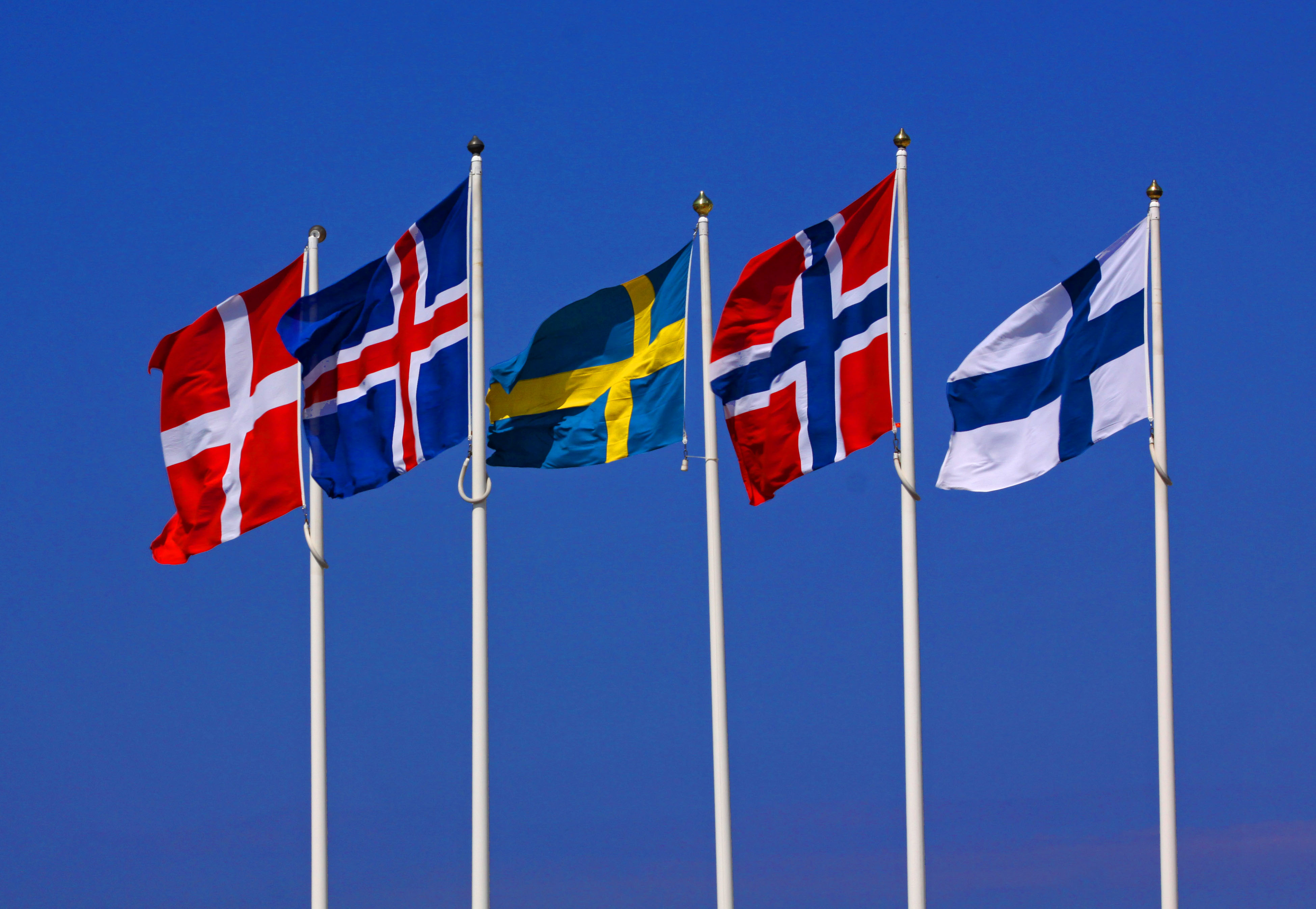
Flags of the Nordic countries from left to right: Denmark, Iceland, Sweden, Norway and Finland.

Finnish politicians have often emulated the Nordic model. Nordics have been free-trading for over a century. The level of protection in commodity trade has been low, except for agricultural products. According to the OECD, only four EU-15 countries have less regulated product markets than Finland has, and only one has less regulated financial markets. The 2024 IMD World Competitiveness Yearbook ranked Finland 15th most competitive. The World Economic Forum 2019 index ranked Finland the eleventh most competitive.

Finland is rated the least corrupt country in the world in the Corruption Perceptions Index and 20th in the Ease of doing business index.

In Finland, collective labour agreements are universally valid. These are drafted every few years for each profession and seniority level, with only a few jobs outside the system. The agreement becomes universally enforceable provided that more than 50% of the employees support it, in practice by being a member of a relevant trade union. The unionization rate is high (70%), especially in the middle class (AKAVA, mostly for university-educated professionals: 80%).

=== Tourism ===
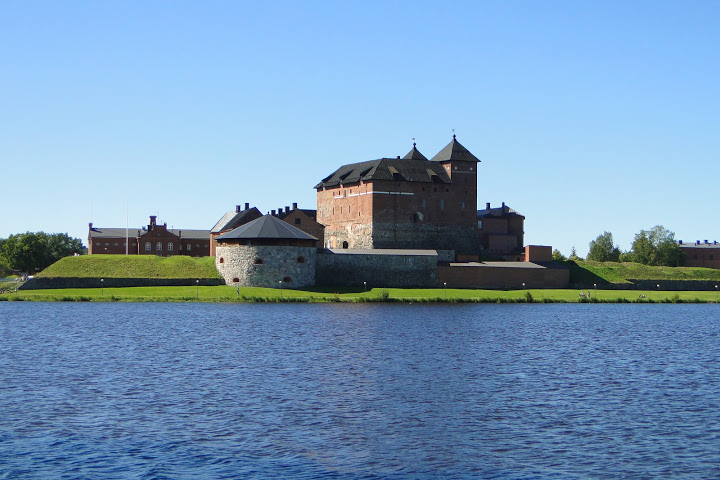
The historical Häme Castle in Hämeenlinna is located close to the Lake Vanajavesi.

In 2017, tourism in Finland grossed approximately €15.0 billion. Of this, €4.6 billion (30%) came from foreign tourism. In 2017, there were 15.2 million overnight stays of domestic tourists and 6.7 million overnight stays of foreign tourists. Tourism contributes roughly 2.7% to Finland's GDP.

Lapland has the highest tourism consumption of any Finnish region. Above the Arctic Circle, in midwinter, there is a polar night, a period when the sun does not rise for days or weeks, or even months, and correspondingly, midnight sun in the summer, with no sunset even at midnight (for up to 73 consecutive days, at the northernmost point). Lapland is so far north that the aurora borealis, fluorescence in the high atmosphere due to solar wind, is seen regularly in the fall, winter, and spring. Finnish Lapland is also locally regarded as the home of Santa Claus, with several theme parks, such as Santa Claus Village and Santa Park in Rovaniemi. Other significant tourist destinations in Lapland also include ski resorts (such as Levi, Ruka and Ylläs) and sleigh rides led by either reindeer or huskies.

Tourist attractions in Finland include the natural landscape found throughout the country as well as urban attractions. Finland contains 40 national parks (such as Koli National Park in North Karelia), from the Southern shores of the Gulf of Finland to the high fells of Lapland. Outdoor activities range from Nordic skiing, golf, fishing, yachting, lake cruises, hiking, and kayaking, among many others. Bird-watching is popular for those fond of avifauna, however, hunting is also popular.

The most famous tourist attractions in Helsinki include the Helsinki Cathedral and the Suomenlinna sea fortress. The most well-known Finnish amusement parks include Linnanmäki in Helsinki and Särkänniemi in Tampere. St. Olaf's Castle (Olavinlinna) in Savonlinna hosts the annual Savonlinna Opera Festival, and the medieval milieus of the cities of Turku, Rauma and Porvoo also attract spectators. Commercial cruises between major coastal and port cities in the Baltic region play a significant role in the local tourism industry.

== Demographics ==
Population by continent
of origin (2025)
1. Finland (88.3%)
2. Rest of Europe (5.60%)
3. Asia (4.20%)
4. Africa (1.40%)
5. Americas (0.30%)
6. Oceania (0.10%)

The population of Finland is approximately 5.7 million. The birth rate is 7.8 per 1,000 inhabitants, giving a fertility rate of 1.26 children born per woman, one of the lowest in the world and well below the replacement rate of 2.1. In 1887, Finland recorded its highest rate, with 5.17 children born per woman. The child mortality rate is 2.1 deaths per every 1,000 births, one of the lowest in the world; this is attributed to a strong medical system and robust maternal care initiatives, including the maternity package programme. Finland has one of the oldest populations in the world, with a median age of 44.1 years and 23.8% of the population aged 65 and over. Finland has an average population density of 19 inhabitants per square kilometre. This is the third lowest population density in Europe, after Norway and Iceland, and the lowest in the European Union. Finland's population has always been concentrated in the southern parts of the country, a phenomenon that became more pronounced during the urbanization of the 20th century. Three of Finland's four largest cities are located in the Helsinki Metropolitan Area: Helsinki, Espoo and Vantaa. The city of Tampere is third after Helsinki and Espoo, and Vantaa is fourth. Other cities with more than 100,000 inhabitants are Turku, Oulu, Jyväskylä, Kuopio, and Lahti.

Finland's immigrant population is growing. As of 2025, there were 660,800 people with a foreign background living in Finland (11.7% of the population), most of them from Ukraine, Estonia, Iraq, Somalia, China and India. The children of foreigners are not automatically granted Finnish citizenship, as Finnish citizenship law maintains a policy of jus sanguinis, whereby only children born to at least one Finnish parent are granted citizenship. If they are born in Finland and cannot obtain citizenship of another country, they become Finnish citizens. In addition, certain people of Finnish descent living in countries that were once part of the Soviet Union retain the right of return, i.e. the right to establish permanent residence in the country, which would eventually entitle them to citizenship. As of 2025, 10.9% of the Finnish population were foreign born. As a result of recent immigration, the country has significant populations of ethnic Estonians, Russians, Ukrainians, Iraqis, Chinese, Somalis, Filipinos, Indians, and Iranians.

Finland's national minorities include the Sámi, Roma, Jews, and Tatars. The Roma of the Finnish Kale group settled in the country at the end of the 16th century.

=== Languages ===
Municipalities of Finland: unilingually Finnish bilingual with Finnish as majority language, Swedish as minority language bilingual with Swedish as majority language, Finnish as minority language unilingually Swedish bilingual with Finnish as majority language, Sami as minority language

Finnish and Swedish are the official languages of Finland. Finnish predominates nationwide while Swedish is spoken in some coastal areas in the west and south (with towns such as Ekenäs, Pargas, Närpes, Kristinestad, Jakobstad and Nykarleby.) and in the autonomous region of Åland, which is the only monolingual Swedish-speaking region in Finland. As of 2025, the native language of 83.5% of the population was Finnish, which is part of the Finnic subgroup of the Uralic language family. The language is one of only four official EU languages not of Indo-European origin, and has no relation through descent to the other national languages of the Nordics. Conversely, Finnish is closely related to Estonian and Karelian, and more distantly to Hungarian and the Sámi languages.

Swedish is the native language of 5.0% of the population (Swedish-speaking Finns). Swedish is a compulsory school subject and general knowledge of the language is good among many non-native speakers. Likewise, a majority of Swedish-speaking non-Ålanders can speak Finnish. The Finnish side of the land border with Sweden is unilingually Finnish-speaking. The Swedish across the border is distinct from the Swedish spoken in Finland. There is a sizeable pronunciation difference between the varieties of Swedish spoken in the two countries, although their mutual intelligibility is nearly universal.

Finnish Romani is spoken by some 5,000–6,000 people; there are 13,000-14,000 Romani people in Finland. Romani and Finnish Sign Language are also recognized in the constitution. There are two sign languages: Finnish Sign Language, spoken natively by 4,000–5,000 people, and Finland-Swedish Sign Language, spoken natively by about 150 people. Tatar is spoken by a Finnish Tatar minority of about 800 people whose ancestors moved to Finland mainly between the 1870s and 1920s.

The Sámi languages have an official status in parts of Lapland, where the Sámi, numbering over 10,000 are recognized as an indigenous people. About a quarter of them speak a Sámi language as their mother tongue. The Sámi languages that are spoken in Finland are Northern Sami, Inari Sami, and Skolt Sami. (Note: The names for Finland in its Sami languages are: Suopma (Northern Sami), Suomâ (Inari Sami) and Lää'ddjânnam (Skolt Sami). See Geonames.de.) The rights of minority groups (in particular Sami, Swedish speakers, and Romani people) are protected by the constitution. The Nordic languages and Karelian are also specially recognized in parts of Finland.

As of 2025, the most common foreign languages are Russian (1.8%), Estonian (0.9%), Ukrainian (0.8%), Arabic (0.8%), and English (0.7%).

English is studied by most pupils as a compulsory subject from the first grade (at seven years of age), formerly from the third or fifth grade, in the comprehensive school (in some schools other languages can be chosen instead). German, French, Spanish and Russian can be studied as second foreign languages from the fourth grade (at 10 years of age; some schools may offer other options).

Savonian was recognized as an official "language" of the region of Rautavaara in 2026, with the municipality calling on other Eastern Finnish municipalities to follow with the decision. Although the municipality did not intend to replace the use of Standard Finnish, this decision will allow its use in official municipality meetings, and encouraged the translation of municipal signs and maps into Savonian. The municipality also encouraged future talks concerning possible prerequisites of Savonian becoming recognized as an official minority language of Finland.

=== Largest cities ===
Largest cities or towns in Finland Statistics Finland
Rank	Name	Region	Pop.	Rank	Name	Region	Pop.
1	Helsinki	Uusimaa	694,392	11	Joensuu	North Karelia	79,129
2	Espoo	Uusimaa	325,716	12	Kouvola	Kymenlaakso	77,625
3	Tampere	Pirkanmaa	263,337	13	Lappeenranta	South Karelia	73,241
4	Vantaa	Uusimaa	252,956	14	Vaasa	Ostrobothnia	71,209
5	Oulu	North Ostrobothnia	217,469	15	Hämeenlinna	Kanta-Häme	68,614
6	Turku	Southwest Finland	209,633	16	Seinäjoki	South Ostrobothnia	67,283
7	Jyväskylä	Central Finland	149,895	17	Rovaniemi	Lapland	66,191
8	Kuopio	North Savo	126,572	18	Mikkeli	South Savo	51,551
9	Lahti	Päijät-Häme	121,832	19	Porvoo	Uusimaa	51,863
10	Pori	Satakunta	83,010	20	Salo	Southwest Finland	50,339

=== Religion ===
Registered members of religions groups in Finland by the Statistics Finland (2025)
1. Evangelical Lutheran Church (61.2%)
2. Orthodox Church (1.00%)
3. Other Christian (1.00%)
4. Islam (0.50%)
5. Other Religions (0.40%)
6. Unaffiliated (35.9%)

With 3.5 million members, the Evangelical Lutheran Church of Finland is Finland's largest religious body; As of 2025, 61.2% of Finns were members of the church. The Evangelical Lutheran Church of Finland has seen its share of the country's population declining by roughly one percent annually in recent years. The decline has been due to both church membership resignations and falling baptism rates. The second largest group, accounting for 35.9% of the population, has no religious affiliation. A small minority belongs to the Finnish Orthodox Church (1.0%). Other Protestant denominations and the Roman Catholic Church are significantly smaller, as are the Jewish and other non-Christian communities (totalling 1.6%). The Pew Research Center estimated the Muslim population at 2.7% in 2016.

Finland's state church was the Church of Sweden until 1809. As an autonomous Grand Duchy under Russia from 1809 to 1917, Finland retained the Lutheran State Church system, and the Evangelical Lutheran Church of Finland was established. After Finland had gained independence in 1917, religious freedom was declared in the constitution of 1919, and a separate law on religious freedom in 1922. Through this arrangement, the Evangelical Lutheran Church of Finland gained a constitutional status as a national church alongside the Finnish Orthodox Church, whose position however is not codified in the constitution. The main Lutheran and Orthodox churches have special roles such as in state ceremonies and schools.

In 2016, 69.3% of Finnish newborn children were baptized, but by 2019, this figure had declined to around 62%; 82.3% of children aged 15 were confirmed in 2012 and over 90% of the funerals are Christian. However, the majority of Lutherans attend church only for special occasions like Christmas ceremonies, weddings, and funerals. The Lutheran Church estimates that approximately 1.8% of its members attend church services weekly. The average number of church visits per year by church members is approximately two.

According to a 2010 Eurobarometer poll, 33% of Finnish citizens responded that they "believe there is a God"; 42% answered that they "believe there is some sort of spirit or life force"; and 22% that they "do not believe there is any sort of spirit, God, or life force". According to ISSP survey data (2008), 8% consider themselves "highly religious", and 31% "moderately religious". In the same survey, 28% reported themselves as "agnostic" and 29% as "non-religious".

=== Health ===
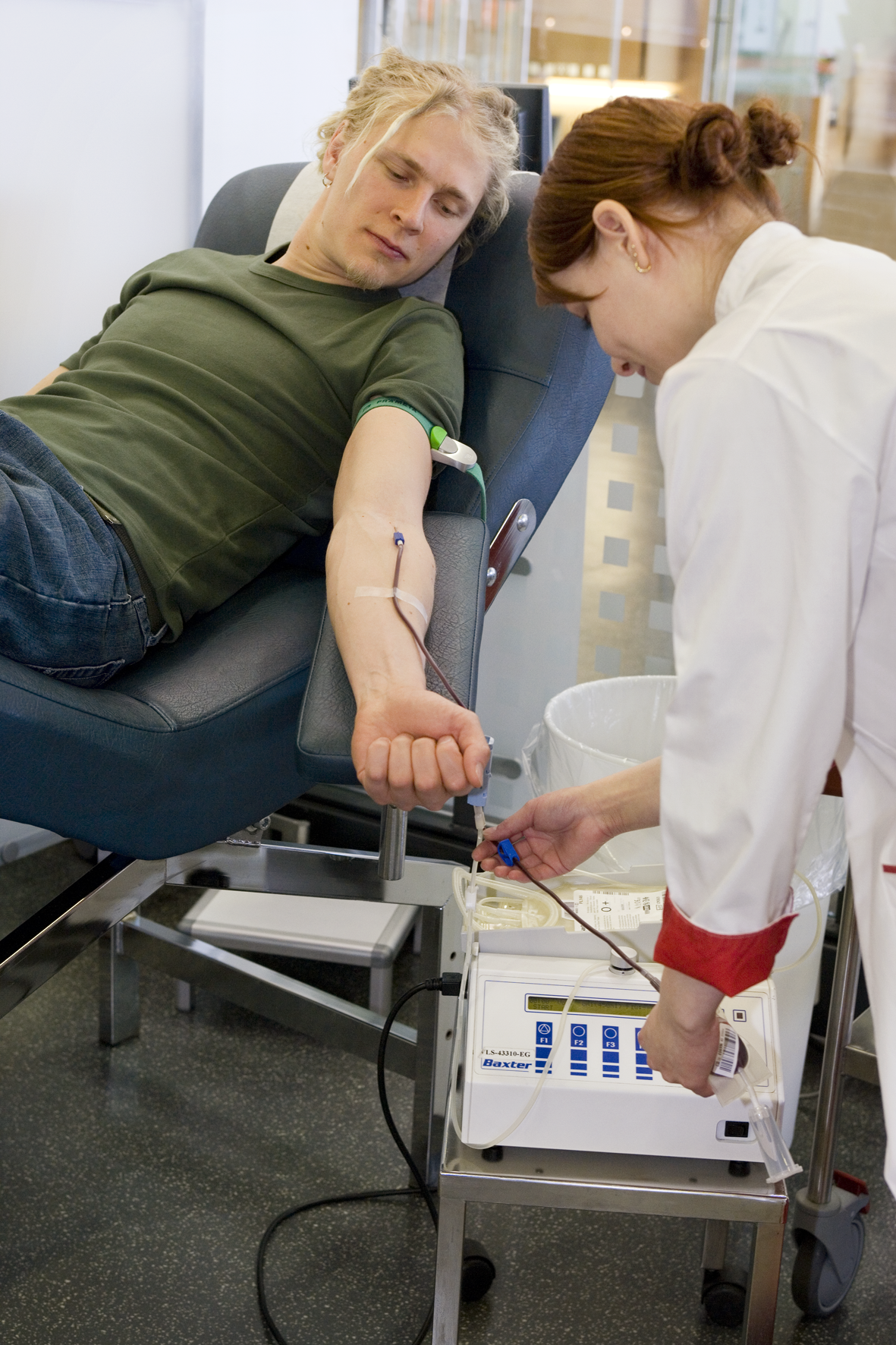
A man donating blood at Finnish Red Cross Blood Service

Life expectancy was 79 years for men and 84.2 years for women in 2023. The under-five mortality rate was 2.3 per 1,000 live births in 2022, ranking Finland's rate among the lowest in the world. The fertility rate in 2023 stood at 1.26 children born/per woman and has been below the replacement rate of 2.1 since 1969. With a low birth rate women also become mothers at a later age, the mean age at first live birth being 30.3 in 2023. A 2011 study published in The Lancet medical journal found that Finland had the lowest stillbirth rate out of 193 countries.

There has been a slight increase or no change in welfare and health inequalities between population groups in the 21st century. Lifestyle-related diseases are on the rise. More than half a million Finns suffer from diabetes, type 1 diabetes being globally the most common in Finland. Many children are diagnosed with type 2 diabetes. The number of musculoskeletal diseases and cancers are increasing, although the cancer prognosis has improved. Allergies and dementia are also growing health problems in Finland. One of the most common reasons for work disability are due to mental disorders, in particular depression. Without age standardization, the suicide rates were 13 per 100 000 in 2015, close to the North European average. Age-standardized suicide rates are still among the highest among developed countries in the OECD.

There are 307 residents for each doctor. About 19% of health care is funded directly by households and 77% by taxation.

In April 2012, Finland was ranked second in Gross National Happiness in a report published by The Earth Institute. Since 2012, Finland has every time ranked at least in the top 5 of world's happiest countries in the annual World Happiness Report by the United Nations, as well as ranking as the happiest country since 2018.

=== Education and science ===
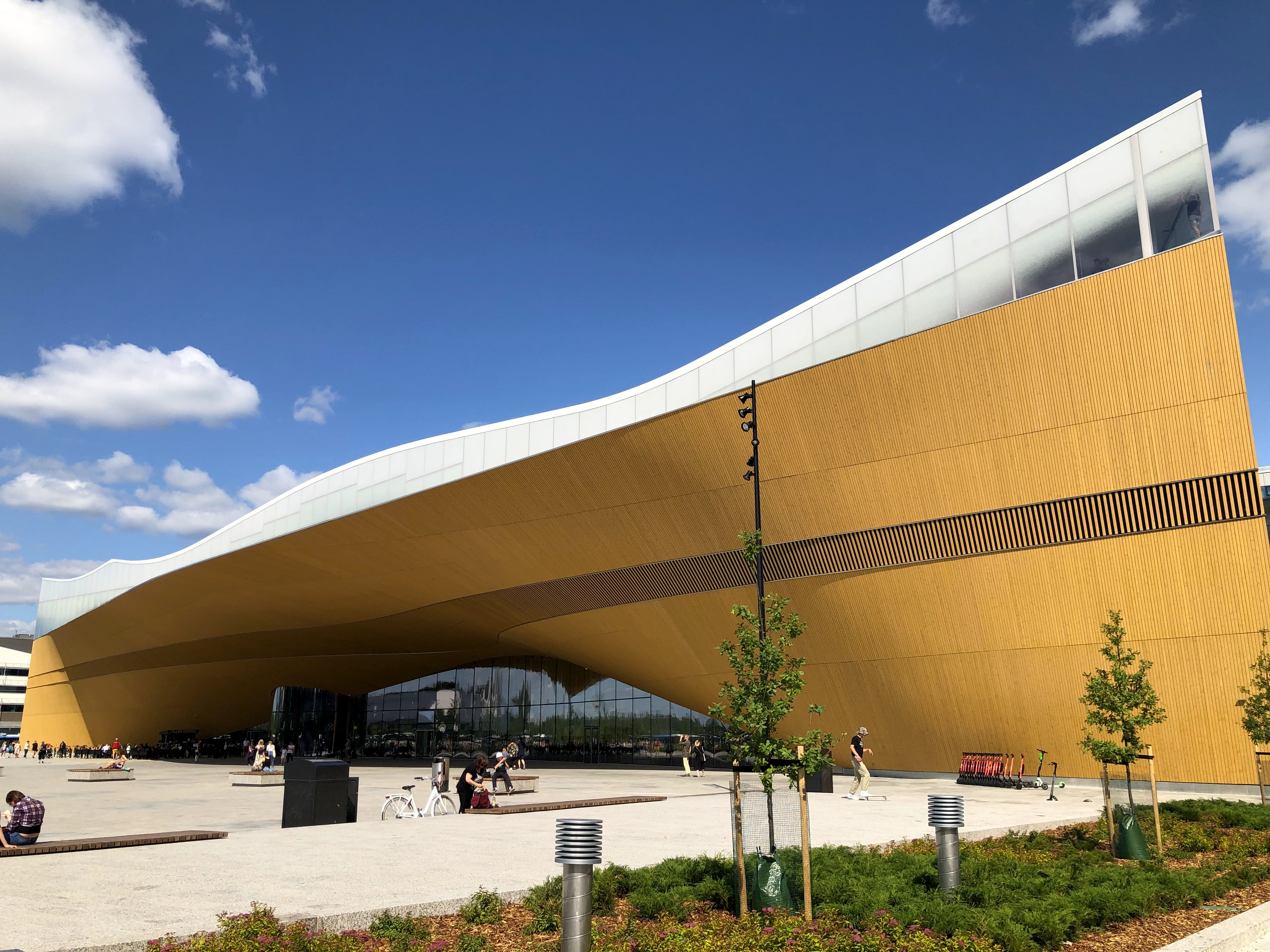
Helsinki Central Library Oodi was chosen as the best new public library in the world in 2019.

Most pre-tertiary education is arranged at the municipal level. Around 3 percent of students are enrolled in private schools (mostly specialist language and international schools). Formal education is usually started at the age of 7. Primary school takes normally six years and lower secondary school three years.

The curriculum is set by the Ministry of Education and Culture and the Education Board. Education is compulsory between the ages of 7 and 18. After lower secondary school, graduates may apply to trade schools or gymnasiums (upper secondary schools). Trade schools offer a vocational education: approximately 40% of an age group choose this path after the lower secondary school. Academically oriented gymnasiums have higher entrance requirements and specifically prepare for Abitur and tertiary education. Graduation from either formally qualifies for tertiary education.

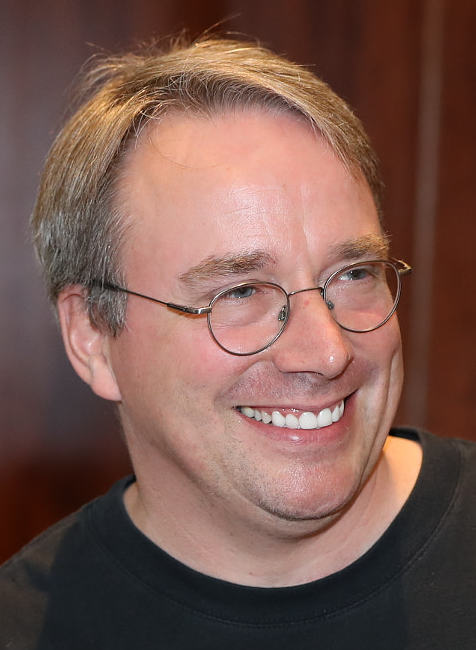
Linus Torvalds, the Finnish software engineer best known for creating the popular open-source kernel Linux.

In tertiary education, two mostly separate and non-interoperating sectors are found: the profession-oriented polytechnics and the research-oriented universities. Education is free and living expenses are to a large extent financed by the government through student benefits. There are 15 universities and 24 Universities of Applied Sciences (UAS) in the country. The University of Helsinki is ranked 117th in the Top University Ranking of 2025. Other reputable universities of Finland include Aalto University in Espoo, both University of Turku and Åbo Akademi University in Turku, University of Jyväskylä, University of Oulu, LUT University in Lappeenranta and Lahti, University of Eastern Finland in Kuopio and Joensuu, and Tampere University.

The World Economic Forum ranks Finland's tertiary education No. 2 in the world. Around 33% of residents have a tertiary degree, similar to Nordics and more than in most other OECD countries except Canada (44%), United States (38%) and Japan (37%). In addition, 38% of Finland's population has a university or college degree, which is among the highest percentages in the world. Adult education appears in several forms, such as secondary evening schools, civic and workers' institutes, study centres, vocational course centres, and folk high schools.

More than 30% of tertiary graduates are in science-related fields. Forest improvement, materials research, environmental sciences, neural networks, low-temperature physics, brain research, biotechnology, genetic technology, and communications showcase fields of study where Finnish researchers have had a significant impact. Finland is highly productive in scientific research. In 2005, Finland had the fourth most scientific publications per capita of the OECD countries. In 2007, 1,801 patents were filed in Finland.

== Culture ==
=== Literature ===
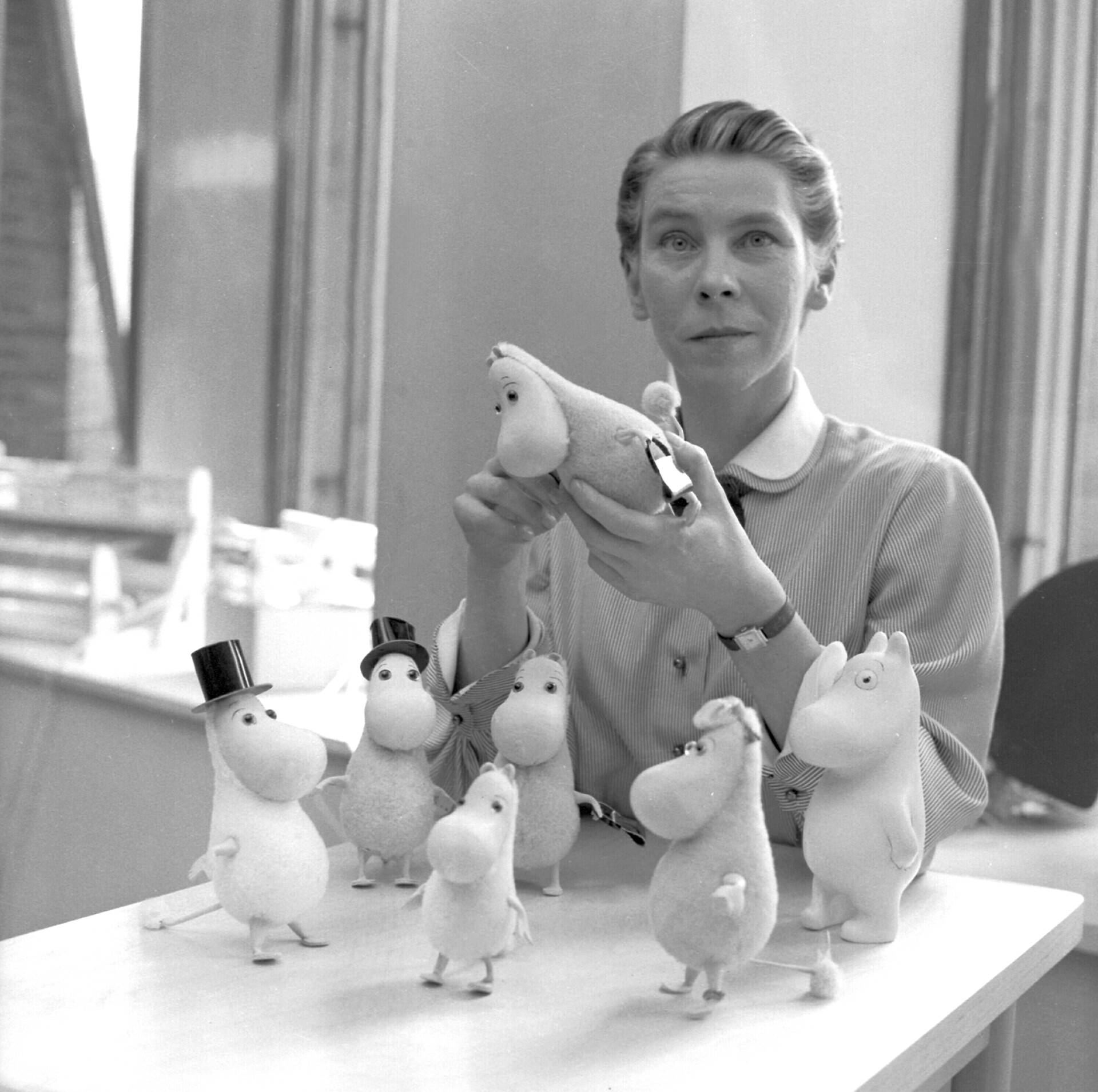
Writer and artist Tove Jansson

Written Finnish can be said to have existed since Mikael Agricola translated the New Testament into Finnish during the Protestant Reformation in the 16th century. However, few notable works of literature were produced until the 19th century, which marked the emergence of a Finnish national Romantic Movement. This period prompted Elias Lönnrot to collect Finnish and Karelian folk poetry and to arrange and publish them as the Kalevala, the Finnish national epic. The era saw a rise of poets and novelists writing in Finnish, most notably the national writer Aleksis Kivi (The Seven Brothers), as well as Minna Canth, Eino Leino, and Juhani Aho, who was nominated for the Nobel Prize in Literature twelve times.

Alongside Finnish-language literature, many authors of the national awakening wrote in Swedish. Prominent among them were the national poet Johan Ludvig Runeberg (The Tales of Ensign Stål) and Zachris Topelius, whose works occupy a central place in Finland-Swedish literature.

Following Finland's independence, modernist tendencies gained prominence. This development was exemplified by the Finland-Swedish poet Edith Södergran, while Finnish-language authors increasingly explored national, historical, and social themes. Key figures of the early and mid-20th century include Frans Eemil Sillanpää, who was awarded the Nobel Prize in Literature in 1939, the historical novelist Mika Waltari, and Väinö Linna, whose works The Unknown Soldier and the Under the North Star trilogy became central texts of post-war Finnish literature. From the 1950s onwards, Finnish poetry embraced modernism, beginning with Paavo Haavikko.

In contemporary Finnish literature, a wide range of genres and styles coexist. Detective fiction and popular literature have enjoyed particular success. At the same time, the Finland-Swedish writer and artist Tove Jansson has become one of Finland's most internationally recognized authors. Best known as the creator of The Moomins, she is among the most translated Finnish writers, and her work has had a lasting impact on Finnish and international popular culture, extending far beyond literature into visual media, museums, and other cultural forms.

=== Visual arts, design, and architecture ===
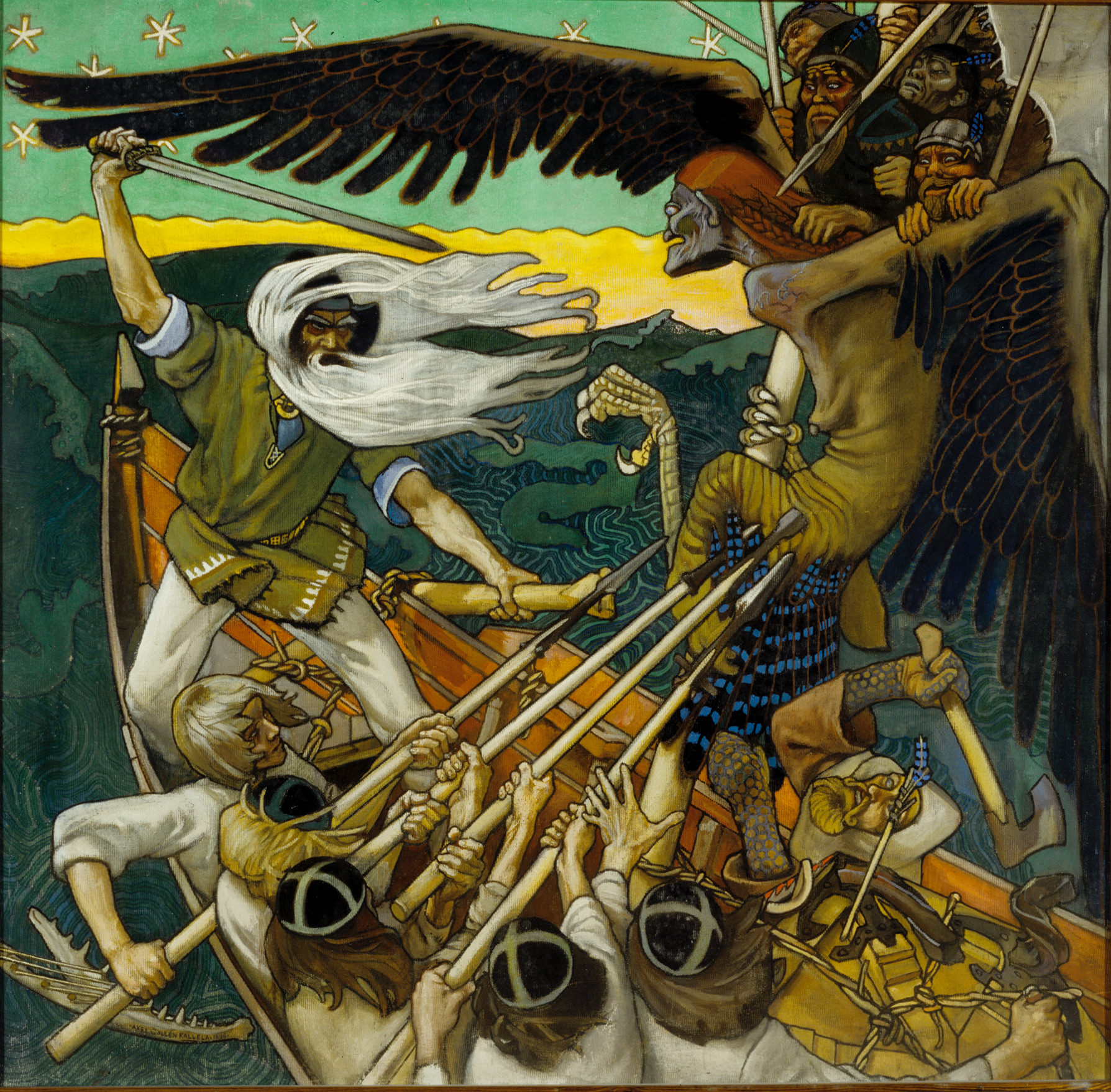
Akseli Gallen-Kallela, The Defense of the Sampo, 1896, Turku Art Museum

The visual arts in Finland started to form their characteristics in the 19th century when Romantic nationalism was rising in autonomous Finland. The best known Finnish painters, Akseli Gallen-Kallela, started painting in a naturalist style but moved to national romanticism. Other notable painters of the era include Pekka Halonen, Eero Järnefelt, Helene Schjerfbeck, and Hugo Simberg. In the late 20th century, the homoerotic art of Touko Laaksonen, pseudonym Tom of Finland, found a worldwide audience.

Finland's best-known sculptor of the 20th century was Wäinö Aaltonen, remembered for his monumental busts and sculptures. The works of Eila Hiltunen and Laila Pullinen exemplify modernism in sculpture.

Finns have made major contributions to handicrafts and industrial design: among the internationally renowned figures are Timo Sarpaneva, Tapio Wirkkala and Ilmari Tapiovaara. Finnish architecture is famous around the world, and has contributed significantly to several styles internationally, such as Jugendstil (or Art Nouveau), Nordic Classicism, and functionalism. Among the top 20th-century Finnish architects to gain international recognition are Eliel Saarinen and his son Eero Saarinen. Architect Alvar Aalto is regarded as among the most important 20th-century designers in the world; he helped bring functionalist architecture to Finland, but soon was a pioneer in its development towards an organic style. Aalto is also famous for his work in furniture, lamps, textiles, and glassware, which were usually incorporated into his buildings.

=== Music ===
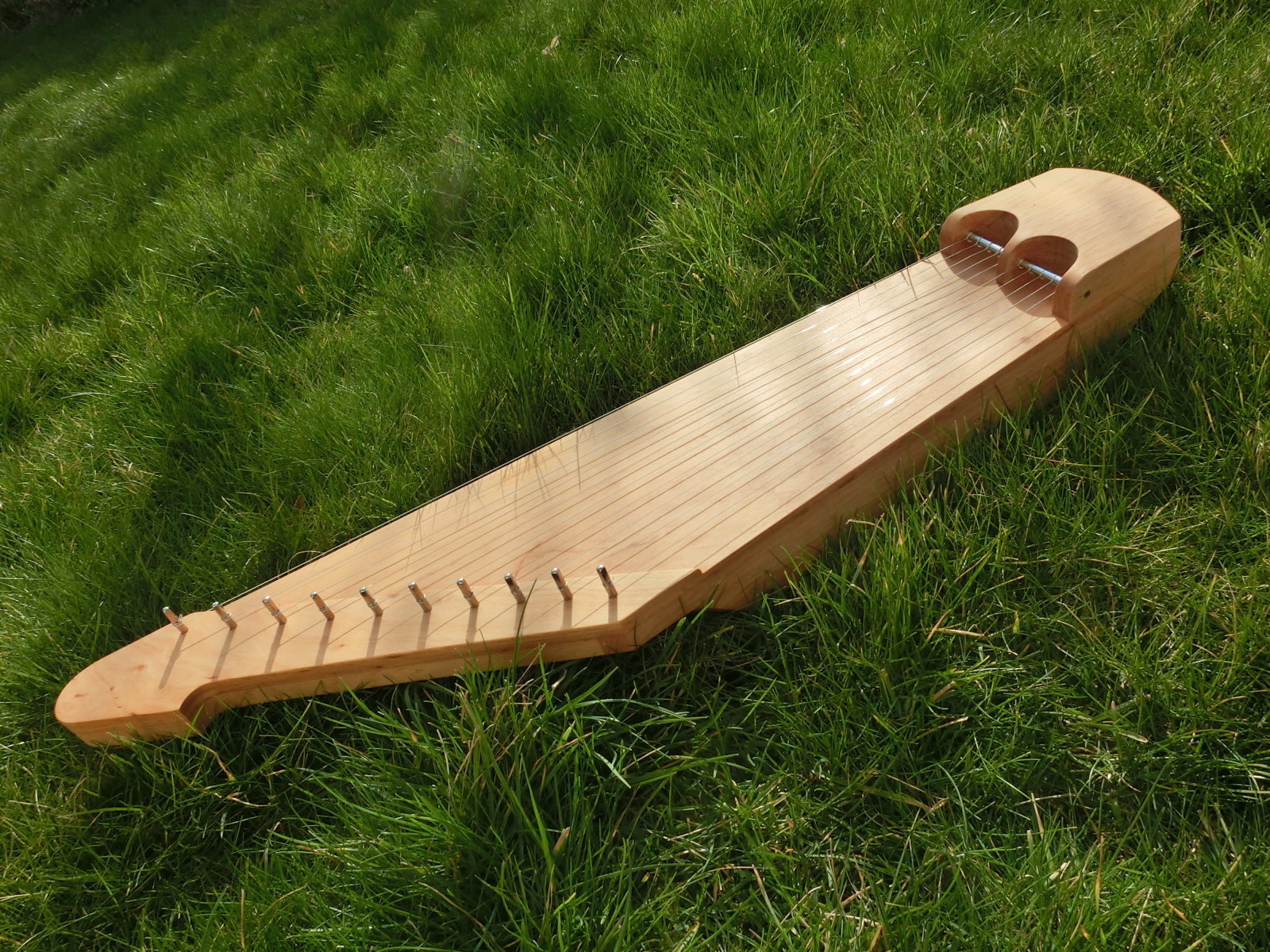
The kantele is Finland's national and traditional instrument.

==== Folk ====
Finnish folk music can be divided into Nordic dance music and the older tradition of poem singing, poems from which the national epic, the Kalevala, was created. Much of Finland's classical music is influenced by traditional Finnish and Karelian melodies and lyrics, as comprised in the Kalevala. In the historical region of Finnish Karelia, as well as other parts of Eastern Finland, the old poem singing traditions were preserved better than in the western parts of the country. In the 19th century Nordic folk dance music largely replaced the kalevaic tradition. Finnish folk music has undergone a roots revival and has become a part of popular music. The people of northern Finland, Sweden, and Norway, the Sámi, are known primarily for highly spiritual songs called joik.

==== Classical ====
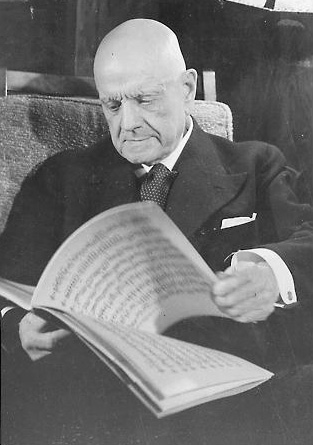
The Finnish composer Jean Sibelius (1865–1957) was a significant figure in the history of classical music.

The first Finnish opera was written by the German-born composer Fredrik Pacius in 1852. Pacius also wrote the music to the poem Maamme/Vårt land (Our Country), Finland's national anthem. In the 1890s Finnish nationalism based on the Kalevala spread, and Jean Sibelius became famous for his vocal symphony Kullervo. In 1899 he composed Finlandia, which played an important role in Finland gaining independence. He remains one of Finland's most popular national figures.

Alongside Sibelius, the distinct Finnish style of music was created by Oskar Merikanto, Toivo Kuula, Erkki Melartin, Leevi Madetoja, and Uuno Klami. Important modernist composers include Einojuhani Rautavaara, Aulis Sallinen, and Magnus Lindberg, among others. Kaija Saariaho was ranked the world's greatest living composer in a 2019 composers' poll. Many Finnish musicians have achieved international success. Among them are the conductor Esa-Pekka Salonen, the opera singer Karita Mattila and the violinist Pekka Kuusisto.

==== Popular music ====
Iskelmä (coined directly from the German word Schlager, meaning "hit") is a traditional Finnish word for a light popular song. Finnish popular music also includes various kinds of dance music; tango, a style of Argentine music, is also popular. The light music in Swedish-speaking areas has more influences from Sweden. At least a couple of Finnish polkas are known worldwide, such as Säkkijärven polkka and "Ievan polkka".

During the 1970s, progressive rock group Wigwam and rock and roll group Hurriganes gained respect abroad. The Finnish punk scene produced some internationally acknowledged names including Terveet Kädet in the 1980s. Hanoi Rocks was a pioneering glam rock act. Many Finnish metal bands have gained international recognition; Finland has been often called the "Promised Land of Heavy Metal" because there are more than 50 metal Bands for every 100,000 inhabitants – more than any other nation in the world. Modern Finnish popular music includes a number of prominent rock musicians, pop musicians, jazz musicians, hip-hop performers, and dance music acts.

Finland has won the Eurovision Song Contest once in 2006 when Lordi won the contest with the song ''Hard Rock Hallelujah''. The Finnish pop artist Käärijä also got second place in the contest in 2023 with his worldwide hit song ''Cha Cha Cha''.

=== Cinema and television ===
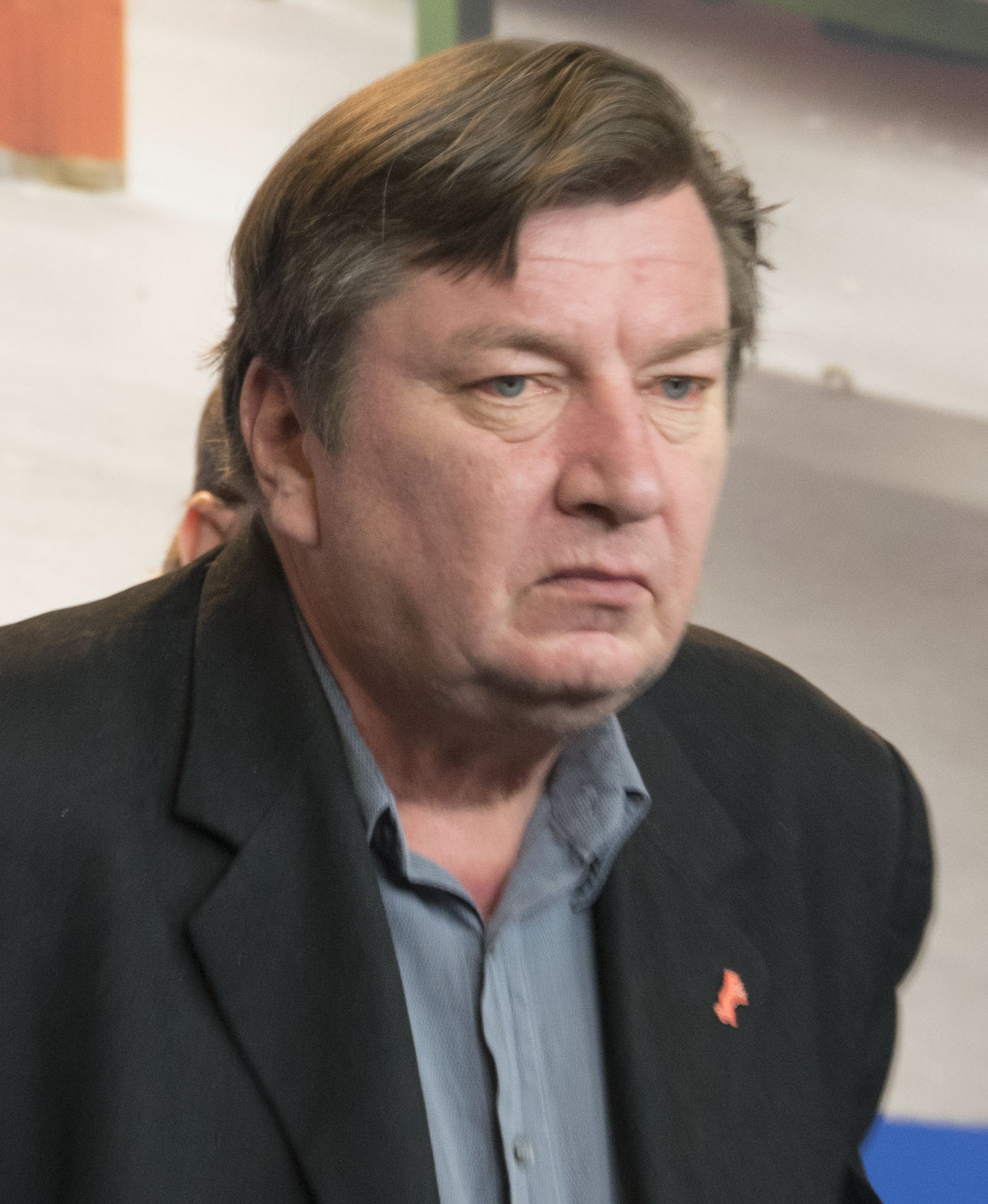
Film director Aki Kaurismäki

In the film industry, notable modern directors include brothers Mika and Aki Kaurismäki, Dome Karukoski, Antti Jokinen, Jalmari Helander, and Renny Harlin. Some Finnish drama series are internationally known, such as Bordertown.

One of the most internationally successful Finnish films are The White Reindeer, directed by Erik Blomberg in 1952, which won the Golden Globe Award for Best Non-English Language Film in 1956; The Man Without a Past, directed by Aki Kaurismäki in 2002, which was nominated for the Academy Award for Best International Feature Film in 2002 and won the Grand Prix at the 2002 Cannes Film Festival; and The Fencer, directed by Klaus Härö in 2015, which was nominated for the 73rd Golden Globes in the Best Non-English Language Film category as a Finnish/German/Estonian co-production. A 2022 action film Sisu, directed by Jalmari Helander, has achieved the status of the most successful Finnish film of all time in the United States, measured at the box office, with revenues of over $7 million.

In Finland, the most significant films in Finnish history includes The Unknown Soldier (1955) and Here, Beneath the North Star (1968), both directed by Edvin Laine. A 1960 crime comedy film Inspector Palmu's Mistake, directed by Matti Kassila, was voted in 2012 the best Finnish film of all time by Finnish film critics and journalists, but the 1984 comedy film Uuno Turhapuro in the Army, the ninth film in Uuno Turhapuro film series, remains Finland's most seen domestic film made by Finnish audience.

=== Media and communications ===
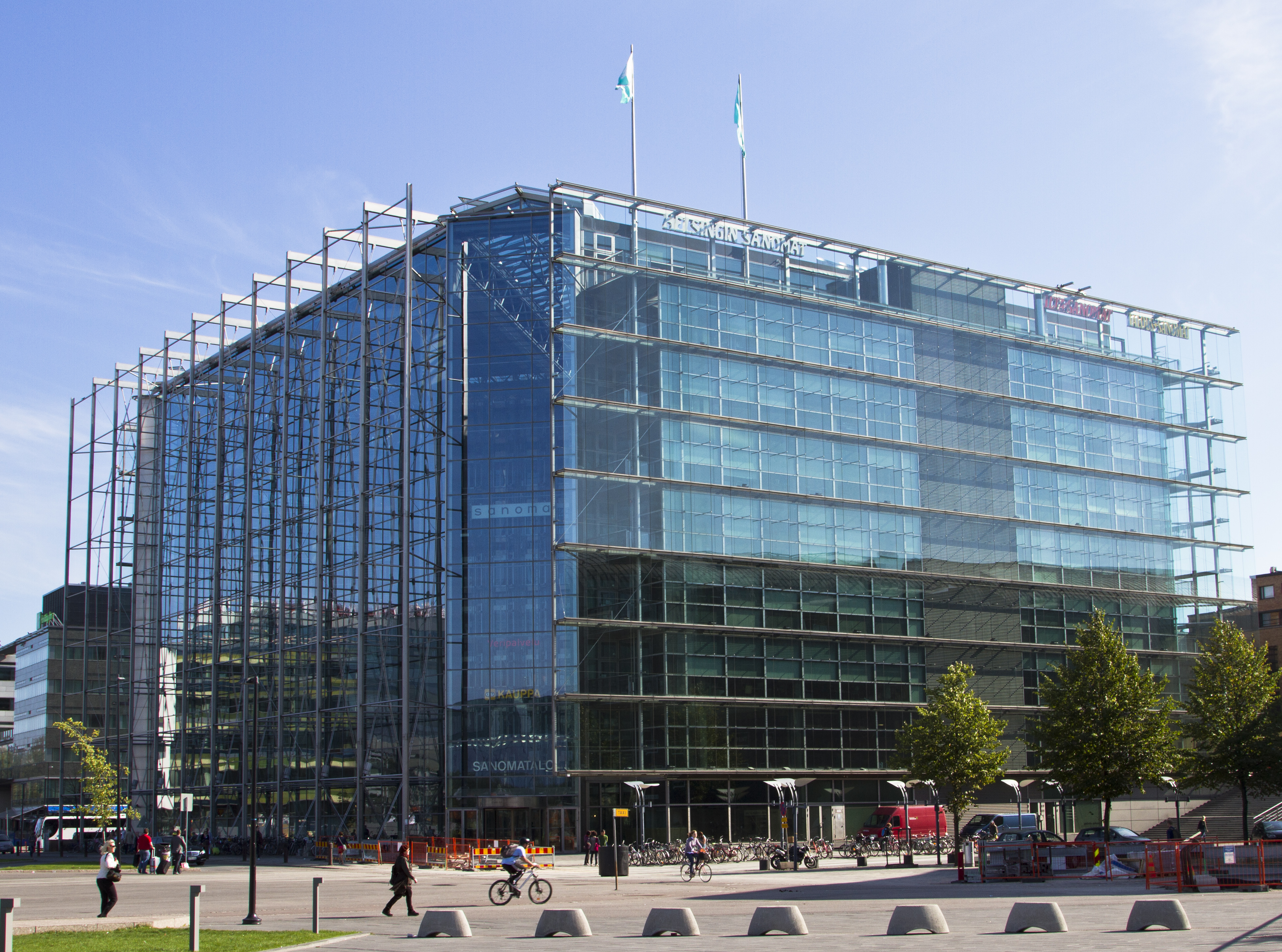
Sanomatalo houses several offices of newspapers and radio stations.

Today, there are around 200 newspapers, 320 popular magazines, 2,100 professional magazines, and 67 commercial radio stations. The largest newspaper is Helsingin Sanomat, its circulation being 339,437 as of 2019. Yle, the Finnish Broadcasting Company, operates five television channels and thirteen radio channels. Each year, around 12,000 book titles are published.

Thanks to its emphasis on transparency and equal rights, Finland's press has been rated the freest in the world. Worldwide, Finns, along with other Nordic peoples and the Japanese, spend the most time reading newspapers. In regards to telecommunication infrastructure, Finland is ranked third, below the United States and Singapore in the Portulan Institute's Network Readiness Index (NRI) – an indicator for determining the development level of a country's information and communication technologies.

=== Sauna ===
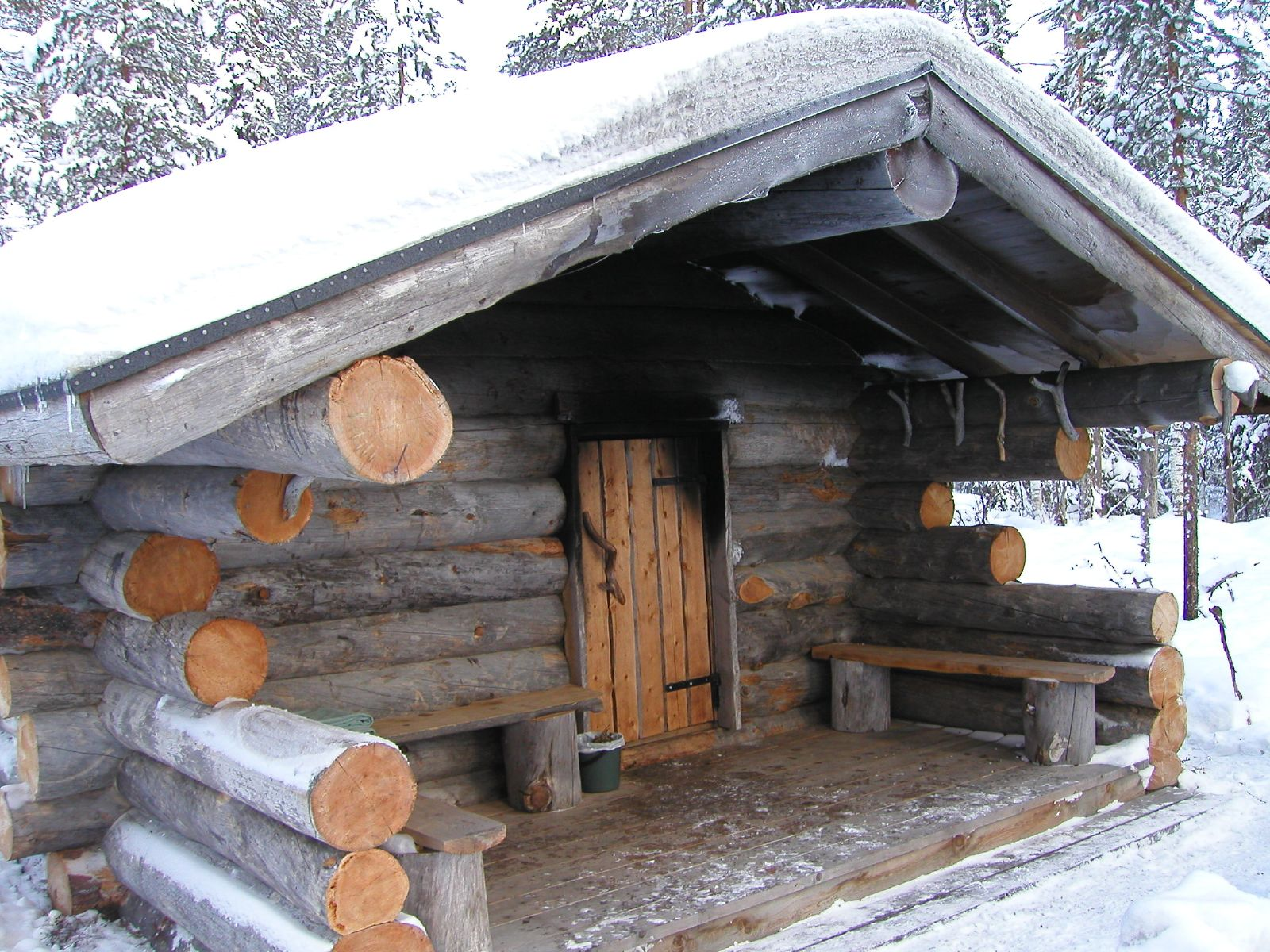
A smoke sauna in Ruka, Kuusamo

The Finns' love for saunas is generally associated with Finnish cultural tradition. Sauna is a type of dry steam bath practiced widely in Finland, which is especially evident in the strong tradition around Midsummer and Christmas. The word sauna is of Proto-Finnish origin (found in Finnic and Sámi languages) dating back 7,000 years. Steam baths have been part of European tradition elsewhere as well, but the sauna has survived best in Finland, in addition to Sweden, Estonia, Latvia, Russia, Norway, and parts of the United States and Canada. Moreover, nearly all Finnish houses have either their own sauna or in multi-story apartment houses, a timeshare sauna. Municipal swimming halls and hotels have often their own saunas. The Finnish sauna culture is inscribed on the UNESCO Intangible Cultural Heritage Lists.

=== Cuisine ===
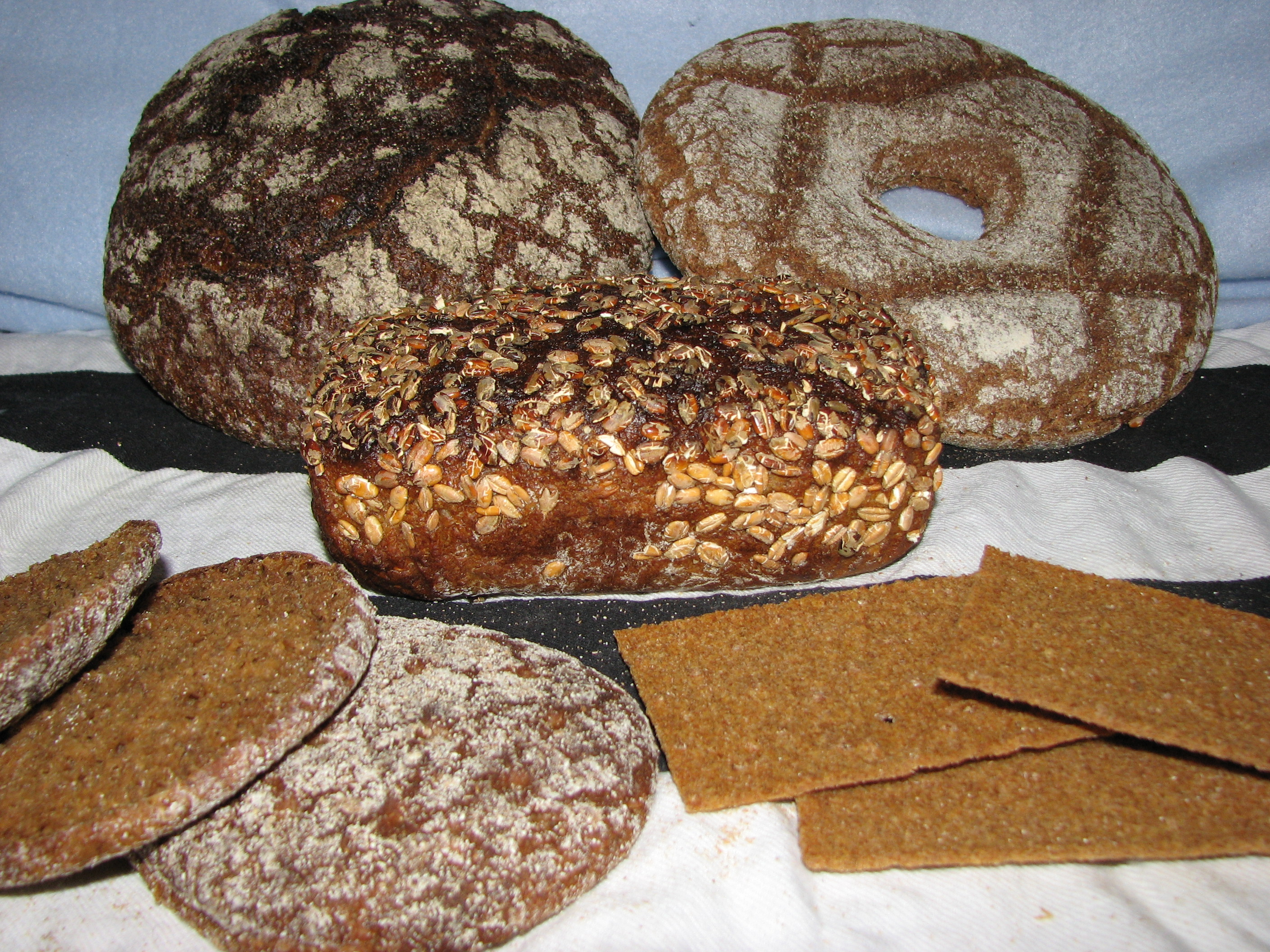
Ruisleipä, a dark sourdough rye bread, holds the status of the national food in Finland.

Finnish cuisine generally combines traditional country fare and contemporary style cooking. Potato, meat, and fish play a prominent role in traditional Finnish dishes. Finnish foods often use wholemeal products (rye, barley, oats) and berries (such as bilberries, lingonberries, cloudberries, and sea buckthorn). Milk and its derivatives like buttermilk are commonly used as food and drink. The most popular fish food in Finland is salmon.

Finland has the world's second highest per capita consumption of coffee. Milk consumption is also high, at an average of about 112 litres (25 imp gal; 30 US gal), per person, per year.

=== Public holidays ===
There are several holidays in Finland, of which perhaps the most characteristic of Finnish culture include Christmas (joulu), Midsummer (juhannus), May Day (vappu) and Independence Day (itsenäisyyspäivä). Of these, Christmas and Midsummer are special in Finland because the actual festivities take place on eves, such as Christmas Eve and Midsummer's Eve, while Christmas Day and Midsummer's Day are more consecrated to rest. Other public holidays in Finland are New Year's Day, Epiphany, Good Friday, Easter Sunday and Easter Monday, Ascension Day, All Saints' Day, and Saint Stephen's Day. All official holidays in Finland are established by Acts of Parliament.

=== Sports ===
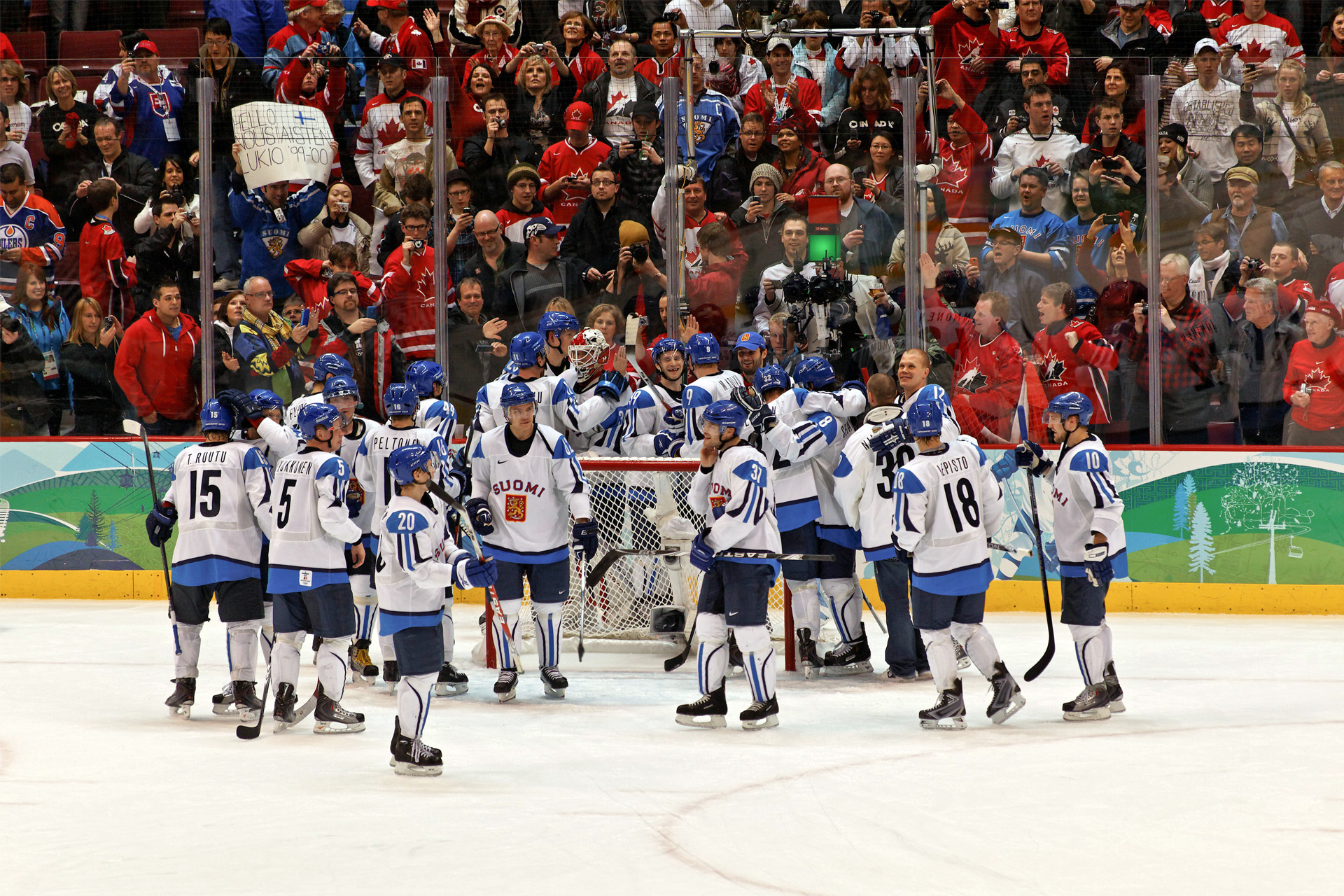
Finland's men's national ice hockey team is ranked as one of the best in the world. The team has won five world championships (1995, 2011, 2019, 2022 and 2026) and one Olympic gold medal (2022).

Various sporting events are popular in Finland. Pesäpallo, the Finnish equivalent of American baseball, is the national sport of Finland, although the most popular sport in terms of spectators is ice hockey. Other popular sports include athletics, cross-country skiing, ski jumping, football, volleyball, and basketball. Association football is the most played team sport in terms of the number of players in the country. Finland's national basketball team has received widespread public attention.

In terms of medals and gold medals won per capita, Finland is the best-performing country in Olympic history. Finland first participated as a nation in its own right at the Olympic Games in 1908. At the 1912 Summer Olympics, three gold medals were won by the original "Flying Finn" Hannes Kolehmainen. In the 1920s and '30s, Finnish long-distance runners dominated the Olympics, with Paavo Nurmi winning a total of nine Olympic gold medals and setting 22 official world records between 1921 and 1931. Nurmi is often considered the greatest Finnish sportsman and one of the greatest athletes of all time. The 1952 Summer Olympics were held in Helsinki.

The javelin throw event has brought Finland nine Olympic gold medals, five world championships, five European championships, and 24 world records. Finland also has a notable history in figure skating. Finnish skaters have won 8 world championships and 13 junior world cups in synchronized skating.

Finnish competitors have achieved significant success in motorsport. In the World Rally Championship, Finland has produced eight world champions, more than any other country. In Formula One, Finland has won the most world championships per capita, with Keke Rosberg, Mika Häkkinen and Kimi Räikkönen all having won the title.

Some of the most popular recreational sports and activities include Nordic walking, running, cycling and skiing. Floorball is the most popular youth and workplace sport.

== See also ==
- List of Finland-related topics
- Outline of Finland
