= Prime Minister's Office (Finland) =

Ministry supporting the Finnish Prime Minister and Government

- Valtioneuvoston kanslia Statsrådets kansli
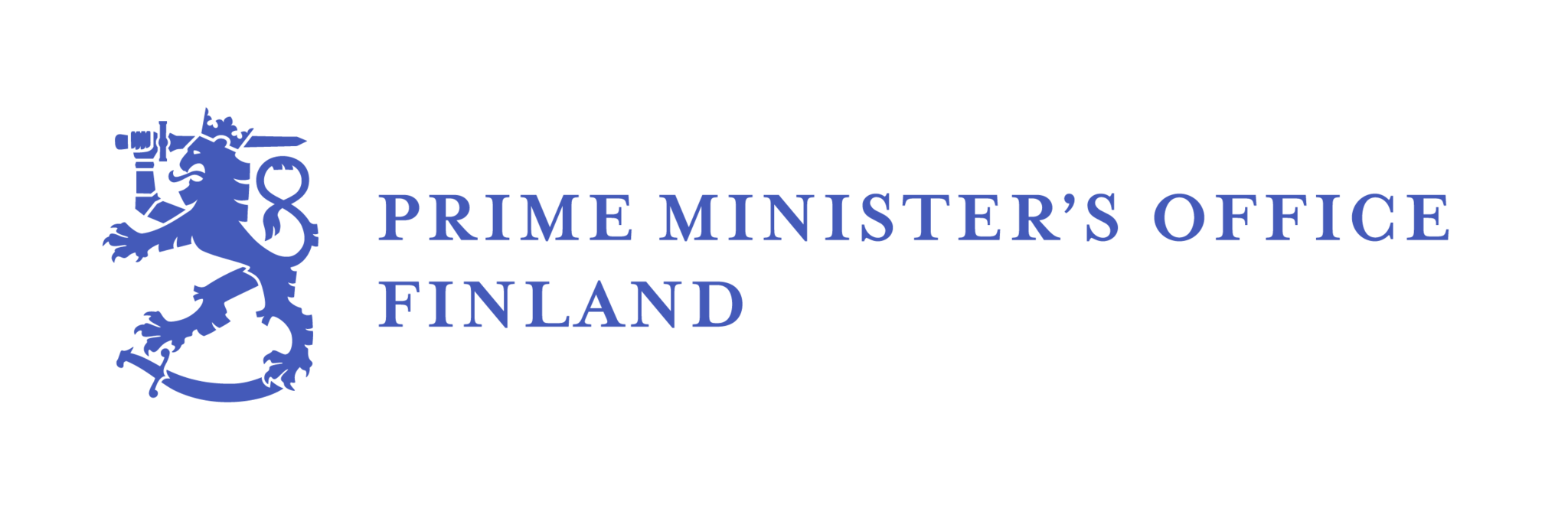

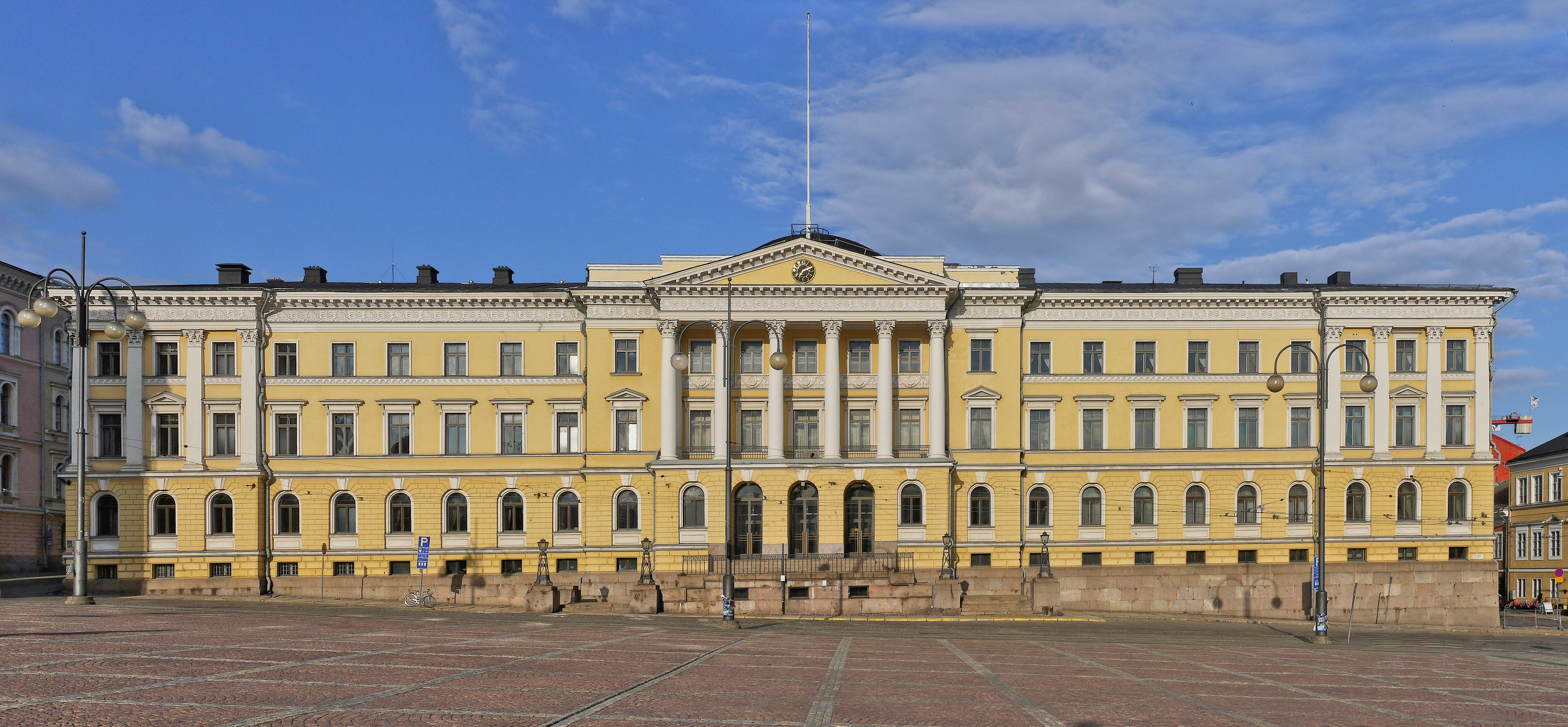
- The Prime Minister's Office is located within the Government Palace in Helsinki.

Ministry overview
- Formed: 27 November 1918; 107 years ago
- Jurisdiction: Finnish Government
- Headquarters: Government Palace; Snellmanninkatu 1 A, Helsinki, Finland
- Employees: 550
- Minister responsible: Petteri Orpo, Prime Minister
- Ministry executive: Risto Artjoki, State Secretary
- Parent department: Finnish Government
- Website: vnk.fi

The Prime Minister's Office (PMO; Finnish: Valtioneuvoston kanslia (VNK); Swedish: Statsrådets kansli; lit. 'council of state's office') is the foremost governing body of the Finnish Government and one of the twelve ministries of Finland. Tracing its roots to the 1809-established Office Administrative Department of the Grand Duchy of Finland, it is currently headed by the Prime Minister of Finland and a State Secretary and located in the Government Palace in the Kruununhaka neighbourhood of Helsinki. Its main functions are to support the Prime Minister and the Finnish Government and to oversee the enactment of government programmes.

== History ==
The Senate of Finland was founded on 18 August 1809 in the Grand Duchy of Finland when Emperor Alexander I of Russia signed a standing order on its establishment at Peterhof Palace. The Senate was initially called the Governing Council until it was renamed as the Senate in 1816. The Senate of Finland was divided into the Economic and Judicial Divisions; the Economic Division was further divided into departments, such as the Office Administrative Department (Finnish: kansliatoimituskunta; Swedish: kansliexpedition). On 1 October 1892, the Office Administrative Department was disbanded and the modern equivalent position of Prime Minister in the Senate, the Vice-Chairman of the Economic Division, was granted a support office in its place. The new unit was called the Office of the Economic Division (Finnish: talousosaston kanslia; Swedish: ekonomidepartementets expedition). Following Finnish independence in 1917, the unit was renamed as the Prime Minister's Office on 27 November 1918 with the operations and staff remaining intact.

In 1918, the newly founded PMO was one of a total of eleven ministries in Finland. There have been numerous changes to the initial list of ministries (for example, the Ministry of War became the Ministry of Defence in 1922) and the number of ministries has increased from eleven to twelve, but the overall setup remained largely similar over the years. For most of the 20th century, the politics of Finland was mainly headed by the President with far-stretching control over the country's affairs. This arrangement led to the Prime Minister's Office having little control over either Finnish Government or Parliament. In the late 1990s, governing power was shifted from the President to the Prime Minister, and as a result, to the Prime Minister's Office.

== Organization ==
As of 2023, PMO comprises some 600 staff. It is led by the Prime Minister and monitors the implementation of the Finnish Government's programmes and assists the Prime Minister in the day-to-day management of government functions through several departments and units:

Department or Unit	Tasks
European Union (EU) Affairs Department	Maintains coordination of EU policy and prepares EU affairs for the Prime Minister and the Minister for European Affairs.
Administration Department	Manages the ministries' administrative services and the internal administration of the PMO.
Ownership Steering Department	Handles affairs relating to state ownership of companies, such as drafting state ownership policy.
Communications Department	Controls the communications of both the Prime Minister and the Finnish Government.
Session Unit	Gathers expert services that relate to decisions made by the Government and the President.
Policy Analysis Unit	Produces data and publications in support of the Government's work on future, foresight and economic policy.
External Economic Relations Unit	Coordinates work done by the ministries on external economic relations.

== See also ==
- Bureaucracy
- Diet of Porvoo
- Prime minister
