= Senate Square, Helsinki =

Square in Helsinki, Finland

Coordinates: 60°10′10″N 024°57′09″E

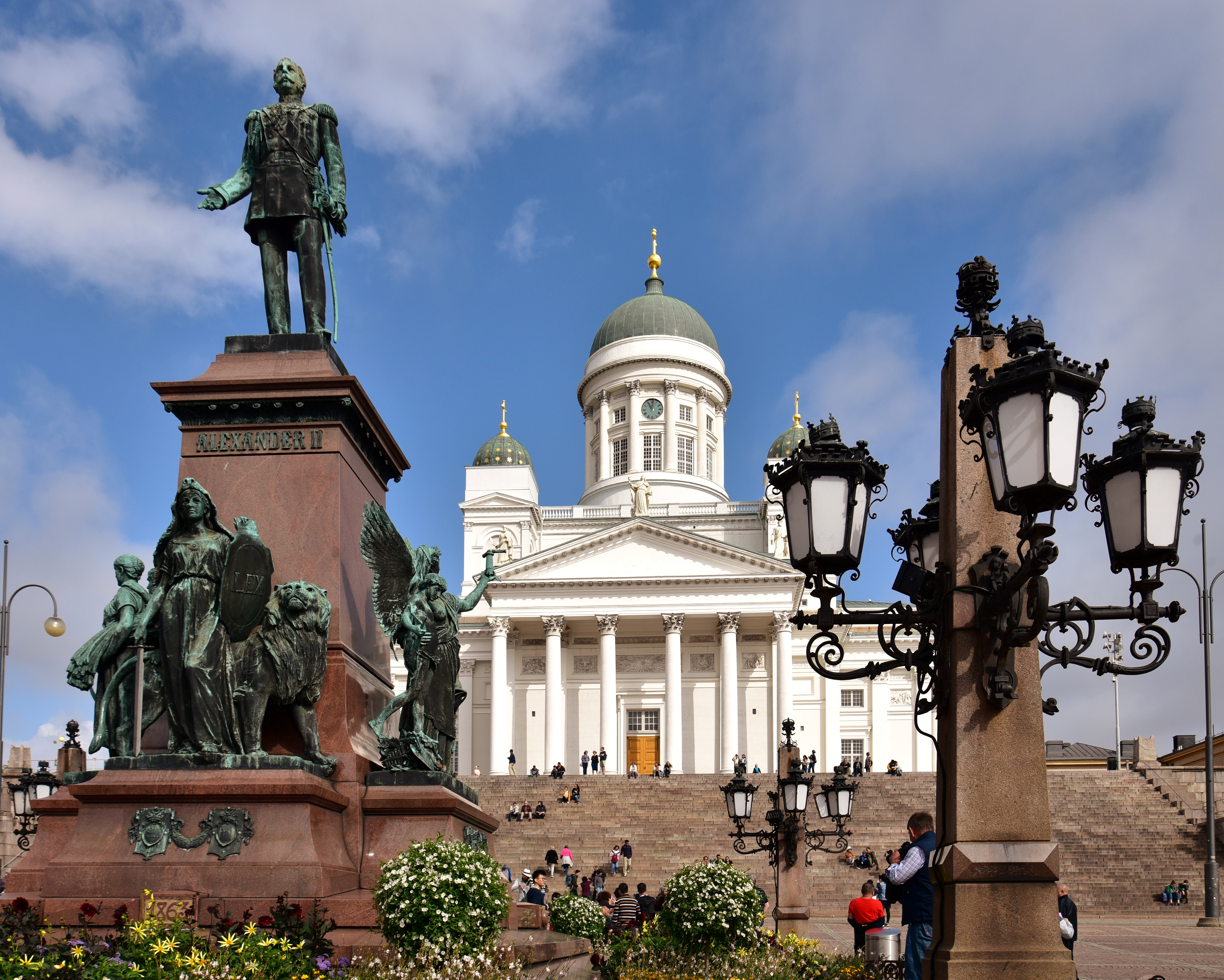
The statue of Grand Duke of Finland, Alexander II, with Helsinki Cathedral in the background.

Senate Square (Finnish: Senaatintori, Swedish: Senatstorget) presents Carl Ludvig Engel's architecture as a unique allegory of political, religious, scientific and commercial powers in the centre of Helsinki, Finland.

Senate Square and its surroundings make up the oldest part of central Helsinki. Landmarks and famous buildings surrounding the square are the Helsinki Cathedral, the Government Palace, the main building of the University of Helsinki and merchant Johan Sederholm's the Sederholm House, the oldest building of central Helsinki dating from 1757.

== Construction ==
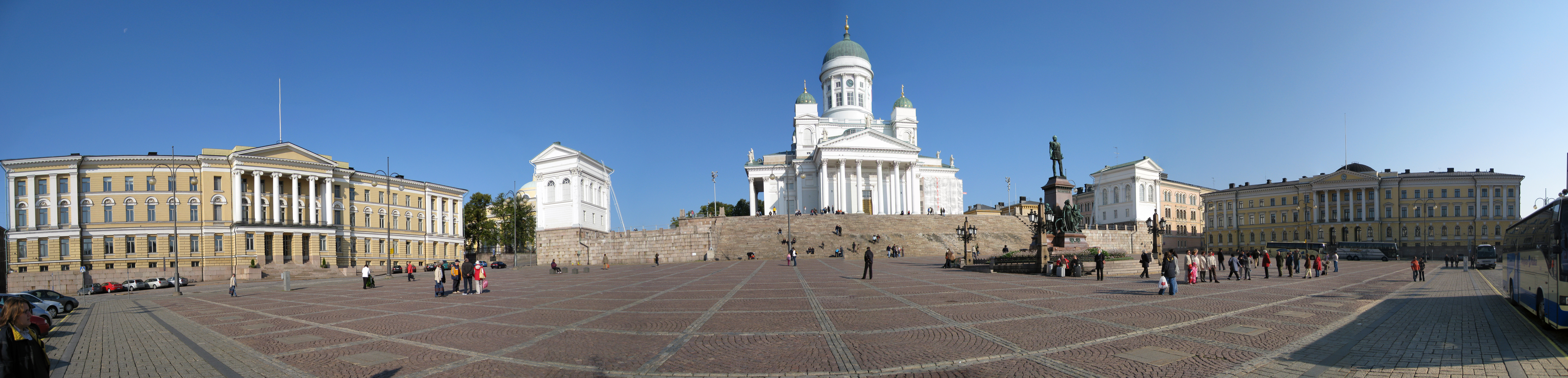
Panorama of Senate Square, Helsinki. From left: the main building of the University of Helsinki, Helsinki Cathedral and the Government Palace. The statue of Alexander II is at the center.

In the 17th and 18th-centuries, the west side was the location of a church and a graveyard.

In 1812, Senate Square was designated as the main square for the new capital of Helsinki in the city plan designed by Johan Albrecht Ehrenström. The Palace of the Council of State (or Government Palace) was completed on the eastern side of Senate Square in 1822. It served as the seat of the Senate of Finland until it was replaced by the Council of State in 1918, and now houses the offices of the Prime Minister of Finland and the cabinet. The main University building, on the opposite side of Senate Square, was constructed in 1832.

Helsinki Cathedral, on the northern edge of Senate Square, was Engel's lengthiest architectural project. He worked on it from 1818 until his death in 1840. The Cathedral — then called the Church of St. Nicholas — dominates Senate Square, and was finalized in 1852, twelve years after Engel's death.

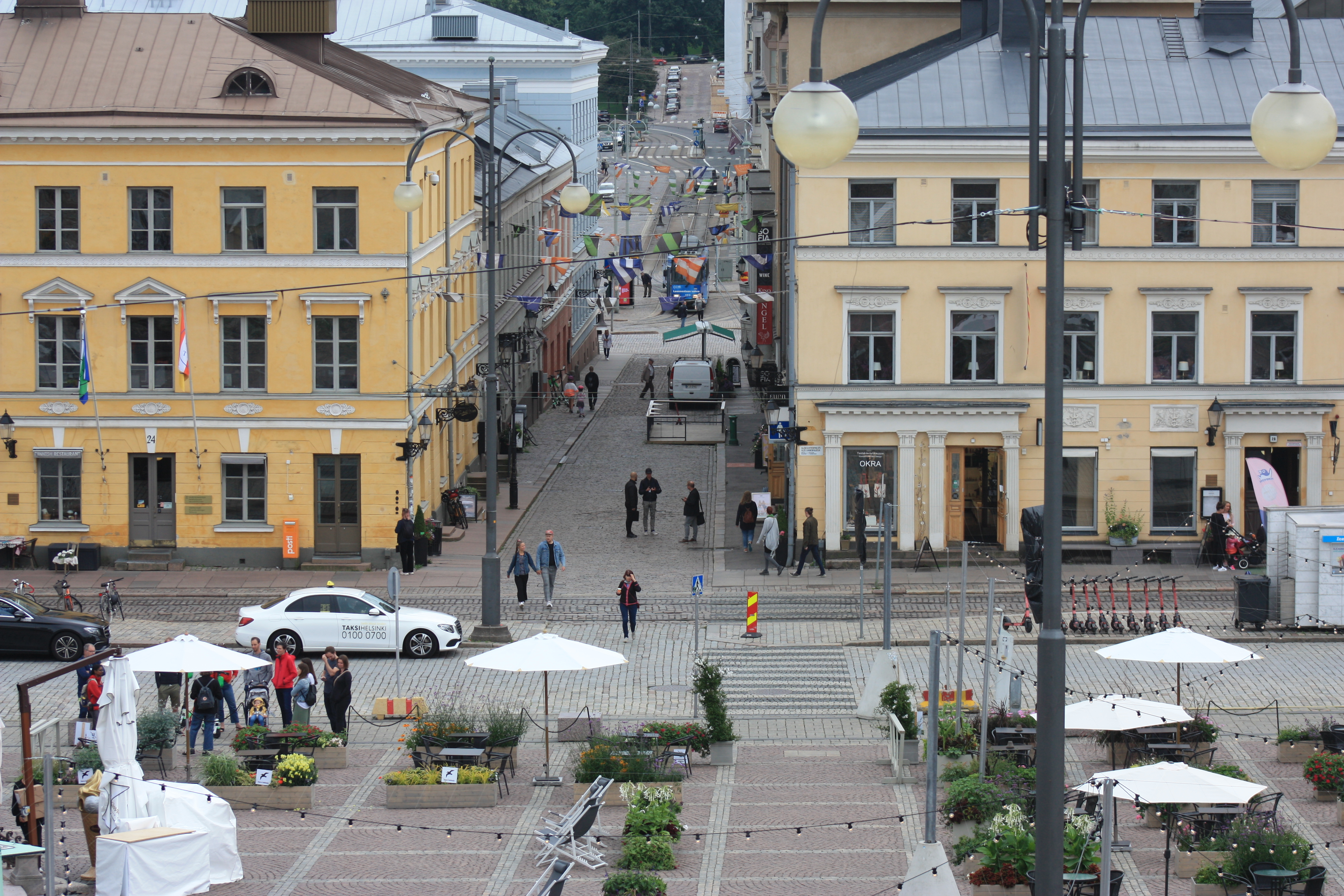
Views of Senate Square.

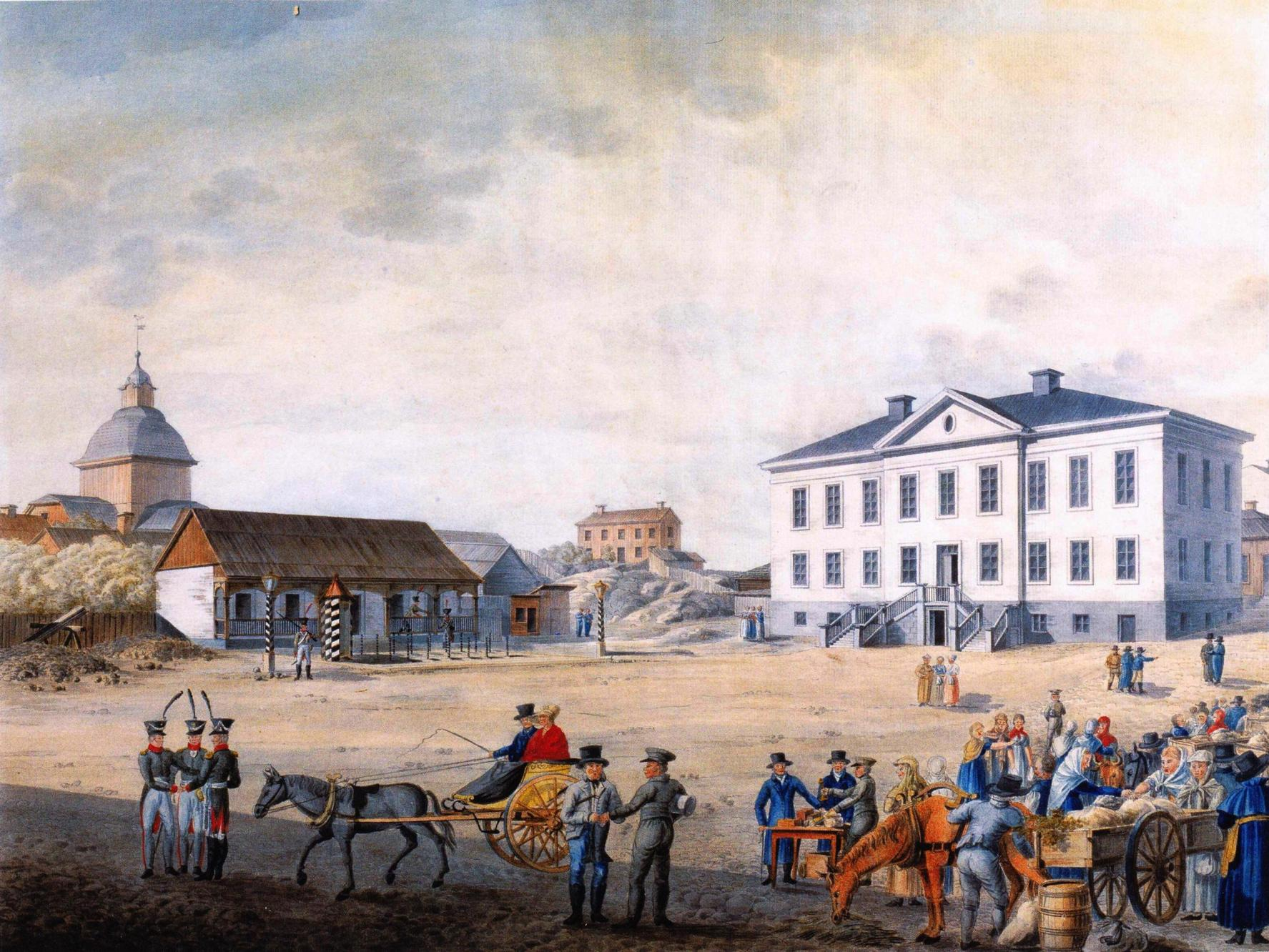
Engel's 1816–1818 watercolor painting of the old square that was located at the southeast part of the current square. On the right is the town hall and on the left the guard house, behind which is the old Ulrika Eleonora church.

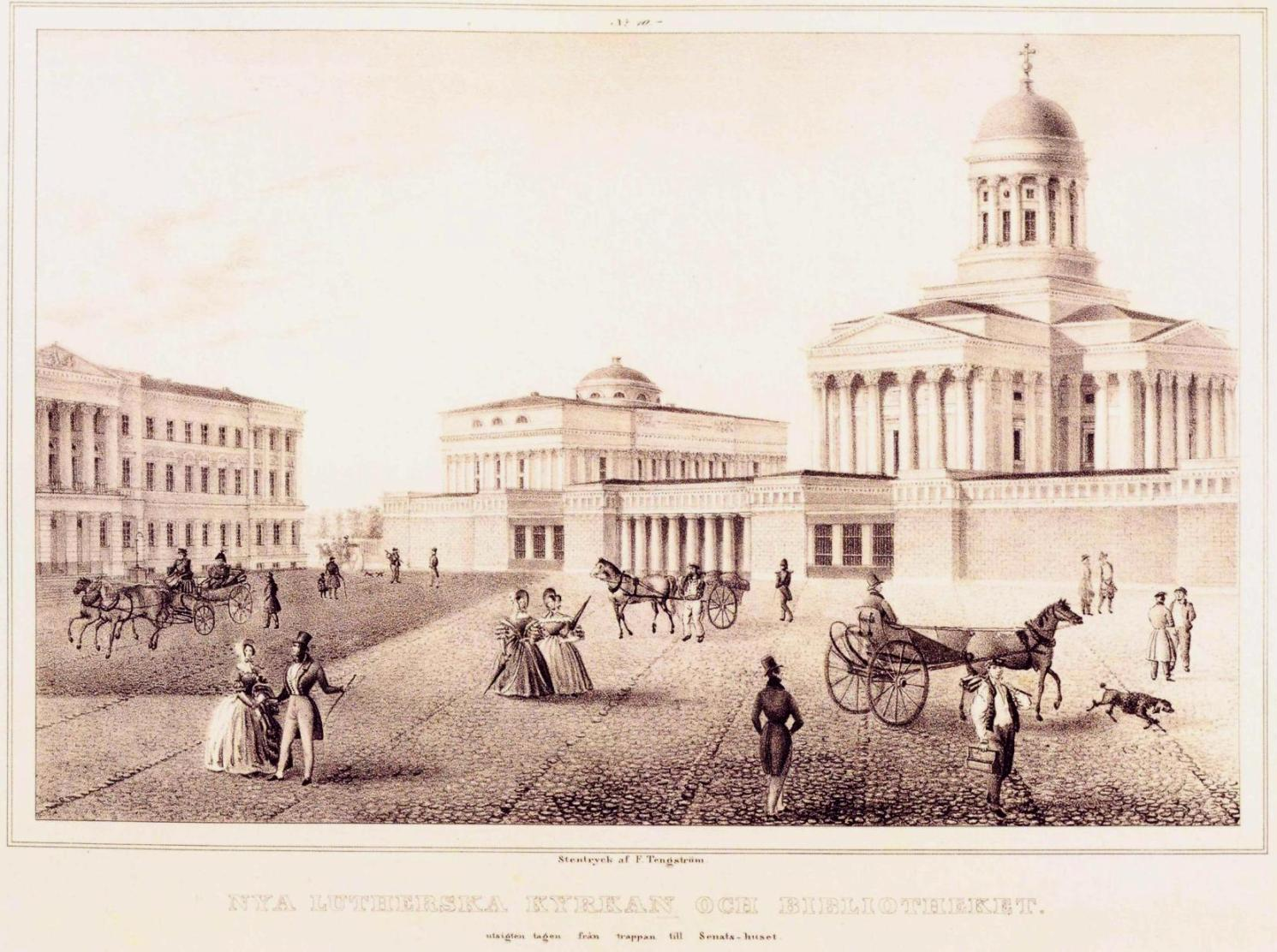
Lithograph of the square from 1838. The guard building in front of the cathedral was demolished in the 1840s and replaced with the large steps.

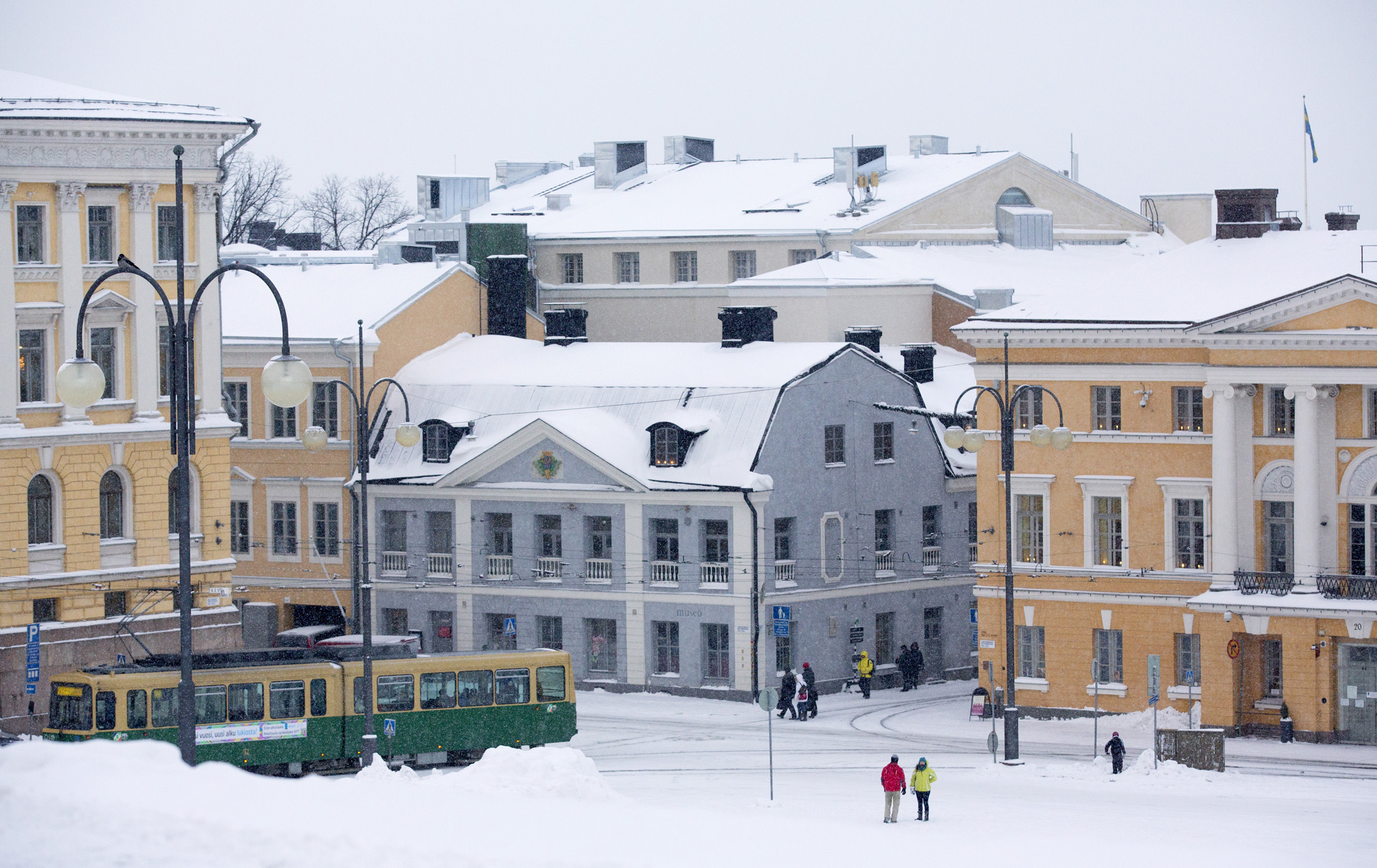
Sederholm House, 1757, the oldest building of central Helsinki at the southeast corner of the square

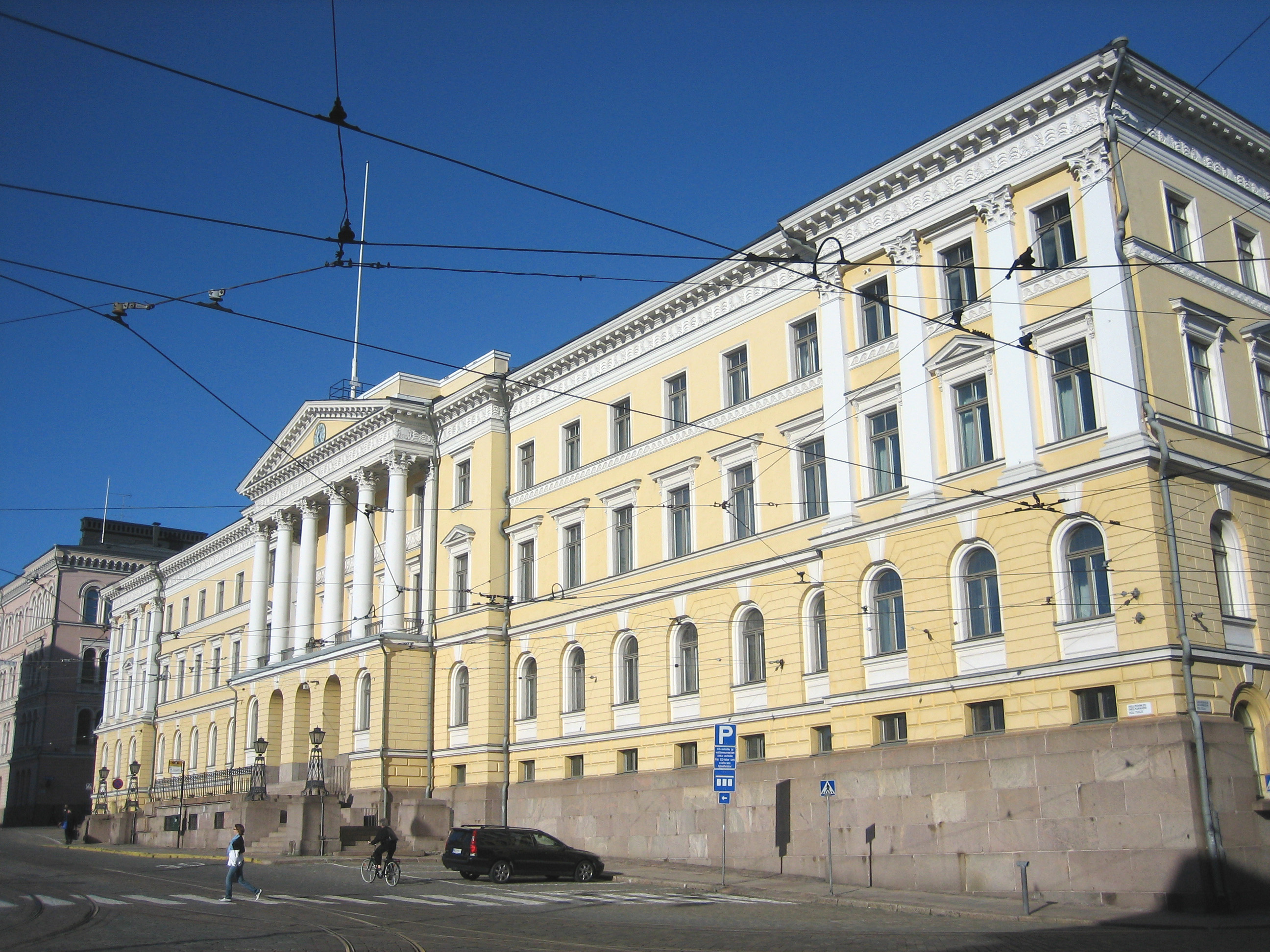
Government Palace, 1822

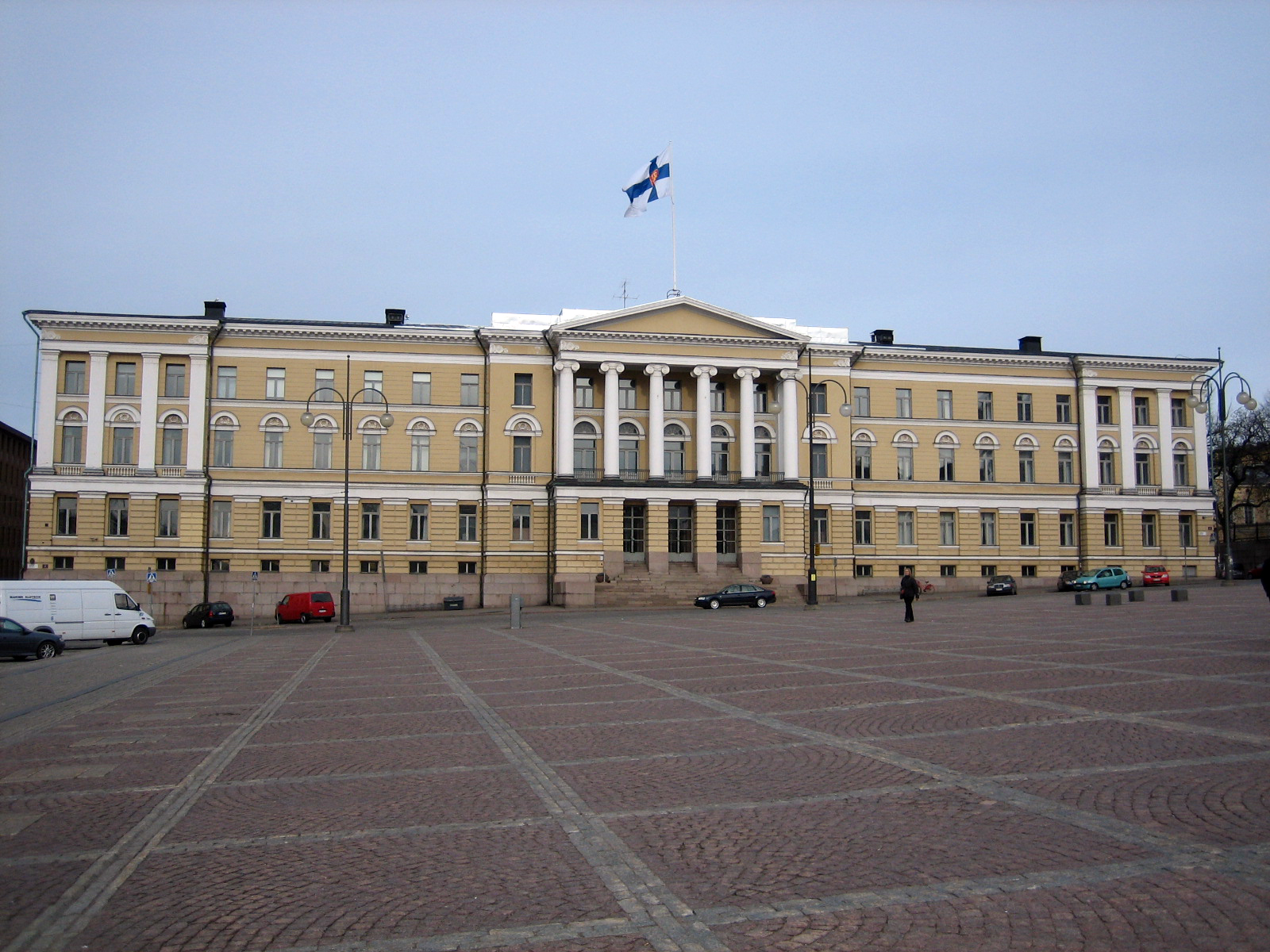
Main Building of University of Helsinki, 1832, in its current façade

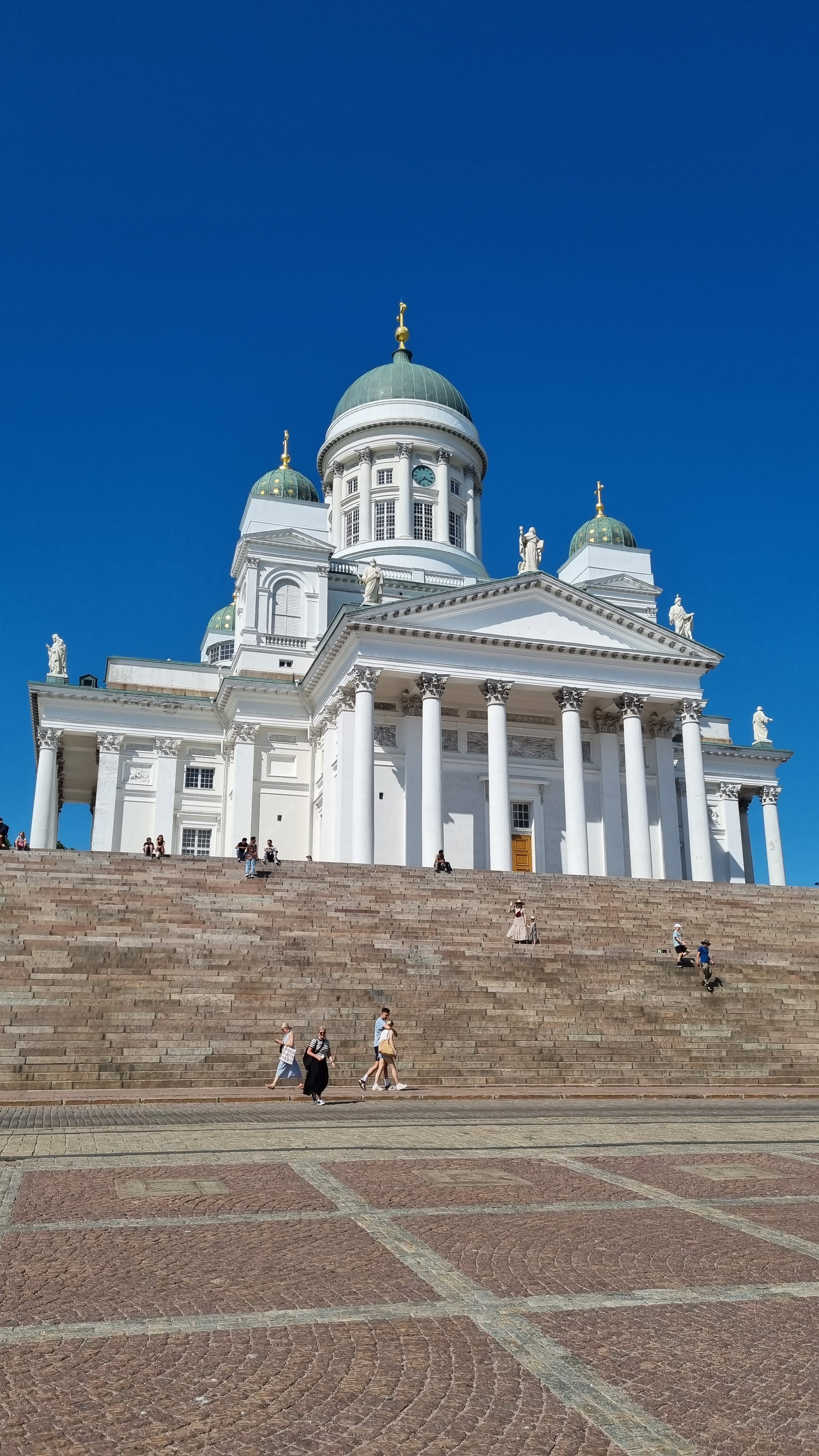
Helsinki Cathedral, 1830–1852

== Statue of Alexander II ==
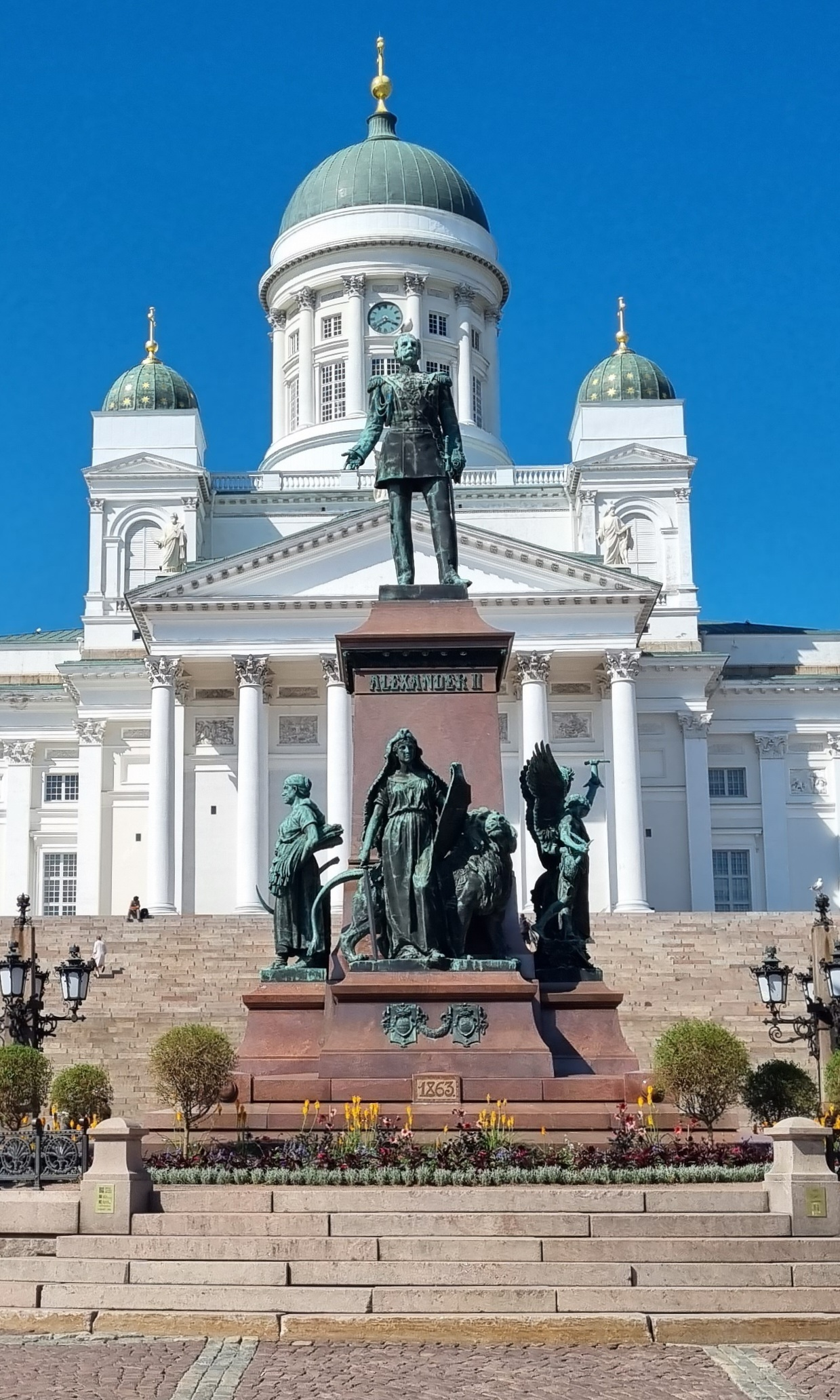
Statue of Alexander II in front of Helsinki Cathedral.

A statue of Emperor Alexander II is located in the center of the square. The statue, erected in 1894, was built to commemorate his re-establishment of the Diet of Finland in 1863 as well as his initiation of several reforms that increased Finland's autonomy from the Russian Empire's rule. The statue comprises Alexander on a pedestal surrounded by figures representing law, culture, and peasants. The sculptor was Walter Runeberg.

During the trials of Russification of Finland between 1899 and 1917, the statue became a symbol of quiet resistance, with people protesting against the decrees of Nicholas II by leaving flowers at the foot of the statue of his grandfather, then known in Finland as "the good tsar".

After Finland's full independence declaration in 1917, demands were made to remove the statue. Later, it was suggested to replace it with the equestrian statue of Mannerheim currently located on Mannerheimintie in front of the Kiasma museum. Nothing came of either of these suggestions, and today the statue is one of the major tourist landmarks of the city and a reminder of the role of Alexander II in establishing Finnish statehood for the first time in history.

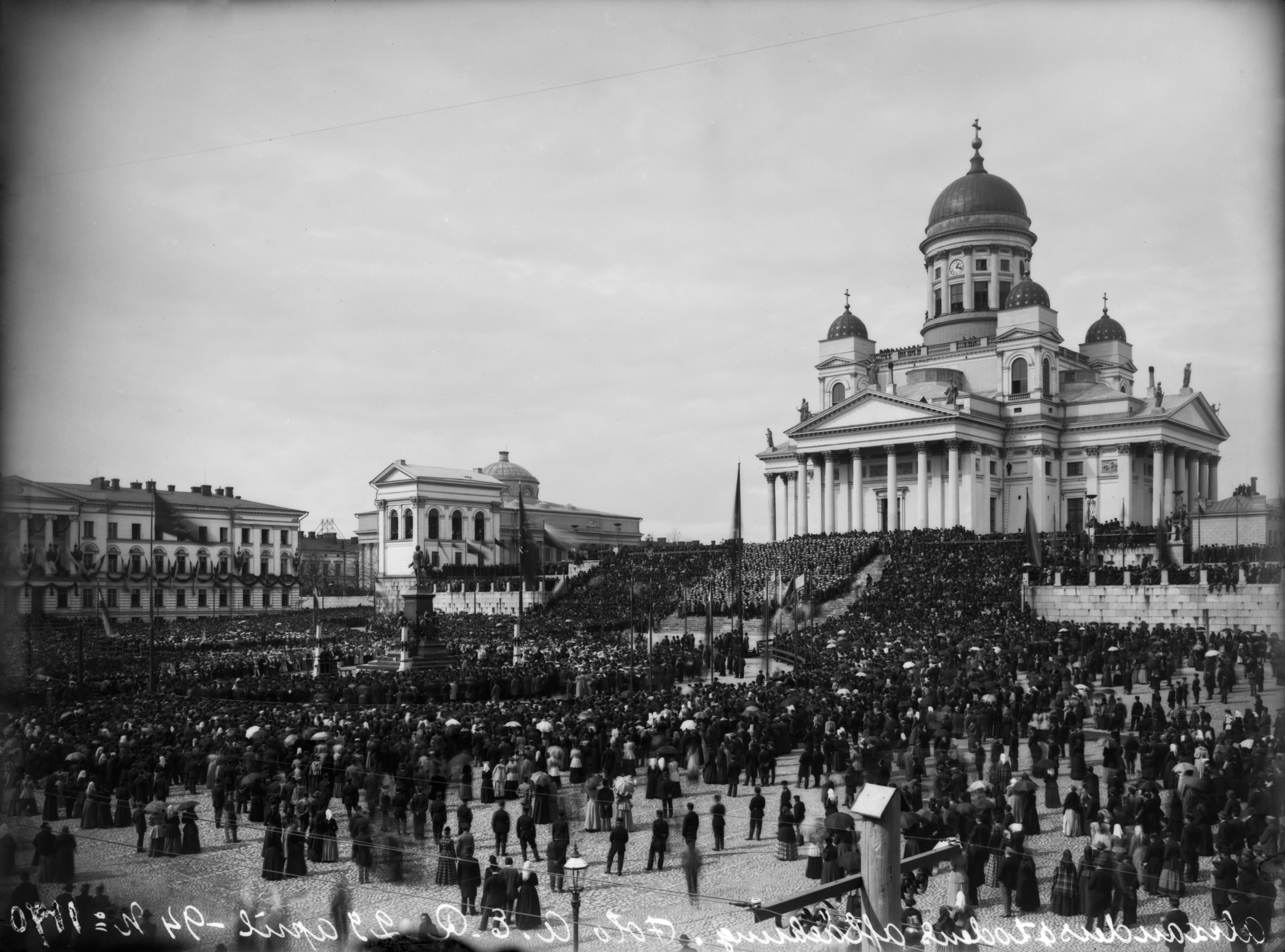
Reveal of the statue of Alexander II, 29 April 1894

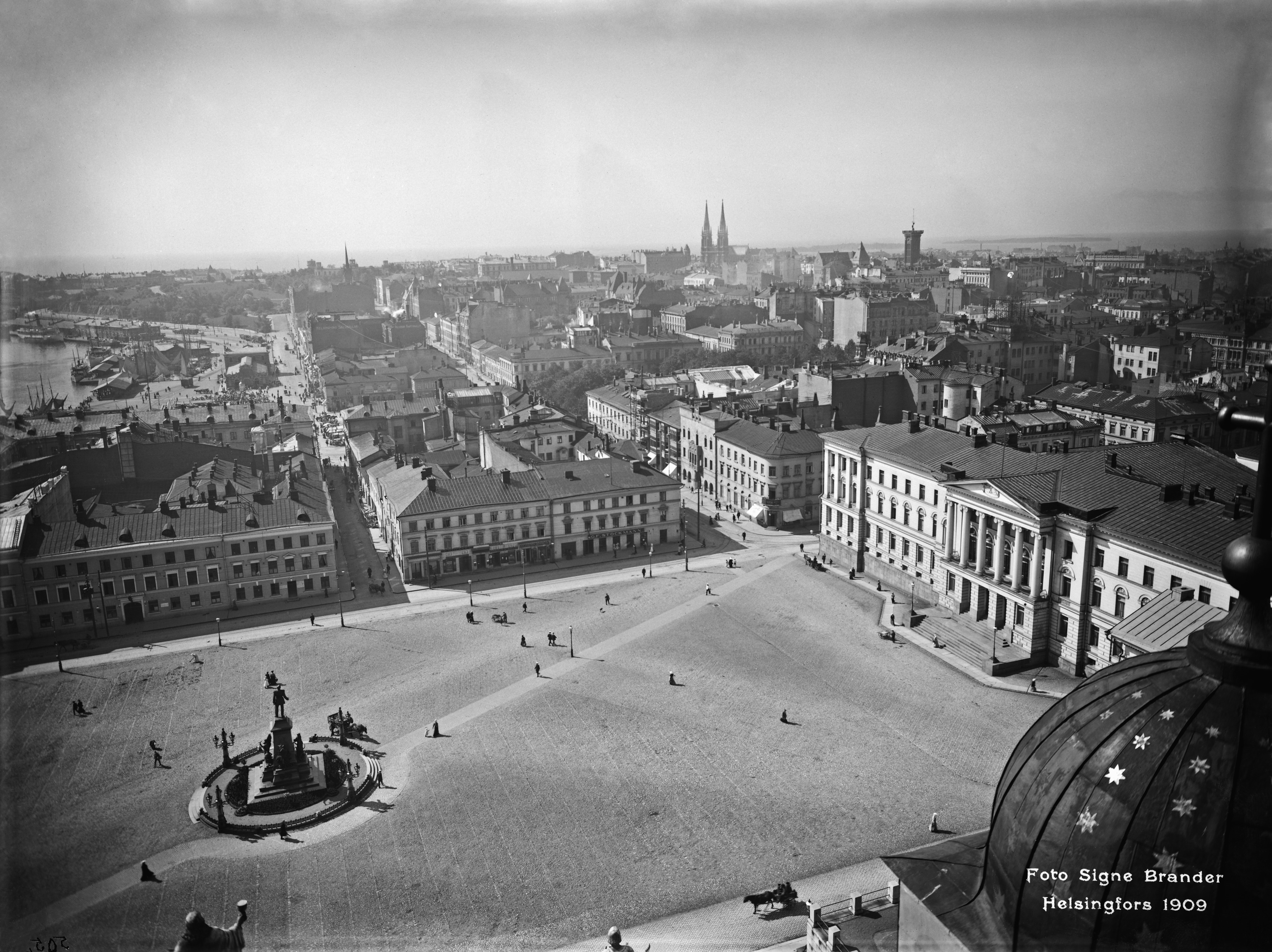
View from the tower of the cathedral towards southwest in 1909

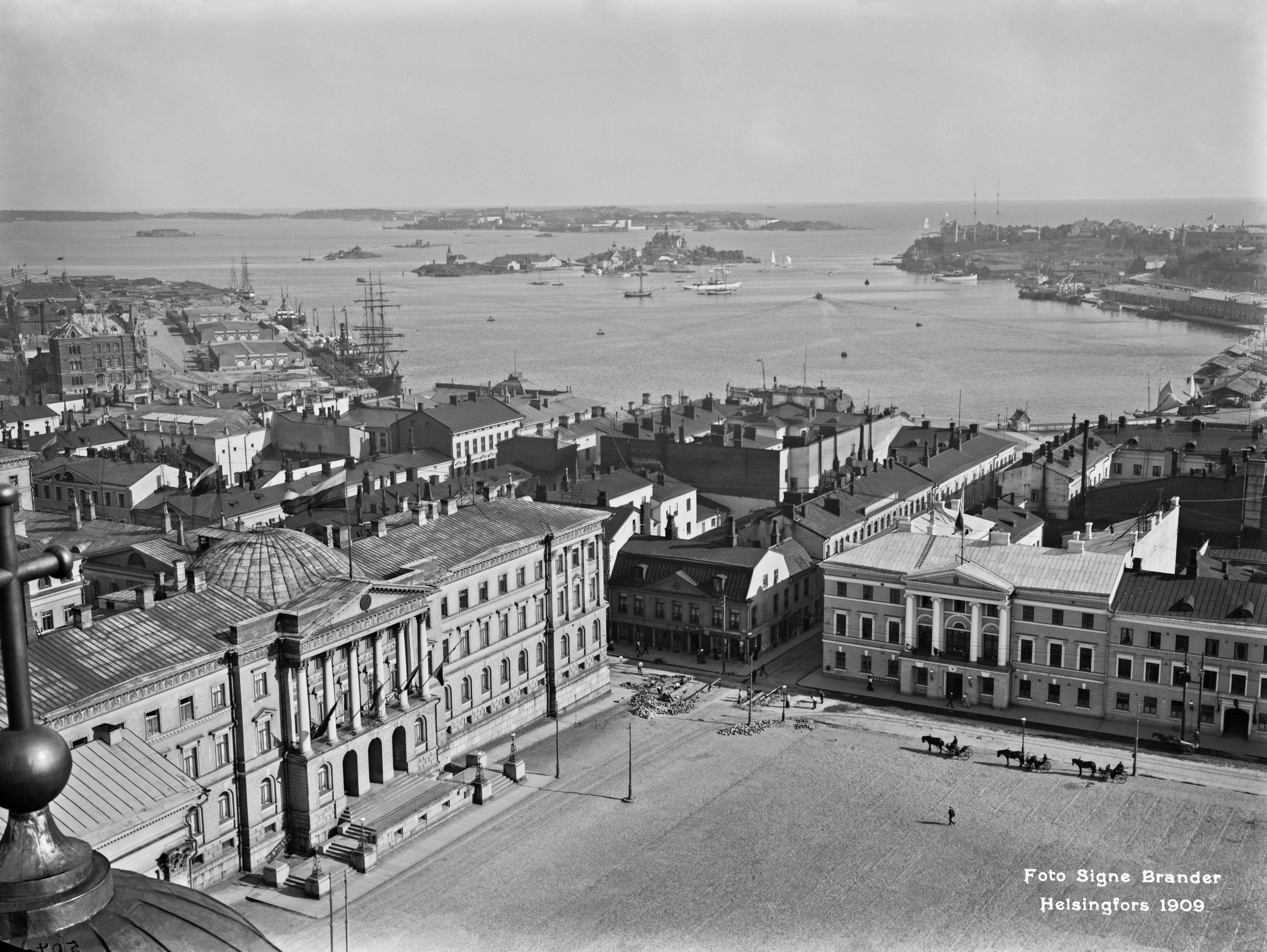
View to the southeast in 1909

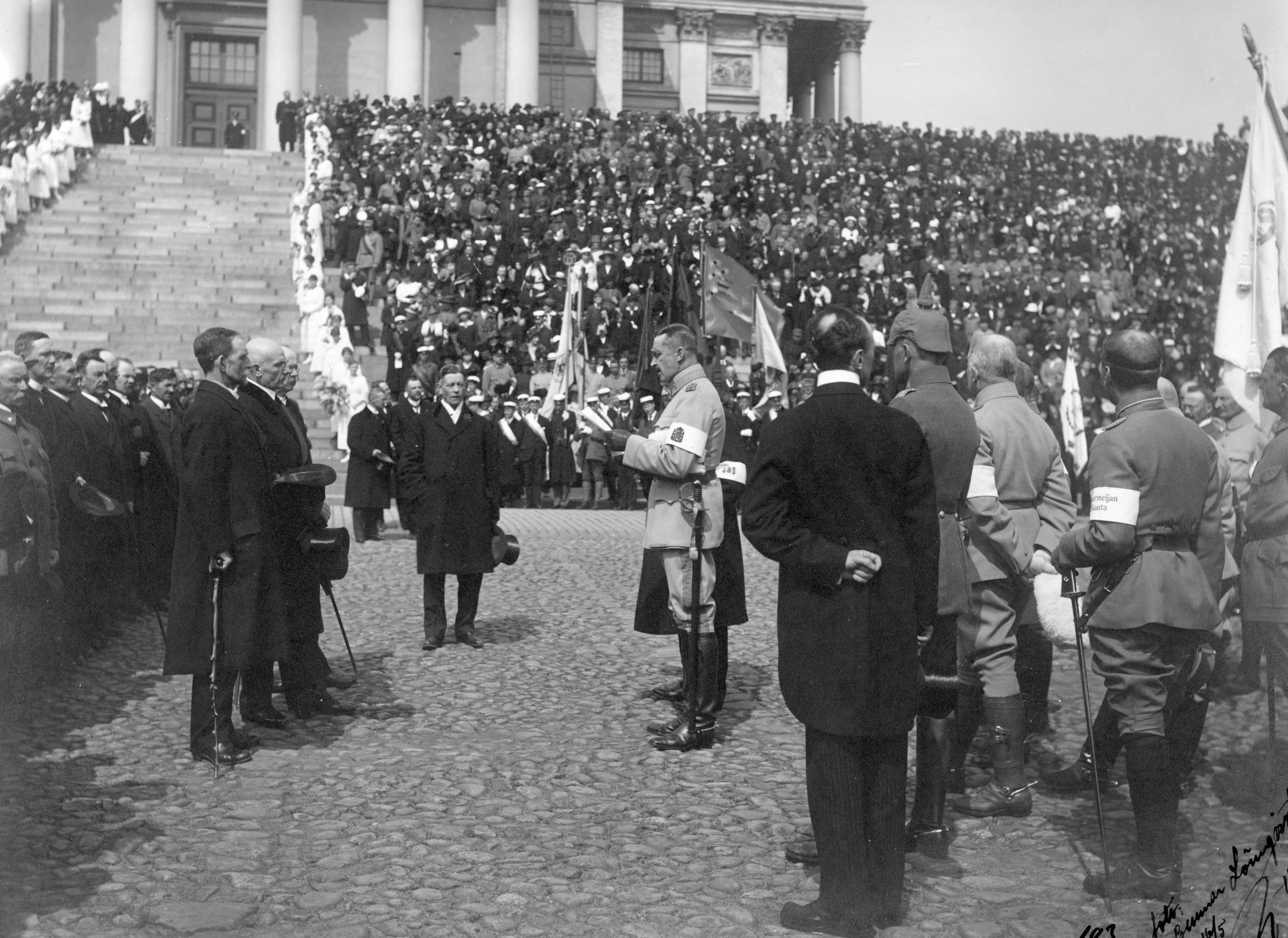
Parade of the White Guard on 16 May 1918 after the Battle of Helsinki

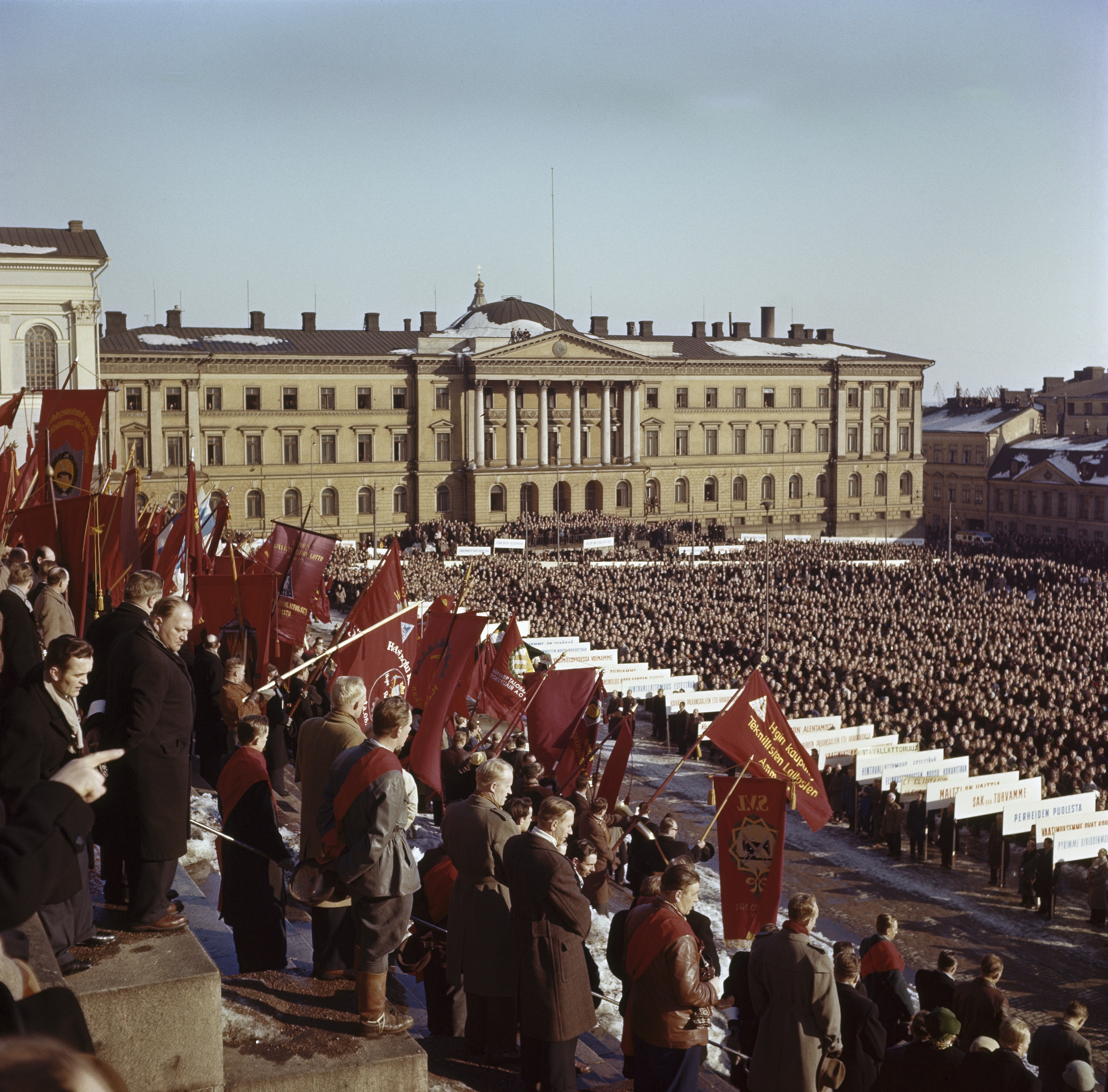
Demonstration by the unions at the square during a general strike in 1956

== Contemporary role ==
Today, Senate Square is one of the main tourist attractions of Helsinki. Various art events, ranging from concerts, snow buildings to controversial snow boarding activities, have been set up on Senate Square. In Autumn 2010, a United Buddy Bears exhibition with 142 bears was displayed on the historic square.

Digital carillon music (Finnish: Senaatintorin ääni) is played daily at 17:49 at Senate Square. The sound installation was composed by Harri Viitanen, composer and organist of Helsinki Cathedral, and Jyrki Alakuijala, Doctor of Technology. The optimal listening position is at the proximity of the square's central monument, the bronze statue of Alexander II.

Several buildings near Senate Square are managed by the government real estate provider, Senate Properties. At the northwest corner there are four short pillars erected each winter to protect the memorial plate of the Ulrika Eleonora church from snow plows.

The site aspires to be designated as a World Heritage Site, but a single building in its southwest corner prevents it.

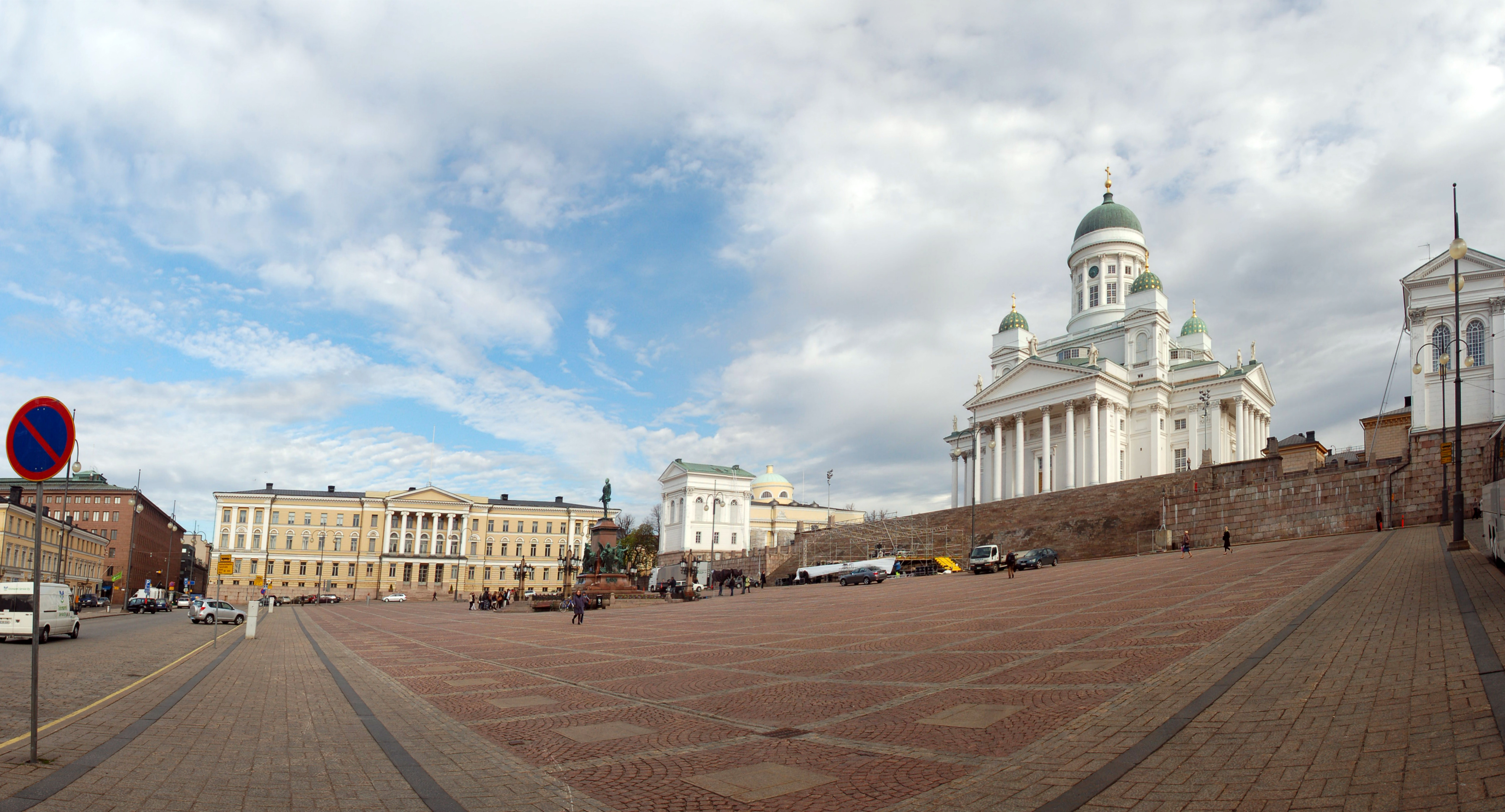
The red building on the left breaks the architectural style of the square

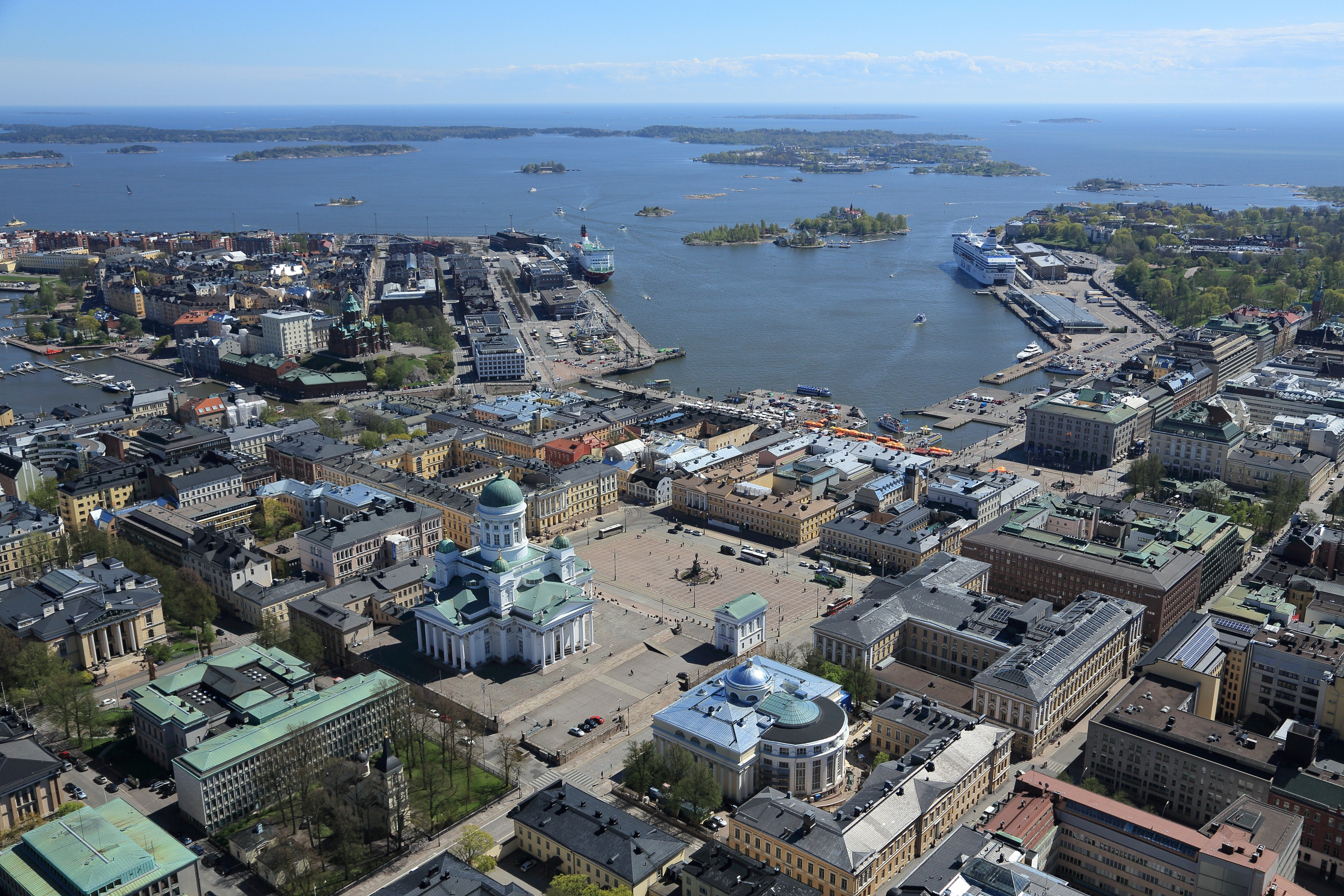
Aerial photograph of the square towards the sea in 2015

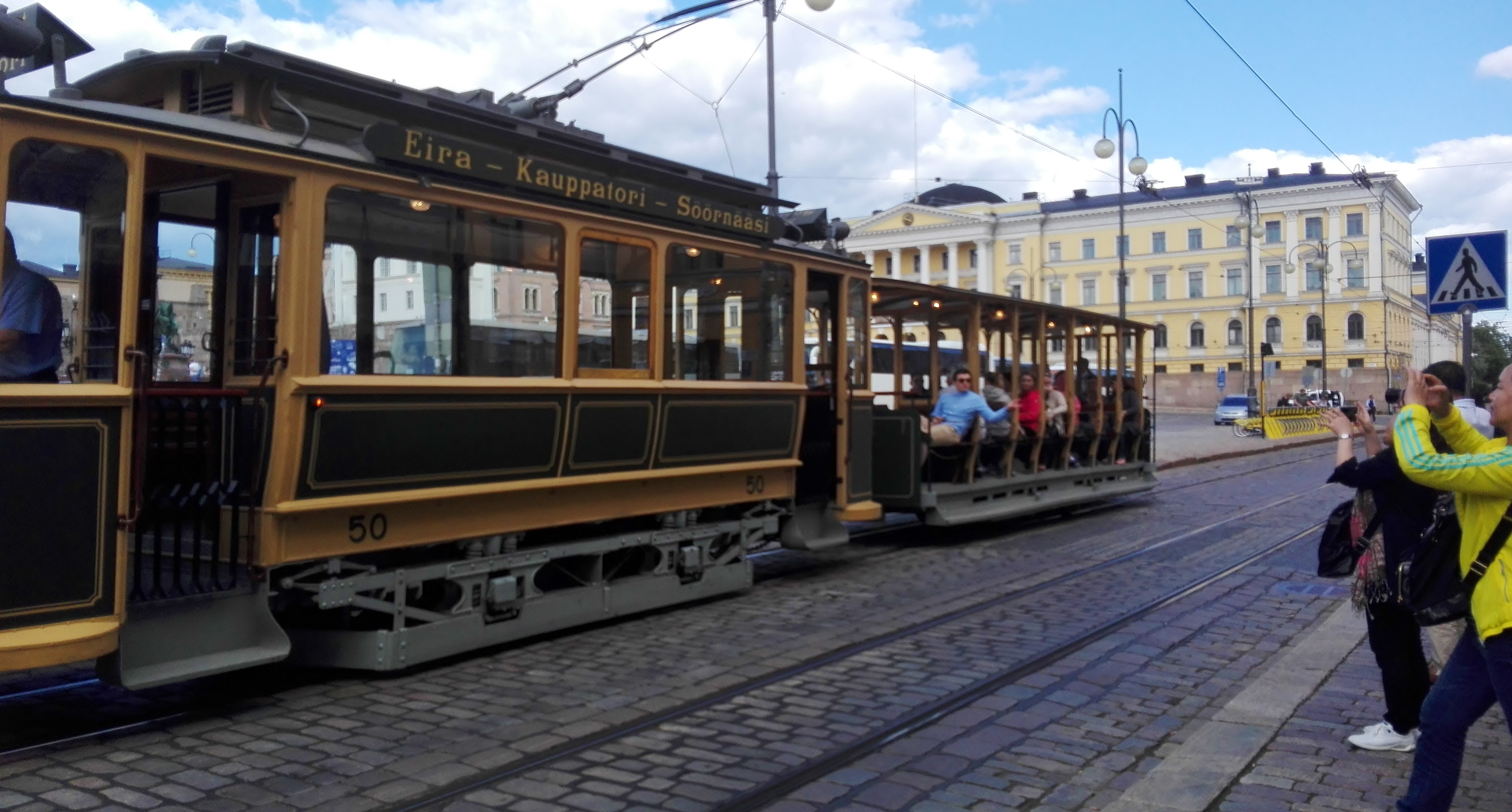
Trams travel on the eastern and southern sides of the square, and in this photograph special older models are being used

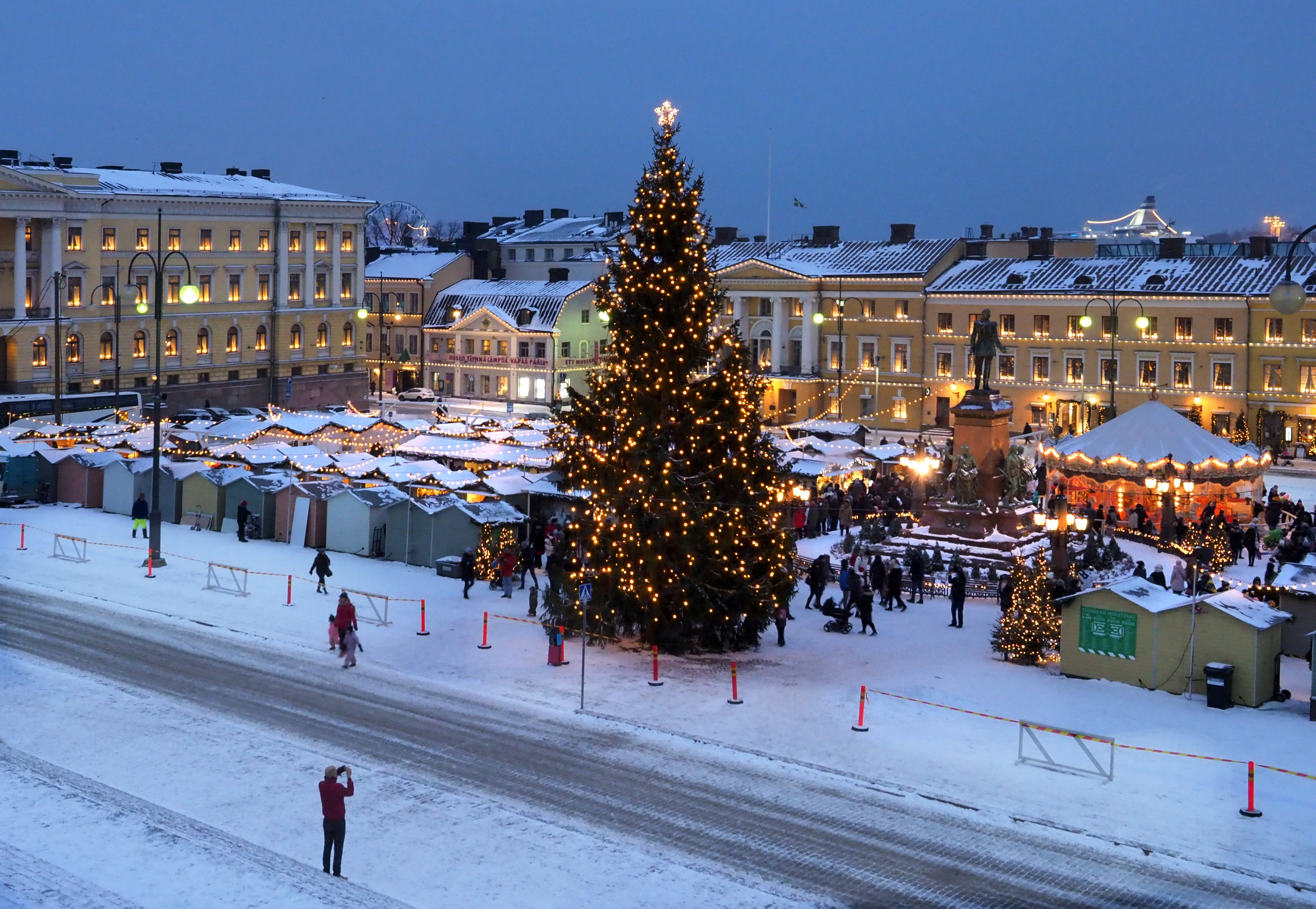
Each year The Helsinki Christmas Market (Tuomaan Markkinat) is held in December

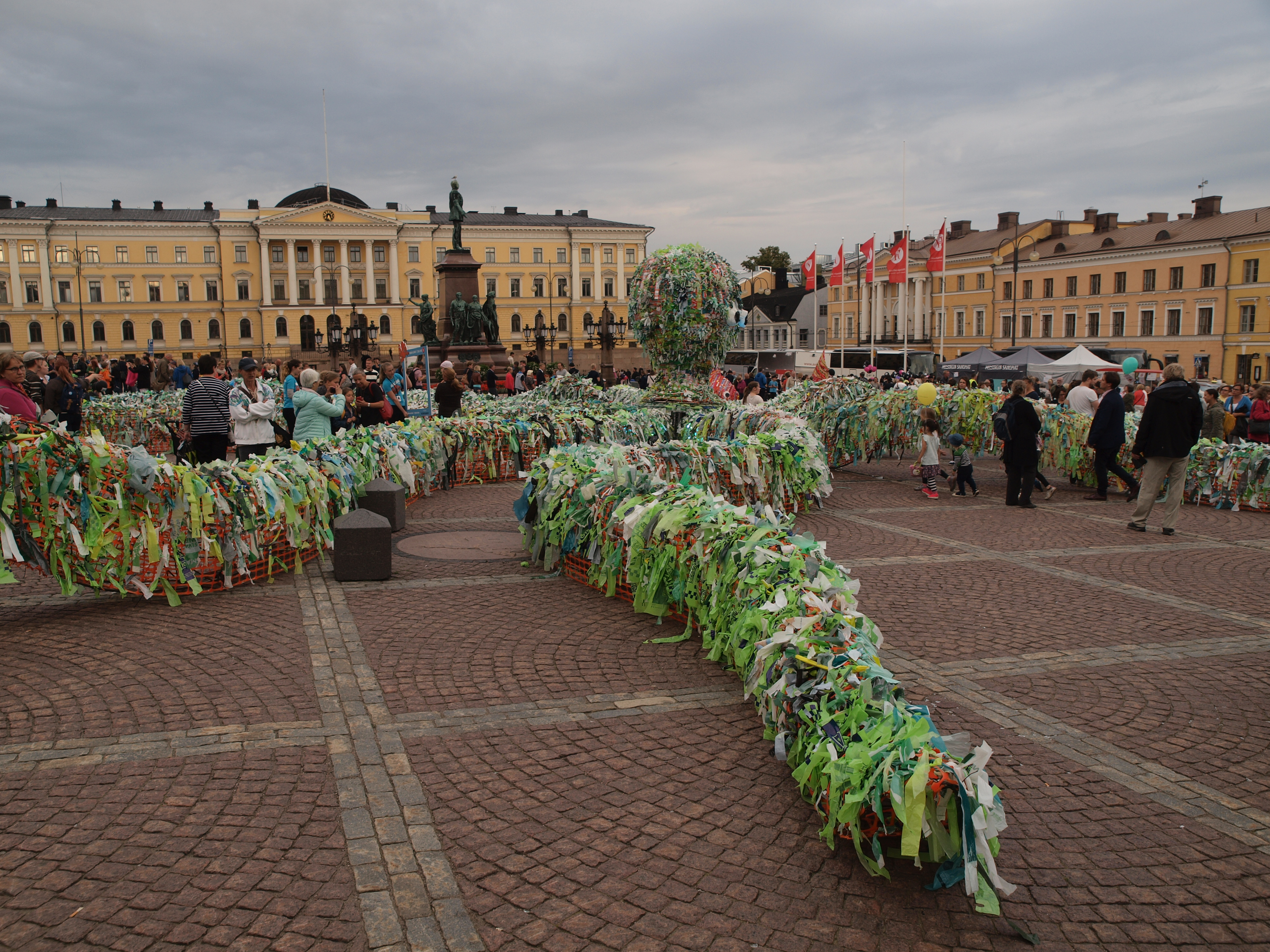
The square is often a spot for artworks and events like this environmental-awareness raising plastic bag octopus during Helsinki Night of the Arts 2016

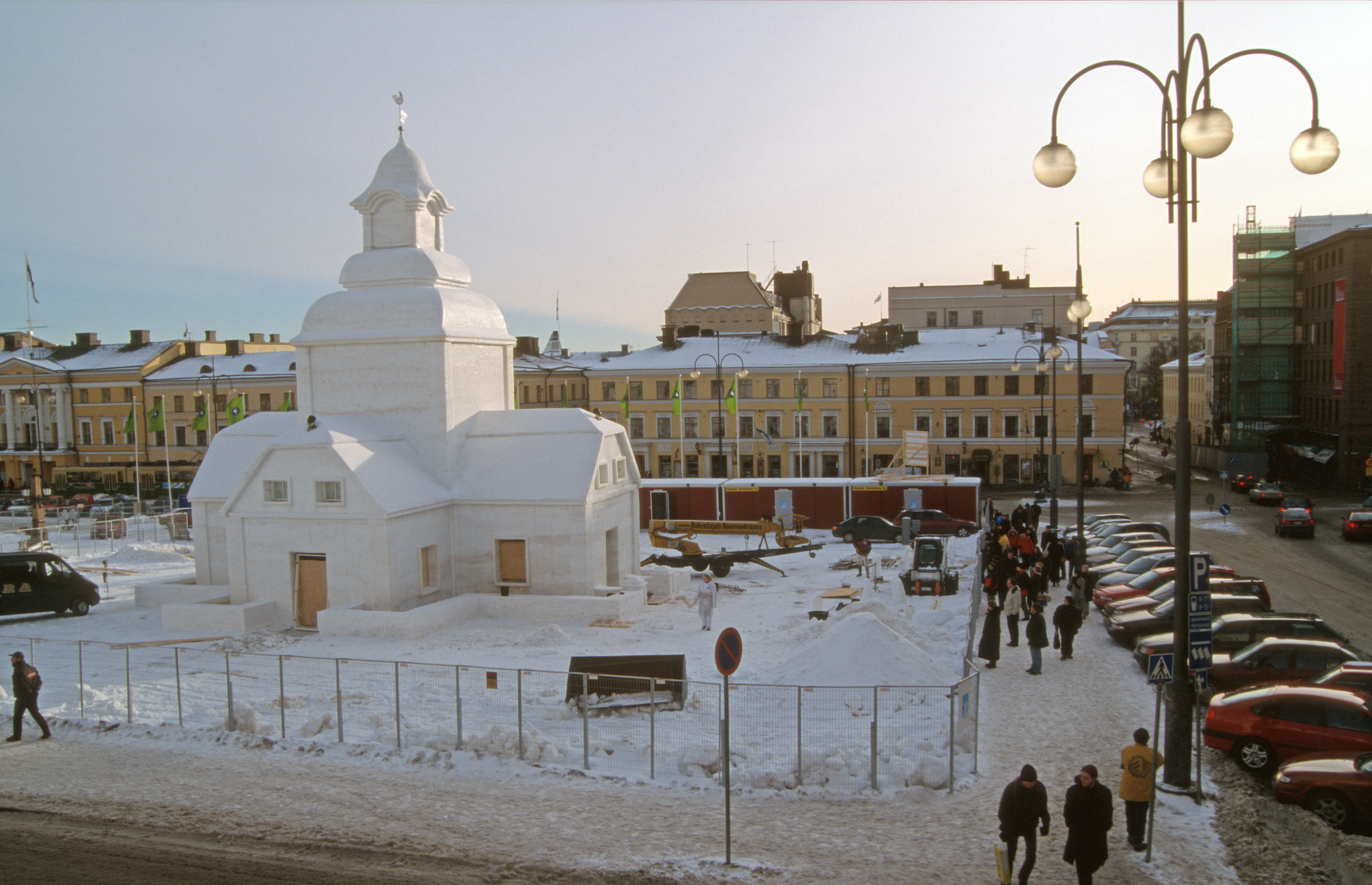
Snow sculpture version of the old Ulrika Eleonora Church being constructed on the square in 2000 (also done once before in 1997)

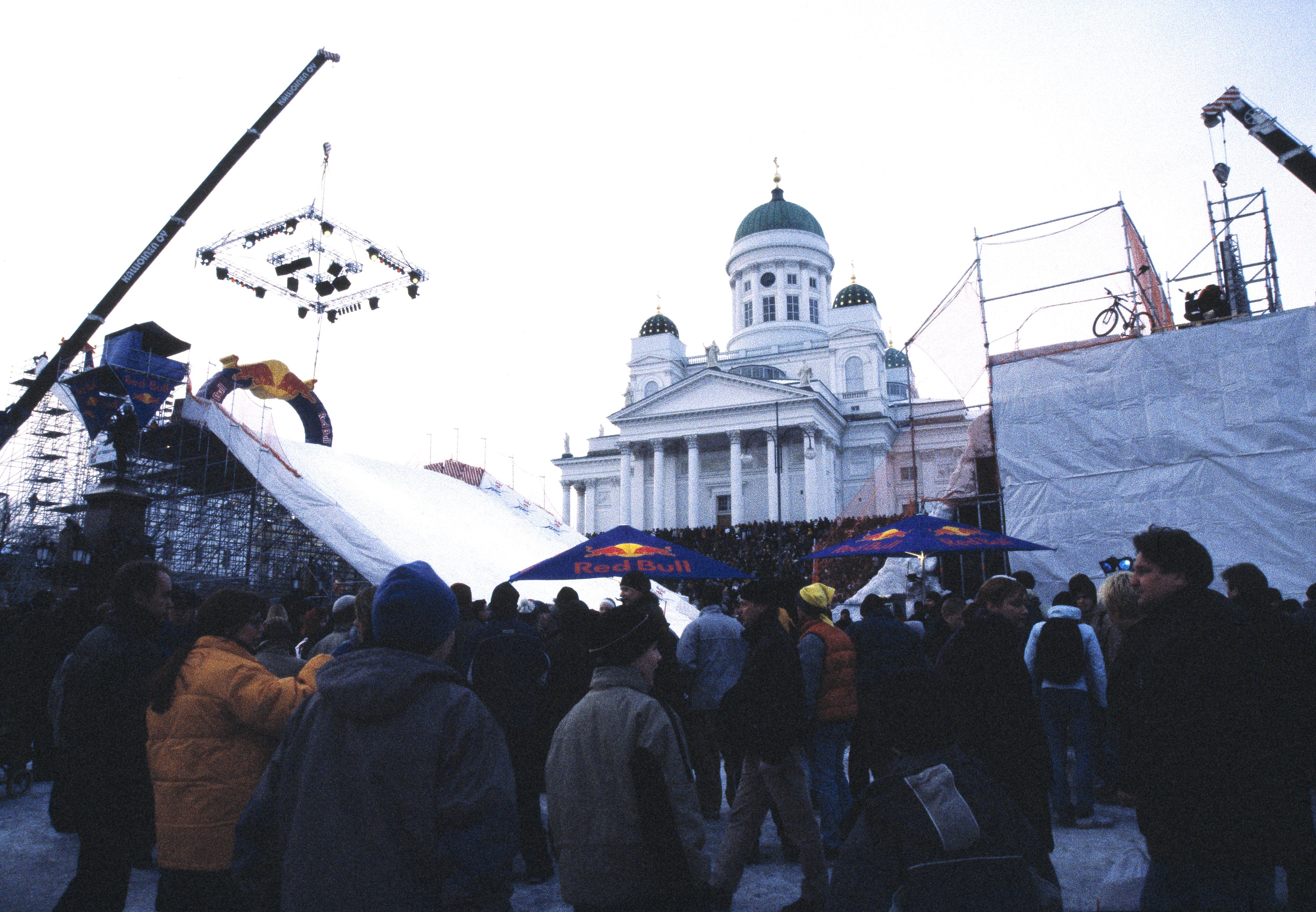
Red Bull City Flight snowboarding event at the square in 2001

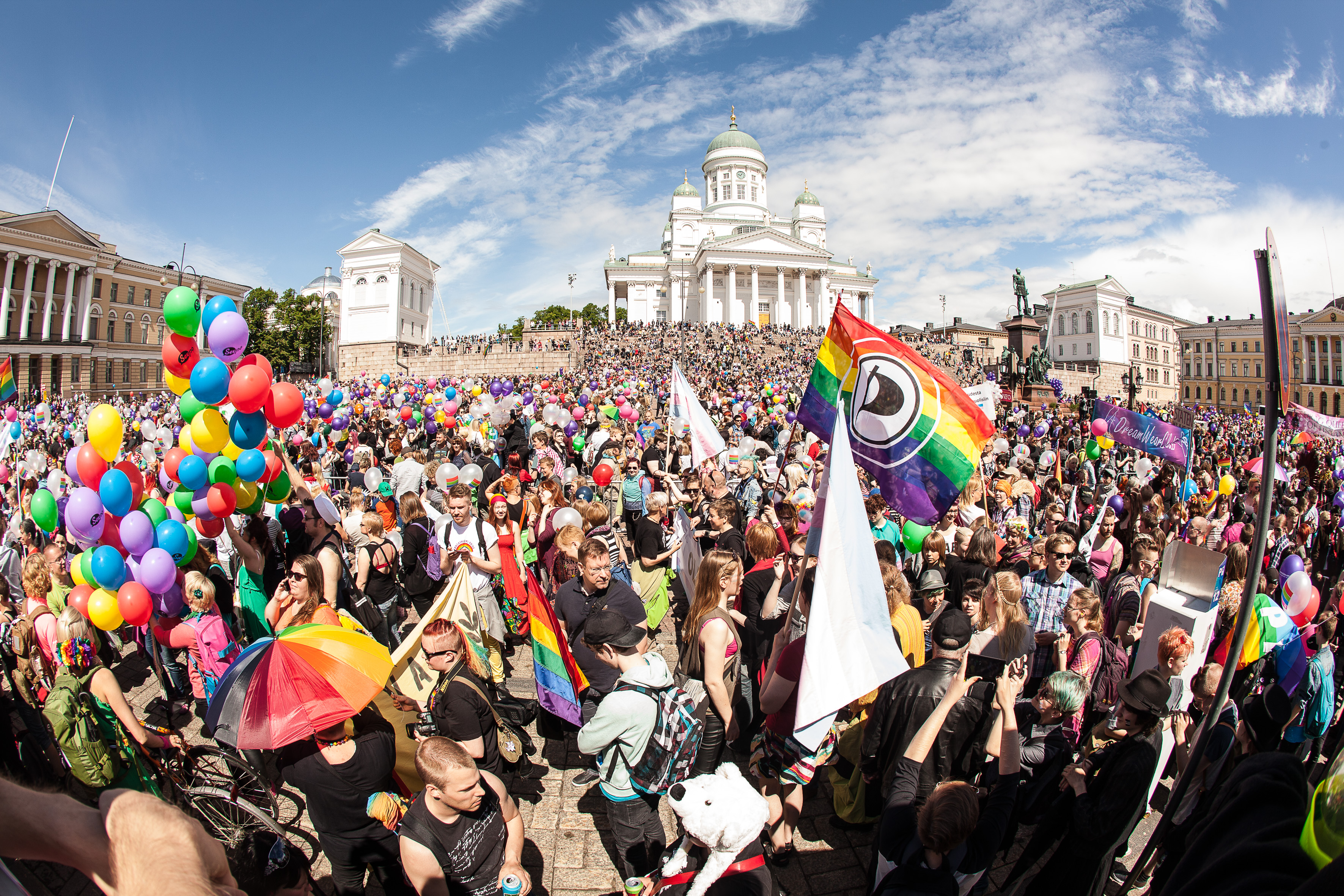
Helsinki Pride parade at the square in 2015

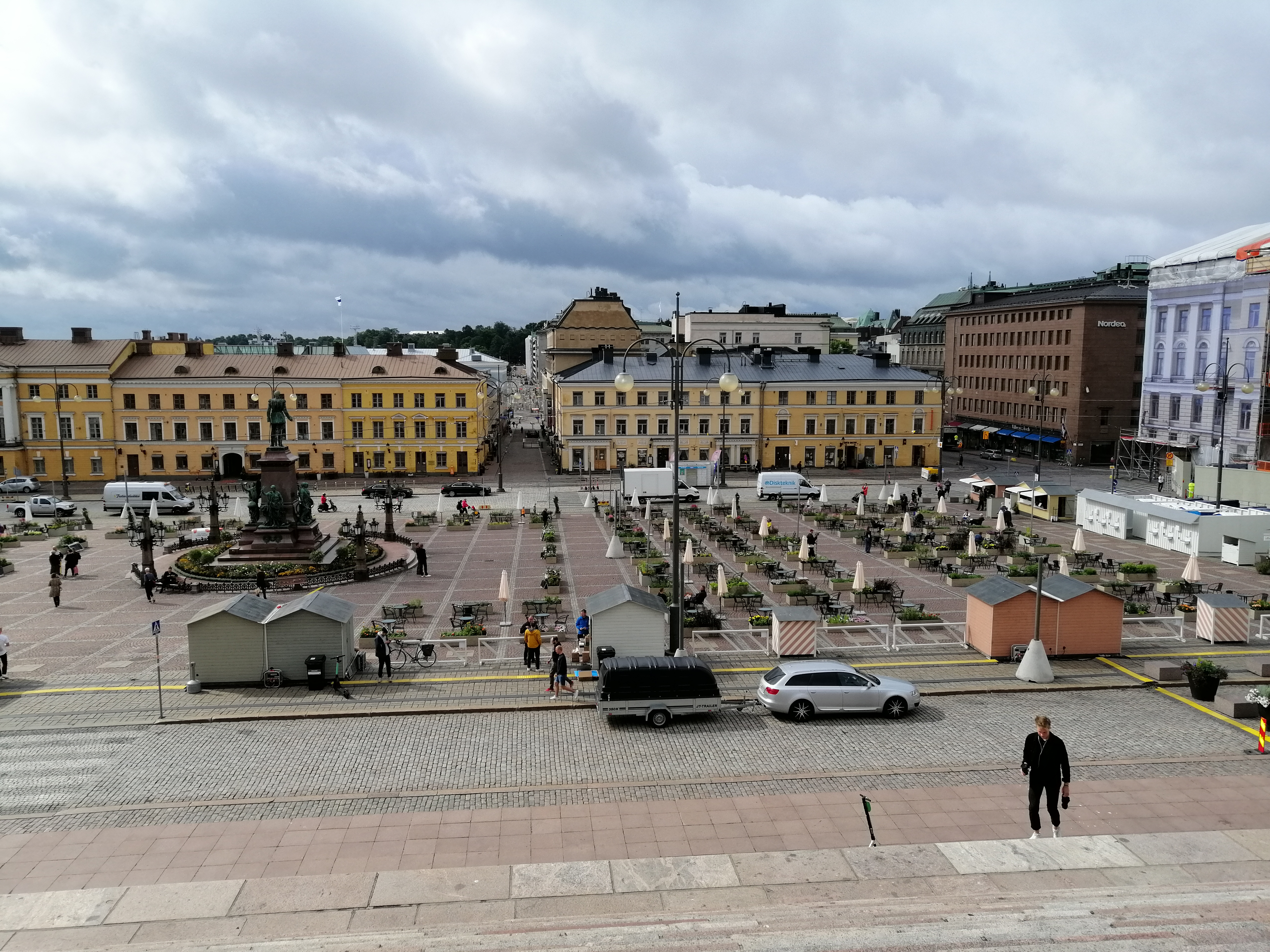
Open-air food court in 2020

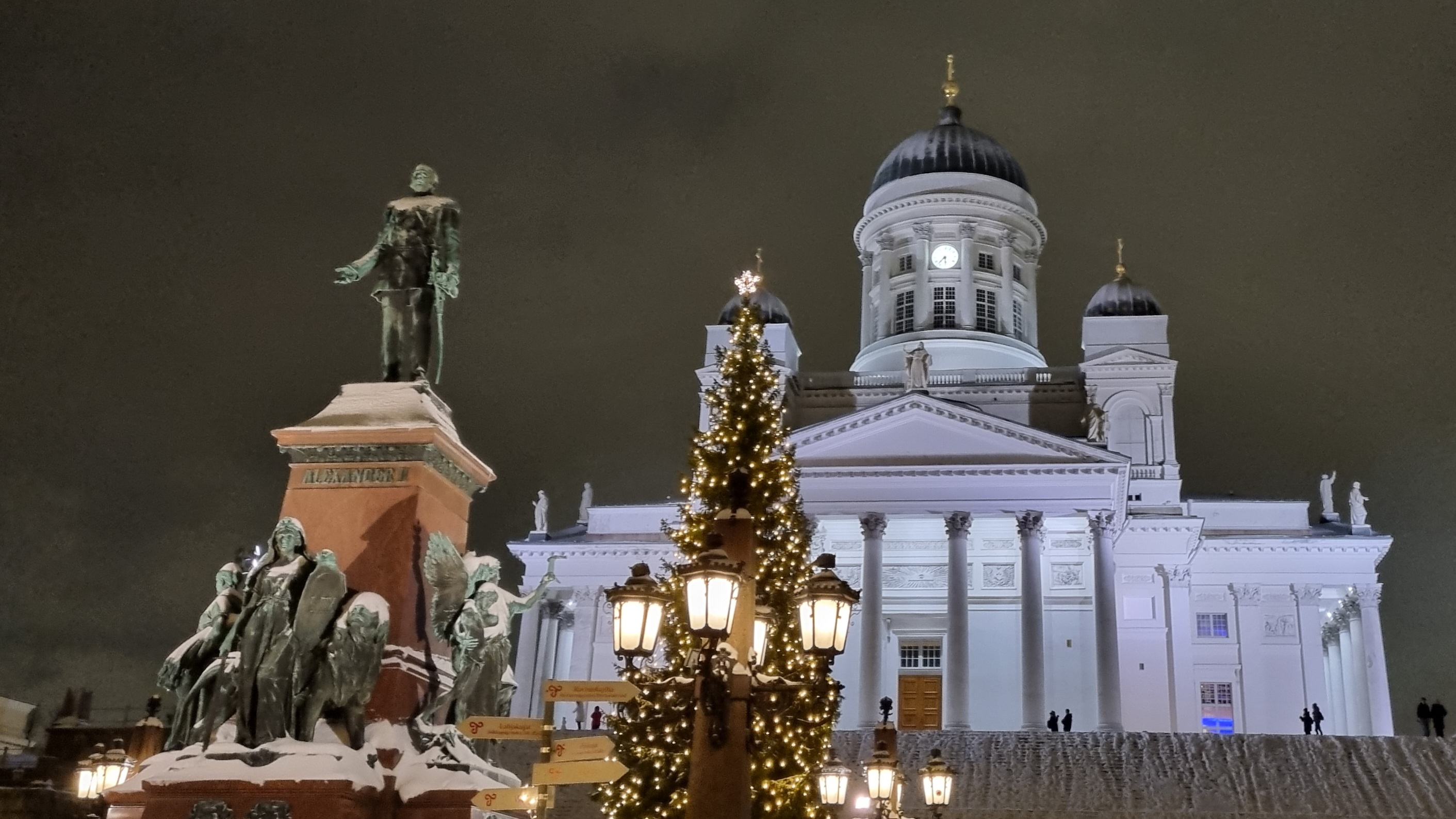
Christmas market in 2022.

== In popular culture ==
=== Film ===
- The title sequence of John Huston's The Kremlin Letter (1970) was filmed over the square at night, including the silhouette of the cathedral.
- American actor and film director Warren Beatty filmed scenes from his film Reds (1981) on the square — Helsinki playing the role of Saint Petersburg — but without showing the cathedral.
- Snowy night scenes from Jim Jarmusch's film Night on Earth (1991) were filmed on the square, but given the impression that there is a traffic roundabout at the center.

=== Music ===
- The opening sequence of the music video for "Sandstorm" by Darude was filmed on Senate Square, prominently featuring the cathedral in the background.

== See also ==
- Market Square
- Esplanadi
