= Government Palace (Finland) =

Government Palace Valtioneuvoston linna Statsrådsborgen
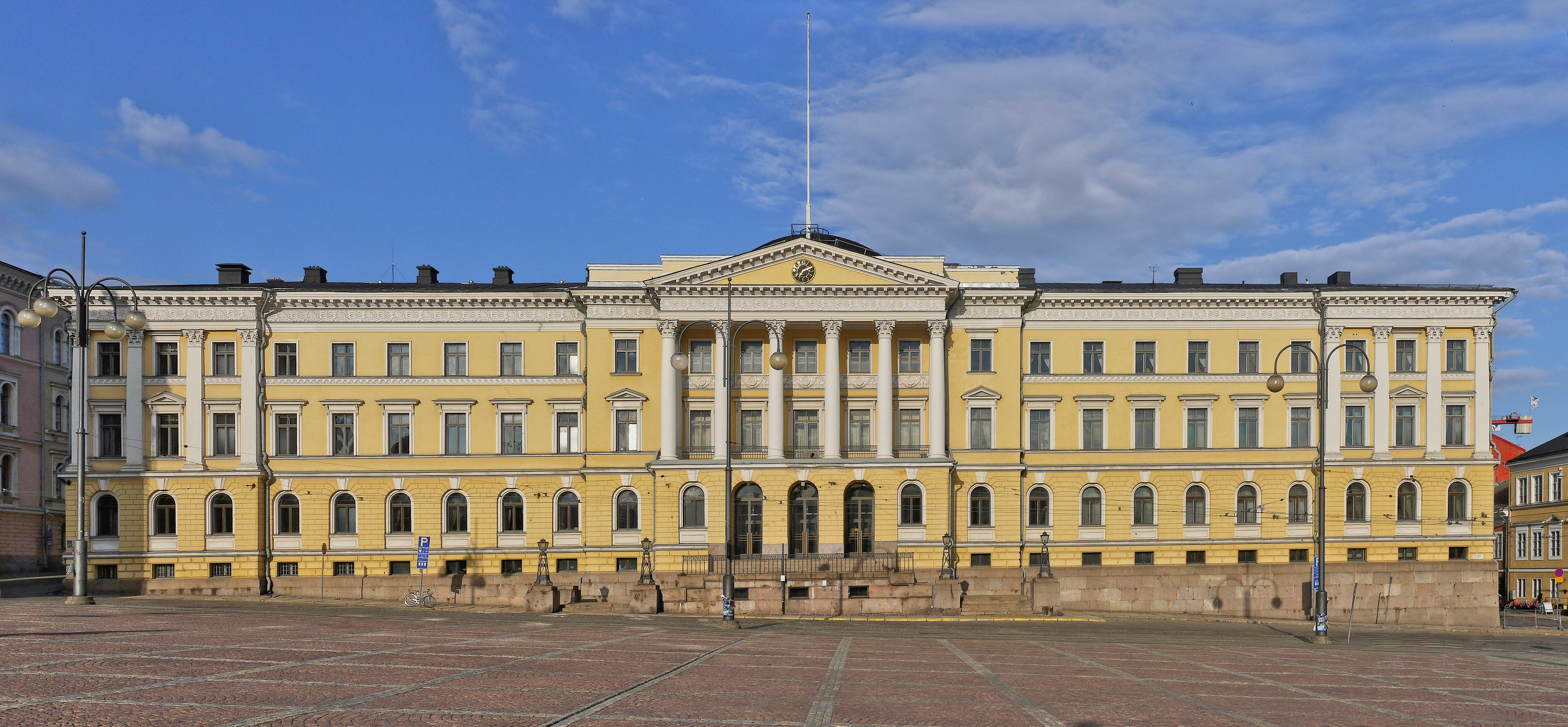
- Interactive map of the Government Palace; Valtioneuvoston linna Statsrådsborgen area
- Former names: Senaatintalo

General information
- Type: Governmental
- Architectural style: Neoclassical
- Location: Helsinki, Finland, Snellmaninkatu 1 A
- Coordinates: 60°10′10″N 024°57′16″E
- Current tenants: Finnish Government
- Construction started: 1818
- Completed: 1822
- Owner: Senate Properties

Design and construction
- Architect: Carl Ludvig Engel

The Government Palace (Finnish: Valtioneuvoston linna, Swedish: Statsrådsborgen) is the executive office building of the Government of Finland. It overlooks the Senate Square in central Helsinki, Finland. The Government Palace houses the Prime Minister's Office, the Office of the Chancellor of Justice and most departments of the Ministry of Finance. Its former name is the Senate House (Senaatintalo). The building is usually not open to the public but on occasions there are open days.

== History ==
Work on building the Senate began in 1818. The Senate moved to the palace overlooking Senate Square in 1822. The wing on the Aleksanterinkatu (south) side was completed in 1824 followed by the Ritarikatu (east) wing in 1828. The Hallituskatu (north) side was not closed off until several decades later with a courtyard annex added in 1860 to house the Senate printing press. The Ritarikatu and Hallituskatu sides were later subsequently renovated and altered. The Government Palace acquired its present appearance between 1916 and 1917 with the heightening of the Ritarikatu wing.

In addition to the organs of the Senate itself, the Senate building was in the early years also home to a wide range of other important public agencies and offices, including the Office of Exchange, Lending and Deposits, Postal Directorate, Customs Board, and National Archives. The Imperial Alexander Pharmacy was also located in the Senate building before it moved to the building completed on the opposite side of Senate Square in 1832. In 1840 the Office of Exchange, Lending and Deposits was renamed the Bank of Finland, which remained in the Senate building until moving in 1883 to its own facility nearby.

In 1904 Eugen Schauman shot Governor-General of Finland Nikolai Bobrikov in the second floor level of the staircase of the building.

== Gallery ==
History
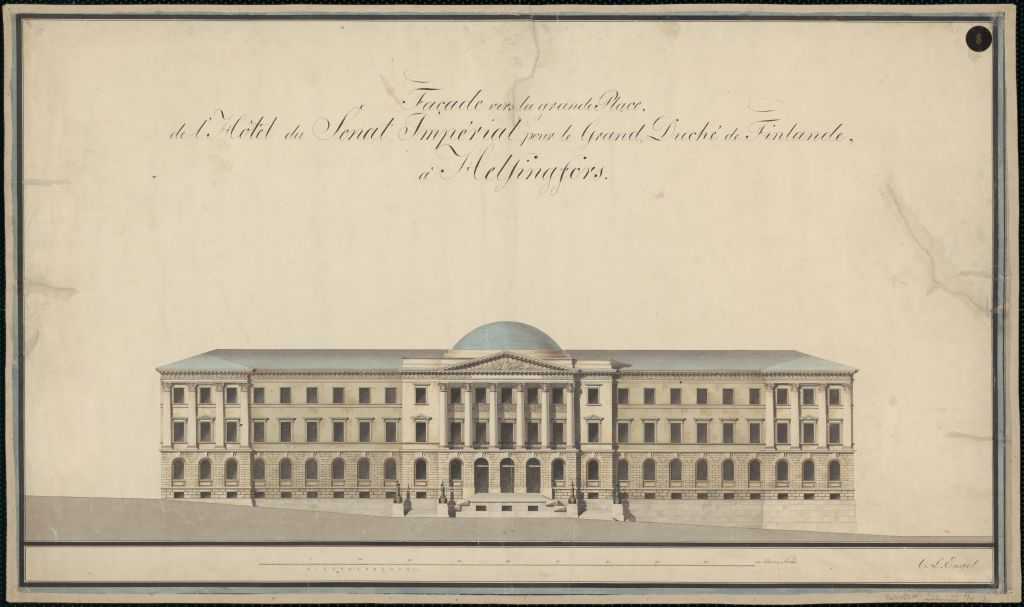
Original sketch by Carl Ludvig Engel, 1812–19

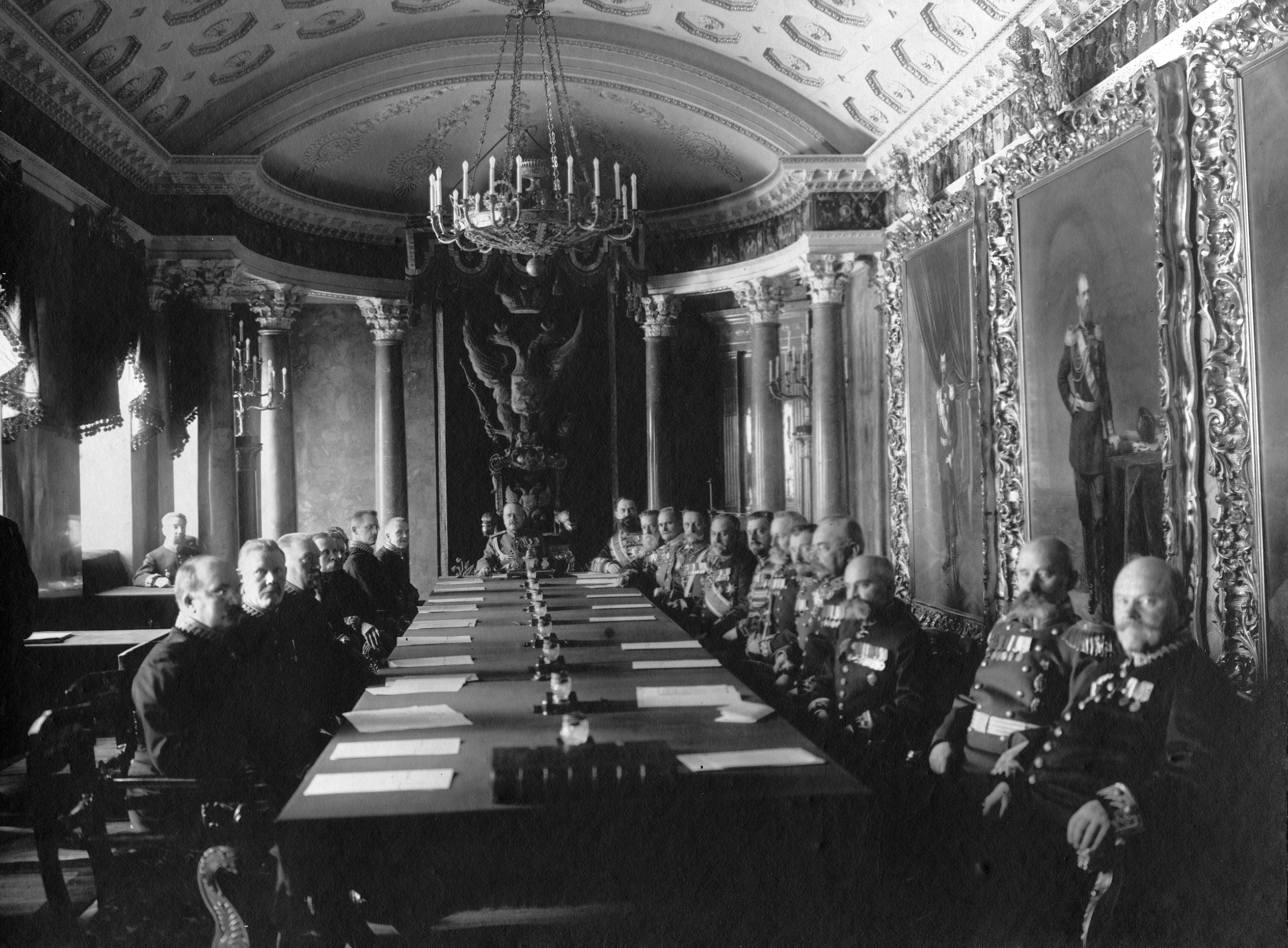
So-called Amiraalisenaatti (government of the Grand Duchy of Finland in 1909–1917) in 1915. At the end of the table on the left Franz Albert Seyn and on the right Mikhail Borovitinov.

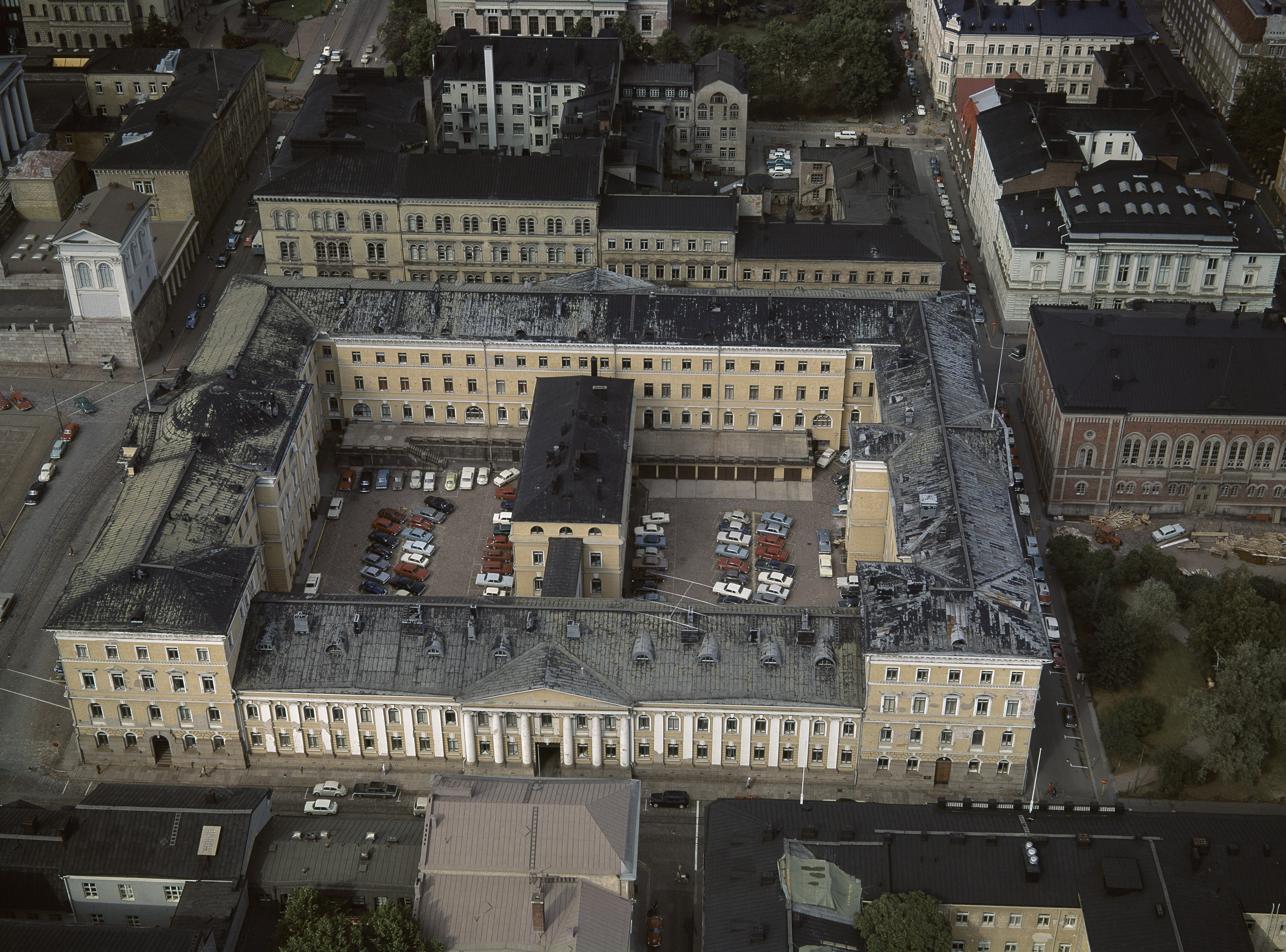
The building from above in the 1960s
Inner architecture
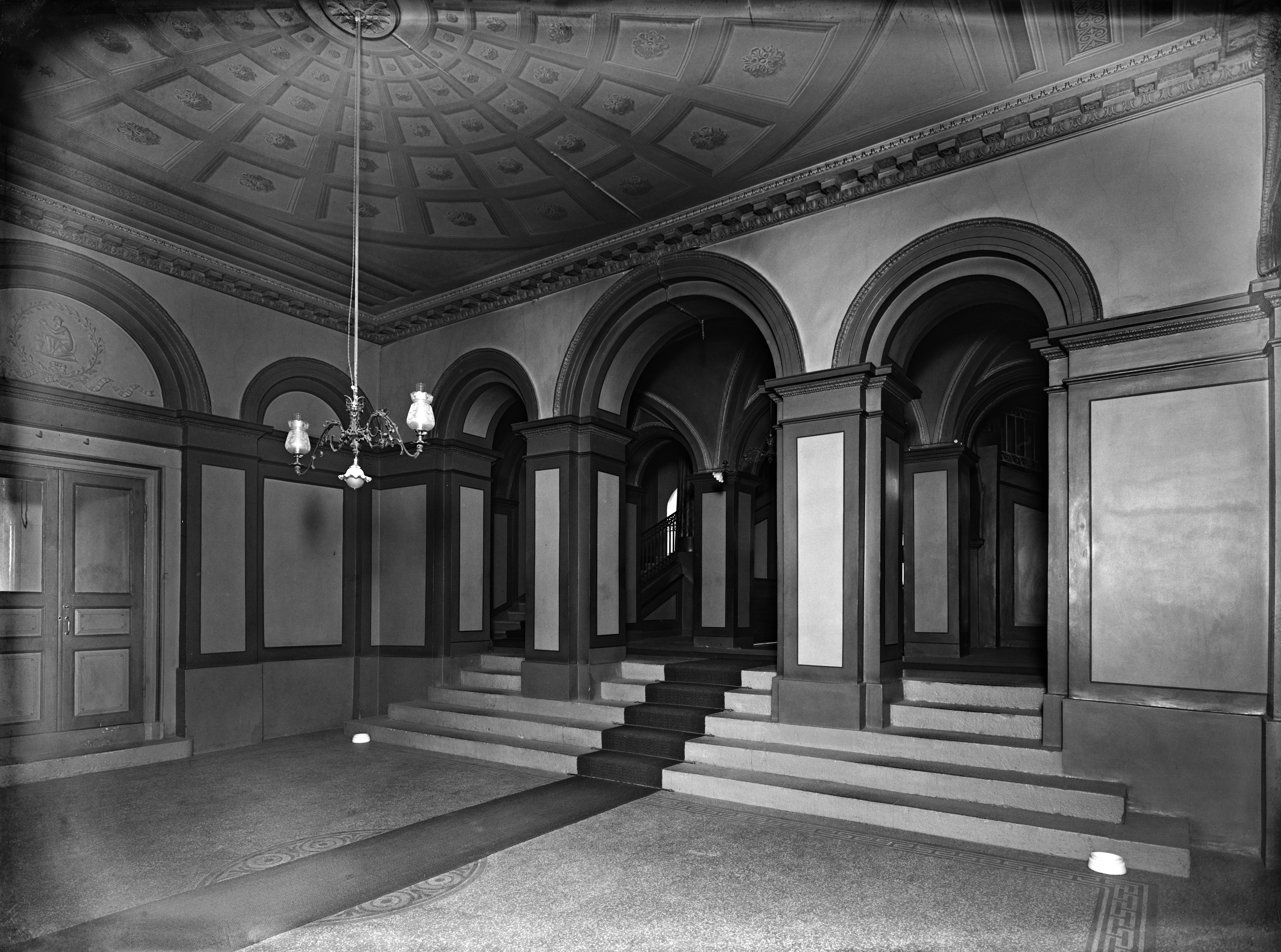
Lobby, photograph taken in 1917

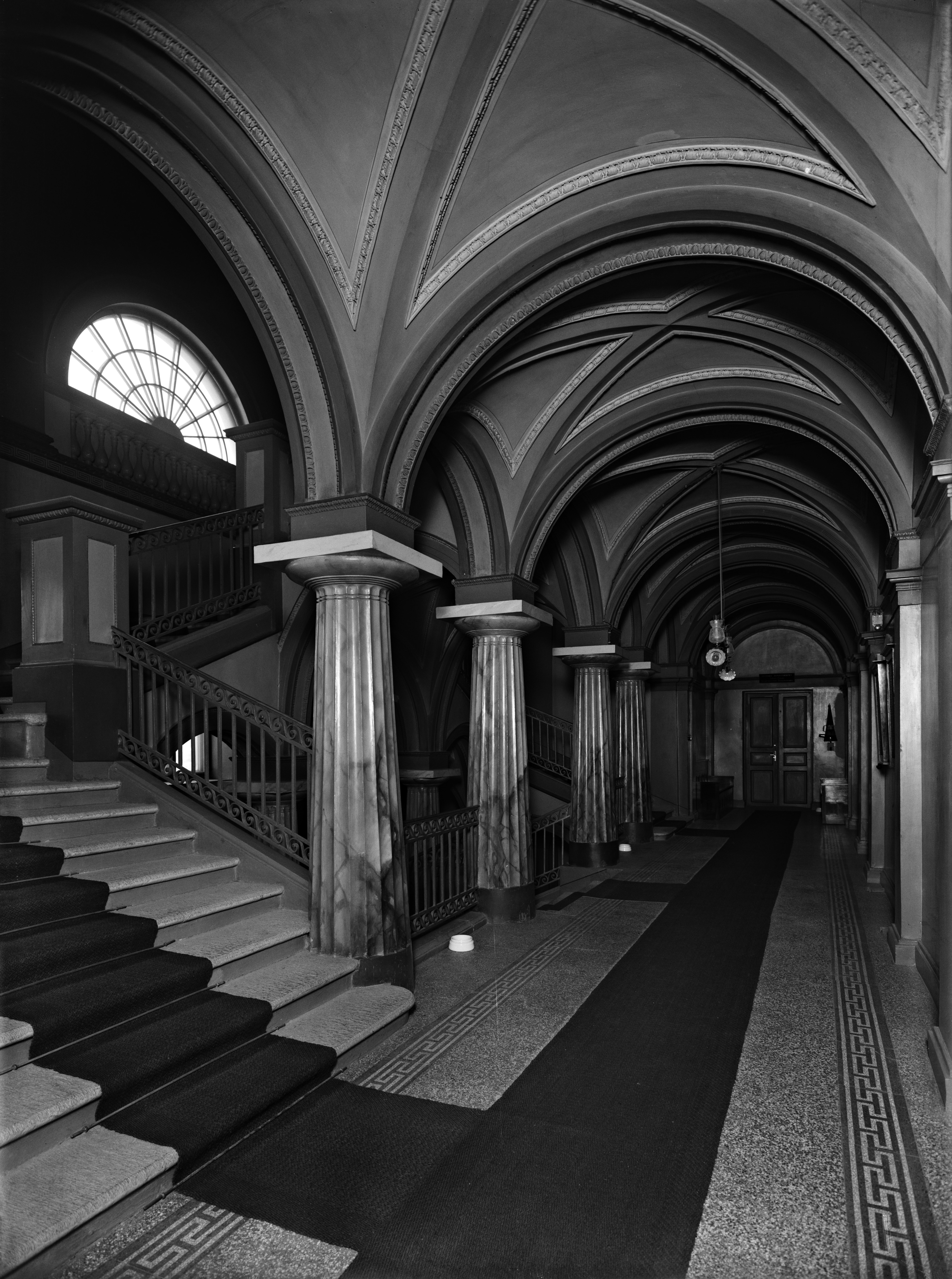
Staircase, 1917

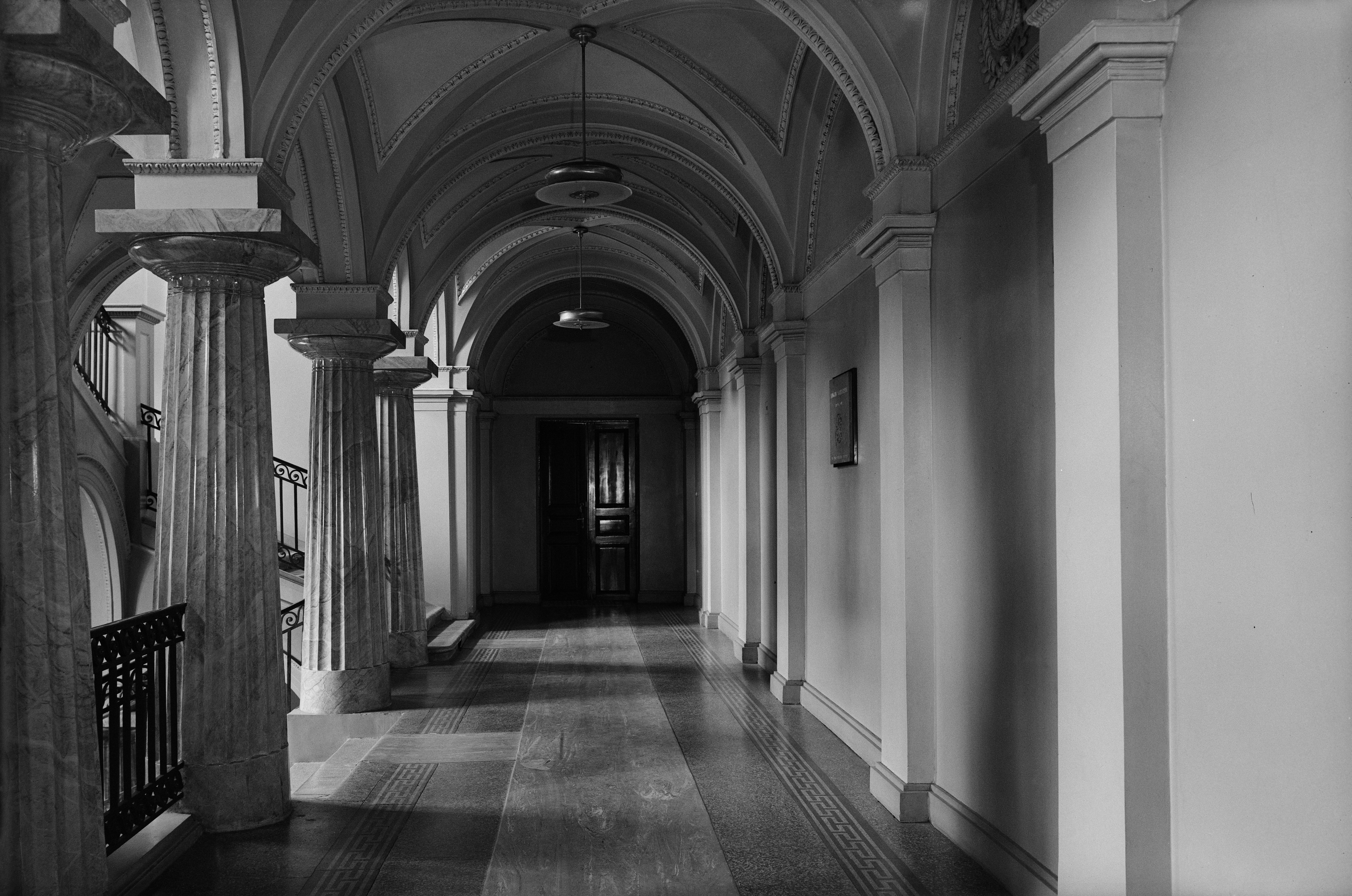
Second floor level of the staircase, with a plaque on the right observing the spot where Schauman shot Bobrikov

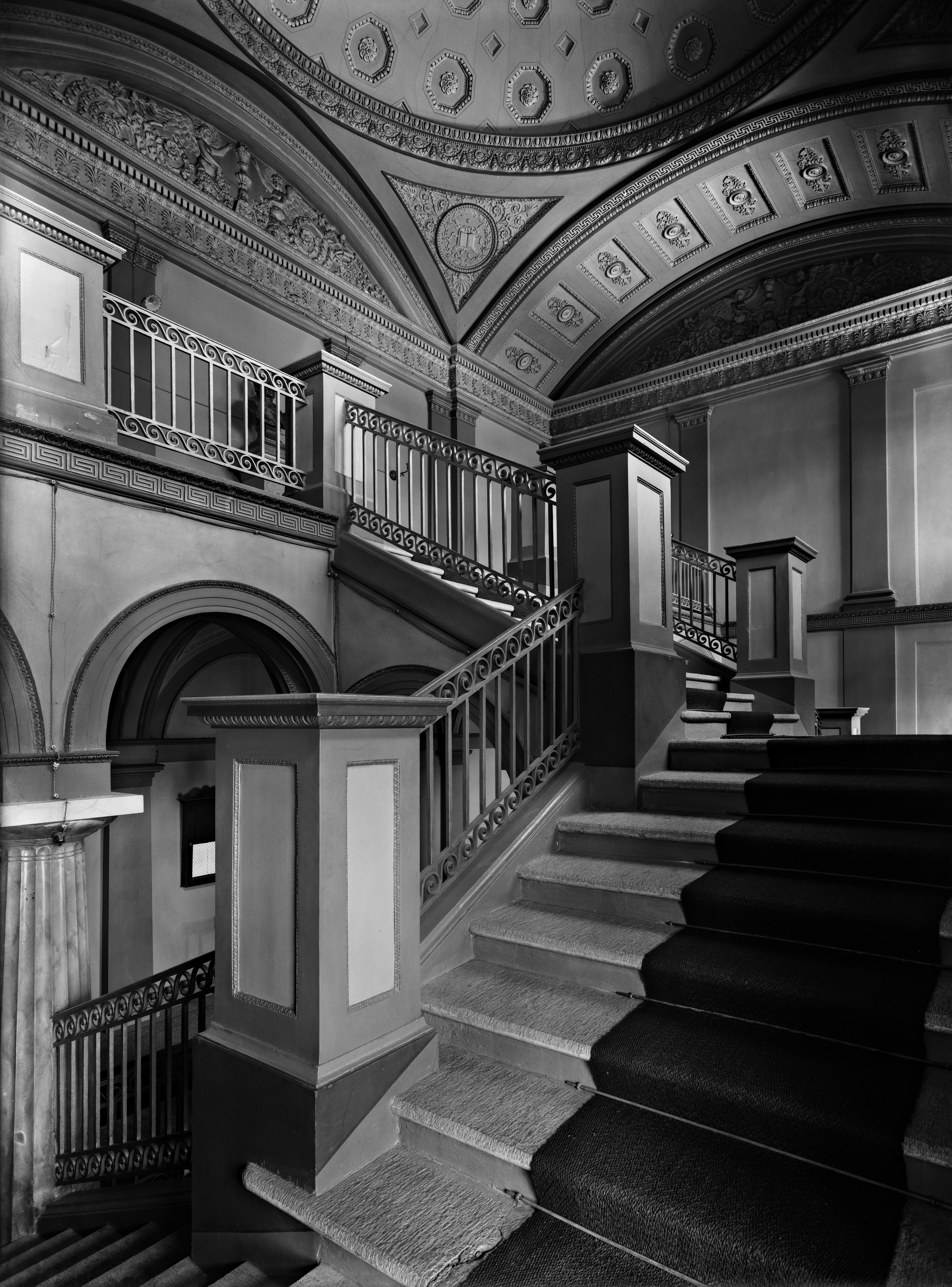
Staircase, 1917

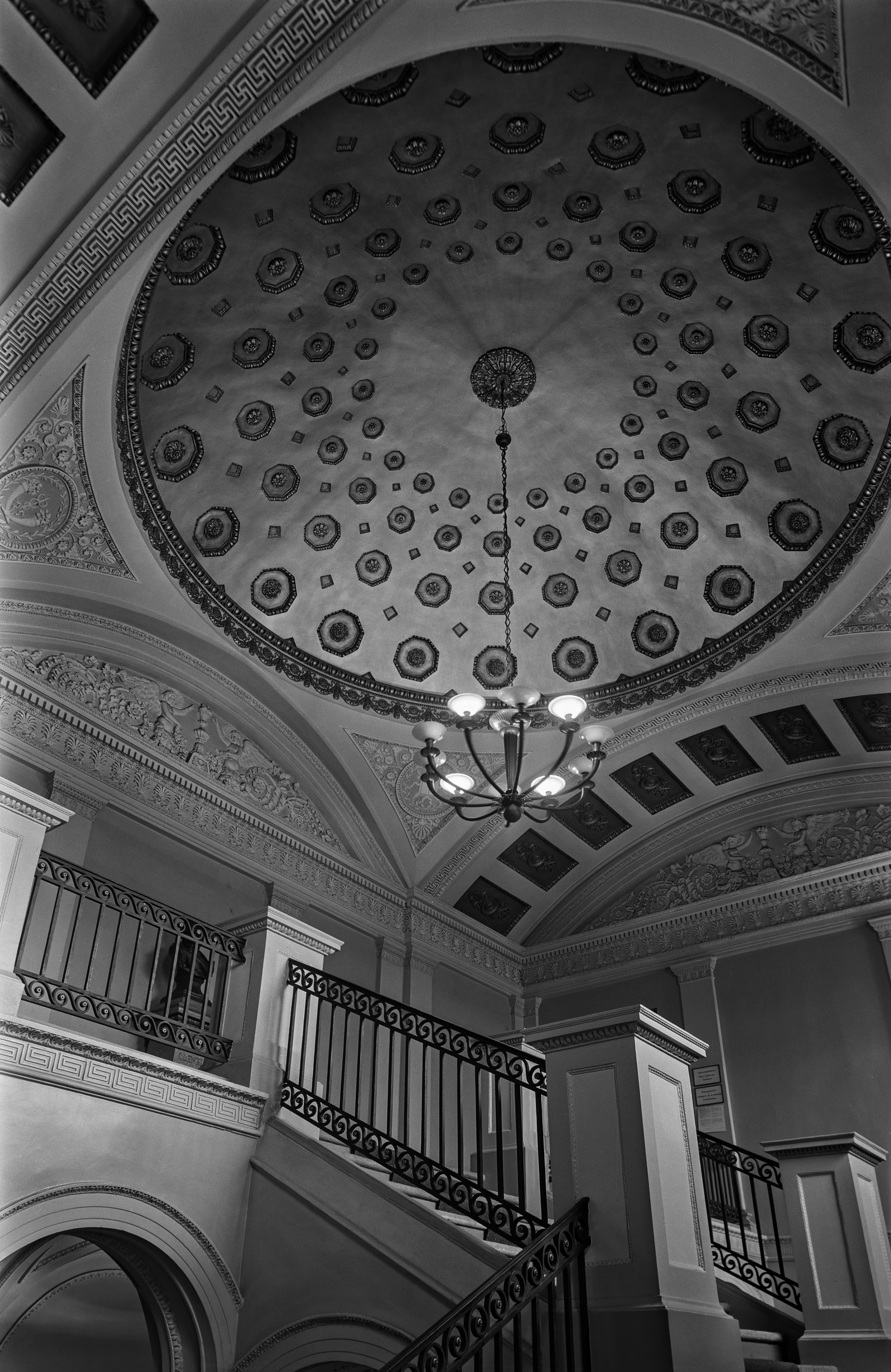
Dome ceiling, 1941

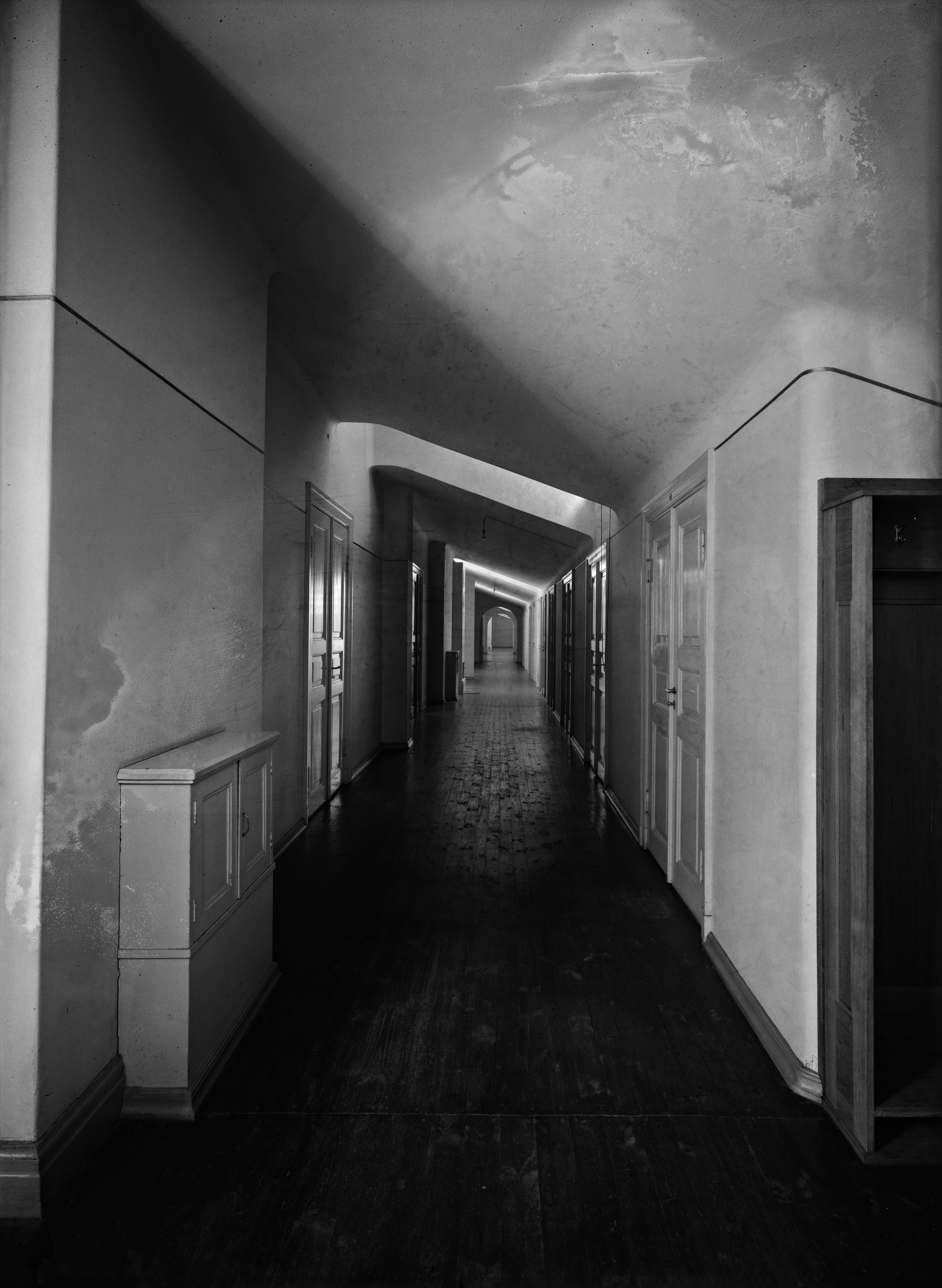
Hallway, 1917

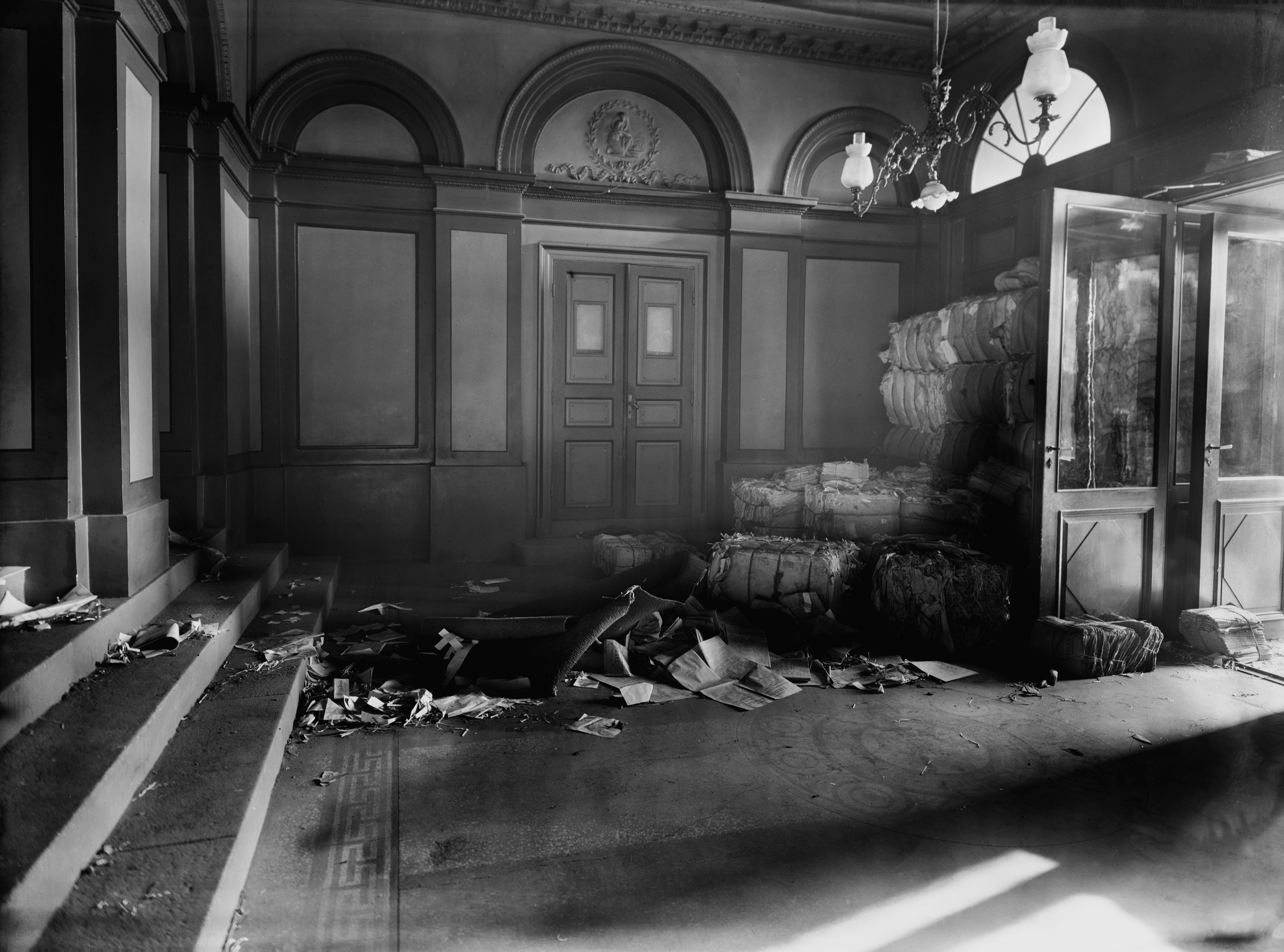
Lobby after or during the 1918 Battle of Helsinki, with the entryway barricaded

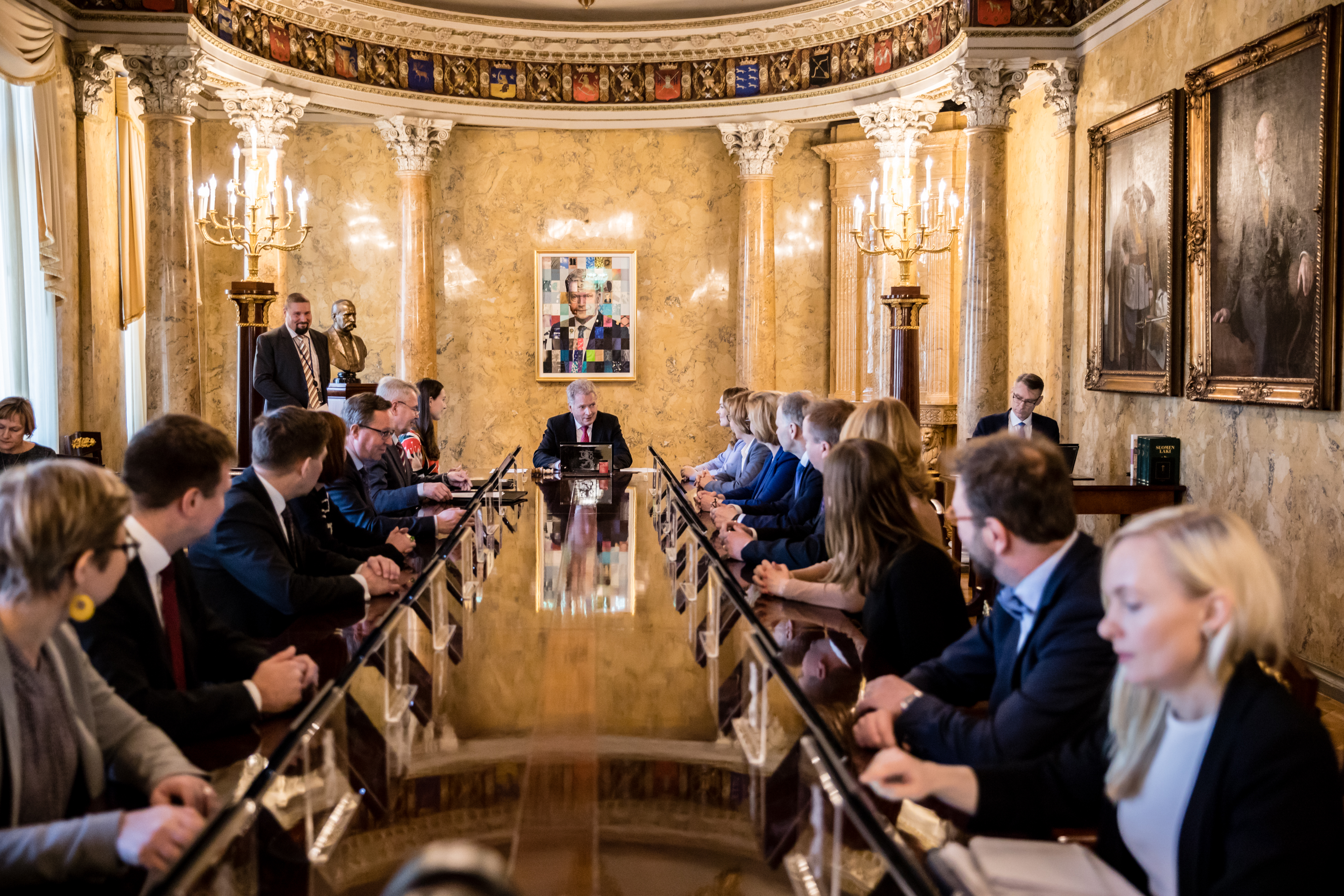
Presidential hall in February 2020.

== See also ==
- Presidential Palace, Helsinki
- Eduskuntatalo
