= National Enforcement Authority of Finland =

Finnish national authority

Enforcement Authority of Finland
- Ulosottolaitos
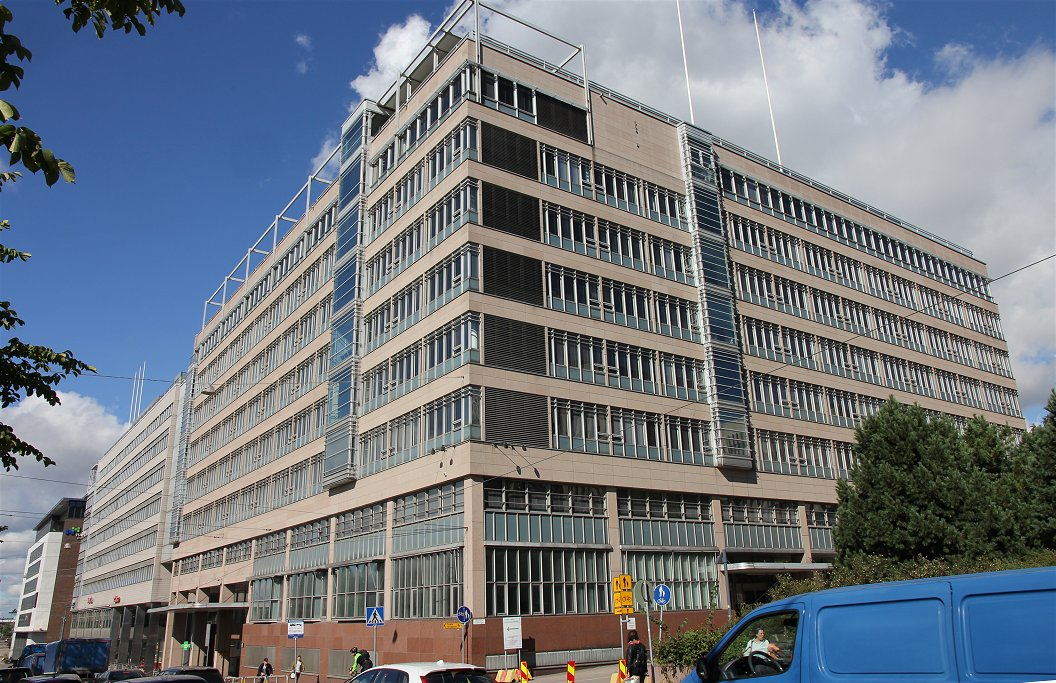
- The Enforcement Authority's office in Helsinki.

Agency overview
- Formed: December 1, 2020; 4 years ago
- Preceding agency: National Enforcement Agency of Finland (Valtakunnanvoudinvirasto) (2010–2020)
- Jurisdiction: Finland
- Headquarters: Turku, Finland
- Employees: 1,162 (2023)
- Annual budget: €98.7 million (2023)
- Minister responsible: Ministry of Justice
- Agency executive: Veikko Minkkinen, National Enforcement Officer (Valtakunnanvouti)
- Website: Official website

The Enforcement Authority of Finland (Finnish: Ulosottolaitos, Swedish: Utsökningsverket) is the national authority responsible for enforcement in Finland. It was established on December 1, 2020, through the merger of the former National Administrative Office for Enforcement (Valtakunnanvoudinvirasto) and 22 regional enforcement offices. The authority is led by the National Enforcement Officer (Valtakunnanvouti), currently Veikko Minkkinen.

== Organization ==
The Enforcement Authority has 64 offices across Finland. Its central administration and main office are located in Turku.

The organization is divided into central administration and operational units. The operational units include:

- Basic enforcement
- Extensive enforcement, which is divided into five regional units: Southern, Western, Central, Northern, and Eastern Finland
- Special enforcement
- Common services, which include registry, document management, payment transactions, customer service, administrative tasks, asset realization, audit, and support services

The central administration consists of four units:

- Strategy Unit
- Legal Unit
- Administrative Unit
- Development and Guidance Unit
