= Law of Finland =

The law of Finland (Finnish: Suomen laki, Swedish: Finlands lag) is based on the civil law tradition, primarily consisting of statutory law promulgated by the Parliament of Finland.

In the statutory hierarchy, the Constitution (Finnish: Suomen perustuslaki, Swedish: Finlands grundlag), originally approved in 1919 and rewritten in 2000, holds supreme authority and establishes basic rights and key procedures for enacting and applying legislation, with acts of Parliament (Finnish: laki, Swedish: lag) serving as primary legislation alongside the Constitution, though subordinate to acts on the autonomy of Åland. Permanent decrees (Finnish: asetus, Swedish: förordning) may be issued by the President of the Republic (Finnish: tasavallan presidentti, Swedish: republikens president), Government (Finnish: valtioneuvosto, Swedish: stadsrådet) or a Ministry (Finnish: ministeriö, Swedish: ministerium) when permitted by an act of Parliament. Decrees serve as secondary legislation clarifying acts and guide their implementation but cannot contradict them. As a member of the European Union, European Union law is in force in Finland, and Finland implements EU directives through national legislation. The Court of Justice of the European Union is the ultimate authority on matters within the competence of the European Union.

As is typical in civil law systems, judicial decisions are generally not authoritative, and there is limited development of precedent. Supreme Court decisions may be cited, but courts are not bound to follow previous rulings. Similar to Sweden, administrative law is interpreted by a separate system of administrative courts.

== History ==
Finnish law and legal traditions are rooted in Swedish law and, more broadly, in the Scandinavian and German legal traditions, which are subsets of Roman law. The oldest instruction still applied is Olaus Petri's instructions for judges from 1530, although these are not legally binding. Parts of the oldest act formally still in force are contained within the Swedish Civil Code of 1734. Books of Court Procedure (oikeudenkäymiskaari), Trade (kauppakaari), and Construction (rakennuskaari) formally remain in force; however, many corresponding acts have been repealed in Sweden. In practice, these older laws have been gradually superseded over time, and many provisions are no longer enforced, such as references to fines denominated in the ancient currency of the Swedish riksdaler.

A divergence from Swedish tradition began after the transfer of sovereignty to Russia in 1809. Significant codifications were made during Imperial Russian sovereignty, including the Criminal Code promulgated by Czar Alexander III in 1889. Finland had a representative body, the Diet of Finland, which convened in 1809 and was dissolved in 1906. The Diet was only actively legislative from 1863; between 1809 and 1863, the country was governed primarily by administrative means. Towards the end of the 19th century, the Imperial Russian government began restricting Finnish autonomy, often refusing Royal Assent. The Diet was replaced by the modern Parliament of Finland (eduskunta) in 1906 following general strikes and protesting, spurred by the defeat in the Russo-Japanese War, against the February manifesto issued in 1899. Following independence in 1917, the Constitution of Finland was promulgated in 1919. The constitution underwent numerous amendments throughout the 20th century, scattered across various acts. In 2000, a rewritten, consolidated version was enacted to replace them.

== Enacting laws ==
Acts of Parliament form the primary body of law. Typically, the Finnish Government proposes a bill to the Parliament of Finland, though members of parliament and the public through citizens initiatives may also do so. Bills proposed by members of parliament usually do not get processed due to great deference to bills proposed by the government. Constitutional law expert Ilkka Saraviita has stated the government has a legislative monopoly. Once amended and approved by Parliament, the act is submitted to the President of Finland for presidential assent. Upon the President's signature, the act becomes law. The President may exercise a right of veto, but Parliament can override the veto with a simple majority.

Decrees are based on an authorization (authorization for delegation) stipulated in an act of Parliament. Decrees can be issued by the Finnish Government, the President of Finland, and individual ministries. They are formally enacted during President in session with the Government (presidentin esittely).

The European Union can issue both Regulations, which are directly applicable law in member states, and Directives, which are implemented in Finland through acts of Parliament.

== Publication of laws ==
Finland does not have a single unified civil code, unlike countries such as France or Germany. All laws are published in the official journal Suomen säädöskokoelma (the Statutes of Finland) upon promulgation. Most legislation is available through the online Finlex database, published by Edita Publishing Oy, and in a two-volume book set Suomen laki, published by Talentum Media. However, these collections are not entirely exhaustive.

== See also ==
- Judicial system of Finland
- Law enforcement in Finland
