= Finlex =

Finnish legal website

Finlex is a website that publishes information on judicial affairs of Finland. The website is owned by the Ministry of Justice of Finland and operated by Edita Publishing Oy. Finlex offers a collection of Finnish laws and decrees, judgments of Finnish courts, international treaties concluded by Finland and government bills proposed by the Finnish government.

The website is free to use.
