= Justitieråd =

Justitieråd may refer to:

- Justice of the Supreme Court of Sweden
- Justice of the Supreme Court of Finland
