= Criminal Sanctions Agency =

Finnish government agency

- Rikosseuraamuslaitos

Agency overview
- Formed: 2010; 15 years ago
- Preceding agencies: Rikosseuraamusvirasto (2001–2009); Kriminaalihuoltolaitos (2001–2009)
- Jurisdiction: Finnish Government
- Employees: 2700
- Agency executive: Anna Arola-Järvi, Director-General
- Parent department: Ministry of Justice

Criminal Sanctions Agency (abbreviated to Rise, Finnish: Rikosseuraamuslaitos, Swedish: Brottspåföljdsmyndigheten) is a Finnish government agency that enforces prison sentences, community service sentences and maintains rehabilitation services. Rise operates under the direction of the Ministry of Justice.

Rise maintains 26 prisons and 14 community service offices in Finland.

== See also ==
- Human rights in Finland
- Law enforcement in Finland
- Judicial system of Finland
