= Supreme Administrative Court of Finland =

Branch of the Finnish judiciary

Coordinates: 60.1652°N 24.9499°E

- Korkein hallinto-oikeus, högsta förvaltningsdomstolen
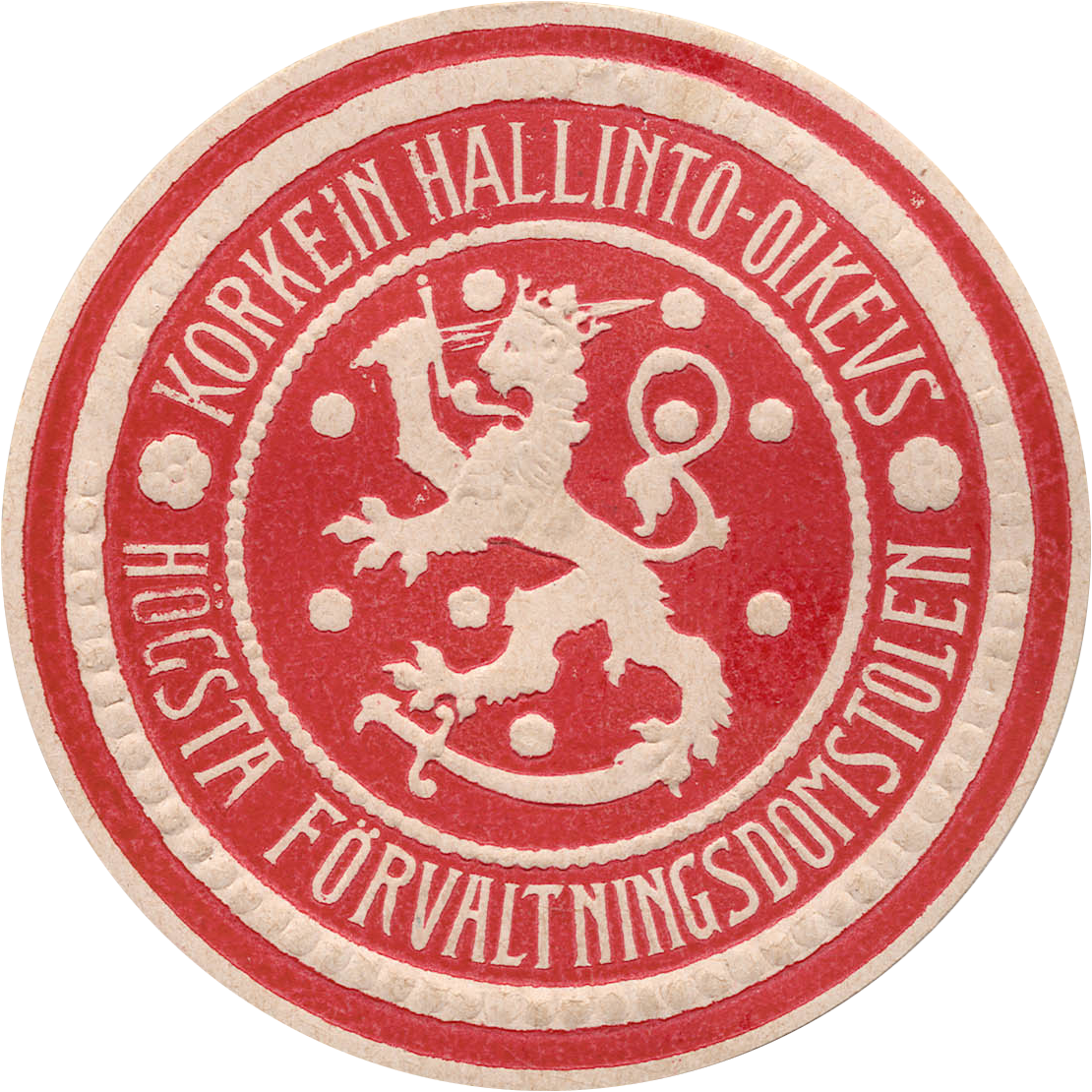
- Seal
- Interactive map of Supreme Administrative Court of Finland
- Established: 1918
- Jurisdiction: Finland
- Location: Helsinki, Finland
- Composition method: Appointed by the President of Finland
- Authorised by: Constitution of Finland
- Appeals from: Administrative Courts; Market Court(Limited) (Note: In matters concerning competition, supervision, and procurement); Finnish Government
- Number of positions: President and 15+ justices.
- Language: Finnish and Swedish
- Type of tribunal: Administrative
- Website: www.kho.fi

President
- Currently: Kari Kuusiniemi
- Since: 2018

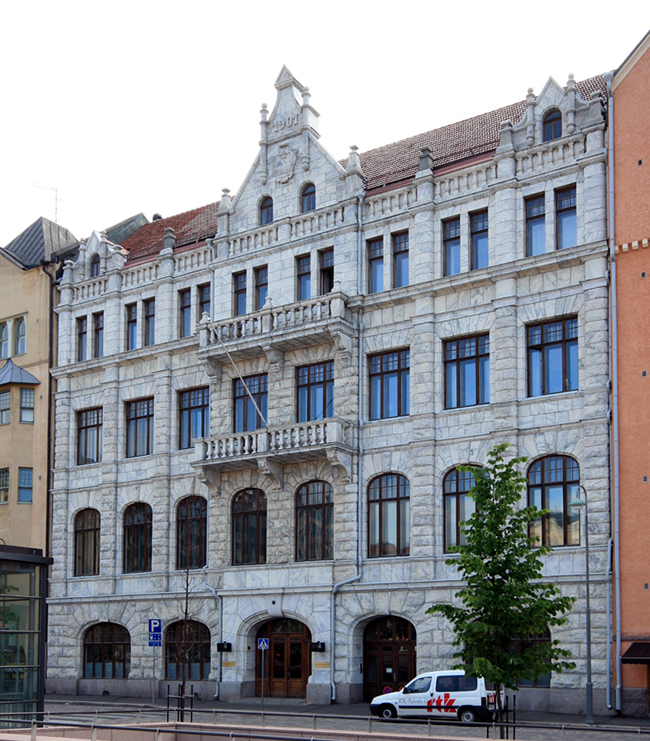
The Supreme Administrative Court building in Helsinki

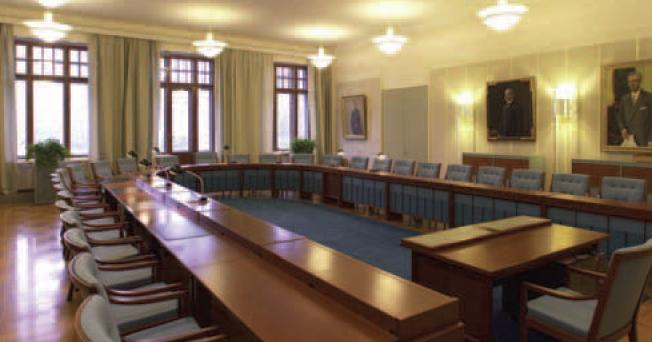
Plenary room

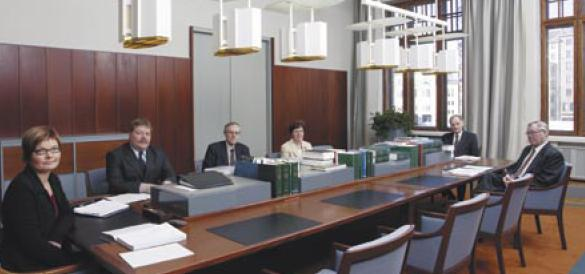
The second section of the Supreme Administrative Court of Finland in session

The Supreme Administrative Court of Finland (Finnish: korkein hallinto-oikeus, Swedish: högsta förvaltningsdomstolen) is the highest court in the Finnish administrative court system, parallel to the Supreme Court of Finland. Its jurisdiction covers the legality of the decisions of government officials, and its decisions are final. Appeals are made to the Supreme Administrative Court from the decisions of the Regional Administrative Courts and the Finnish Government. It also hears appeals from the Market Court on matters of competition, supervision, and procurement

In administrative matters, the Supreme Administrative Court has the sole power to grant extraordinary means of appeals, which are the annulment of a decision, a complaint against it, or an extension of the already-lapsed time of appeal.

As in all Finnish administrative courts, the legal costs of both parties in the Supreme Administrative Court are born, unless it is reasonable to award the prevailing party all or part of the costs. Nonetheless, when the authority prevails against a private claimant, it must bear all its costs, unless the private party has made a frivolous claim.

== Presidents ==
President	In office
K. J. Ståhlberg	1918-1919
Hugo Rautapää	1919–1922
Karl Söderholm	1923–1929
Urho Castrén	1929–1956
E. J. Ahla	1957–1958
Reino Kuuskoski	1958–1965
Aarne Nuorvala	1965–1982
Antti Suviranta	1982–1993
Pekka Hallberg	1993–2012
Pekka Vihervuori	2012–2018
Kari Kuusiniemi	2018–

== See also ==
- The homepage of the Supreme Administrative Court Of Finland
