= Judicial system of Finland =

National court system of Finland

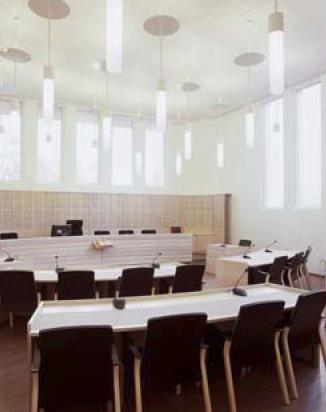
The courtroom of Raseborg's District Court

Under the Constitution of Finland, everyone is entitled to have their case heard by a court or an authority appropriately and without undue delay. This is achieved through the judicial system of Finland.

The Finnish judicial system is mostly organized under the Ministry of Justice, and consists of

- the independent courts of law and administrative courts
- the prosecution service
- the enforcement authorities, who see to the enforcement of judgments
- the prison service and the probation service, who see to the enforcement of custodial sentences, and
- the Bar Association and the other avenues of legal aid.

== Background ==
The Finnish legal system originated during the period before Swedish rule. The traditional system of tings for criminal cases and civil disputes continued after conquest and the country's first court of appeals was established at Turku in 1634. Olaus Petri's The Rules for Judges unified legal system since the 1530s and the law concerning the judicial procedure, the Code of Judicial Procedure (Finnish: Oikeudenkäymiskaari), was instituted as part of the legal codification of 1734. Since then, the Code has undergone numerous changes.

Nowadays, the Finnish courts are divided into two main branches: general courts dealing with civil suits and criminal cases, and administrative courts regulating the actions of the administration and litigations between individuals and the administration. This division dates to the administrative procedure of the 18th and 19th centuries and was formalized in 1918 when two sections of the Senate became the newly independent country's two highest courts. The Senate Department of Justice became the Supreme Court, and part of the Senate Finance Department was the basis of the Supreme Administrative Court. The two court systems are entirely separate, and they have no jurisdiction over one another. The establishment of the two courts was confirmed by the Constitution Act of 1919.

Overseeing the system of justice are the Chancellor of Justice and the Parliamentary Ombudsman. Although these two officials have largely parallel functions and each is required to submit an annual report of their activities to Parliament, the Chancellor of Justice is appointed for life by the President and is a non-voting member of the Government, whereas the Parliamentary Ombudsman is chosen for a four-year term by the Parliament. Both officials receive complaints from citizens about the conduct of civil servants, and on their own may investigate all public officials and may order prosecutors to proceed against them. The Chancellor of Justice also supervises advocates. Both officials may call any Finnish authorities to render such assistance as they deem fit.

As in the other Nordic countries, there is no constitutional court. Issues dealt with by a court of this kind elsewhere are handled by the Parliament's Constitutional Committee.

== Principles of criminal justice ==
Finnish thinking on criminal policy, as it was evolved by the 1980s, regards the punishment of offenders essentially as society's reproach to the criminal. In the abstract, the type and the length of punishment prescribed by law are considered indicative of the norms of society regarding the seriousness of the offense and the potential threat posed to society by the offender. In practical terms, punishments are standardized, and they are imposed consistently for all categories of crimes, in the interest of ensuring equality in the application of the law. For this reason, the penal code restricts the discretionary power of the courts in imposing sentences.

Imprisonment is not regarded as benefiting the offender, nor is the length of time in an institution to be set on the basis of need for treatment; it is accepted that punishment is detrimental and should be used sparingly. Thus, the tendency has been to rely on light punishment, especially on fines, and to emphasize short sentences of a few weeks or months.

In addition to ensuring that sentences are equal and proportional, the penal code advises that sentences imposed should not cause the "unregulated accumulation of sanctions," that is, when assessing punishment, courts should avoid several sanctions being imposed – such as dismissal from office, or revocation of a driver's permit – as the result of a single offense. The courts are also expected to ensure that punishment is not extended indirectly to the offender's family. Also, bail bonds do not exist in Finland, so if bail is ordered, it is enforced only by the threat of punitive measures and does not depend on the suspect's finances.

The tendency since the early 1970s has been to decriminalize a number of actions formerly indictable under the penal code. The modifications in the code reflected changing priorities in assessing the seriousness of criminal conduct, changing norms of social behavior, and an attempt to distinguish between premeditated crime and spontaneous actions. Among the acts decriminalized were creating a public disturbance because of drunkenness as well as certain offenses against property, such as petty theft. Homosexual acts between consenting adults also ceased to be regarded as a criminal offense. Stiff penalties for offenses against persons, threats of violence against persons, and driving under influence remained unaffected, however.

Finland has been less willing than other Scandinavian countries to replace punishment with other measures, such as treatment-oriented institutions for repeat offenders. Under legislation enacted in 1931, offenders "dangerous to private or public safety" could be confined in a separate institution for recidivists after their sentences had expired. In 1971 the law was amended so that property offenses could no longer be considered grounds for indeterminate incarceration, and conditions under which violent offenders could be so confined were more narrowly defined. As a result, the number of offenders held in internment of any kind fell dramatically, from nearly 400 in the 1960s to fewer than 10 in 1984. Although indefinite detention remained legal, this provision was not enforced after the mid-1970s.

== Legal profession ==
The basic degree for a legal professional in Finland is a Master of Laws degree. Additionally, the title of varatuomari can be earned by completing a one-year court training in a district court.

=== Advocates ===
Any lawyer applying for membership in the Finnish Bar Association must have completed a Master of Laws degree, entitling them to hold judicial office, and must be known to be a person of integrity. They also must have several years experience in the legal profession and other judicial duties. An advocate must be independent and autonomous in relation to the government and all other quarters with the exception of their client.

Only members of the bar association are entitled to use the professional title "advocates" (Finnish: asianajaja, Swedish: advokat). The Finnish Bar Association has about 1,570 members. Practising lawyers who are not members of the Bar Association may not meet the requirements for an advocate, or may prefer not to submit to the obligations of an advocate.

=== Prosecutors ===
The prosecutors in Finland are organised in two tiers. The prosecution service consists of the Office of the Prosecutor General in Helsinki and the local prosecution units in all 90 state local districts in Finland. The Office operates as the central administrative authority for the prosecution service.

The Prosecutor General is the supreme prosecutor and the head of the prosecution service. The current Prosecutor General is Ms. Raija Toiviainen. The Prosecutor General appoints local prosecutors, and directs and develops prosecutorial activity by issuing general instructions and guidelines to the prosecutors. The Prosecutor General may take over a case from a subordinate prosecutor. If the Parliament decides that charges are to be brought against the President of Finland or against a member of the Finnish Government in the High Court of Impeachment, the Prosecutor General acts as the prosecutor in the case. Some of the duties of the Prosecutor General are assigned to the Deputy Prosecutor General, the office of which is presently held by Jorma Kalske. For regular prosecutorial tasks, the office has thirteen State Prosecutors, whose jurisdiction covers the entire country.

In the state local districts, prosecutorial duties are performed by local district prosecutors. Their jurisdiction normally covers one local district. In addition, Åland has a provincial prosecutor. The Parliamentary Ombudsman and the Chancellor of Justice are competent to raise charges in special cases.

=== Judges and referendaries ===
Professional judges are appointed by the President of Finland, on the proposal of a judge selection committee. Appointments are permanent. Experience in other court functions qualifies for the task. Judges in higher and administrative courts are assisted by legally trained referendaries (viskaali).

Finland employs lay judges in serious cases in the district courts. They are not legally trained and not part of the legal profession. However, a professional judge serves as the chairman of the panel of judges.

== Courts ==
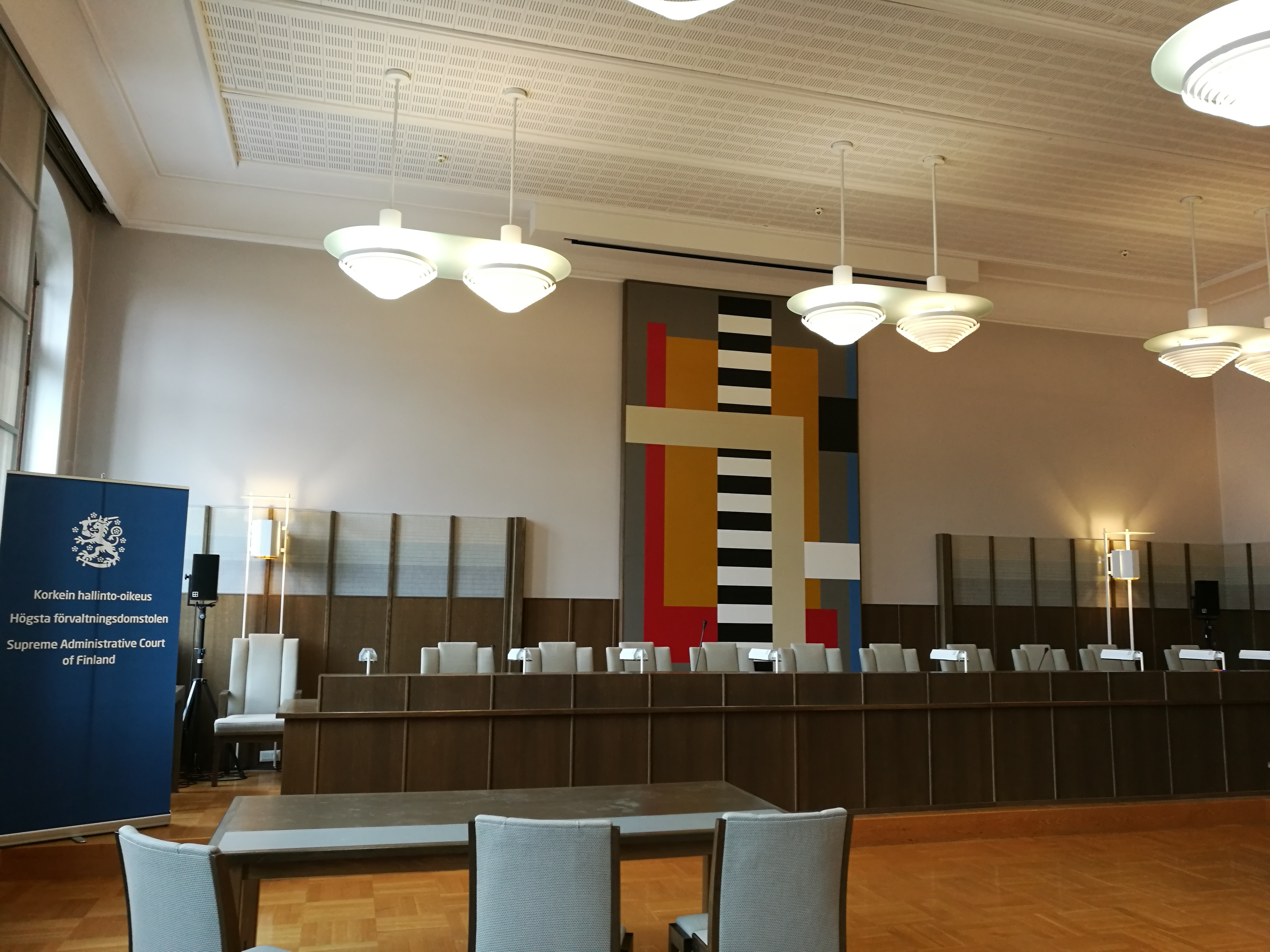
A courtroom of the Supreme Administrative Court of Finland in Helsinki

=== General Courts ===
==== District Courts ====
The Finnish District Courts (Finnish: käräjäoikeus, Swedish: tingsrätt) deal with criminal cases, civil cases and petitionary matters, such as divorce, the custody of children or debt adjustment. There are 27 district courts in Finland. A district court is headed by the chief judge (Finnish: laamanni, Swedish: lagman) and other judges (käräjätuomari, tingsdomare) who have the title of district judge. In certain cases, the district court may also have lay judges (lautamies, nämndeman). The cases are handled and resolved either in a session, or in chambers. In simple cases decisions can be made by notaries at the court or by trained office staff. The decision of a district court can normally be appealed in a Court of Appeal (hovioikeus, hovrätt).

Routine cases can be handled by a single district judge. More complicated cases are handled by three district judges. Lay judges sit nowadays only in criminal cases, previously also in certain civil matters. The composition with lay judges consists of the ordinary district judge at the District Court, acting as the chairperson, and two (or three) lay judges. The municipal councils appoint the lay judges for terms of four years. Each lay judge participates in a hearing approximately once a month. The District Court pays a hearing fee to the lay judges and reimburses them for loss of income. Lay judges are appointed by municipal councils, and are not a part of the legal profession.

Trial by jury does not exist in Finland as such. In civil cases, there are no non-professional judges involved in the process. In criminal cases, the common sense and popular sense of justice are represented by the three (or four, in complicated matters) lay judges. However, they participate both in the trying of fact and of law, as well as in sentencing.

==== Courts of Appeal ====
Appeals from the District Courts are addressed to the five Courts of Appeal (Finnish: hovioikeus, Swedish: hovrätt), located at Helsinki, Turku, Vaasa, Kuopio, and Rovaniemi. Most of the cases dealt with by the Courts of Appeal are appeals against decisions of the district courts. In addition, Courts of Appeal decide, as the first instance, matters of treason and high treason, as well as certain offences in public office. The Helsinki Court of Appeal has special responsibilities, such as granting parole to felons serving a life sentence.

The head of a Court of Appeal is the Chief Justice. The other judges of the court are called Senior Justices or Justices. Cases are presented for decision by legally trained referendaries, who are called Senior Assistant Justices or Assistant Justices. Most cases are heard by professional three-judge divisions, with each division headed by a Senior Justice. More important cases are tried before a plenary session of judges if the Chief Justice decides. In cases involving senior government officials, a court of appeals may serve as the court of first instance. The judges of the Courts of Appeal are appointed by the President, on the basis of a draft decision presented by the government.

In all types of cases, any party may appeal to the Court of Appeal. In the Finnish interpretation of the prohibition of double jeopardy, the case is considered closed only after the final verdict. Thus the prosecution or an injured party may appeal in criminal cases, in addition to the defence. The Court of Appeals usually completely retries the case, hearing the same evidence as presented in the District Court. The process is mainly verbal. However, the process economy rules require that the parties may present new evidence or make new claims only if that evidence was not available at the time of the trial in the District Court.

The verdict of the Court of Appeals may be executed immediately, even if one of the parties seeks a leave of appeal from the Supreme Court of Finland.

==== Supreme Court ====
The Supreme Court (Finnish: korkein oikeus, Swedish: högsta domstolen), located in Helsinki, consists of a president and 18 other justices, usually working in five-judge panels. The most important function of the Supreme Court is to rule on important points of law in cases which are significant for the entire legal order, guiding the administration of justice in future cases. Decisions of courts of appeal, as well as certain decisions of the Insurance Court may be appealed against to the Supreme Court, provided that it grants leave to appeal.

The Supreme Court gives advice to the President of the Republic in cases concerning the exercise of his or her right to grant a pardon, and to the Ministry of Justice in cases concerning extradition. It may provide legal opinions on government bills at different stages of the legislative process, and the president may consult it on bills passed by Parliament before ratifying them. The Supreme Court may also approach the president on its own initiative, and propose enactment of a new Parliament act or an amendment to an existing act.

The Supreme Court mainly relies on written evidence when deciding on a case. The court may, however, hold oral hearings in which the parties, witnesses and experts are heard in person. The oral hearings are public.

The president and other justices of the Supreme Court are appointed by the President of the Republic.

There are currently twenty justices in the court, including the president of the court.

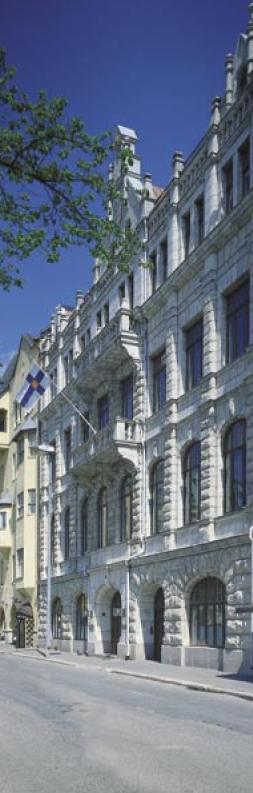
The courthouse of Supreme Administrative Court of Finland

=== Administrative Courts ===
==== Regional Administrative Courts ====
There are eight regional Administrative Courts (Finnish: hallinto-oikeus, Swedish: förvaltningsdomstol), named after their seats as the Administrative Courts of Helsinki, Hämeenlinna, Kouvola, Kuopio, Oulu, Rovaniemi, Turku and Vaasa. In addition, the autonomous region Åland has a separate administrative court. The judicial oversight of administrative acts is the task of the administrative courts. A person or a corporation that believes a decision of a state or local authority relating to them is illegal is entitled to appeal against the decision. The administrative acts are recognized from the hallmark that they become binding without the consent of the other involved parties. The contracts between authorities and private persons fall usually to the jurisdiction of the general court system.

As a Finnish peculiarity, the law may in some cases provide that a special, out-of-court appeal measure known as "rectification request" (oikaisuvaatimus) be taken before an administrative court may actually hear the case. The rectification request is lodged with the public authority (or private actor using public power) that made the original decision. By means of the request, the authority may double-check its decision (to rule out potential unintentionally incorrect application of law, spelling errors etc.) and possibly modify it, in order that an undisputedly unlawfully made decision need not be settled at court. The rectification process is regulated by the Administrative Procedure Act (434/2003). If the decision is not modified through rectification, an actual appeal may (in most cases) be lodged with the administrative court. That appeals process is regulated by the Administrative Judicial Procedure Act (586/1996). On appeal, the administrative court reviews the legality of the decision of the authority. The appeal may usually be made by an involved person, or by another authority charged with the supervision of public interest in the matters of its jurisdiction. Depending on the type of the case and the laws involved, the review by the administrative court may cover only the formal legality of the authority's procedure, but it may extend to the actual appropriateness of the decision. If the authority in question is overturned, the administrative court issues a decision in the case or submits it back to the authority for further consideration of facts. If the appellant or the authority is discontent with the decision of the administrative court, it is possible to appeal to the Supreme Administrative Court. The proceedings are chiefly written, but if the case requires, the administrative courts may conduct surveys, hold oral proceedings, hear witnesses, experts or involved parties, or receive opinions from other authorities.

The decisions of the municipal governments (Finnish: kunta, Swedish: kommun) can be appealed against by any member of the municipality, regardless whether the decision involves them. However, while the usual administrative court proceeding examines both the reasonableness and the legality of the decision, the municipal decision can only be overturned on the grounds of legality. In addition, a municipal decision may not be amended by the administrative courts, only overturned. However, in some areas of administration, the municipal government acts as an administrative authority, and its decisions can be appealed against in the normal manner.

The legal costs in the administrative court system are borne by the parties. However, the prevailing party may be awarded the legal costs partly or in full, if it is deemed reasonable in the light of the decision. If the private party prevails, the most important point considered is whether the proceeding was due to an error of the authority. The authority which prevails against a private party is not awarded its legal costs unless the appeal was frivolous.

All judges in administrative courts are professionals, appointed in the same manner as judges who sit in general courts. Judges work in three-judge panels in the regional administrative courts and in five-judge panels in the Supreme Administrative Court. In certain types of matters, part-time experts also participate in the proceedings of the Administrative Courts.

==== Supreme Administrative Court ====
The Supreme Administrative Court (Finnish: korkein hallinto-oikeus, Swedish: högsta förvaltningsdomstolen) consists of a president and 19 other justices. The court has three chambers.

The first chamber focuses on cases concerning building and planning, environmental permits, real property, waste management, water rights, roads, nature conservation, extraction of land resources and general administrative law. The second chamber handles cases concerning taxation and customs, competition, trades, access to documents, population administration, and driver's licences and other cases related to vehicles, as well as cases concerning traffic, financial management, pharmacies, agriculture and forestry, labour administration and state officials. The third chamber handles cases concerning social welfare, child welfare and public care of children, nationality, aliens, patents and registers, local government, local authority officials, Church law, handicap services, mental health, health care, health inspections, school education, public order and public entertainment, and firearms.

The chambers do not exclusively handle cases concerning the aforementioned subject-matters but may examine any types of cases falling within the court's jurisdiction. About 50 percent of the cases heard in the Supreme Administrative Court involve questions about taxes.

The current judges of the Supreme Administrative Court are:

- President Pekka Hallberg (appointed 1993)
- Justice Ahti Rihto (1988)
- Justice Ilmari Ojanen (1990)
- Justice Olof Olsson (1993)
- Justice Esa Aalto (1993)
- Justice Pirkko Ignatius (1994)
- Justice Lauri Tarasti (1994)
- Justice Raimo Anttila (1995)
- Justice Tuulikki Keltanen (1995)
- Justice Marita Liljeström (1997)
- Justice Olli Nykänen (1997)
- Justice Pekka Vihervuori (1998)
- Justice Marjatta Kaján (2000)
- Justice Heikki Kanninen (2000)
- Justice Kari Kuusiniemi (2003)
- Justice Niilo Jääskinen (2003)
- Justice Ilkka Pere (2003)
- Justice Ahti Vapaavuori (2003)
- Justice Irma Telivuo (2004)
- Justice Jukka Mattila (2004)

=== Special Courts ===
==== Market Court ====
The Market Court (Finnish: markkinaoikeus) is a special court that hears market law, competition and public procurement cases. It issues injunctions against illegal restrictions of competition and order monetary penalties. It has duties also in the supervision of mergers and acquisitions. In addition, the Market Court may overturn public procurement decisions, adjust the procurement process and order compensatory payments. As a peculiarity, the Market Court follows civil procedure in market law cases and administrative procedure in public procurement cases and in most competition cases. Similarly, in cases where civil procedure is followed, the appeals from the decisions of the Market Court are made to the Supreme Court, while the cases with administrative procedure are appealed to the Supreme Administrative Court.

==== Labour Court ====
The Labour Court has jurisdiction in disputes on collective agreements and collective civil service agreements. Disputes on individual employment relationships are heard by the general courts and disputes on individual civil service relationships by the administrative courts. Only labour unions or employer organizations may bring suits to the Labour Court. Similarly, only employers or labour unions may be called to answer in the Labour Court. If individual employees are called to answer, their labour union is to answer to charges on their behalf.

The Labour Court has 16 members elected by the President of Finland for three-year terms, four with a legal training, twelve with a labour market background. The Chief Justice and one Justice of the Labour court are full-time members with a legal training and without connections to labour market organizations. Two Vice Chief Justices are part-time members, with a legal training and without labour market connections. Four of the lay Justices are nominated by employer organizations, while four lay Justices are nominated by labour unions. The remaining four lay Justices are nominated similarly: Two by the labour market administrations of the State and the municipalities and two by the labour unions of civil servants. All lay Justices serve on part-time basis.

The decisions of the Labour Court are final and cannot be appealed against. The procedure followed in the Labour Court resembles the civil procedure.

==== Insurance Court ====
The Insurance Court has jurisdiction in certain matters of social insurance, such as accident insurance, employment pensions, civil service pensions and national pensions. Despite the name, the Insurance Court does not consider all kinds of private insurance contracts by private insurance companies, only those relating to accident insurance.

The Insurance Court has been recently criticized for favoring the insurance companies in cases relating to disability pensions arising from accident insurance contracts. The insurance companies reject 90% of the applications, and the court also has a 90% rejection rate. One of the judges of the court must be a certified insurance physician. The certification is given by a subsection of the Finnish Medical Association. The standards have also been criticized.

==== High Court of Impeachment ====
The High Court of Impeachment (valtakunnanoikeus, more literally 'Court of the Realm') may be convened for cases dealing with criminal charges (for an offence in office) against the President of the Republic, a justice of the Supreme Court, a member of the Government (a minister), the Chancellor of Justice or the Ombudsman of Parliament. The court has convened only four times since its formation in 1922.

Five of the members serve ex officio: the Chief Justices of the two supreme courts and the three most senior Chief Justices of the Courts of Appeal. Five of the members are elected by the Parliament at the beginning of each parliamentary term. The term of the parliamentary members is the same as the term of the Parliament.

The High Court of Impeachment follows criminal procedure and may use all means available to a District Court. The verdict of the Court is final. The President of Finland may not pardon persons convicted by the High Court of Impeachment. Only the Court itself can reverse or vacate one of its previous verdicts.

=== Military justice ===
The service-related criminal cases against military persons serving in the Finnish Defence Forces or the Finnish Border Guard are handled by the civilian courts with some modifications to the usual procedure. The usual forum for the proceedings is the local district court, with a civilian District Judge as a chairperson and two military persons as other members. One of the military members is a commissioned officer and the other belongs to some other personnel group of the military. Both are appointed on a permanent basis by the court of appeals. Unlike in civilian cases, the court may decide to impose a disciplinary measure if the punishment would normally be a fine. The measures available are two types of warning, additional service (1–5 shifts), confinement to garrison (1–15 days), 1–30 disciplinary fines, or confinement to quarters (1–30 days).

The military criminal cases are investigated by the Defence Forces, by the Border Guard or by the civilian police and the case is brought to court by the civilian district prosecutor. The proceedings take place according to the normal procedure, but the majority option will become the verdict of the court only if it is supported by the District Judge or is milder than his/hers. The District Court where the military unit of the accused is permanently or temporarily located has the jurisdiction. In case of military crimes committed by servicemen in international crisis management duties, the District Court of Helsinki has the jurisdiction.

The appeals are considered by the Helsinki Court of Appeals with two military members who must have at least major's rank and who are appointed by the Supreme Court. The cases against officers with at least major's rank are always handled by the court of appeals acting as a court first instance. If the Supreme Court considers a military case, it will have two military members who are general officers appointed by the President of Republic.

In addition to the judicial proceedings, the military may use disciplinary means in minor infractions. A serviceperson has a right to appeal to the District Court against the disciplinary action. The disciplinary actions available depend on the person using discipline. The lowest servicemember empowered to use disciplinary means is the company executive officer, while the full range of disciplinary punishments is only available to brigade commanders. The disciplinary means available are the same as for the court with the exception of confinement to quarters, which may be sentenced only by a court.

The non-service-related crimes of servicemembers do not fall into the jurisdiction of the courts with military members. All crimes where the victim is a civilian are considered non-service-related. Only certain classes of crimes may be considered service-related, even if the victim is a military person or the state. For example, violent crimes, larceny, embezzlement and robbery may fall to military jurisdiction, but sexual crimes, traffic infractions, war crimes, treason, espionage, most economic crimes, drug offences and crimes against the prohibition of weapons of mass destruction are always considered civilian crimes. If a military and a civilian crime are committed in direct conjunction, both crimes fall into the civilian jurisdiction and are investigated by the police and the normal civilian courts. However, a minor civilian crime may fall into the military jurisdiction, if it is committed in direct conjunction with a clearly more aggravated military crime. For instance, stealing a military vehicle (a military crime) and driving it under influence (a civilian crime) would fall under military jurisdiction.

During a war, the Finnish law gives an option of founding Courts Martial to handle military crimes. The Courts Martial would be founded by the Government. The Chief Judge of a Court Martial would be a legally trained person elected by the Supreme Court, while the two other Judges would be servicemembers elected by a Court of Appels. One of the Judges would be a commissioned officer, while the other would be a warrant officer, non-commissioned officer or a rank-and-file servicemember. The judgments of the Court Martial could be appealed to Courts of Appeal. Civilian personnel of the Defence Forces and the Border Guard would also be subject to the military criminal legislation and to the jurisdiction of courts handling military crimes. In areas where the civilian courts of law have ceased functioning, the Courts Martial have jurisdiction in all criminal cases.

== Enforcement ==
Enforcement of judgements is the responsibility of several agencies, depending on the judgement. The Criminal Sanctions Agency (Finnish: Rikosseuraamuslaitos, Swedish: Brottspåföljdsmyndigheten, abbreviated RISE) is a state agency that enforces all prison and community service sentences. The police can hold individuals in arrest for four days, after which there must be a court decision to continue detention. Financial sanctions such as distraint and garnishment are enforced by local state officials (vouti) nominated by the National Administrative Office for Enforcement (valtakunnanvoudinvirasto). A district is managed by a kihlakunnanvouti, who leads a team of professional distrainers (ulosottomies). The office of vouti was originally a royal plenipotentiary, then evolved towards specialization in financial enforcement. The Finnish Police enforces miscellaneous decisions such as immigration judgements, i.e. there are no separate agencies for immigration, drug, alcohol or firearms enforcement, all of which fall under the jurisdiction of the police. Law enforcement agencies can also issue summary fines such as speeding tickets, but they can always be disputed in court. The Finnish Defence Forces can enforce disciplinary sentences conducted at barracks.

== See also ==
- Law of Finland
