= Supreme Court of Finland =

Highest court of civil and criminal jurisdiction in Finland

- Korkein oikeus - Högsta domstolen
- The official insignia of the Supreme Court
- Interactive map of Supreme Court of Finland
- Jurisdiction: Finland
- Location: Helsinki
- Composition method: Appointed by the President of Finland
- Authorised by: Constitution of Finland
- Appeals from: Courts of Appeal Market Court (Civil law questions) Insurance Court (Limited)
- Number of positions: At least 15
- Annual budget: 8,96 million € (2022)
- Language: Finnish and Swedish
- Type of tribunal: Civil and criminal
- Website: Supreme Court of Finland

President
- Currently: Tatu Leppänen
- Since: 1 September 2019

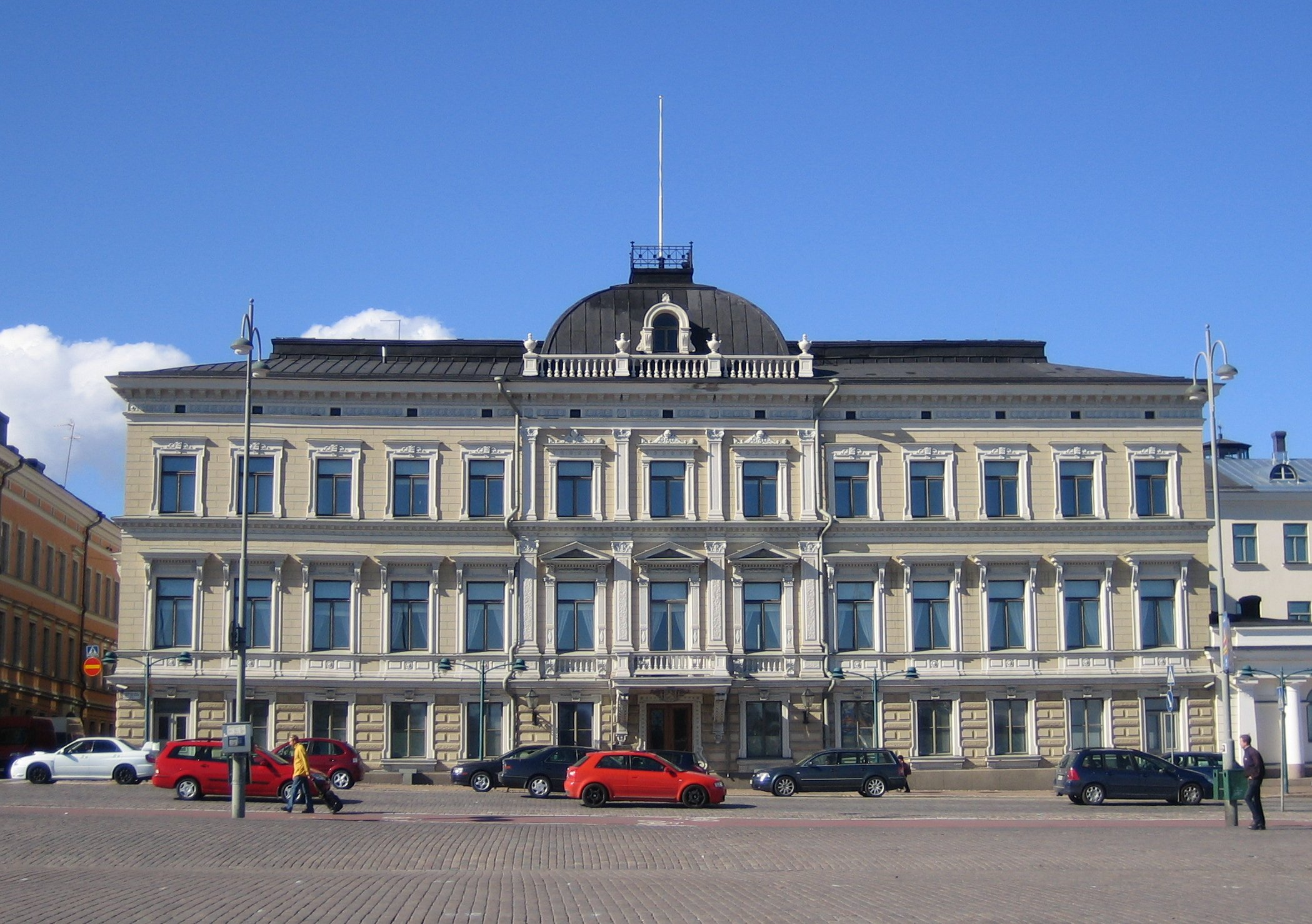
Court house of the Supreme Court

The Supreme Court of Finland (Finnish: korkein oikeus [ˈkorkei̯n ˈoi̯keus], abbreviated as KKO; Swedish: högsta domstolen, abbreviated as HD), located in Helsinki, is the court of last resort for cases within the private law of Finland (that is, civil and criminal cases). The Court's counterpart is the Supreme Administrative Court, which is the court of last resort for cases within the administrative law.

The Supreme Court consists of a President and at minimum 15, currently 18, other Justices, usually working in five-judge panels. The most important function of the Supreme Court is to rule on important points of law in cases which are significant for the entire legal order, guiding the administering of justice in future cases. Decisions of the Courts of Appeal (Finnish: hovioikeudet, Swedish: hovrätter), as well as certain decisions of the Insurance Court and Market Court may be appealed against to the Supreme Court, provided that it grants leave to appeal. . In the rare criminal cases where a Court of Appeal acts as the court of first instance, the leave to appeal is not needed. (Note: Cases of espionage, treason and criminal cases involving high civil servants or officers of at least major's rank fall into this category.)

The Supreme Court may annul final decisions of courts, other than the High Court of Impeachment, on the grounds provided in Chapter 31 of the Code of Judicial Procedure. The Court also handles complaints concerning errors in procedure. In some cases the Court may restore the right of appeal after the expiration of a specified period of time.

The Supreme Court gives advice to the President in cases concerning the right to grant a pardon, and to the Ministry of Justice in cases concerning extradition. It may provide legal opinions on Government Bills at different stages of the legislative process, and the President may consult it on Bills passed by Parliament before ratifying them. The Supreme Court may also approach the President on its own initiative, and propose enactment of a new Parliament Act or an amendment to an existing Act.

The Supreme Court mainly relies on written evidence when deciding on a case. The Court may, however, hold oral hearings in which the parties, witnesses and experts are heard in person. The oral hearings are public.

== Precedents ==
The precedents are usually created in cases for which the applicable Acts of Parliament and decrees do not provide a clear solution for a question of law, or in which there is room for interpretation. Approximately 150 such precedents are decided each year.

Under the Finnish legal system, a judicial precedent is not binding. The role of the court is in the constitution defined as supervising the application of law in its field. As such, Courts of Appeal and even District Courts may depart from earlier decisions made by the Supreme Court, for example when the social circumstances have considerably changed. In practice, however, precedents of the Supreme Court are followed in cases arising after the precedent has been created and involving a similar point of law. This is attributed among other things to the ability of the court to overturn rulings, which grants it's ruling considerable guiding force. The Supreme Court may also itself depart from its earlier precedents, provided that the case is considered by an enlarged chamber (11 members) or by a full court.

Precedents in the Supreme Court cases are published every six months. In addition they are available in at the Finlex database. The panel of the Court deciding the precedents also makes the decisions concerning their publication.

The title of a judgment briefly sets forth the point of law to which the precedent applied and which constitutes the reason for its publication. In cases containing to precedents, the Supreme Court will also have to take a position on questions other than those outlined in the title. However, such positions are like any other judgments of the Court, which do not create precedents. A precedent contributes to the development of national law by providing consistency in case law. The objective is that courts throughout the country interpret the law in a uniform manner and apply legal principles by means of consistent assessment and deliberation. Precedents are also used in research, for the purpose of analysing the contents of existing law.

== Proceedings ==
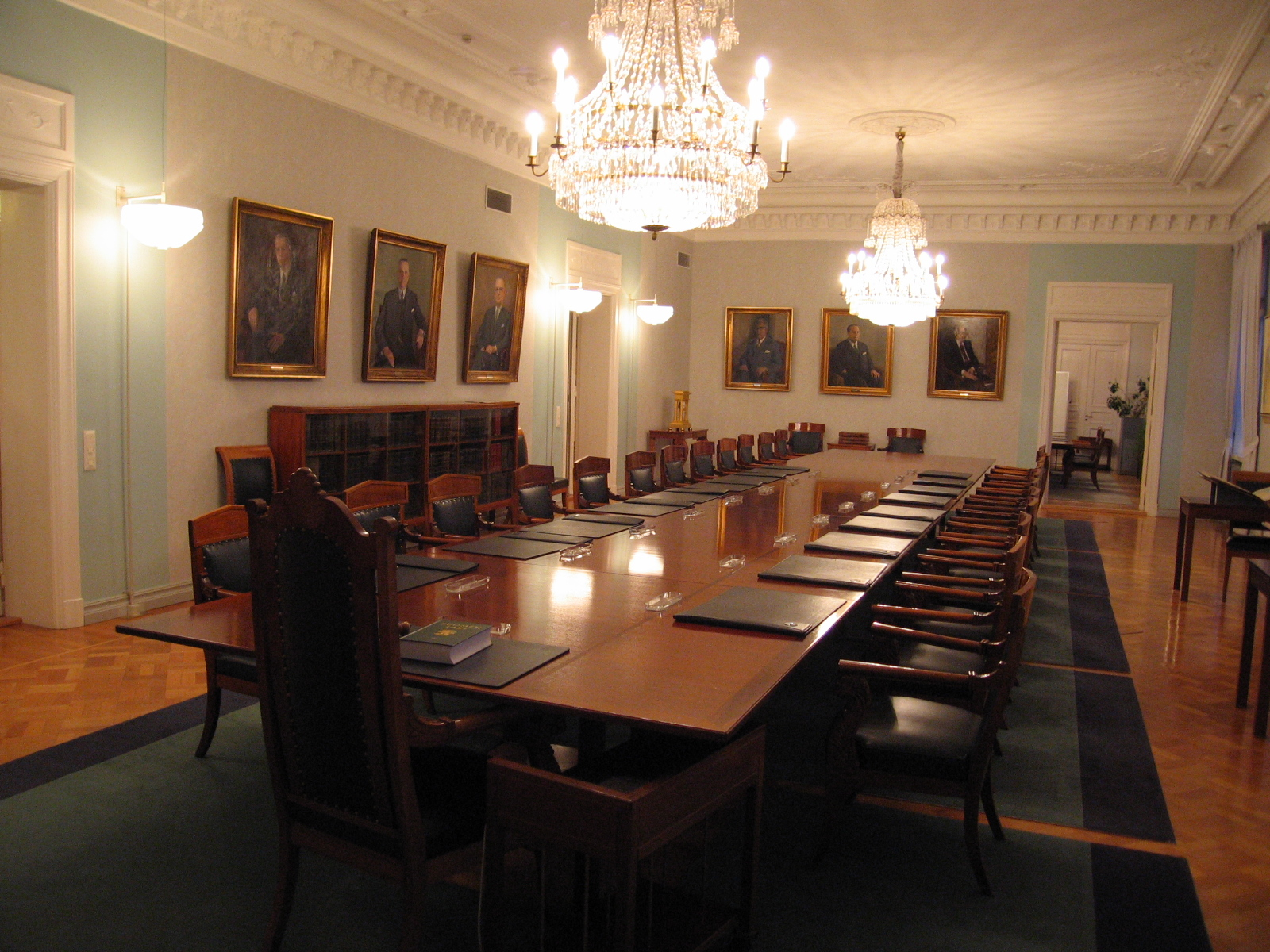
The plenary session chamber of the Court

In cases before the Supreme Court where leave to appeal must first be granted before an appeal is allowed from a decision of a lower court, the proceedings before the Court have two stages: decision on admissibility and decision on the merits of the case. The admissibility of the case, the granting of leave to appeal, must be decided on by two members of the court upon presentation by a referendary. This means that the two members make the decision on the basis of the preliminary work and opinion of the referendary. Under certain circumstances, the decision on admissibility may be made by three members of the Court instead of two. In case an application for leave to appeal is rejected, the case will be closed and the judgment of the court of appeal will remain final.

Should leave to appeal be granted, the merits of the case, the allegations presented in the appeal petition, is decided on by at least five members of the Court. Also the decision on the merits is made upon presentation by a referendary, meaning that the referendary prepares the case and is partly responsible for the outcome of the case. Apart from documentary evidence and applicable legislation, the sources of law on which the decision of the Supreme Court may be based include case law, the legislative history of Acts of Parliament, textbooks and international conventions.

If a question of law to be resolved involves significant principles or if the Supreme Court wishes to depart from an earlier precedent, the case shall be decided on by a grand chamber (11 members) or by a full court (all the members). Administrative matters, including the appointment of judges, shall be decided on by a full court.

Referendaries of the Supreme Court prepare cases for the Court and present them in the hearing. The referendaries are also mainly responsible for contacting the parties to the case and for the administrative work relating to hearings, as well as for sending court documents to the parties. The referendaries are to a certain extent specialised in different areas of law.

The Supreme Court mainly relies on written evidence when deciding on a case. The Court may, however, hold oral hearings in which the parties, witnesses and experts are heard in person. The oral hearings are public. The Supreme Court may also decide to arrange an on-site inspection, for example, of a place which is the subject matter of the court proceedings.

== Leave to appeal ==
When the requirement of leave to appeal was introduced at the beginning of 1980, the position of the Supreme Court as the court changed considerably. The earlier system of appeal with a hierarchy of three court instances was replaced by a system with two instances: a decision of a court of first instance may usually be appealed against to one superior court. Thereby the courts of appeal are the highest instance for most court proceedings, whereas the role of the Supreme Court clearly is that of creating precedents. Leave to appeal is also required for appeal against decisions of specialised courts.

=== Grounds for leave to appeal ===
The preconditions to the granting of leave to appeal are as provided in Chapter 30, section 3 (1) of the Code of Judicial Procedure, under which the Supreme Court may only grant leave to appeal on the following grounds:

- a decision of the Supreme Court is necessary for the application of law in identical or similar cases or for the consistency of case law;
- an error in procedure or other error has taken place in the case, which by virtue of law requires that the decision be quashed;
- there are other weighty reasons for granting leave to appeal.

The purpose of the requirement of leave to appeal is to enable the Supreme Court to concentrate on guiding judicial practice through precedent. Therefore, the first alternative ground for the granting of leave to appeal is the most important one. A precedent may relate to the application of law in identical or similar cases or to the consistency of case law. In the first-mentioned case, the precedent provides guidance for resolving similar questions of law in the future. In the latter case, the precedent provides guidance for such practice of lower courts as is inconsistent or contradicts the case law of the Supreme Court. The granting of leave to appeal on the grounds that the case creates a precedent always suggests that the decision of the Supreme Court has general legal relevance.

The other grounds for the granting of leave to appeal are seldom applied. They are mainly applied when there is need to rectify a clearly erroneous, unreasonable or unfair court decision.

A decision on the granting of leave to appeal is made upon application. The application must indicate the grounds on which leave to appeal should be granted: whether the case creates precedent, involves an error in procedure or there are other weighty reasons. The application must further indicate the reasons on the basis of which the applicant considers that there are grounds for granting leave to appeal. In brief, the application for leave to appeal must set out the grounds.

== Members ==
The President and other members (justices) of the Supreme Court are appointed by the President of the Republic. As of 1 September 2019, the President of the Supreme Court is Tatu Leppänen.

The justices of the Supreme Court have usually earlier experience from different branches of the legal profession, most often in courts of law, but also in the drafting of legislation, academic positions and as legal practitioners.

According to law, the Supreme Court must have a President and at least 15 members. The Court now consists of 18 members. The average age of the current justices, while having been appointed, is 48. Like many other Finnish employees, the justices must retire at 68. Otherwise, they enjoy the constitutional right to remain in office, unless they are impeached by the High Court of Impeachment or found medically incapable by the Supreme Court. The referendaries enjoy a similar constitutional right to remain in office, but their work-related offences are handled by the Court of Appeals of Helsinki, instead of the High Court of Impeachment.

=== Current members ===
Member	In office (dd.mm.yyyy)
Tatu Leppänen (President)	1.9.2016-, as president 1.9.2019-
Jukka Sippo	1.1.2008-
Ari Kantor	1.5.2010-
Tuula Pynnä	1.8.2012-
Mika Huovila	1.4.2013-
Tuomo Antila	1.9.2015-
Kirsti Uusitalo	1.1.2017-
Lena Engstrand	1.1.2017-
Mika Ilveskero	1.9.2017-
Juha Mäkelä	1.1.2018-
Asko Välimaa	1.4.2018-
Eva Tammi-Salminen	1.8.2018-
Jussi Tapani	1.8.2018-
Timo Ojala	1.9.2019-
Alice Guimares-Purokoski	1.9.2019- (as acting until 31.10.2021)
Tuija Turpeinen	1.3.2021- (as acting until 31.8.2022)
Pekka Pulkkinen	1.6.2022- (as acting until 31.12.2022)
Kaarlo Hakamies	1.1.2023- (as acting until 31.5.2024)
Pasi Pölönen	1.4.2023- (as acting until 31.12.2023)
Heli Melander	1.8.2024-

=== Presidents ===
President	In Office
Tatu Leppänen	1 September 2019–Incumbent
Timo Esko	1 January 2016 – 31 August 2019
Pauliine Koskelo	1 January 2006 – 31 December 2015
Leif Sevón	1 January 2002 – 31 December 2005
Olavi Heinonen	1 October 1989 – 31 December 2001
Curt Olsson	1 December 1975 – 30 September 1989
Antti Hannikainen	17 June 1964 – 11 October 1975
Matti Piipponen	8 February 1963 – 17 June 1964
Toivo Tarjanne	30 September 1950 – 8 February 1963
Oskar Möller	5 December 1945 – 18 September 1950
Hjalmar Neovius	21.3.1940–5 December 1945
Frans Pehkonen	8.3.1929–10.3.1940
Julius Grotenfelt	11 December 1920 – 8 March 1929
August Nybergh	1 October 1918 – 5 December 1920

== See also ==
- Constitution of Finland
