= National Administrative Office for Enforcement =

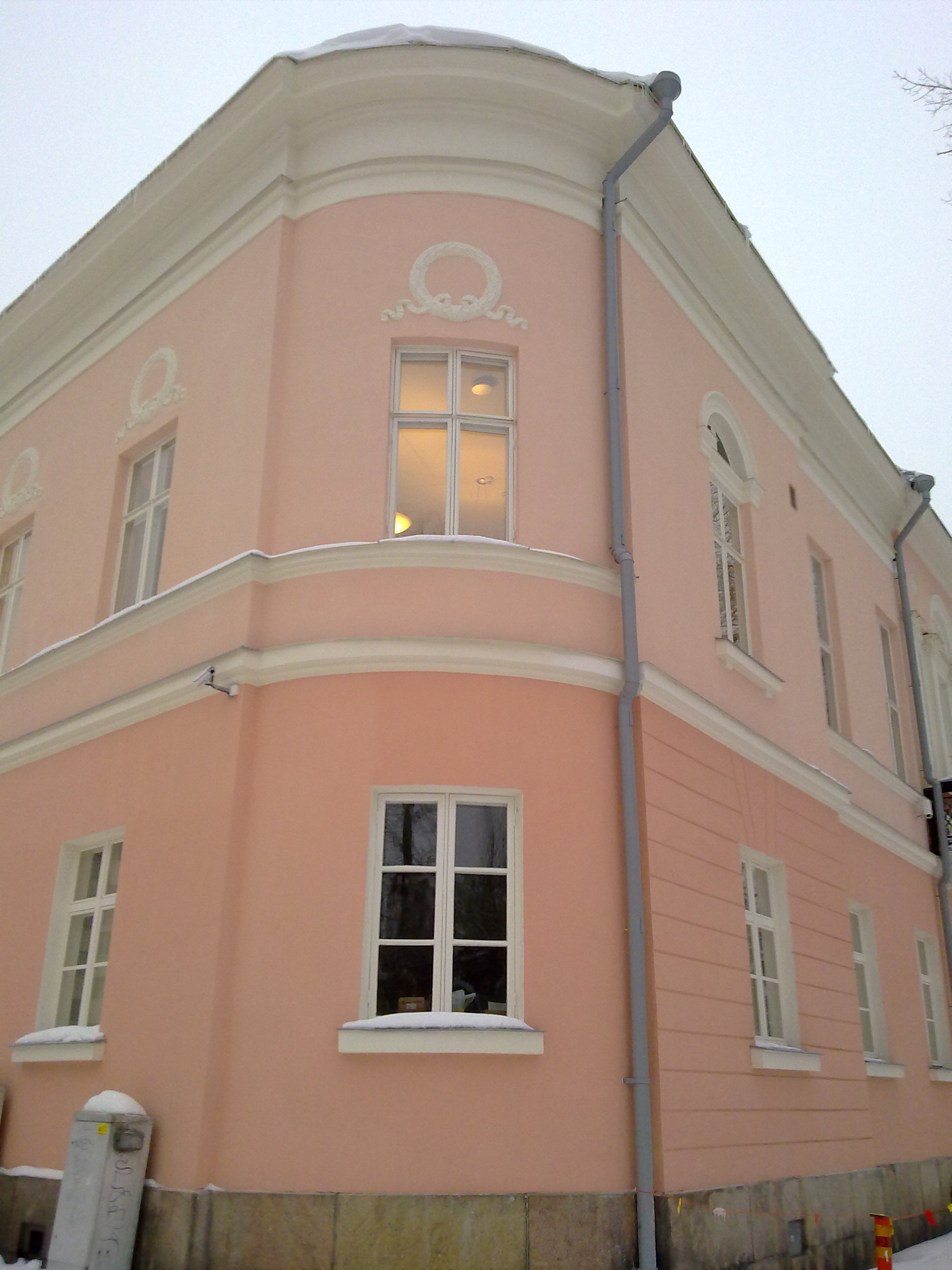
Valtakunnanvoudinvirasto in Turku, located at the corner of Kauppiaskatu and Läntinen Rantakatu by the Aurajoki river.

National Administrative Office for Enforcement (Finnish: Valtakunnanvoudinvirasto; Swedish: Riksfogdeämbetet) was a central agency under the Finnish Ministry of Justice that oversaw enforcement operations in Finland from 2010 to 2020.

The agency was led by the Chief Enforcement Officer, Juhani Toukola. The agency was responsible for handling complaints and claims for damages related to enforcement authorities, managing the finances and personnel of the enforcement system, and overseeing and developing enforcement operations. It also appointed district enforcement officers.

Valtakunnanvoudinvirasto began its operations at the beginning of 2010 in Turku. The agency had approximately 20 employees. Before its establishment, these functions were handled by the enforcement unit of the Ministry of Justice and the legal administration departments of regional state administrative agencies.

The agency was dissolved on December 1, 2020, when it was merged with regional enforcement agencies to form the nationwide Enforcement Authority of Finland.

== Gallery ==
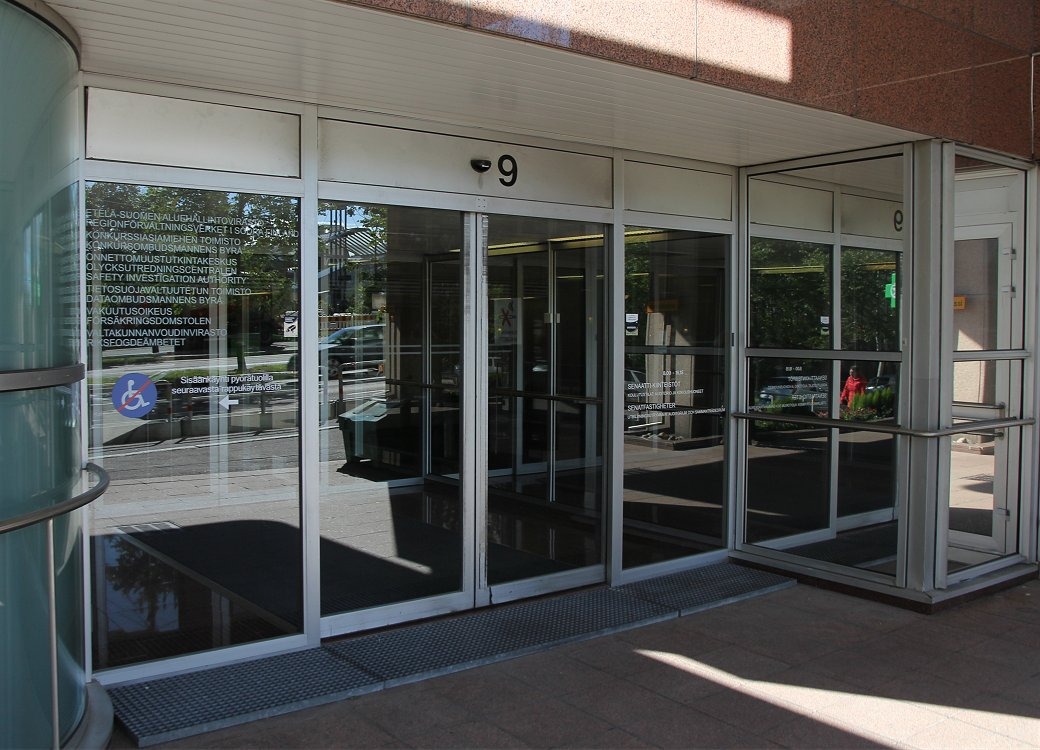
The Helsinki office of Valtakunnanvoudinvirasto at Ratapihantie 9, Pasila, Helsinki (2016).

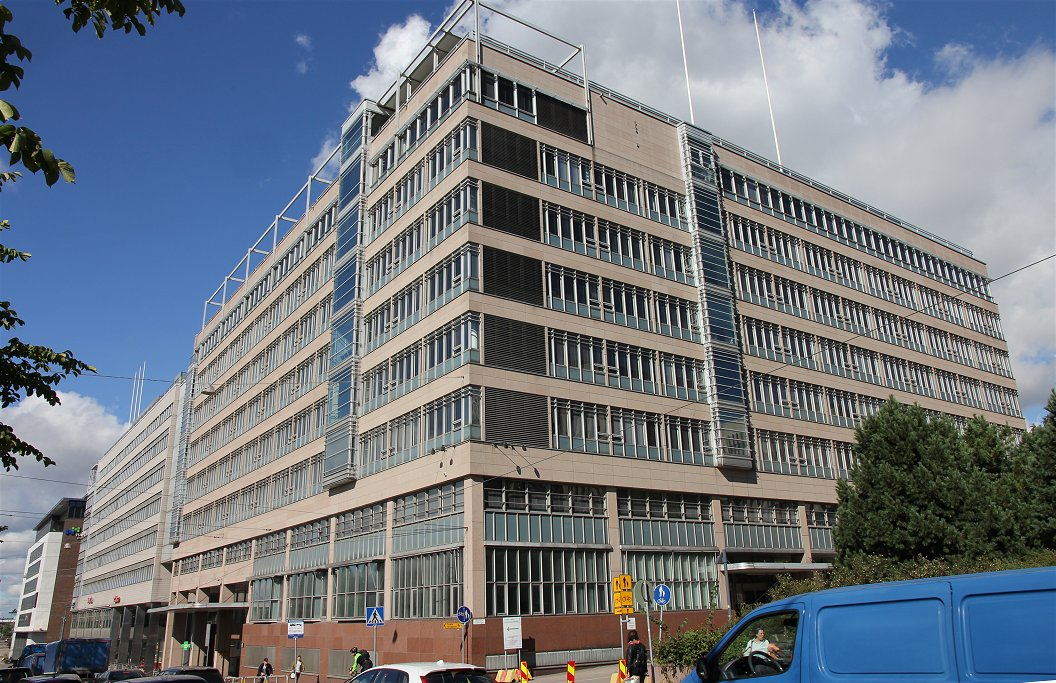
Facade of the office building at Ratapihantie 9, owned by Senaatti-kiinteistöt, in Pasila, Helsinki.
