= Constitution of Finland =

Supreme source of national law of Finland

Constitution of The Republic of Finland

Overview
- Original title: Suomen perustuslaki Finlands Grundlag
- Jurisdiction: Finland
- Date effective: 1 March 2000

Full text
- Constitution of Finland at Wikisource

The Constitution of Finland (Finnish: Suomen perustuslaki; Swedish: Finlands grundlag) is the supreme source of national law in Finland. It defines the basis, structures and organisation of government, the relationship between the different constitutional organs, and lays out the fundamental rights of Finnish citizens, and individuals in general. The original Constitution Act was enacted in 1919, soon after Finland declared its independence in 1917. The current draft of the Constitution came into force on 1 March 2000.

== Historical background and reform ==
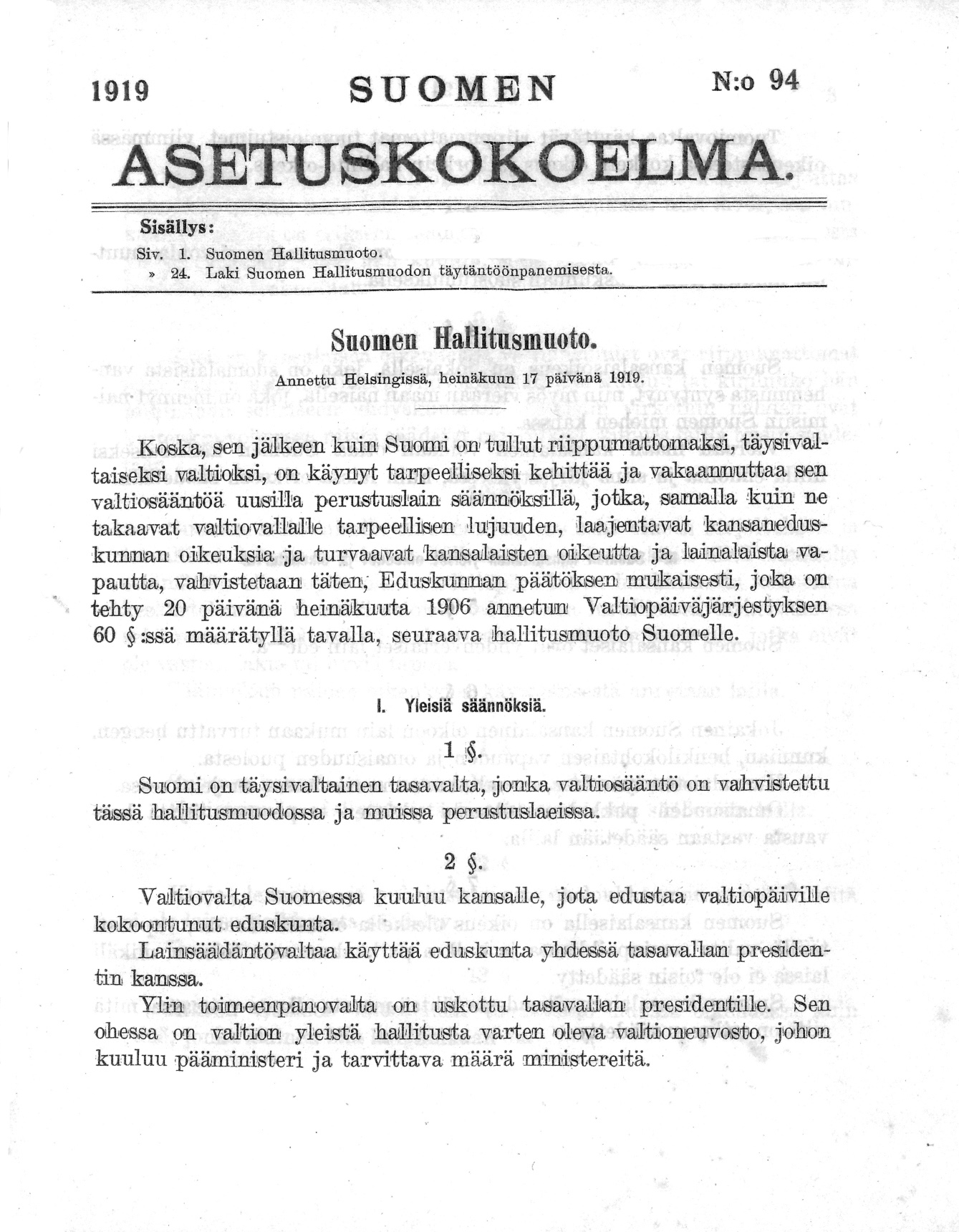
First page of the Finnish Constitution Act of 1919 in Finnish

Finland's current constitutional provisions are enshrined in a single statute: the Constitution of Finland (731/1999).

Before the enshrinement, the Finnish constitutional provisions were divided between four separate statutes, which all had a constitutional status; the Constitution Act of 1919, also known in English as the Instrument of Government, (Finnish: Suomen hallitusmuoto; Swedish: Regeringsformen för Finland) which came into force on 17 July 1919, the Parliament Act of 1928 (Finnish: valtiopäiväjärjestys; Swedish: riksdagsordningen), the Ministerial Responsibility Act of 1922 (Finnish: laki eduskunnan oikeudesta tarkastaa valtioneuvoston jäsenten ja oikeuskanslerin sekä eduskunnan oikeusasiamiehen virkatointen lainmukaisuutta, short title ministerivastuulaki; Swedish: Lag om rätt för riksdagen att granska lagenligheten av statsrådsmedlemmarnas och justitiekanslerns samt riksdagens justitieombudsmans ämbetsåtgärder) and the Act on the High Court of Impeachment of 1922 (Finnish: laki valtakunnanoikeudesta; Swedish: Lag om riksrätten). All these statutes were merged into a single constitution and repealed with the passage thereof.

The fundamental principles of the Constitution Act of 1919 and the Parliament Act of 1906, amended in 1928, remained unchanged during the first fifty years of Finnish independence, as there was little pressure or need for any amendments to the Constitution Act. However, this did not prevent the Constitution from adapting to the changing needs of the day. The flexibility of the Finnish Constitution is due to the use of "exceptive laws", a distinctive feature of the Finnish system: instead of amending or changing the Constitution, an act may be passed as an ad hoc exception to it. Such an exceptive law does not become part of the Constitution and it may be repealed like an ordinary act. Exceptive laws were formerly much used, even to the point of threatening to undermine respect for Constitutional provisions. Today, their use is limited.

The first major constitutional reform came in 1983, with the re-writing of many important provisions governing parliamentary procedure, mostly in the Parliament Act. However, the most extensive and important reforms came in 1987, when provisions on the holding of consultative referendums were added to the Constitution. The indirect form of electing the President of the Republic via an Electoral College was replaced by a system which combined the Electoral College with direct election, and the provisions governing the postponement of ordinary legislation were amended by shortening the period for which a bill could be postponed.

In 1991, the direct popular election of the President was introduced, with provision for a second ballot where necessary. The new system was used for the first time in 1994. The President's term of office was also limited to two consecutive terms of six years, and the President's powers were limited to only dissolving Parliament on receipt of a reasoned request from the Prime Minister and having first consulted the Speaker and the party groups in Parliament. The 1991 reform also amended the provisions in the Constitution Act and the Parliament Act relating to State finances.

The extensive reform of Basic Rights in Chapter II of the Constitution Act came into force in August 1995, and the remaining powers of a one third minority to postpone ordinary legislation to the next Parliament were abolished, marking the final transition to majority Parliamentarism in respect to ordinary legislation.

In the 1990s, the need to integrate and update the constitutional legislation was seen as urgent. For instance, while in most other European countries constitutional provisions are all contained within a single constitutional act, in Finland, they were fragmented and contained across several acts.

The process of constitutional reform began in the late 1990s, after Finland's accession to the European Union, partly because of the arguments which had emerged between the Parliament and the President when arrangements were being made for decision-making in European affairs, such as whether the President should participate in the meetings of the European Council together with the Prime Minister.

In 1995, a working group of experts, called the Constitution 2000 Working Group, was appointed to examine the need to consolidate and update the constitutional legislation. The Working Group proposed that all constitutional provisions be brought together into a single statute and concluded that the most important questions of constitutional law to be addressed in the reform were the reduction of the scope of constitutional regulation, the development of relations between the highest organs of government, the clarification of questions of power and responsibility in international affairs, and constitutional recognition of European Union membership. The Working Group also drew up a proposal for the structure of the new Constitution.

After the Working Group had delivered its report, in 1996 the Government appointed the Constitution 2000 Commission to draft a proposal for a new, integrated Constitution to come into force on 1 March 2000. The Commission was instructed to draft its proposal for a new Constitution to replace the four existing constitutional laws in the form of a Government bill. The Commission completed its work on 17 June 1997, and during 1998, the bill was considered by the Constitutional Law Committee, which finally produced its unanimous report on the bill in January 1999. On 12 February, Parliament gave its approval for the Committee's proposal for the new Constitution to be left in abeyance until after the parliamentary elections. The new Parliament elected in March 1999 approved the new Constitution in June that year and it was ratified by the President of the Republic.

The Constitution has since been amended a number of times, notably in 2011 to allow bills to be introduced in Parliament by popular petition and in 2017 to expand the access of police and intelligence services to private communications.

== Main provisions ==
=== Structure ===
The official text of the constitution consists of 131 Sections, divided into 13 Chapters, as follows:

1. Fundamental provisions
2. Basic rights and liberties
3. Parliament and the Representatives
4. Parliamentary activity
5. The President of the Republic and the Government
6. Legislation
7. State finances
8. International relations
9. Administration of justice
10. Supervision of legality
11. Administration and self-government
12. National defence
13. Final provisions

=== Fundamental provisions and basic rights ===
The opening chapter on fundamental provisions continues the affirmation of Finland's status as a sovereign Republic, the inviolability of human dignity and the rights of the individual, and the sovereignty of the Finnish people. It also affirms the principle of representative democracy and the position of Parliament as the highest organ of government, the separation of powers, the independence of the courts, and the principle of parliamentary government. The provisions for constitutional rights closely mirror the European convention on human rights, including the educational, social and economic rights in addition to political liberties. The international human rights obligations of Finland are set as the highest legal norm of the law, even above the constitution.

=== Provisions on the Constitutional Organs ===
The Constitution establishes a government under a parliamentary system. It provides for a directly elected President of the Republic, a Government comprising the Prime Minister and the Ministers who form the Government (Chapter 5) the Parliament of Finland (Chapter 3). It also establishes an independent judiciary and two judicial systems: one general, and the other administrative.

==== Parliament ====
One of the main goals of the constitutional reform process was to move Finland away from a semi-presidential system and further in the direction of a parliamentary system of government. Accordingly, the new Constitution strengthens the position of Parliament as the highest organ of government and makes it easier for the legislature to carry out its work — this despite the fact that the new Constitution's provisions on the organization and procedures of Parliament contain no fundamental changes in terms of content, and the legal provisions on Parliament and Representatives remain largely unchanged. Importantly, under the new Constitution, the Parliament elects and appoints a new Prime Minister and the President appoints the other ministers on the advice of the Prime Minister; under the old system, appointing the entire cabinet was a power vested in the President. While the decision to dissolve the Parliament and call an unscheduled election is still made by the President as head of state, the President may no longer do so at their own discretion but instead only on the advice of the Prime Minister.

Under the Parliament Act, Parliament has traditionally been entitled to receive from the Government and the relevant ministries whatever information it needs to carry out its functions, while the parliamentary committees have enjoyed a similar right to be provided with information and reports on matters within their purview. The new Constitution extends Parliament's right to be informed by giving individual Members of Parliament the right to receive information from authorities which they need to carry out their functions, provided the information concerned is not classed as secret and is not related to the preparation of the Government's budget proposal.

The new Constitution rationalizes and tightens up Parliament's legislative procedures in respect of the readings of a bill in plenary session following preparation in committee, reducing the previous three readings to two.

Parliamentary supervision of the Government and of the overall administrative machinery of government is to be enhanced by transferring the National Audit Office, which monitors management of the public finances and compliance with the Government budget, from its previous position under the Ministry of Finance to become an independent office working in conjunction with Parliament.

A new Procedure of Parliament, which supplements the provisions on Parliament contained in the Constitution, came into force at the same time as the new Constitution on 1 March 2000.

==== The President of the Republic and the Government ====
The main changes in the new Constitution relate to the constitutional regulation of decision-making by the President of the Republic and the formation of the Government. Regulation of presidential decision-making procedures are specified more precisely, while the Government, responsible to Parliament and dependent on the confidence of Parliament, is given a greater role in presidential decision-making. The most notable change was the transfer of the final decision on the introduction and withdrawal of Government bills from the President of the Republic to the Government, this including bills in the area of foreign affairs.

In relation to the formation of the Government, the provisions of the new Constitution transfer the appointment of the Prime Minister from the President to Parliament. The new Constitution thus marked the end of the President's leading role in the formation of the Government. The President now only takes a prominent role when the parliamentary groups are unable to reach agreement on a suitable basis and programme for the Government, and on a suitable candidate for Prime Minister.

=== Delegation ===
§ 80 provides that an issue can be governed by a Decree only if this re-delegation is explicitly allowed in an Act. However, the principles governing the rights and obligations of private individuals and the other matters that under the Constitution are of a legislative nature shall be governed by Acts. § 80, in essence, sets up the boundaries on how the Parliament may give up its legislative power.

The Constitution, indeed, delegates several issues to be governed by ordinary Acts. These laws are not considered constitutional laws, although they concern constitutional rights. An example is the universal obligation to participate in national defence which is provided in § 127 in two sentences, both of which delegate to regular legislation: Every Finnish citizen is obligated to participate or assist in national defence, as provided by an Act. Provisions on the right to exemption, on grounds of conscience, from participation in military national defence are laid down by an Act.

== Criticisms ==
The constitutional system in Finland has been criticized for missing any de facto mechanism of independent constitutional review, as well as failing to adequately guarantee separation of powers. The constitutionality of laws is not determined by the judiciary, but it is, instead, reviewed by the Parliament's own Constitutional Law Committee that consists of MPs. This structure is, however, not unusual among democratic nations. The Netherlands, Sweden and Switzerland are other such countries where constitutional review is performed by the legislature itself or a committee within it.

The current Finnish Constitution expressly (section 106) directs the courts to give precedence to the provisions of the Constitution if they are in an evident conflict with provisions of ordinary laws in some particular case, but the courts may not strike down Acts or pronounce on their constitutionality. The old constitutional acts also directed the Supreme Court and the Supreme Administrative Court to request, if needed, the explication or amendment of an Act or a Decree, but this provision has been repealed and the responsibility for maintaining the constitutionality of the laws now rests completely with the Parliament.

== See also ==
- Constitution
- Constitutional law
- Constitutional economics
- Constitutionalism
