= Ministry of Justice (Finland) =

Government ministry of Finland

- Finnish: oikeusministeriö Swedish: justitieministeriet
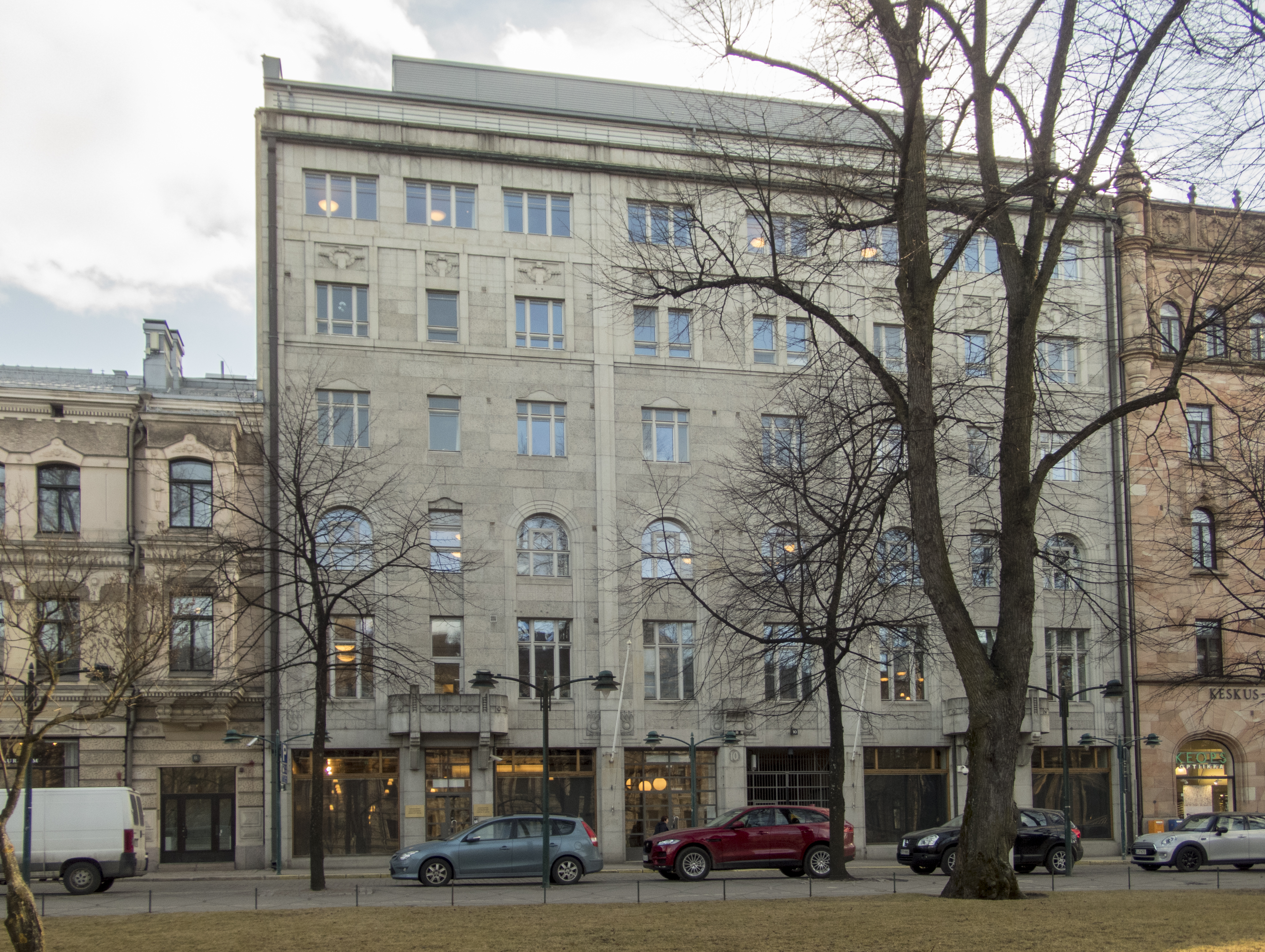
- The former building of the ministry at Eteläesplanadi 10

Ministry overview
- Formed: August 1809
- Jurisdiction: Finnish Government
- Headquarters: Meritullinkatu 10, Helsinki
- Annual budget: €0.941 billion (2018)
- Minister responsible: Leena Meri, Minister of Justice
- Website: oikeusministerio.fi/en/

The Ministry of Justice (Finnish: oikeusministeriö [ˈoi̯keusˌministeriø], Swedish: justitieministeriet) is one of the 12 ministries which comprise the Finnish Government. Headed by the Minister of Justice, it is responsible for maintaining the legal safeguards necessary for the successful operation of democracy and fundamental rights of the inhabitants of Finland.

The ministry's budget for 2018 is €940,743,000. It has 261 direct employees.

The drafting of the most central laws, the functioning of the judicial system, and the enforcement of sentences belong to the jurisdiction of the Ministry of Justice. Sentences are enforced by the Criminal Sanctions Agency (Finnish: Rikosseuraamuslaitos, Swedish: Brottspåföljdsmyndigheten), which administers the country's imprisonment and rehabilitation system. The Ministry of Justice of Finland might oversee the administration of justice in Åland.

== Organization ==
The Ministry of Justice and its administrative sector are headed by the Minister of Justice, assisted by the Permanent Secretary. The incumbent Minister of Justice is Leena Meri.

The Ministry of Justice has four departments: Department for Democracy and Public Law, Department for Private Law and Administration of Justice, Department for Criminal Policy and Criminal Law, and Department for Administration and Oversight. In addition, there is the Management Support and Core Services, which is outside the departmental division.

=== Administrative sector ===
The administrative sector of the ministry consists of the courts, Criminal Sanctions Agency and several other offices and boards (below):

- Legal Register Centre
- Office of the Bankruptcy Ombudsman
- Office of the Data Protection Ombudsman
- National Council for Crime Prevention
- Safety Investigation Authority
- European Institute for Crime Prevention and Control (HEUNI, affiliated with the United Nations)
- Office of the Ombudsman for Children
- Ombudsman for Equality
- Office of the Non-discrimination Ombudsman

=== Departments ===
==== Department for Democracy and Public Law ====
The Department for Democracy and Public Law is responsible for tasks related to fundamental rights policy, legislation in the field of public law, and implementation of electoral and other participatory rights. The department promotes equality, good relations between different ethnic groups, and realisation of linguistic rights. It is also responsible for coordinating Saami affairs.

The department drafts legislation in the fields of constitutional law, administrative law, administrative judicial procedure, data protection, and openness of government activities. The department is responsible for Åland affairs and expert duties related to EU law.

The department is also responsible for the performance guidance of the Office of the Data Protection Ombudsman, the Office of the Ombudsman for Children, the Office of the Ombudsman for Equality, and the Office of the Non-Discrimination Ombudsman.

The Department for Democracy and Public Law consists of four units: Democracy and Elections, EU Law and Data Protection, Autonomy and Equality, and Public Law.

==== Department for Administration and Oversight ====
The Department for Administration and Oversight is responsible for the operational and financial planning and reporting, consistent performance guidance and development of information management in the administrative branch of the Ministry of Justice. The department is also responsible for HR matters at the Ministry and for the obligations that the Ministry has in its capacity as an employer in the administrative branch. Furthermore, responsibilities related to data management, data security and data protection at the Ministry belong to the department.

There are three units in the Department for Administration and Oversight: Human Resources, Oversight, and Information Management. In addition to these, there is a separate function, Assistant Services.

==== Department for Criminal Policy and Criminal Law ====
The Department for Criminal Policy and Criminal Law is responsible for planning and developing criminal policy, crime prevention and the criminal sanctions system. The department drafts legislation in the fields of criminal law and criminal procedural law. It is also responsible for matters related to the position of crime victims and anti-corruption work.

The department deals with tasks related to the performance guidance of the Criminal Sanctions Agency, the prosecution service and the European Institute for Crime Prevention and Control, affiliated with the United Nations. The department also receives and processes petitions for pardon.

There are three units in the Department for Criminal Policy and Criminal Law: Crime Prevention and Sanctions, Criminal Law, and Criminal Procedure.

==== Department for Private Law and Administration of Justice ====
The Department for Private Law and Administration of Justice is responsible for law drafting in the fields of private law, insolvency law, and judicial procedure in civil and petitionary matters.

The department is responsible for the performance guidance of the courts, the National Administrative Office for Enforcement, the public legal aid and guardianship districts, the Office of the Bankruptcy Ombudsman, and the Consumer Disputes Board. In addition, the department is entrusted with certain duties of international judicial assistance. The department deals with matters related to judicial appointments and the Names Board, among other things.

The Department for Private Law and Administration of Justice consists of five units: International Judicial Assistance, Legal Protection Services, Civil Law, Court Affairs, and Private Law and Insolvency.

=== Separate units ===
==== Management Support and Core Services ====
The Management Support and Core Services is responsible for developing the strategic preparation carried out by the Ministry’s senior management and for developing law drafting within the government. The Management Support and Core Services coordinates international affairs, EU affairs and research at the Ministry and communications both at the Ministry and in the administrative branch. Legal revision and internal audit are also responsibilities of the Management Support and Core Services.

The Management Support and Core Services consists of four units: Management Support, Media and Communications, EU and International Affairs, and Legal Revision and Development of Legislation. Furthermore, the Director of Development and Director of Internal Audit are part of the Management Support and Core Services.
