= Magnus Schjerfbeck =

Finnish architect

Svante Magnus Schjerfbeck
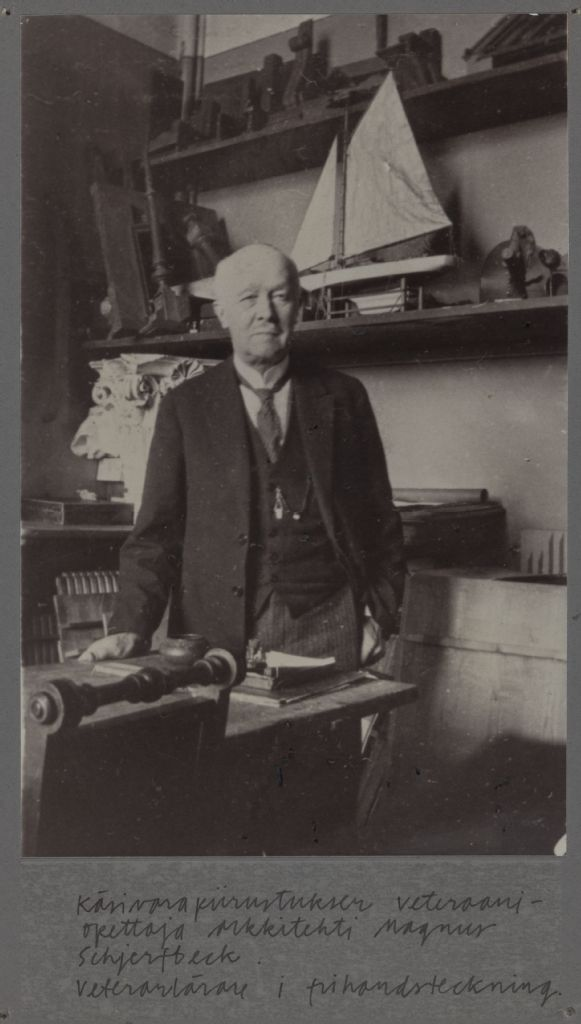
- Schjerfbeck in his study, c. late 1920s
- Born: 24 July 1860; Jakobstad, Grand Duchy of Finland
- Died: 8 May 1933 (aged 72); Helsinki, Finland
- Education: Polytechnical Institute of Finland
- Occupation: Architect
- Spouse: Betty née Bergh
- Practice: Board of Public Building

Magnus Schjerfbeck (24 July 1860 — 8 May 1933) was a Finnish architect and architectural historian.

== Education ==
Schjerfbeck studied at the Polytechnical Institute of Finland (later Helsinki University of Technology, now part of Aalto University, graduating in 1881.

== Career ==
He worked in the Board of Public Building (Yleisten rakennusten ylihallitus; later Rakennushallitus, now Senate Properties) for most of his career, including as their lead architect from 1914 to 1926. In that role, Schjerfbeck made a significant contribution to the design and construction of public buildings of early 20th-century Finland.

=== Works ===
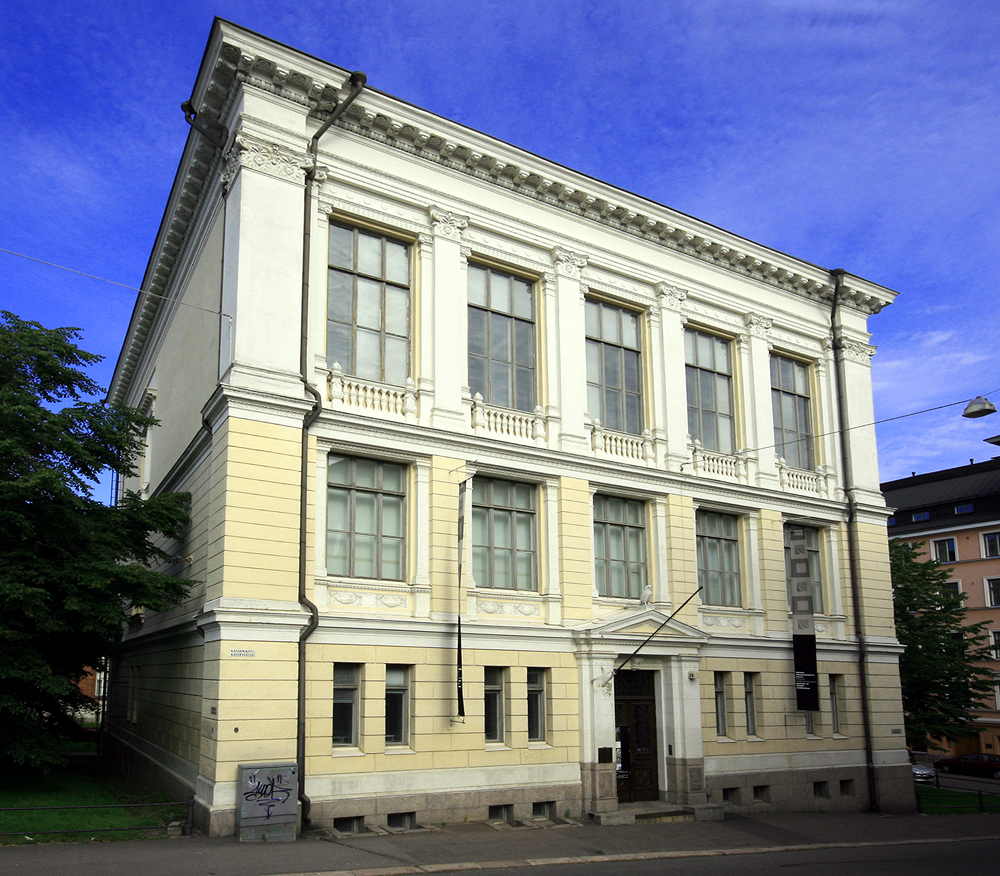
The Museum of Finnish Architecture building designed by Schjerfbeck

His more notable works and projects include:

- The Scientific Societies' Building (Tieteellisten seurain talo) in Helsinki, now housing the Museum of Finnish Architecture
- Hospitals and university clinics in e.g. Helsinki, Oulu, Joensuu, Sortavala, Kajaani, Tampere, Kuopio and Vyborg
- Alexander III's fishing lodge at Langinkoski
- Restoration of Turku Cathedral
- Restoration of the castles at Raseborg, Kastelhom and Käkisalmi

== Artistic family ==
Schjerfbeck taught drawing and composition at the Central School of Industrial Design (Taideteollisuuskeskuskoulu; now part of Aalto University) for many years.

His sister was the painter Helene Schjerfbeck.

His daughter, Johanna Appelberg (1901-1975), was also a painter.
