= Joensuu City Hall =

City hall and cultural center of Joensuu, Finland

- Joensuun kaupungintalo
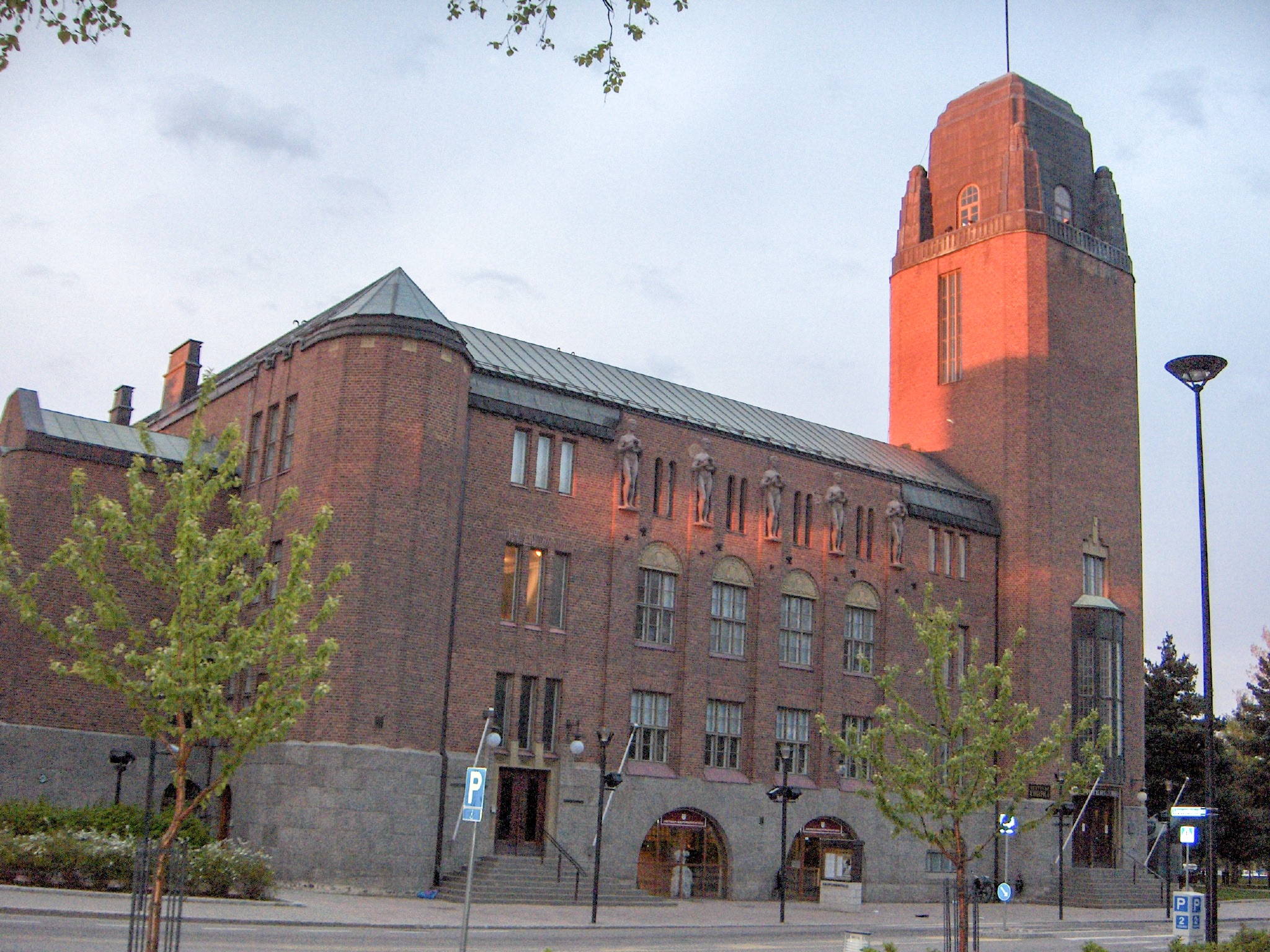
- Joensuu City Hall
- Interactive map of the Joensuu City Hall area

General information
- Type: Administration building
- Architectural style: Romantic Nationalism; Art Nouveau
- Location: Joensuu, Finland, Rantakatu 20
- Coordinates: 62°36′00″N 029°45′55″E
- Completed: November 14, 1914

Design and construction
- Architect: Eliel Saarinen

The Joensuu City Hall (Finnish: Joensuun kaupungintalo) is a brick building in the center of Joensuu, Finland, designed by Eliel Saarinen and completed in 1914, combining styles of Romantic Nationalism and late Art Nouveau. It serves as a center of culture and governance for the city. It houses the city's central administration, the city theater (the easternmost professional theater in the European Union) and a restaurant. The city hall is located on the banks of the Pielinen River on the Rantakatu street. After its completion on November 14, 1914, the new city hall corresponded quite closely to Saarinen's drawings, especially from its facades. The facade statues were designed by sculptor Johannes Haapasalo.

In March 1966, a fire broke out at the city hall, which almost destroyed the building. The fire originated on the stage of the city theater and spread to the attic and tower of the ballroom. The fire was nonetheless contained so that the office part suffered only water damage. The buildings archives were successfully evacuated, but the seats attached to the floor in the theatre remained in place. The building's structures had to be renovated, and the ventilation system was almost completely rebuilt. The surroundings of the city hall were renewed in the 1990s and 2000s. The promenade has been reduced by about a meter and the lowest floor of the house has become more prominent. The city hall was renovated in 1998.

The terrace of the theater restaurant in the city hall is a popular venue for jazz and other club-type concerts. The downstairs theater club regularly hosts smaller live concerts.

== See also ==
- Kuopio City Hall
