= Museum of Finnish Architecture =

Museum in Helsinki, Finland

Coordinates: 60°09′47″N 024°56′51″E

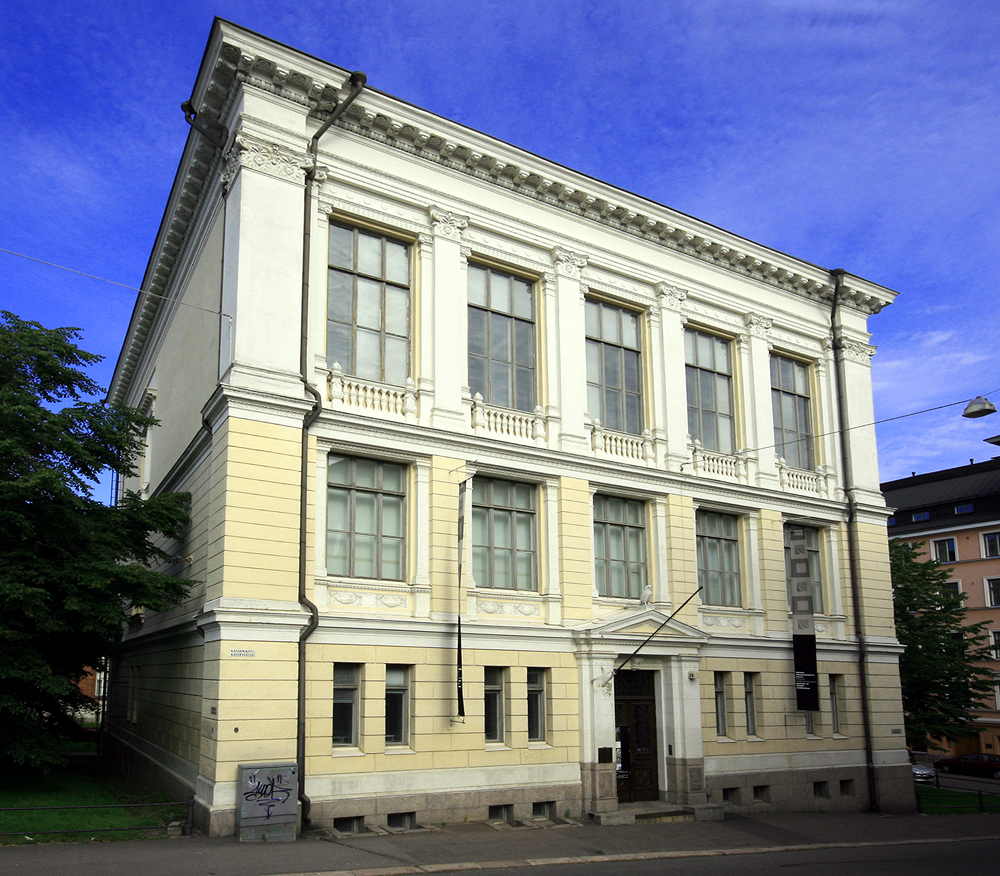
Museum of Finnish Architecture's former building

Wood Studio, an experimental holiday cabin in the museum grounds in 2016

The Museum of Finnish Architecture (Finnish: Suomen arkkitehtuurimuseo, Swedish: Finlands arkitekturmuseum) is an architectural museum in Helsinki, Finland. Established in 1956, it is the second oldest museum of its kind (after the Shchusev Museum of Architecture in Moscow) devoted specifically to architecture. The museum was founded on the basis of the photographic collection of the Finnish Association of Architects (SAFA), which was established in 1949. In 2024, the Museum of Finnish Architecture merged with the Design Museum to form the Architecture & Design Museum.

Until 2024, the museum was on Kasarmikatu street in Ullanlinna, housed in a neo-classical building, designed by architect Magnus Schjerfbeck and completed in 1899. The building was originally in the use of a scientific society and the University of Helsinki. The museum took over use of the building in 1981, before which it had been housed in a former wooden pavilion in Kaivopuisto Park. The Museum of Finnish Architecture located on the same city block as the Design Museum. In 1984 an architectural competition was arranged for a new building to be built in the gap between the two buildings, this linking them together as a single institution. The competition was won by architects Helin and Siitonen, but the project was abandoned soon afterwards, due to logistics and problems of finance. The building is currently owned by the State of Finland through Senate Properties.

The museum has large collections of drawings, photographs, and architectural scale models. It also has its own library and bookstore. The museum organizes exhibitions on both Finnish and foreign architecture, as well as exhibitions on Finnish architecture for touring abroad. It also publishes its own books.

Although independent of SAFA and its journal Finnish Architectural Review (ARK), the museum is seen, along with these, as the key influence in continuously promoting modern architecture in Finland. This policy has been promoted vigorously abroad and sponsored by the Finnish Ministry of Foreign Affairs and Ministry of education.

== See also ==
- Architecture of Finland
