= Kuopio City Hall =

- Kuopion kaupungintalo
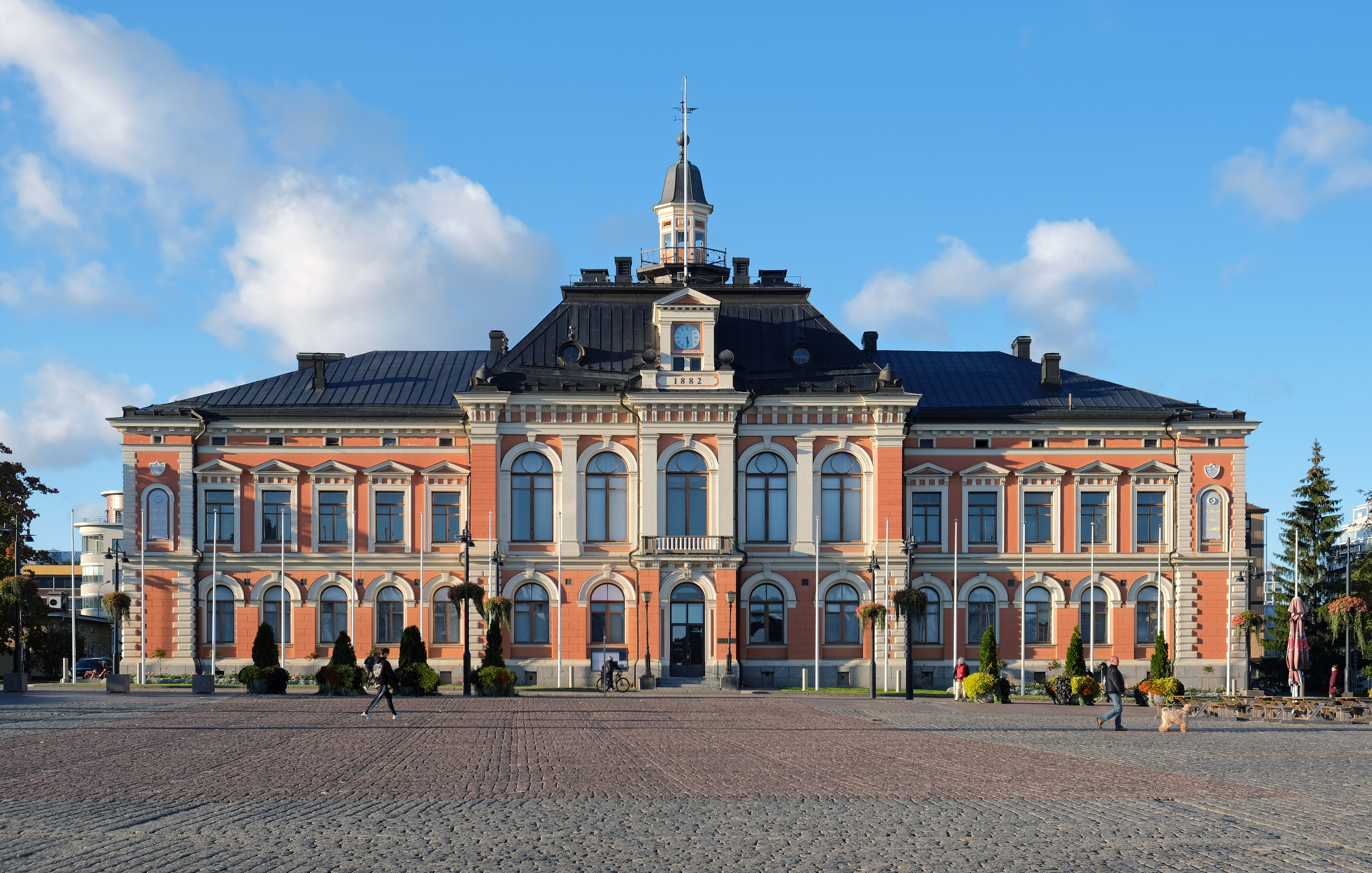
- City Hall in 2020
- Interactive map of the Kuopio City Hall area

General information
- Type: Administration building
- Architectural style: Neo-Renaissance
- Location: Multimäki, Kuopio, Finland, Tulliportinkatu 31
- Coordinates: 62°53′37″N 27°40′41″E
- Construction started: 1882
- Completed: 1886

Design and construction
- Architects: F. A. Sjöström; Josef Stenbäck

Kuopio City Hall is a town hall in center of the Kuopio, Finland, near the Kuopio Market Square. It was designed by Finnish architects F. A. Sjöström and Josef Stenbäck, and was completed in 1886. Stylistically, the city hall is of the Neo-Renaissance of the second half of the 19th century. The current exterior coloring of the house dates back to 1974. In the most beautiful municipal buildings poll, in 2009 Kuopio City Hall was chosen among the three most beautiful municipal buildings. When completed, it sovereignly controlled the northern edge of the market square, the area around the square was still completely wooden at that time. Spatial changes were common in the first decades of the house. The first floor of the house had a restaurant and a public library.

== History ==
The design of the house started as early as 1875, a competition was also held for the design at that time, but it was decided to reject all competition entries. Since then, the estate has been the subject of several unrealized plans. "Kuopio City Hall should not be built on the edge of a market square in a remote place far from the center. The city will never grow so big," it was stated and believed in 1880 in Kuopio, however, the building was still erected there. A wooden house was burned from the road of the town hall on the way to the town hall by a driver named Inkinen. The rest of the buildings in Inkinen's courtyard were demolished.

The interiors have undergone many changes over the years. Already in the 20th century, ceiling and wall paintings were covered with gray monochrome paint, and these overpaintings have been made a total of 3-4 times. In 1917 and 1921, drawings were made to expand the town hall, and in 1951 Alvar Aalto designed a concert and theater building behind the town hall; however, none one of these plans materialized.

The actual restoration was done in a 1970s renovation in the lower lobby, staircase, upper lobby, ballroom and former City Council Chamber, which was converted into a canteen for employment. In these premises, mainly wall and ceiling surfaces were restored, the floors were renewed taking into account the restoration aspects. Also original equipment, e.g. the lamps were restored.

The last internal renovation was carried out in 1976 - 1979. At that time, e.g. air conditioning, new room arrangements and the restoration of interior paintings.

At the western end of the town hall there is the text "The right to guide the people" and at the eastern end "The law guards the law". The words are from A. Oksanen's poem Revealed in Porthan's Statue (Porthanin kuvapatsaan paljastettua). The texts were not received on the wall of the town hall until 1900, when a clock that had not been acquired before was also acquired.

== Government and service ==
Kuopio City Hall currently employs more than 50 people. The workspaces of the mayor, service area managers and management secretaries are on the second floor of City Hall, as is the staff canteen. The city government also meets on the second floor. On the first floor are the city office, the staff and well-being development service, as well as marketing, communication and customer service. The basement is used for storage and archives, and there is a conference room with auxiliary facilities built in the attic in the 1980s.

== See also ==
- Joensuu City Hall
- Kuopio Market Hall
- Mikkeli City Hall
- State Provincial Office of Kuopio
