= Mikkeli Town Hall =

- Mikkelin kaupungintalo
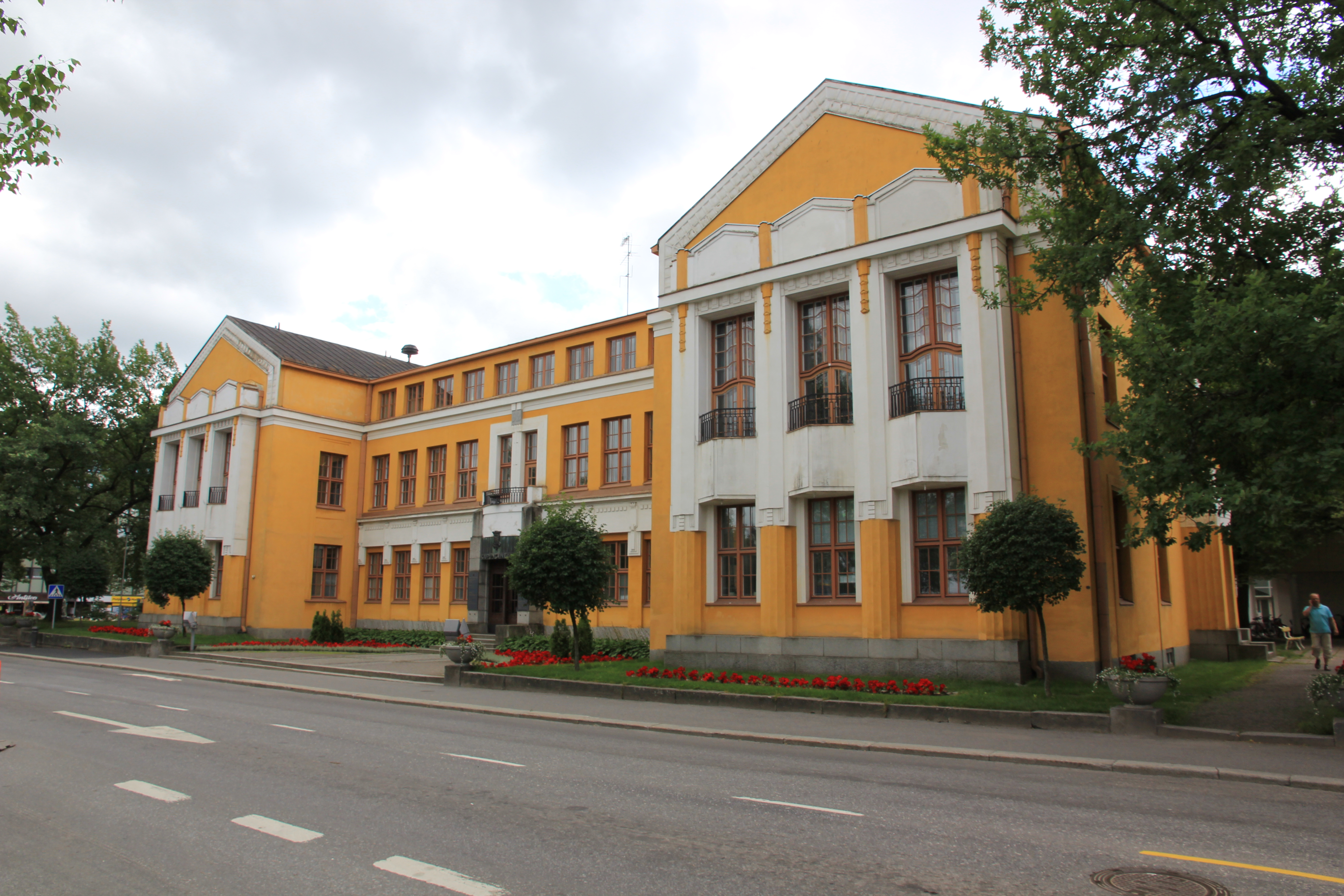
- Town hall in 2011
- Interactive map of the Mikkeli Town Hall area

General information
- Type: Administration building
- Architectural style: Art Nouveau
- Location: Savilahti, Mikkeli, Finland, Raatihuoneenkatu 8–10
- Coordinates: 61°41′13.23″N 27°16′20.68″E
- Completed: 1912; 114 years ago

Design and construction
- Architect: Selim A. Lindqvist

Mikkeli Town Hall is a town hall in center of the Mikkeli, Finland, near the Mikkeli Market Square. It was designed by Finnish architect Selim A. Lindqvist, and was completed in 1912. The architecture of the building has been characterized as late-Art Nouveau.

== History ==
The plot on the southern side of the market square was reserved for the town hall when the city was founded. Mikkeli was first considered for a town hall in the 1840s and again in the 1880s, but these projects did not materialize. In 1907, plans were commissioned from Selim A. Lindqvist. The drawings are dated July 1911, at the same time as the Naisvuori Water Tower that Lindqvist designed for Mikkeli. The foundation stone of the town hall was laid in August 1911 and it was completed the following year. Lindqvist designed both the fixed and movable interior of the house. In addition to the City Council of Mikkeli, the building originally housed, among other things, the local magistrate's office, the court of appeals, the chamber of financial transactions, the customs chamber, the building office, the library with its reading room, and the vaccination room of the Health Board.

During the 1918 Finnish Civil War, the town hall housed the headquarters of the White Savo Front. The building was damaged in the bombing of the Winter War in 1940, and during post-war renovations, a third floor was added in 1947. A similar addition was made to the courtyard wing in 1977. The town hall was expanded behind it with the city office building, completed in 1986, designed by Hannele Storgårds based on a competition win.

An elevator was built in the town hall during 2019–2020, with a total cost of €400,000.

== See also ==
- Kuopio City Hall
