= Kuopio Governor Palace =

Administrative building in Kuopio, Finland

Coordinates: 62°53′16″N 027°41′20″E

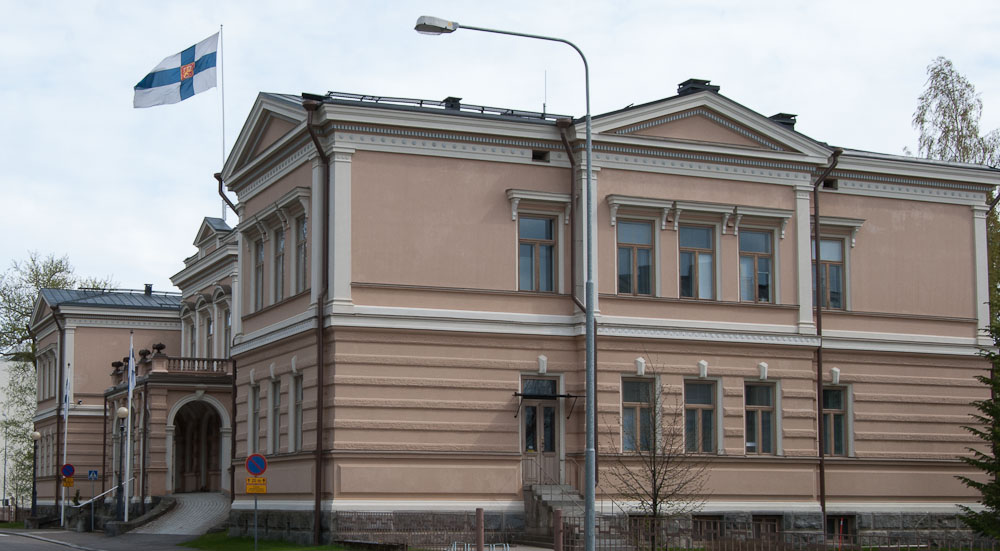
Pictured in 2012

The Kuopio Governor Palace or State Provincial Office of Kuopio (Finnish: Kuopion lääninhallitusrakennus) is a former government building in Kuopio, Finland, located in the Väinölänniemi district on the Hallituskatu street in the immediate vicinity of Kuopionlahti and Väinölänniemi parks. It was designed by architect Konstantin Kiseleff, who completed the building plan in 1882. The staff of the Administrative Board of the Kuopio Province moved into the building in 1885. It represents the architectural style of the Neo-Renaissance. The building is fully protected from both the outside and inside. The building is owned by the state-owned company Senate Properties and houses the office of the Regional State Administrative Agency for Eastern Finland.

The province government was reserved for its current place on the edge of the Piispanpuisto park in the 1860 town plan. The first drawings of the house were made by the architect E. B. Lohrmann in 1865. However, these, like many other later plans, did not materialize.

The pomp of the building reflects the position the governor had at the time the building was completed. In addition to the haughty main building, the complex includes single-storey buildings built on the sides, which were raised and continued later. The complex also included a large garden with gazebos that extended to the shores of the Kuopionlahti.

== See also ==
- Kuopio City Hall
