= Selim A. Lindqvist =

Finnish architect (1867–1939)

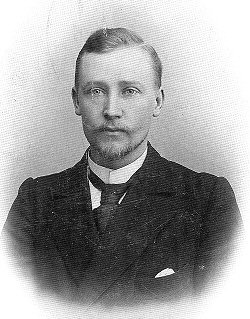
Selim A. Lindqvist

Selim Arvid Lindqvist (19 May 1867, Helsinki – 17 May 1939, Helsinki) was an architect from Finland. He worked mainly in the Art Nouveau style and mainly in Helsinki. He has been described as one of the foremost Finnish architects from the time around 1900.

== Life ==
Lindqvist came from a lower-middle-class family; his father was a Feldwebel in the military and his mother ran a bakery. He studied architecture at the Polytechnical Institute (today Aalto University) under Gustaf Nyström and Frans Anatolius Sjöström between 1884 and 1888. During his time studying, he started to work with the architect Constantin Kiseleff. Lindqvist's breakthrough as an architect came in 1890, when a large department store in central Helsinki was built to his designs (Merkurius department store). Around this time he formed a partnership with architect Elia Heikel, who had taken over Kiseleff's firm. He was also tied to the architect firm Grahn, Hedman & Wasastjerna for some time. He also worked closely with Friedrich Lüsch, who had immigrated to Finland from Germany.

In the 1890s, when building activity in Helsinki dropped due to an economic downturn, Lindqvist journeyed to Italy, Austria, Hungary and Germany, lived for a year in Nizhny Novgorod and worked for some time in Berlin. He returned to Finland and worked in Hanko between 1896 and 1898. Thereafter he returned to Helsinki. He subsequently contributed many buildings in Helsinki, not least department stores and other commercial properties. He also had several commissions from Helsinki Municipality. In addition, he designed industrial buildings and had some commissions from outside Helsinki, e.g. the town hall of Mikkeli.

Lindqvist married Swedish-born singer Emmy Keen in 1901. The couple had four children and from 1908 they lived in Pitäjänmäki.

== Architecture ==
Lindqvist has been described as an accomplished and meticulous architect, and as one of the foremost Finnish architects from around 1900. Contemporaries described his work as "elegant, stylish and functional". He often worked in a pronounced Art Nouveau style, but not exclusively. In his early career he followed Neo-Renaissance ideals, and towards the end of his life he turned to a more Neoclassical style, and also experimented with Functionalist forms. His customers were reputedly often satisfied with his work but he lacked a distinct personal style. In this regard he is not comparable with e.g. Lars Sonck or Eliel Saarinen. Stylistically he had a broad repertoire and was open to international influences. Influences from contemporary German architecture are particularly apparent in many of his buildings, but Austrian and English or American influences are also discernible in his oeuvre.

As an example of the commercial buildings Lindqvist designed in central Helsinki, a department building built for J. F. Lundqvist in 1901 can be mentioned. In style it is a rather loose form of Neo-Gothic popular at the time. The building was also praised in contemporary architectural magazines. The former office building for the city electricity company (1909) can be mentioned as an example of the many official commissions Lindqvist received. The aforementioned city hall in Mikkeli draws on influences from both Austrian and Scottish Art Nouveau but strives at the same time to blend in with the surrounding Neoclassical architecture. Lastly, Villa Johanna in Helsinki has been described as the most accomplished private house designed by Lindqvist. Both Villa Johanna and the near-contemporary Villa Ensi (today a hospital) draw heavily on continental Art Nouveau ideas.

== Gallery ==
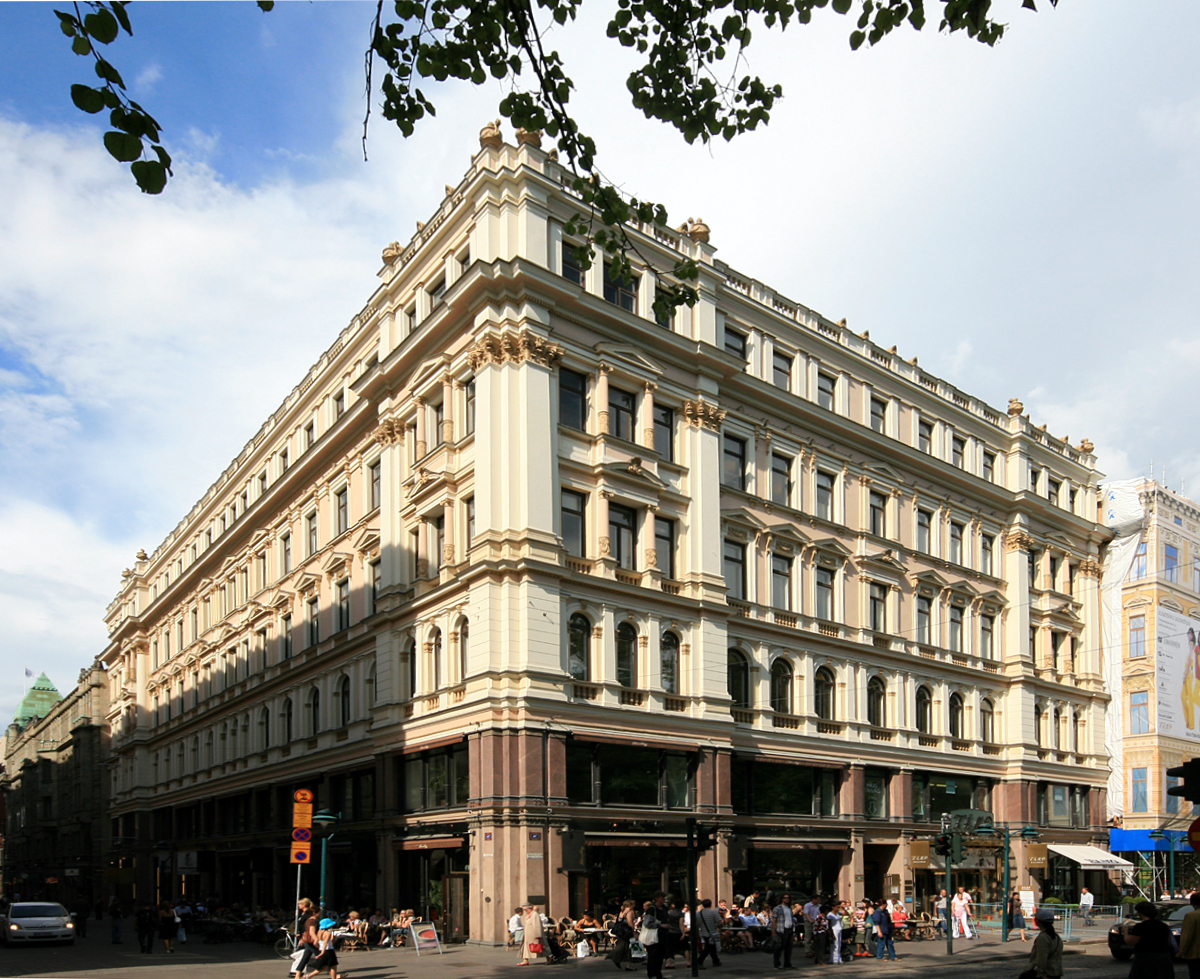
Merkurius department store (1890)

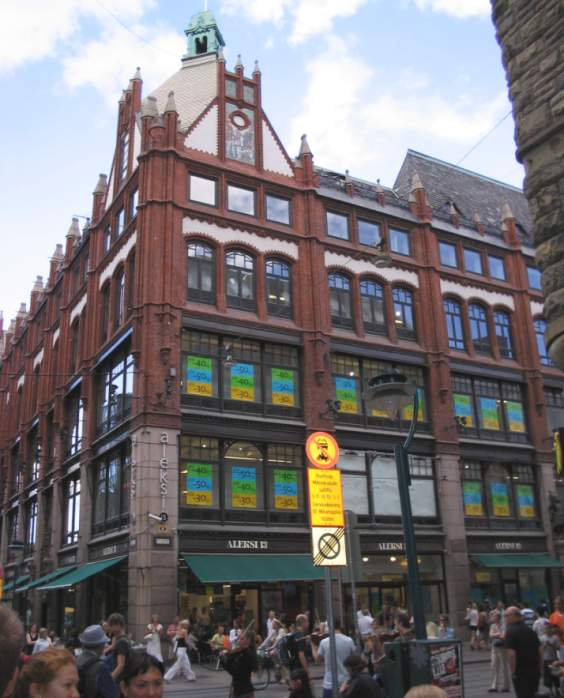
Department store built for J. F. Lundqvist (1901)

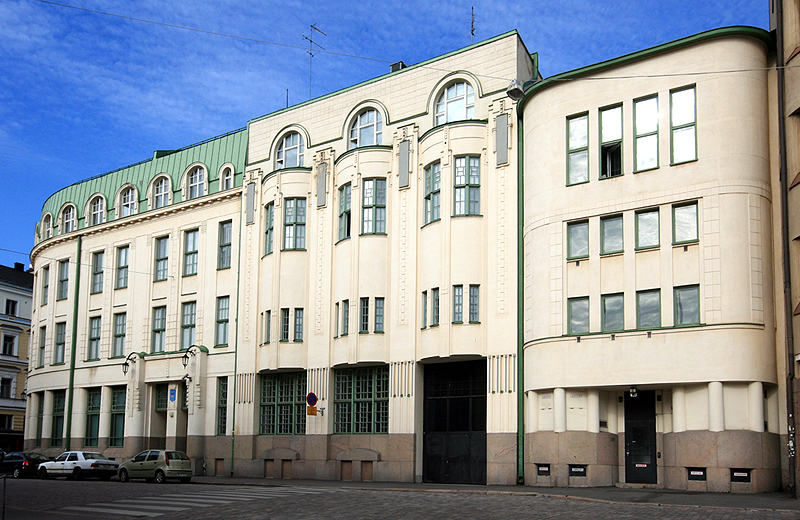
Former office building for the city electricity company (1909)

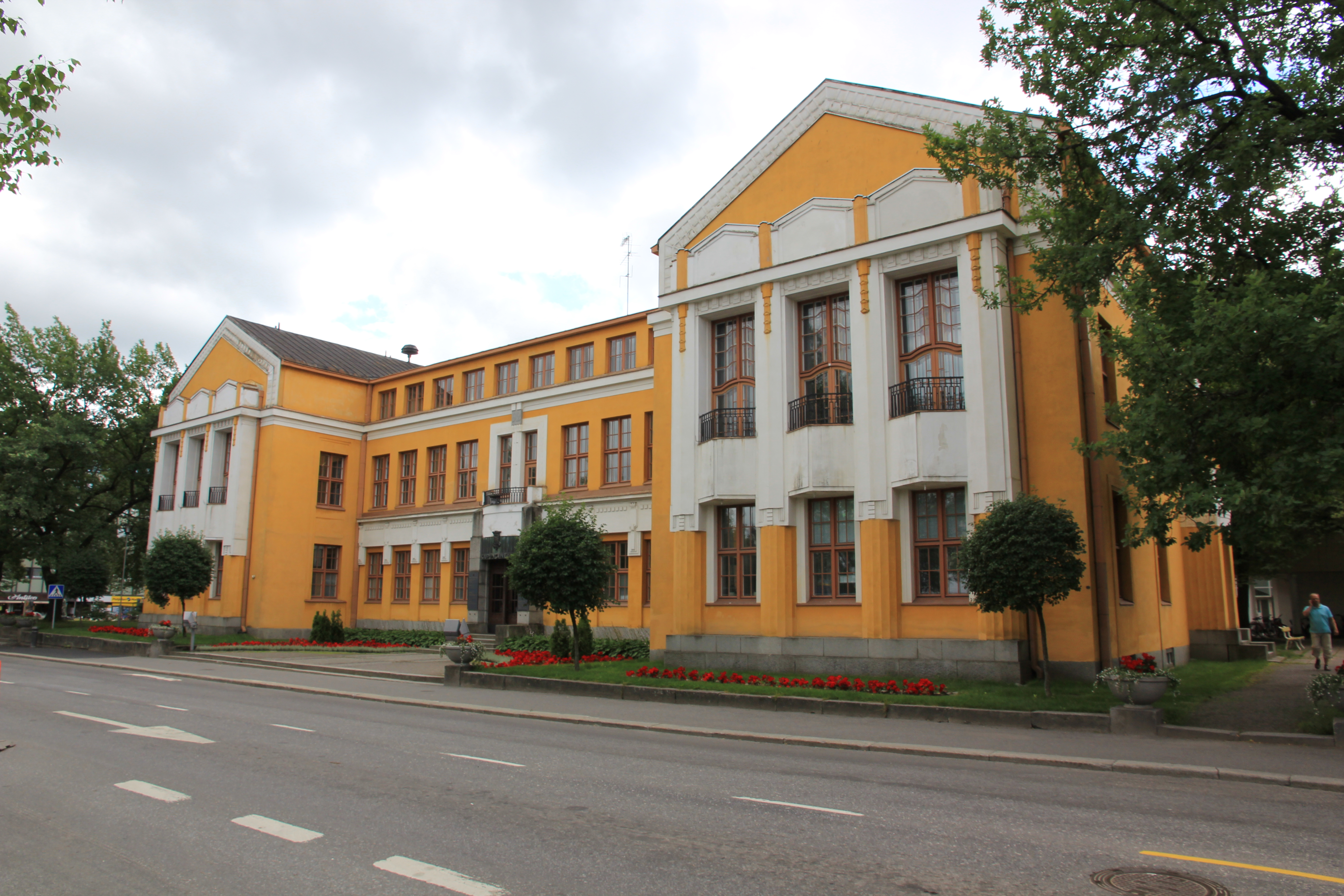
Mikkeli town hall (1910-12)

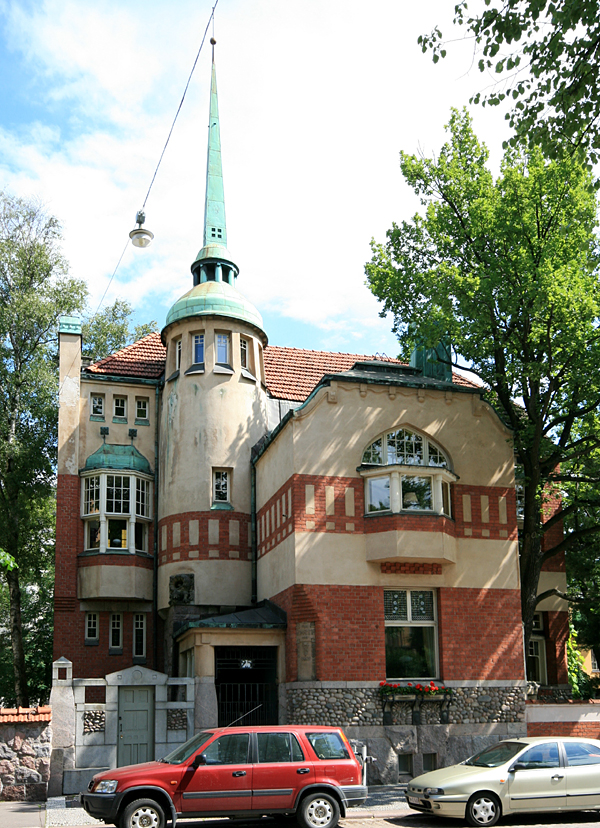
Villa Johanna (1906)

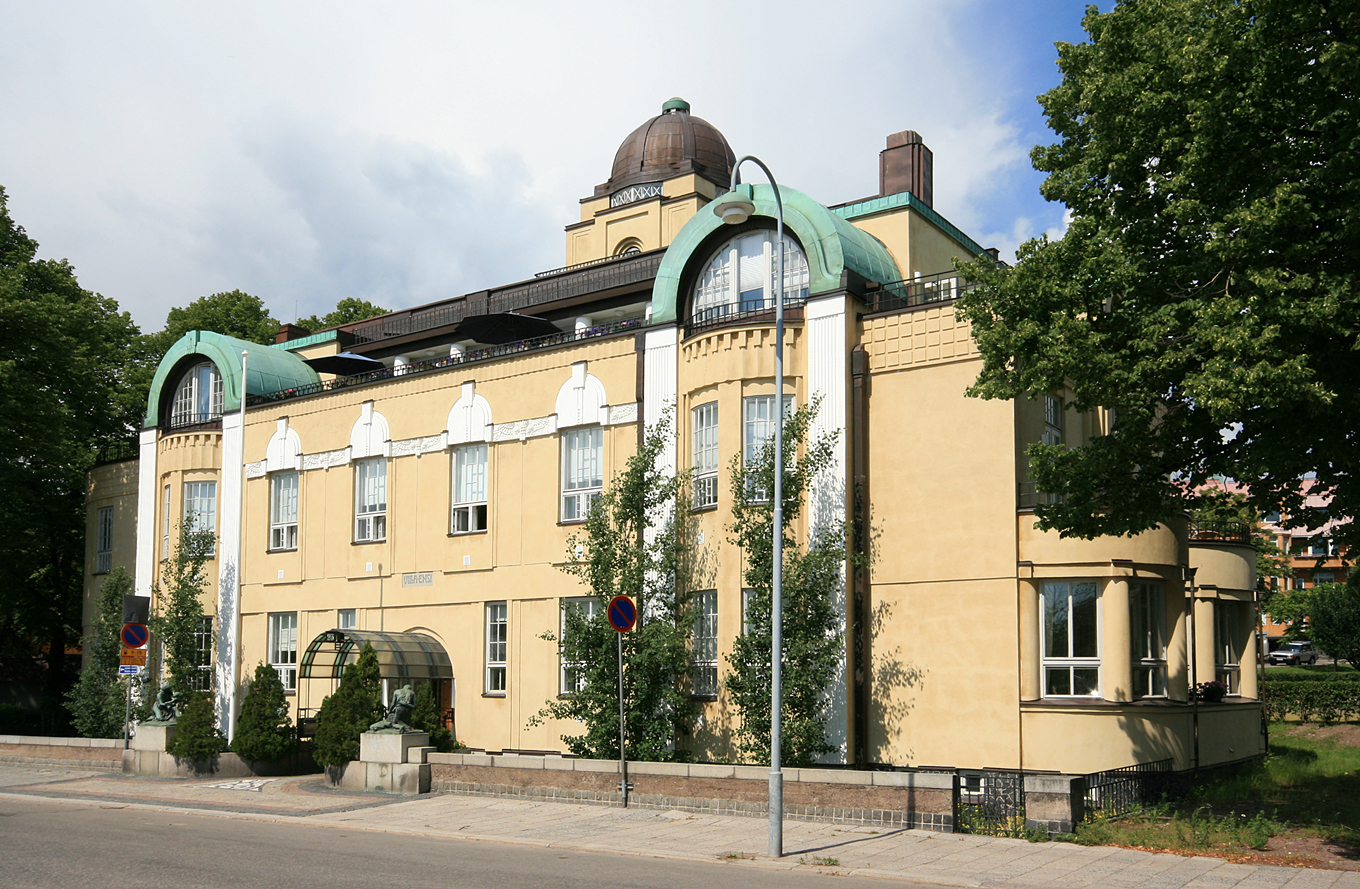
Villa Ensi (1910-12)
