= Senate Properties =

Finnish real estate company

Senate Properties Finnish: Senaatti-kiinteistöt Swedish: Senatfastigheter
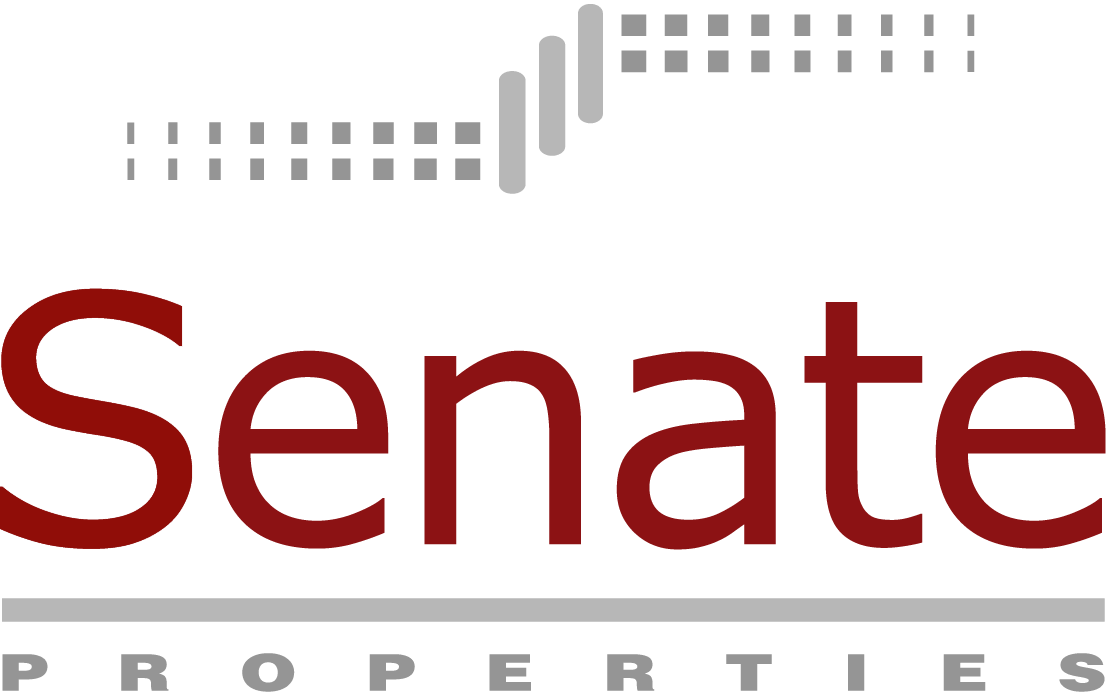
- Company type: Liikelaitos (≈ unincorporated state-owned enterprise)
- Industry: Real estate
- Predecessor: State Real Property Agency (1995 to 1999); National Board of Public Building (until 1995)
- Founded: 1999; 27 years ago in Helsinki, Finland
- Founder: Government of Finland
- Headquarters: Helsinki, Finland
- Area served: Republic of Finland
- Key people: Aulis Kohvakka (Managing Director)
- Revenue: 677 million EUR (2008) ▼5% from 2007
- Operating income: 220 million EUR (2008) ▼6% from 2007
- Net income: 105 million EUR (2008) ▼14% from 2007
- Total assets: 5,857 million EUR (2008) ▲3% from 2007
- Total equity: 3,404 million EUR (2008) steady from 2007
- Owner: Republic of Finland (100%)
- Number of employees: 277 (2008)
- Website: www.senaatti.fi/en/

Senate Properties (in Finnish: Senaatti-kiinteistöt, in Swedish: Senatfastigheter) is a Finnish unincorporated state-owned enterprise, which manages a major part of the real estate assets owned by the Republic of Finland.

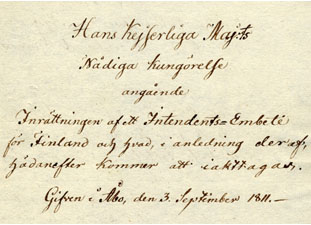
Declaration made 3 September 1811 by Tsar Alexander I of Russia to establish the Office of the Intendant. Handwriting in Swedish.

== History ==
Senate Properties descends from the Office of the Intendant (corresponding names in Finnish and Swedish are listed in the table below), established 3 September 1811, the goal of which was to supervise the planning of government buildings. In 1865, the name was changed to the Board of Public Buildings; and in 1936 to the National Board of Public Building. In 1995, the National Board of Public Building — which was a government agency managing state property — was dissolved. Facility management operations were incorporated into Engel kiinteistöpalveluyhtymä Oy, which was fully privatized in 2004, the buyer being ISS A/S. The majority of the state property assets were transferred into the newly formed State Real Property Agency. The purpose of this agency was to manage the state property which was deemed to be in permanent use.

On 1 January 1999, a heterogeneous collection of government real estate worth 1.3 billion EUR was transferred from various government-owned companies and government agencies — including the State Real Property Agency — and incorporated into Kapiteeli Oy. The transfer consisted of buildings deemed redundant from the government perspective. This included former school buildings, empty government buildings, railway stations fallen into disuse, and other buildings that were considered unnecessary for the government to own, such as post offices and hotels. Part of this property was developed and sold on the market between 1999 and 2006. Kapiteeli was privatized in September 2006. The single buyer, Sponda Oyj, paid 950 million EUR for 100% of Kapiteeli's stock.

Also on 1 January 1999, the State Real Property Agency was transformed from being a government agency into being an unincorporated state-owned enterprise. During the same year, several culturally significant properties were transferred to the State Real Property Agency, including the Ateneum, Kiasma, and the Finnish National Opera Building.

On 1 March 2001, the name of the State Real Property Agency was changed to Senate Properties. The name-change required a change in law because the State Real Property Agency was a state enterprise under Finnish public law, and such entities could not change their name via registration as in the private sector. The purpose with the name-change was to improve the corporate image by having a name reflecting both traditions and modern business philosophy. The new name also refers to the Helsinki Senate Square, where several nearby buildings are managed by Senate Properties.

Organizational lineage of Senate Properties
Year	English	Finnish	Swedish
1811–1865	Office of the Intendant	Intendentinkonttori	Intendentkontoret
1865–1936	Board of Public Building	Yleisten rakennusten ylihallitus	Överstyrelsen för allmänna byggnader
1936–1995	National Board of Public Building	Rakennushallitus	Byggnadsstyrelsen
1995–2001	State Real Property Agency	Valtion kiinteistölaitos	Statens fastighetsverk^{(note)}
2001→	Senate Properties	Senaatti-kiinteistöt	Senatfastigheter
Note: There is also a government agency in Sweden called Statens fastighetsverk, which handles functions similar to its Finnish counterpart.

== Legal status ==
Senate Properties is an unincorporated, fully state-owned enterprise (Finnish: Liikelaitos). It is unincorporated in the sense that Senate Properties is not a legal person separate from the State, and compared to incorporated companies, the organization has limited jurisdiction over its activities. Finnish government organizations of this type are governed by the Unincorporated State Enterprise Act of 2002 (Laki Valtion Liikelaitoksista (in Finnish)).

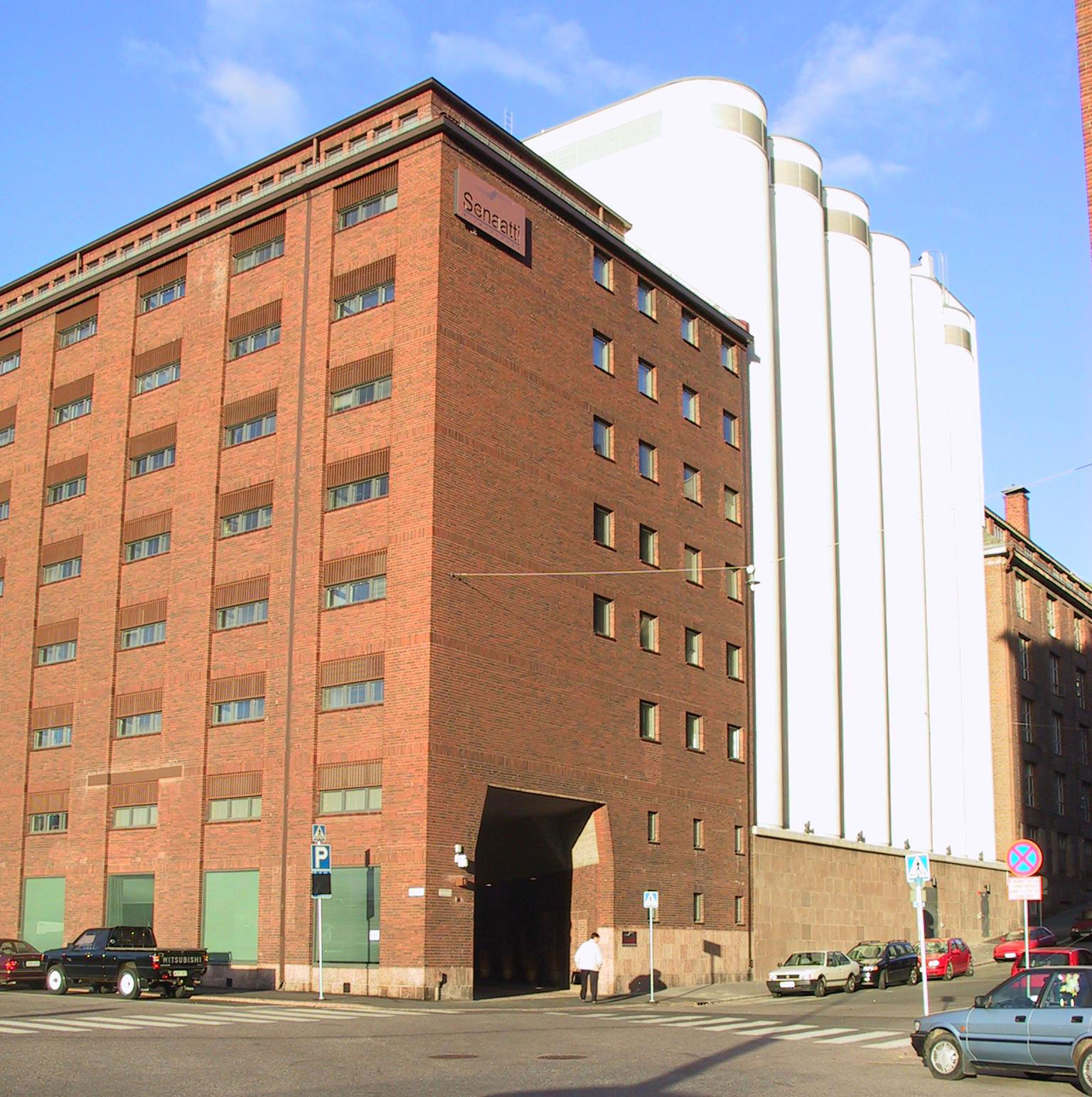
The headquarters of Senate Properties in Sörnäinen, Helsinki.

== Finance ==
At the end of 2008, the Finnish government held assets totaling 51.5 billion EUR. Of these assets, 3.8 billion were held in Senate Properties; consisting of 2.6 billion EUR as equity capital, and 1.2 billion as long-term loans. In addition to the equity capital and loans by the Finnish government, Senate Properties had 0.8 billion in retained earnings, and external financing amounting to 1.2 billion from financial institutions. Its balance sheet totaled 5.9 billion at the end of 2008.

== Development projects ==
- Large state office building in Hakaniemi.
- Töölönlahti land areas.

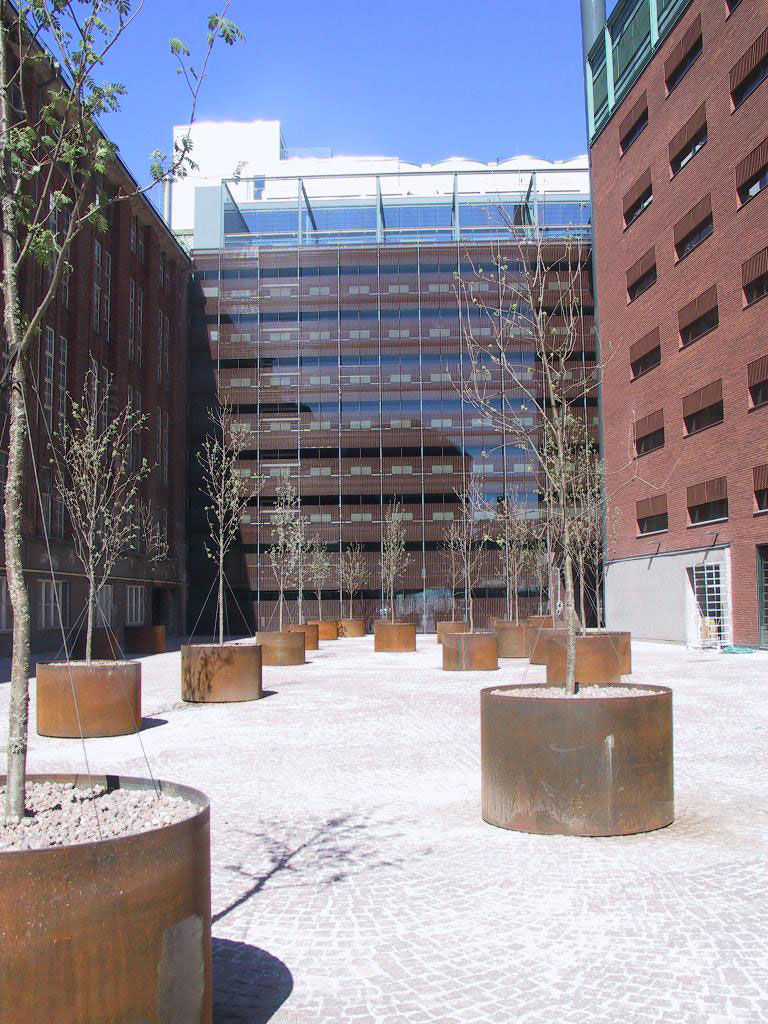
The headquarters of Senate Properties in Sörnäinen, Helsinki, as seen from the inner yard.

== General information ==
In 2007, Senate Properties was — out of 29 large Finnish companies — recognized as Finland's top reporter of issues related to the environment and to corporate social responsibility.

== Gallery of buildings ==
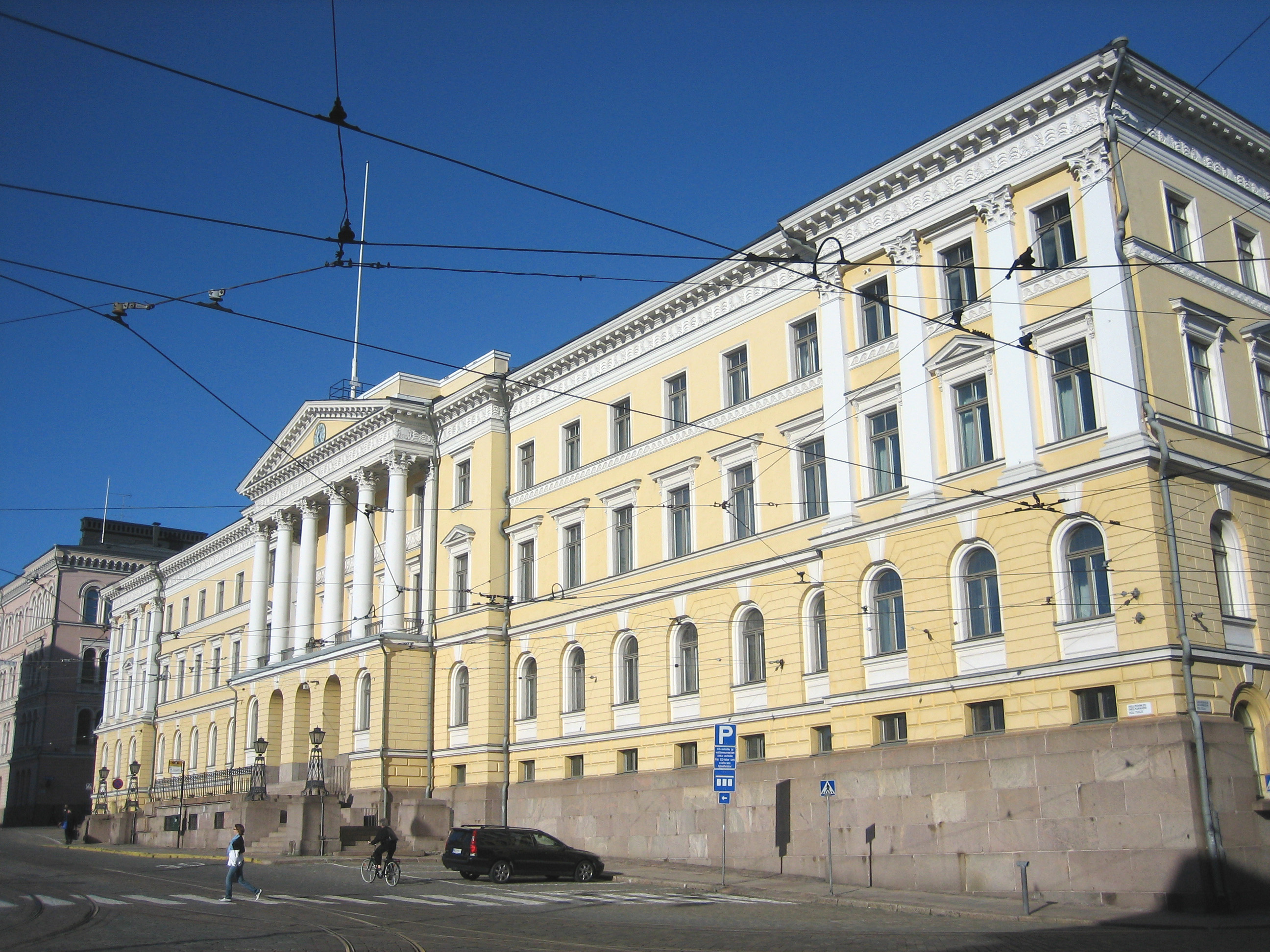
The Government Palace near the Senate Square.

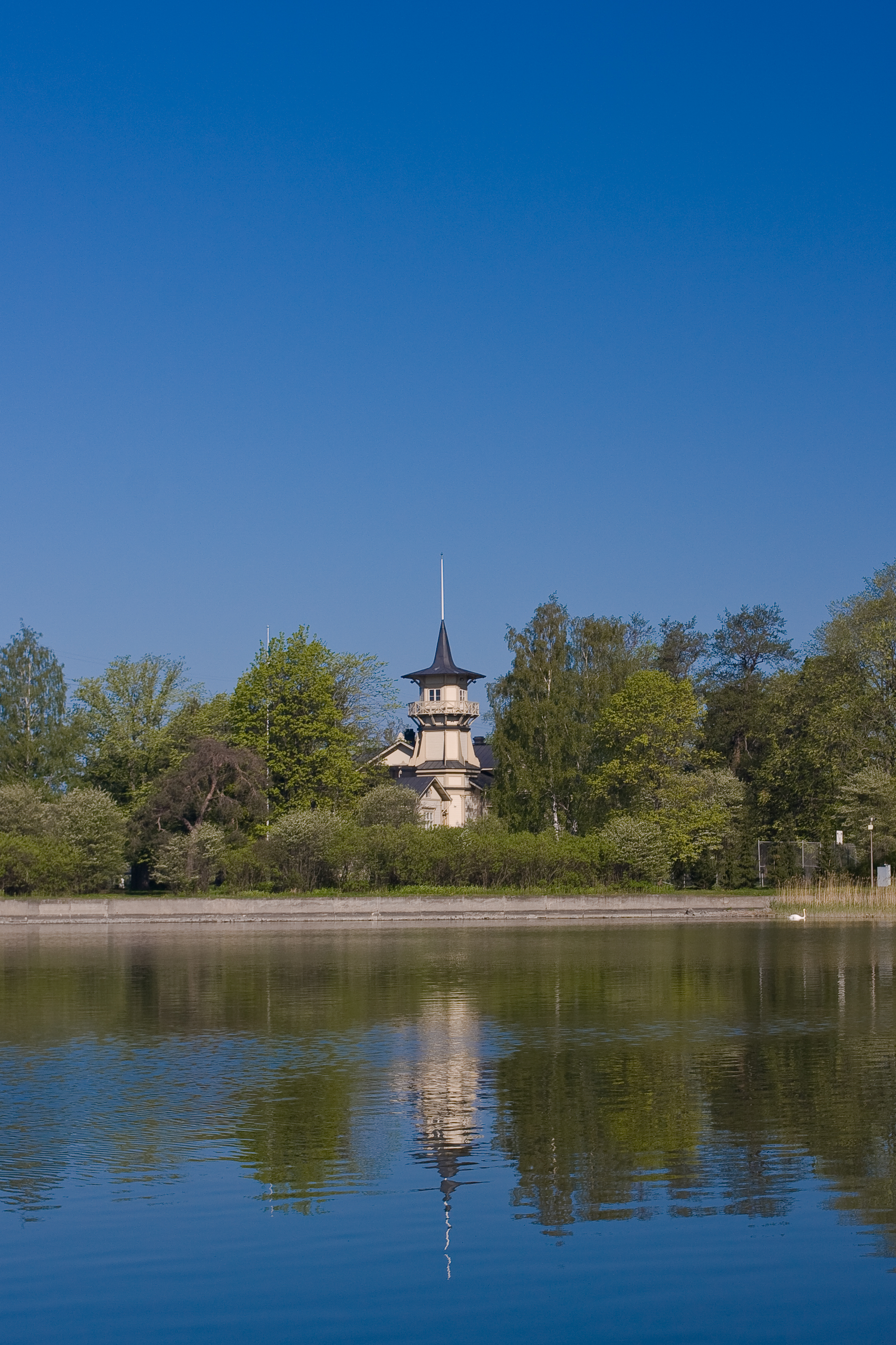
Kesäranta, the official residence of the Prime Minister of Finland, in Meilahti.

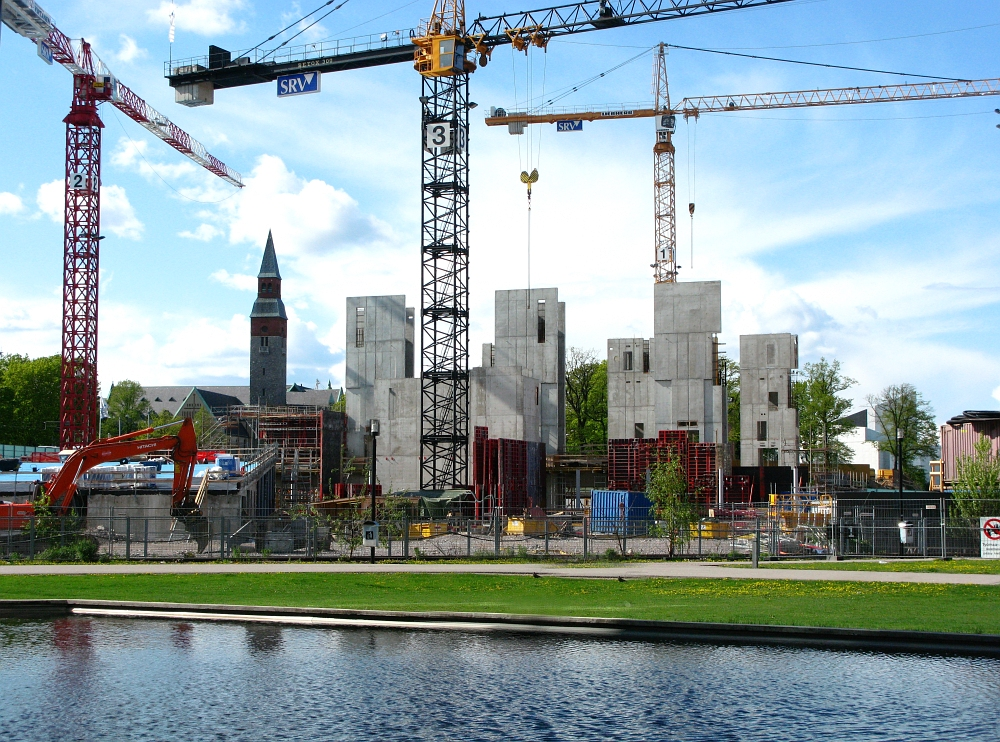
Construction of the Helsinki Music Center.

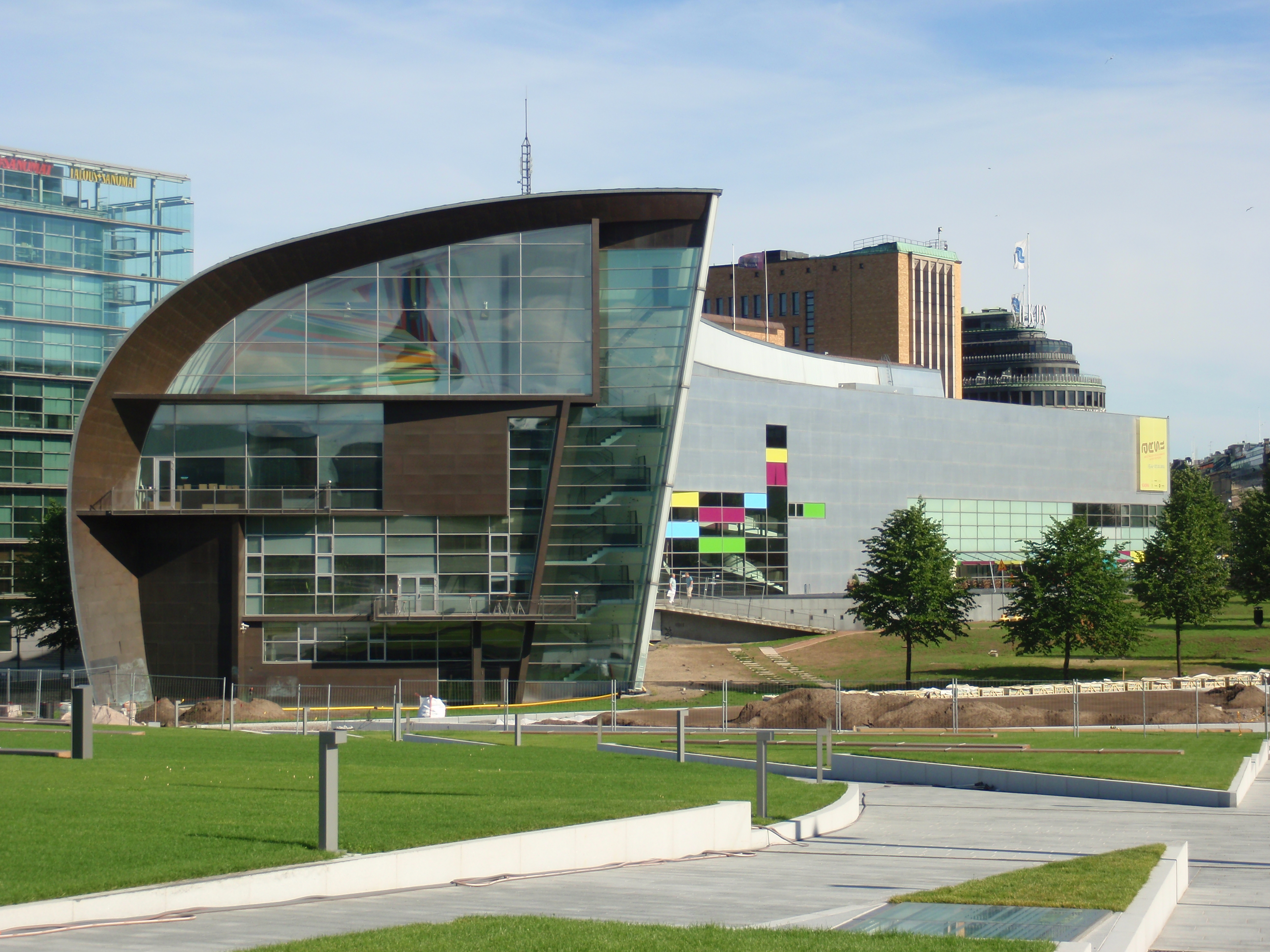
The contemporary art museum Kiasma on Mannerheimintie.

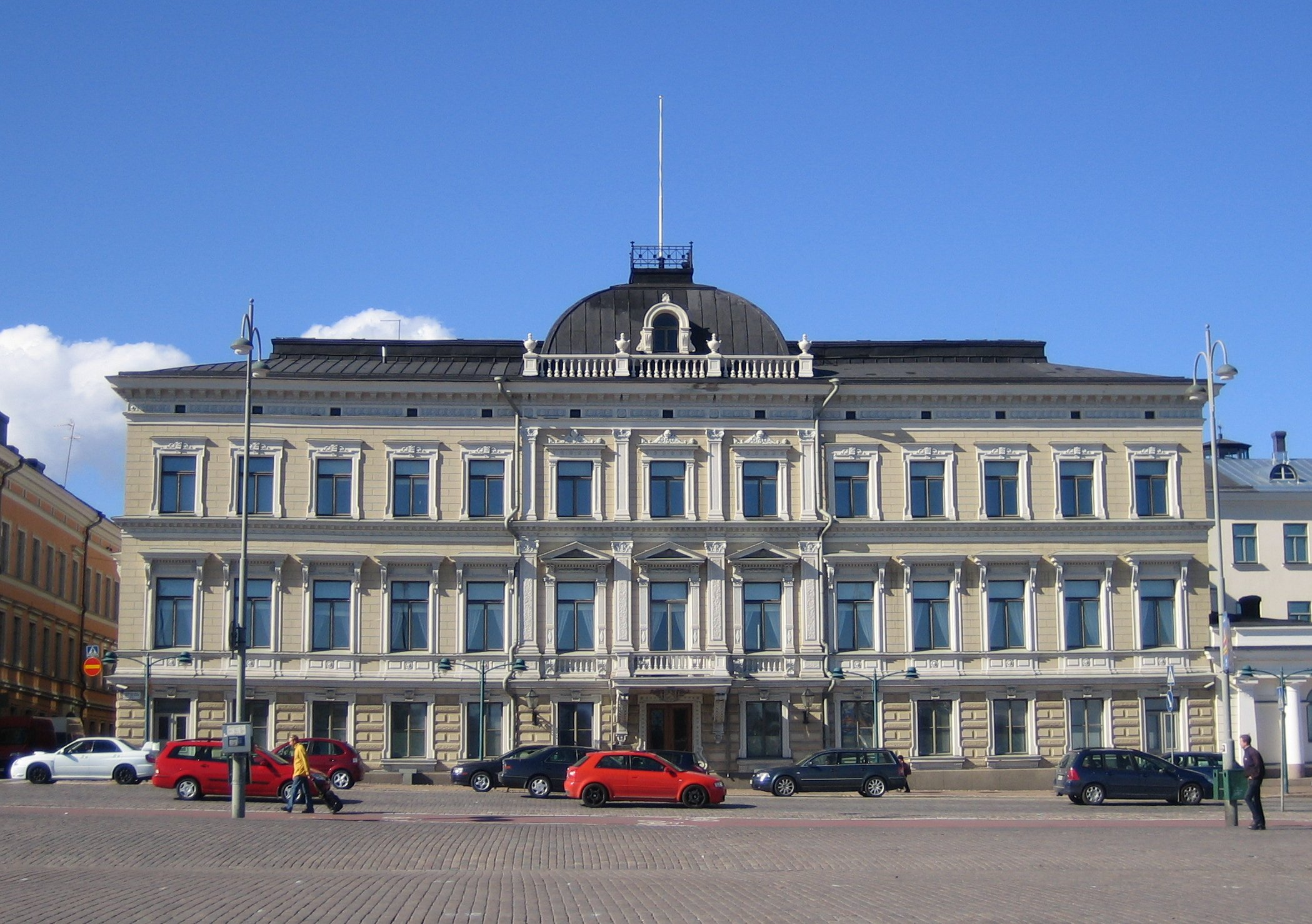
The Supreme Court of Finland on Pohjoisesplanadi.

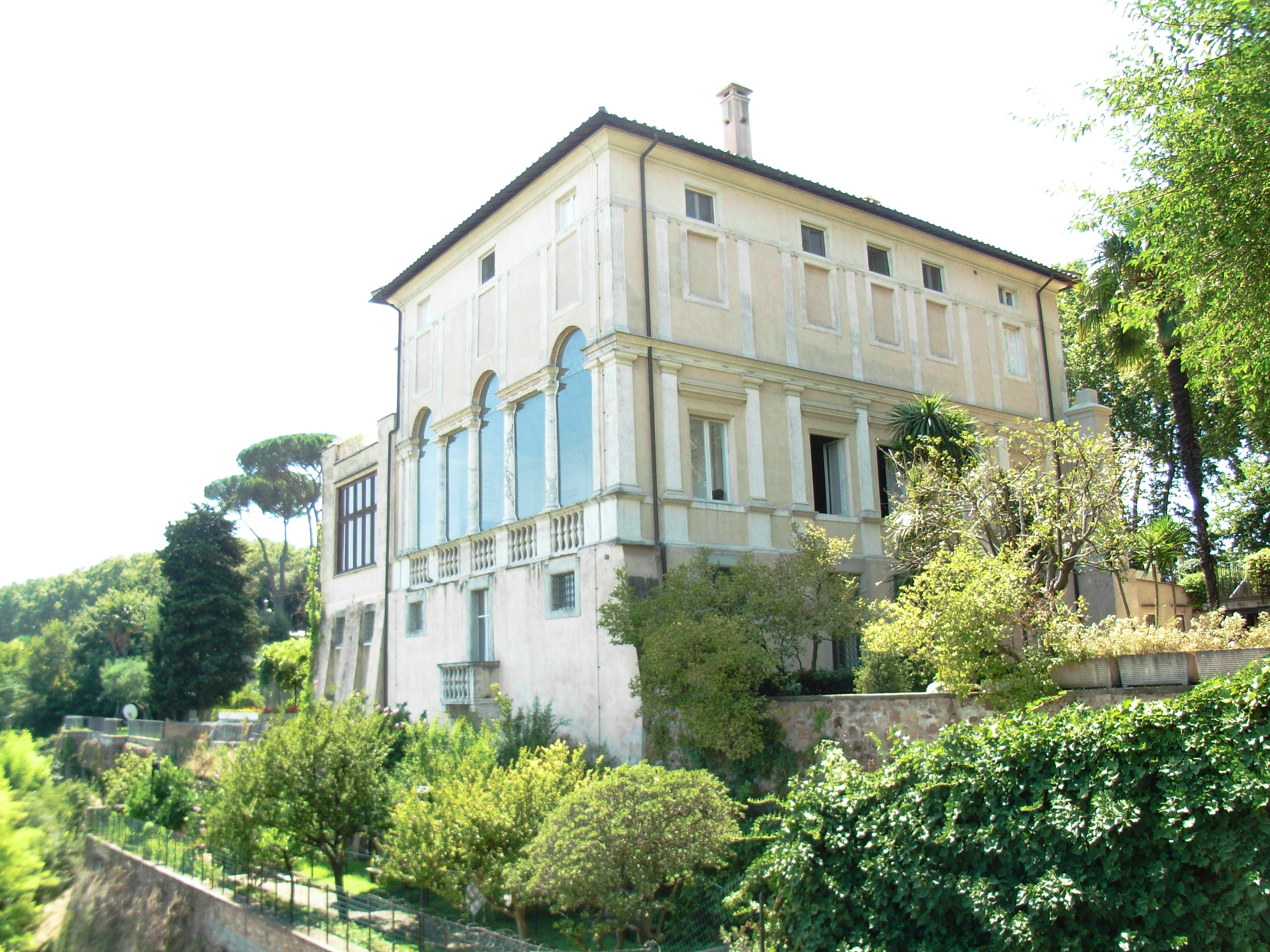
The Villa Lante al Gianicolo in Rome, Italy.

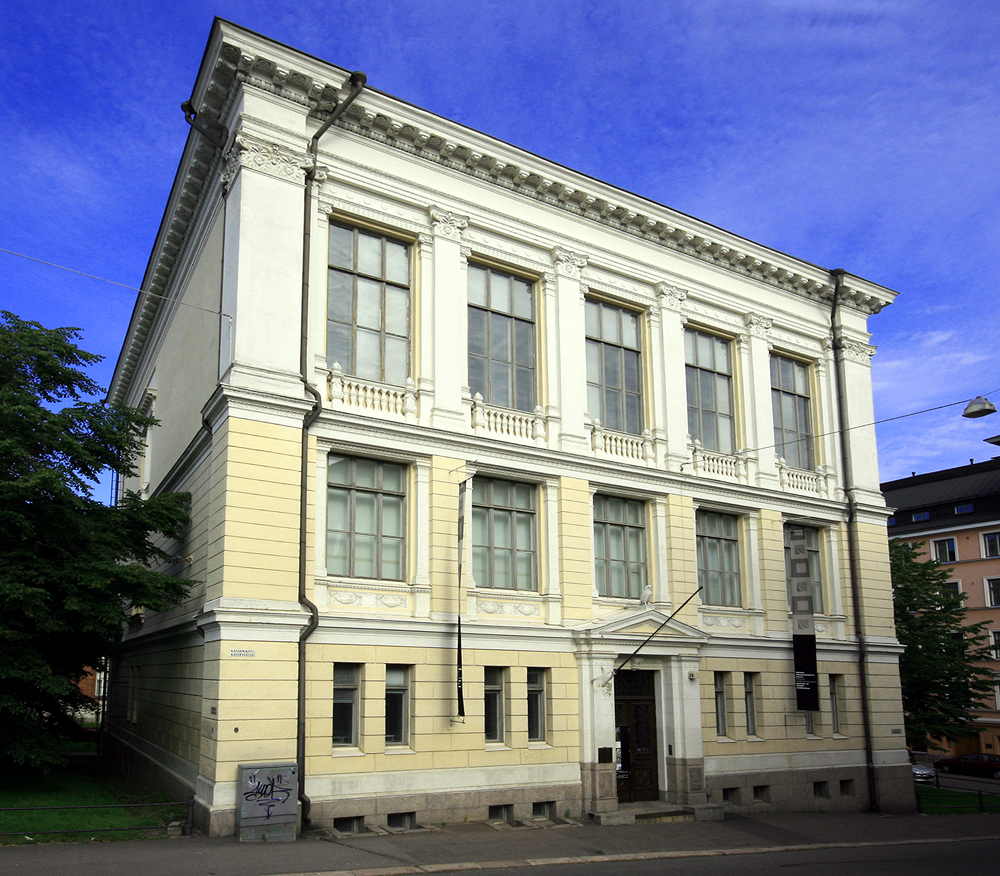
The Museum of Finnish Architecture.

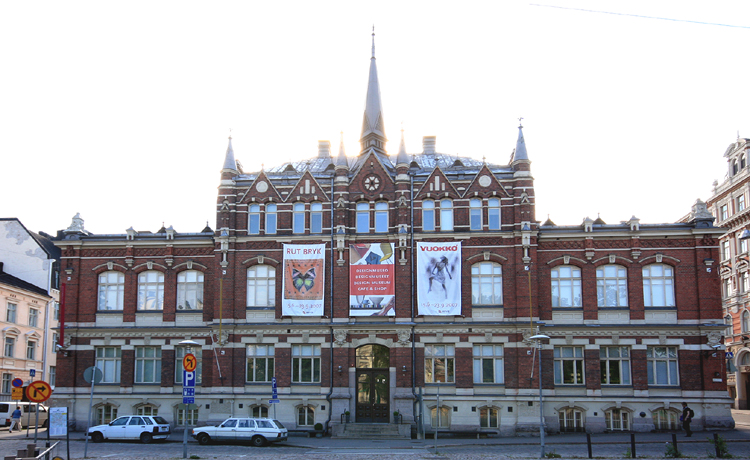
The Design Museum, Helsinki.

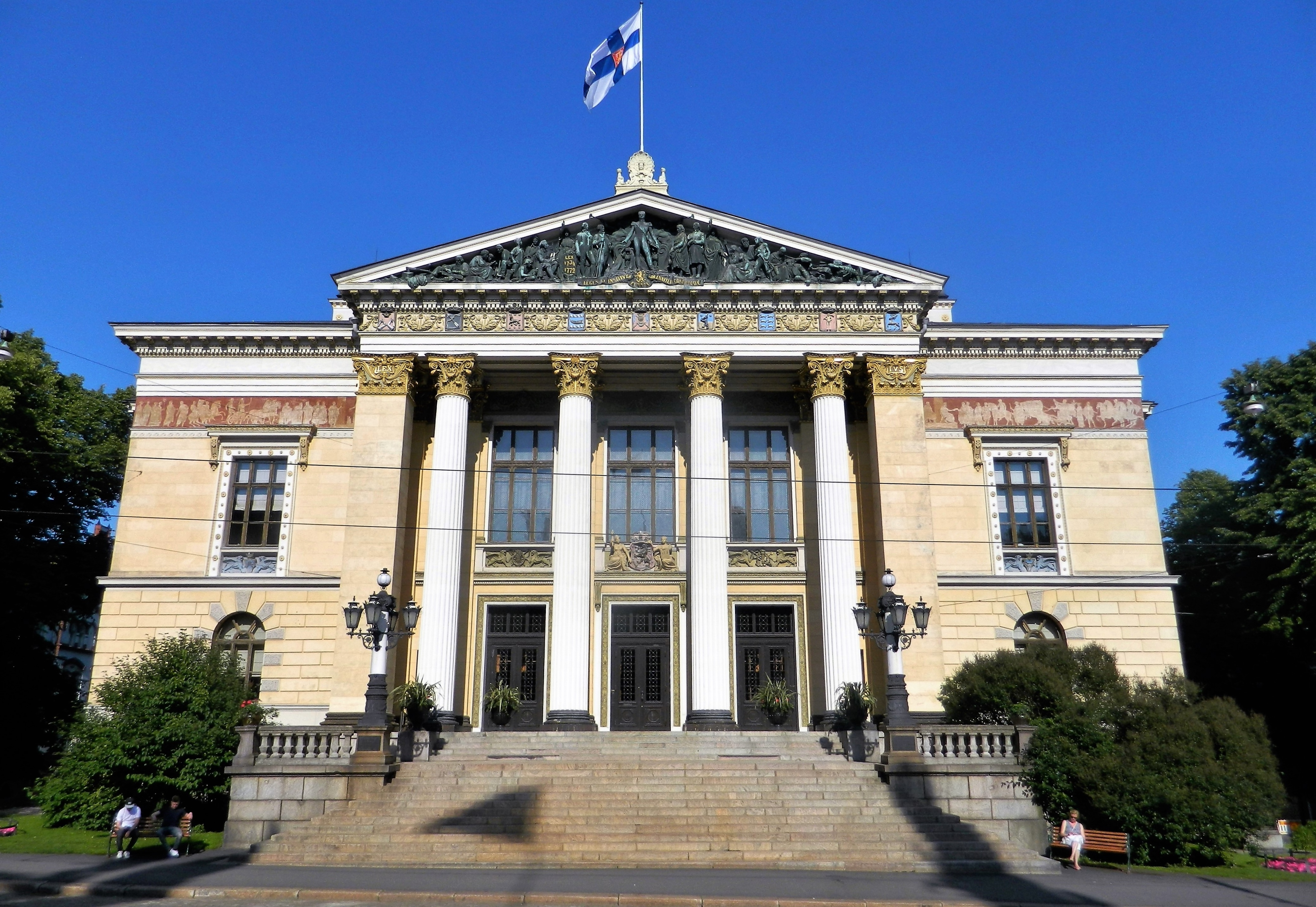
The House of the Estates.

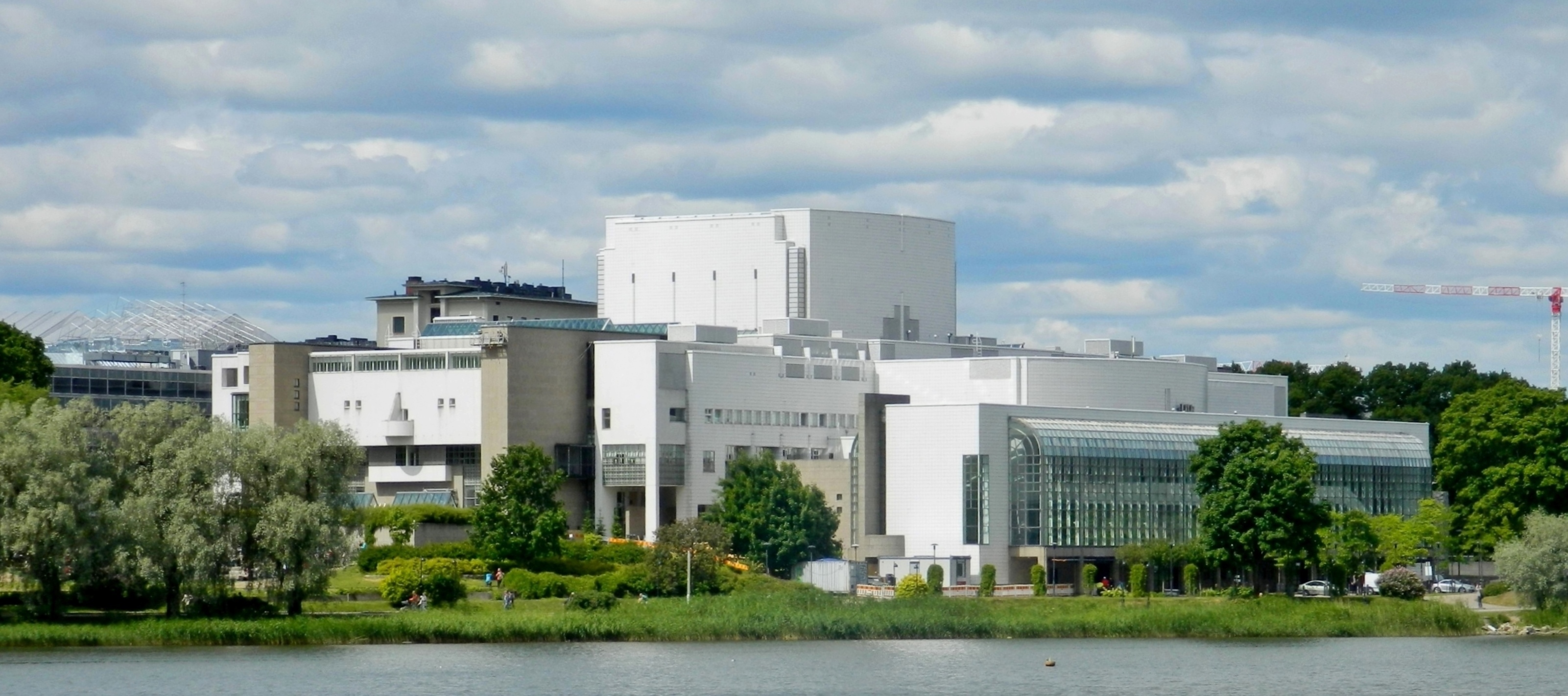
The Finnish National Opera Building.

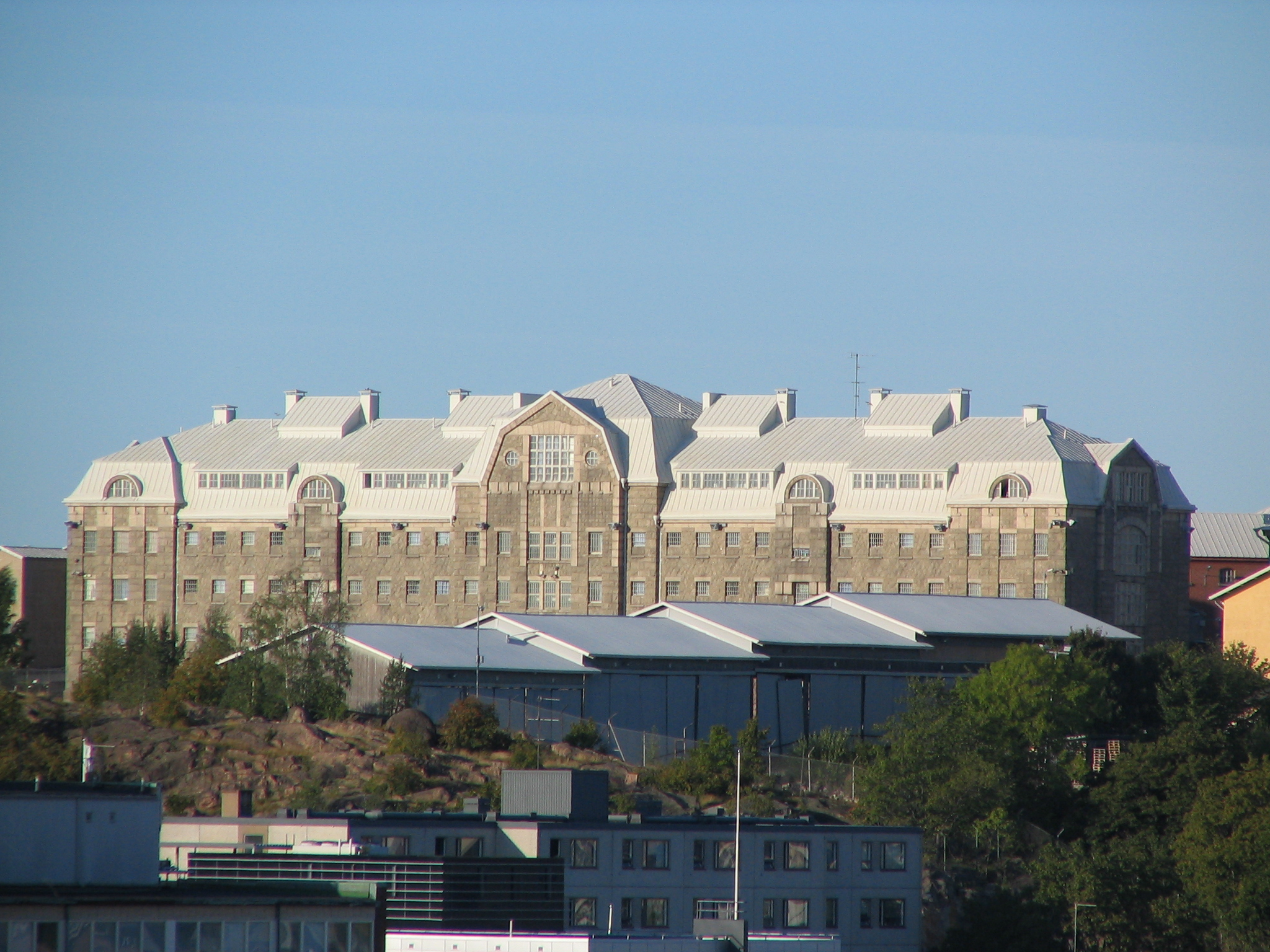
Turku Central Prison — “Kakola” — defunct since 2007.

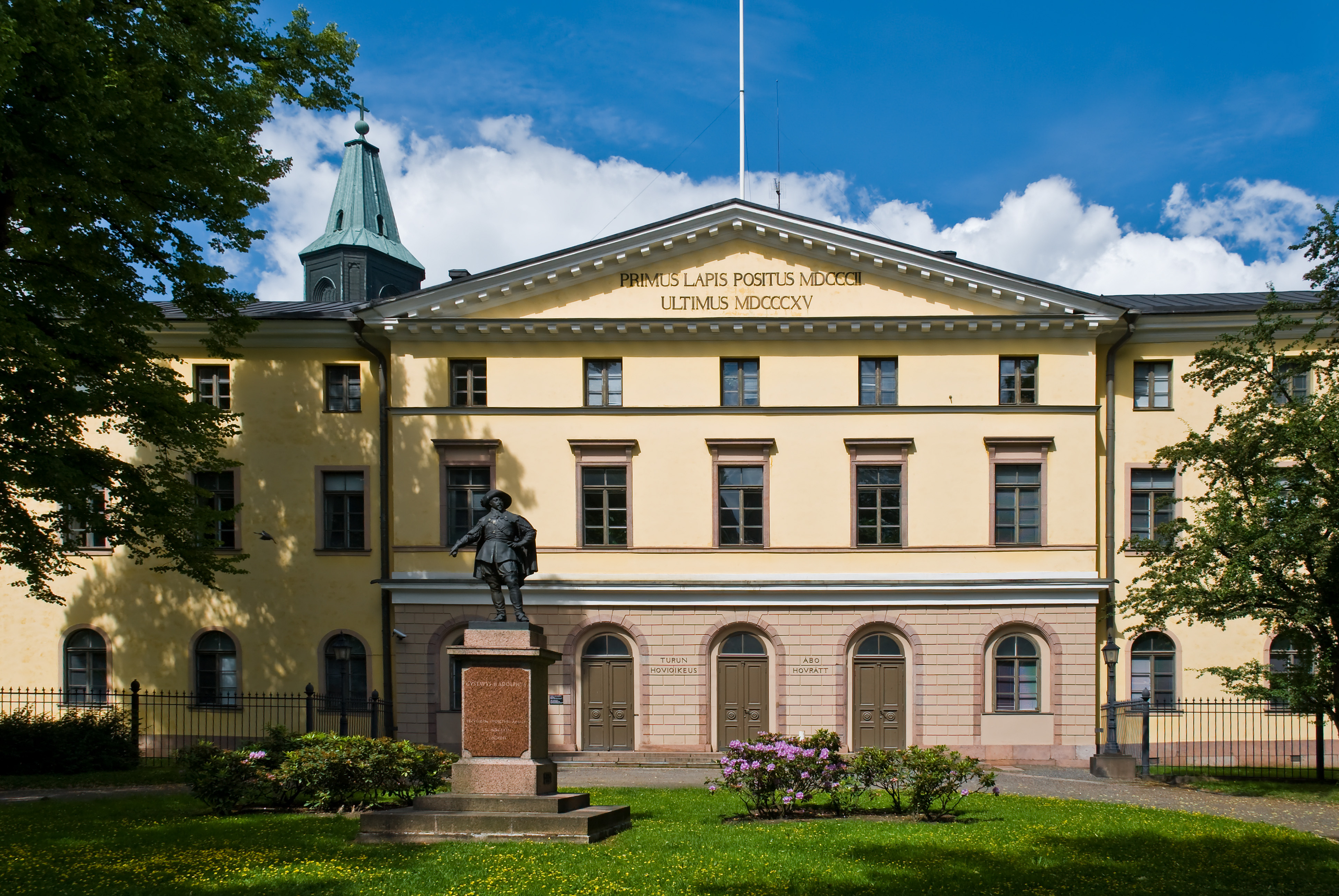
The building of the Court of Appeal in Turku.

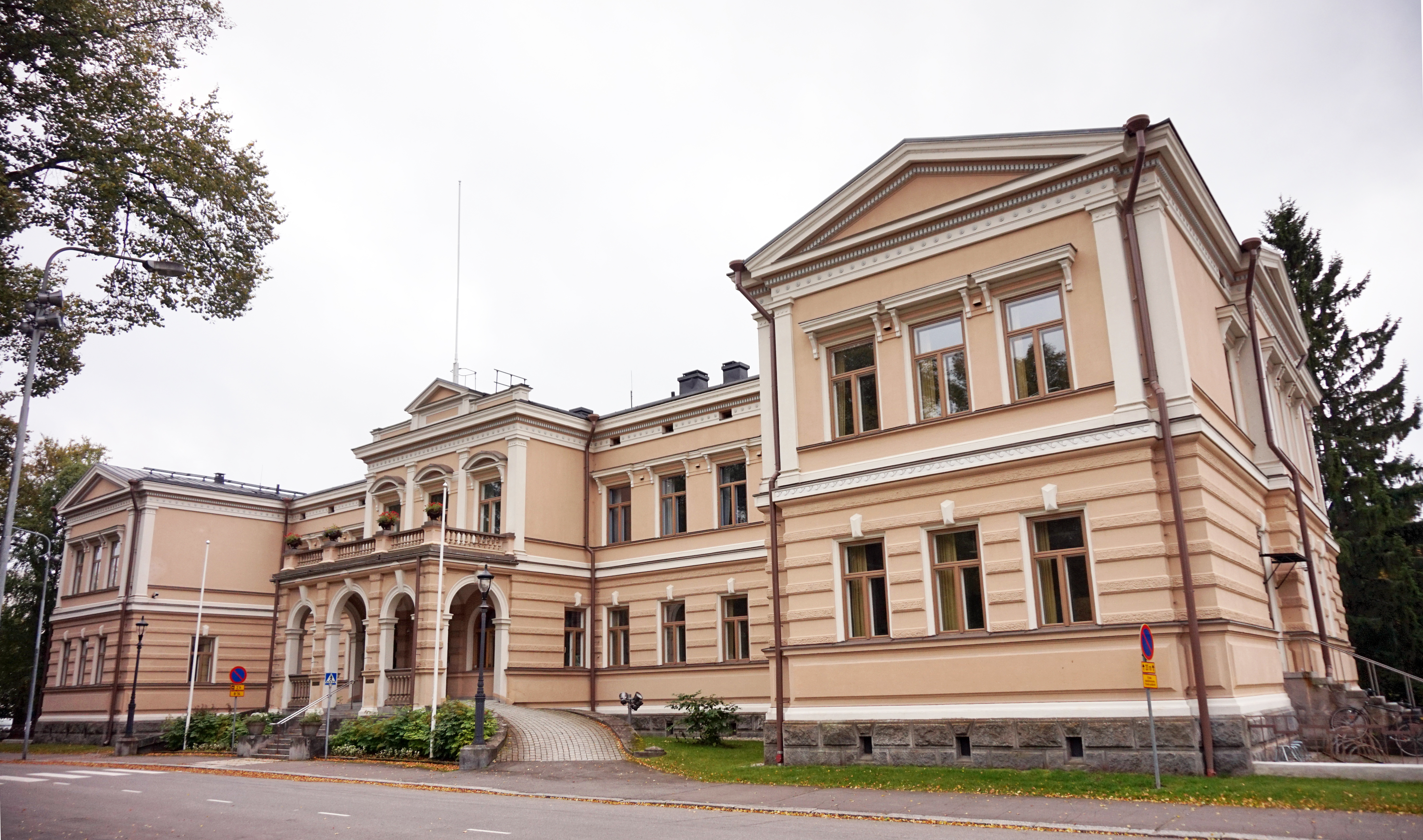
The State Provincial Office of Kuopio

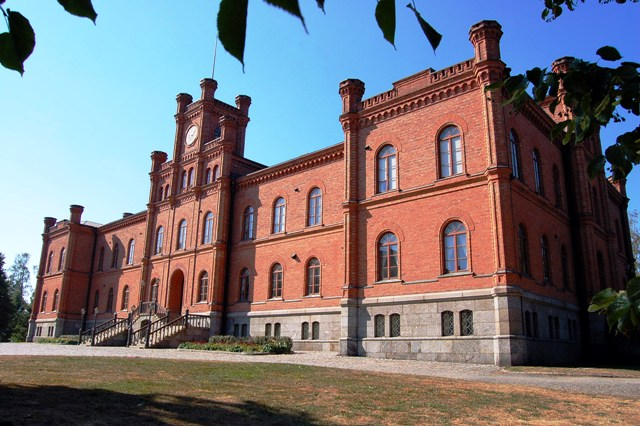
The building of the Court of Appeal in Vaasa.
