= Theodor Schauman =

Finnish major general

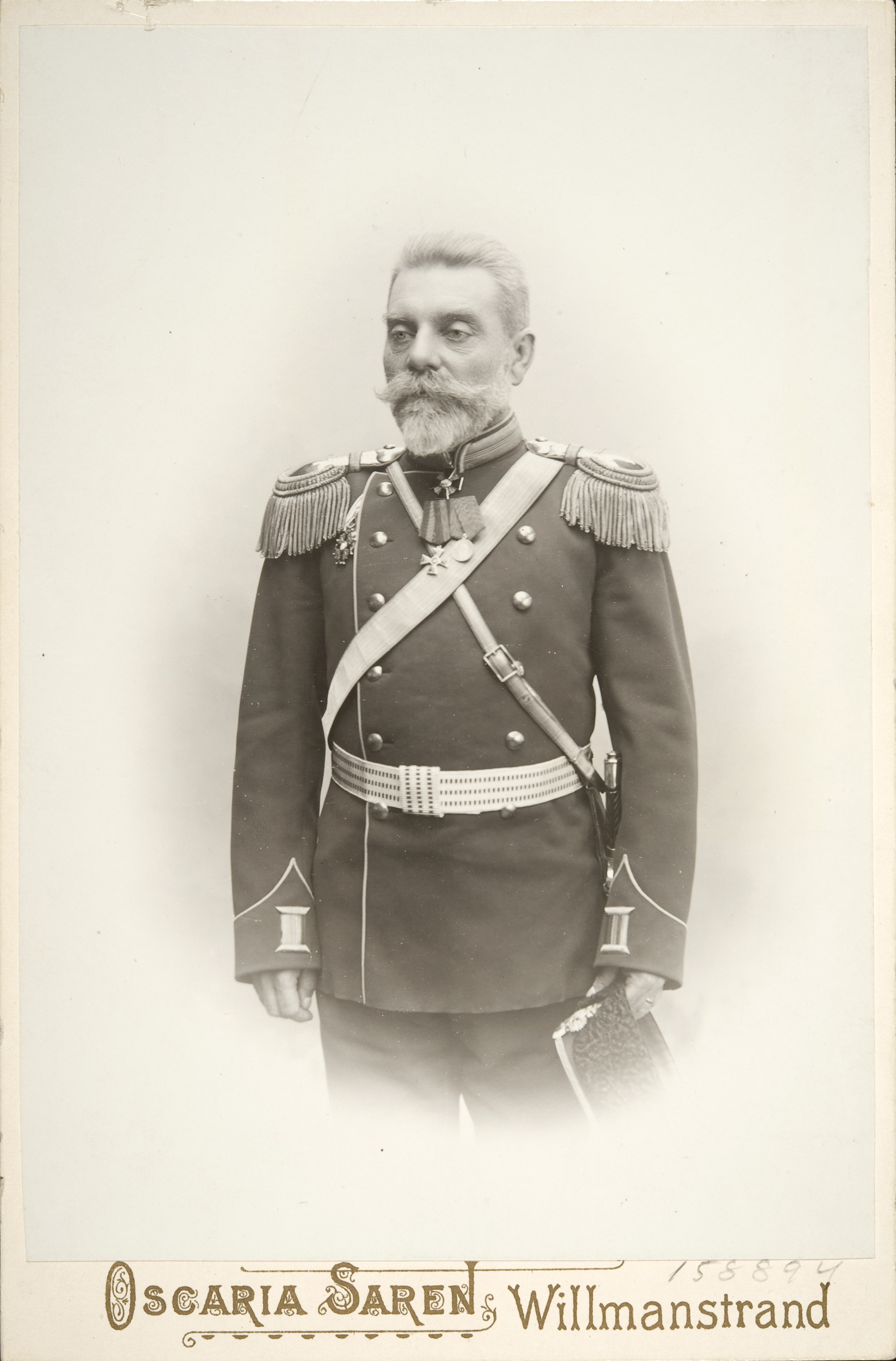
Theodor Schauman 1900-luvun alussa.

Oskar Theodor (Teodor) Schauman (October 13, 1849, Helsinki – March 11, 1931, Porvoo) was a Finnish major general (1919), and nobleman. He was the commander of the Finnish Dragoon Regiment from 1889 to 1901.

Schauman belonged to the noble Schauman family, which was entered into the Swedish House of Nobility in 1686 and the Finnish House of Nobility in 1818. Schauman graduated from the Finnish Cadet School in 1868 and then served in Russia. In 1868, he was appointed as a cornet in the Empress's Life Dragoon Regiment, where he served until 1889. He attended the officers' cavalry school from 1871 to 1873. Schauman was a member of the committee in 1887–1888 that considered the establishment of a cavalry regiment within the Finnish military. In 1889, he was transferred to the command of the Finnish Dragoon Regiment as a colonel. The regiment was based in Lappeenranta, and he developed it into a model unit. The regiment was disbanded in 1901, and Schauman, holding the rank of major general, was prematurely retired after opposing Nikolai Bobrikov.

In 1901, Schauman was elected as the agent of the Cities' General Fire Aid Association in Turku. He was a member of the Turku Fire Committee from 1902 to 1903 and its chairman from 1904 to 1918. After Finland gained independence, Schauman was the chairman of the committee in 1919 tasked with proposing the organization of Finland's defense forces, as well as the committee that drafted the proposal. In 1919, Schauman was also a member of the international committee for the demolition of the Åland Islands' fortifications.

Schauman's brother Waldemar Schauman's children were Sigrid and Eugen Schauman.
