= Waldemar Schauman =

Finnish politician (1844–1911)

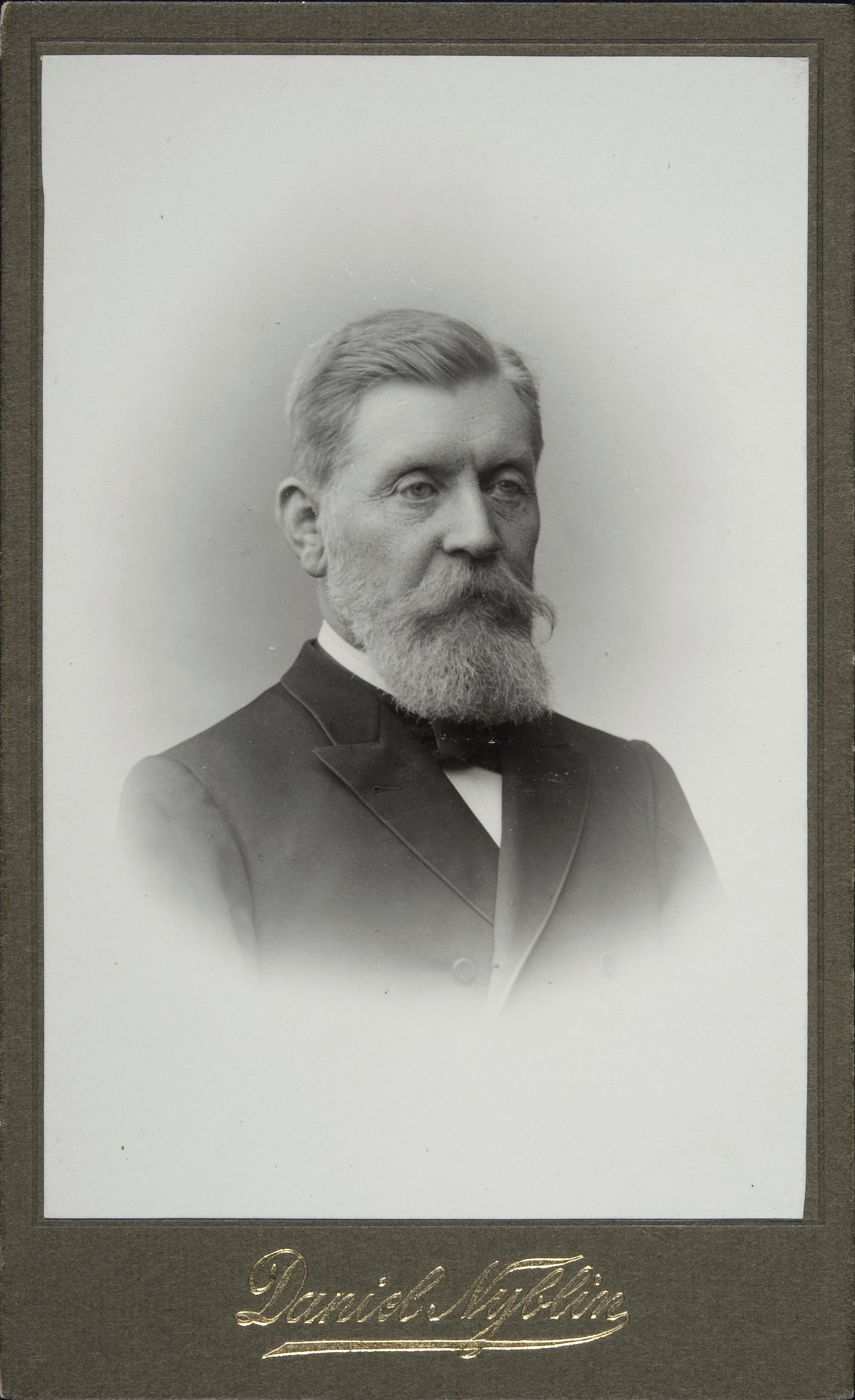
Schauman in 1900

Fredrik Waldemar Schauman (10 August 1844, Helsinki – 16 September 1911, Helsinki) was a Finnish politician and lieutenant general. He was a member of the Senate of Finland, the father of Eugen Schauman, and a member of the Schauman noble family. Schauman was also the cousin's son of Frans Ludvig, Berndt Otto, and August Schauman.

== Military career ==
Schauman began his studies in 1855 at the Finnish Cadet School in Hamina and graduated as a lieutenant in 1862. He then served in the 7th Sharpshooter Battalion and participated in suppressing the Polish uprising alongside other Russian troops in 1862–1863. He was promoted to sub-captain in 1864 and transferred to the 85th Vyborg Infantry Regiment in 1865.

In 1867, while attending the General Staff Officers’ Course at the Nikolaev General Staff Academy (1866–1868), he was promoted to captain. After completing the course in 1868, he was promoted to major and assigned to the General Staff of the Finnish Military District. In 1869, he was appointed senior adjutant to the headquarters of the Finnish Military District’s local forces in Helsinki, and in 1870, he became senior adjutant at the headquarters of the 23rd Infantry Division.

In 1872, Schauman was promoted to lieutenant colonel and assigned to the headquarters of the Kharkov Military District, where he was given special duties by the district commander in 1875. He was promoted to colonel and appointed chief of staff of the 7th Infantry Division in Radom, Poland, in 1878. In 1885, he became the Finnish military affairs representative at the Russian War Ministry and was promoted to major general in 1886. In 1888, he was appointed Chief of Staff of the Finnish Military Headquarters, and the following year, he became chairman of the Finnish Supreme Military Court. In 1894, he was appointed Governor of Vaasa and was promoted to lieutenant general in 1896.

== Other activities ==
Schauman represented his noble family, Schauman, in the Finnish Diet in 1888, 1891, 1894, 1897, 1900, and 1905–1906. In 1898, he became a member of the Finnish Senate’s Economic Department and head of the Military Affairs Committee. The following year, he retired from military service. While in the Senate, Schauman opposed the publication of the February Manifesto, considering it illegal. As a result, he resigned from his position as a senator in 1900.

From 1906 onwards, Schauman worked as the financial manager of Finland's General Fire Insurance Company.

After his son Eugen Schauman assassinated Nikolay Bobrikov, a house search was conducted, during which a plan for establishing a national shooting association to replace the abolished Finnish military was discovered. As a result, Schauman was arrested on suspicion of treason and taken into custody in St. Petersburg. However, after the assassination of Minister of State Vyacheslav von Plehve, the case was returned to Finland for review by the Turku Court of Appeal, which acquitted him, leading to his release in 1905.

Waldemar Schauman's daughter was the painter Sigrid Schauman. His son from his second marriage to Charlotte Ramsay, Colonel Carl-Gustaf Schauman (b. 1892), served as the artillery commander of the II Army Corps during the Winter War. He was involved in a car accident in February 1940 and succumbed to his injuries in May of the same year.
