= Georg Schauman =

Finnish historian, librarian and politician (1870–1930)

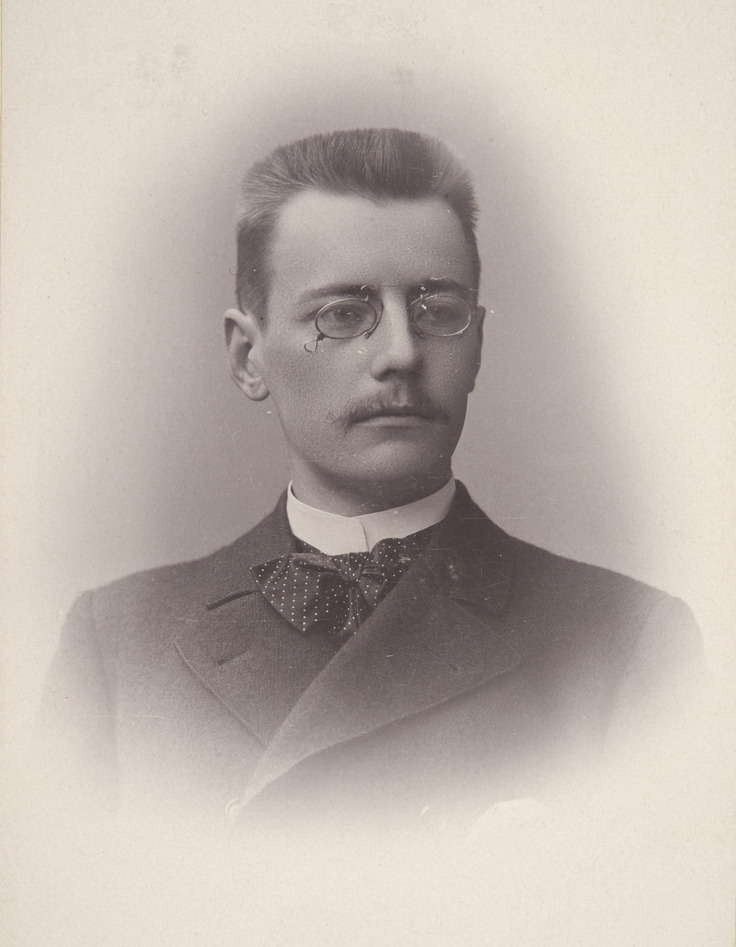
- Schauman, early 20th century, photo by Karl Emil Ståhlberg
- Born: 14 September 1870; Helsinki, Finland
- Died: 6 October 1930 (aged 60); Helsinki, Finland
- Occupation(s): Historian, librarian, politician
- Employer: University of Helsinki

Georg Carl August Schauman (14 September 1870 – 6 October 1930) was a Finnish historian, librarian, politician and member of the Schauman noble family. He was librarian at the University of Helsinki library, today the National Library of Finland, as well as a member of the Diet and later Parliament of Finland.

== Biography ==
Schauman was born in Helsinki to publicist August Schauman. He was the father of librarian Henrik Schauman.

Schauman attended the University of Helsinki, where he was vice chairman of the Prometheus Society for the promotion of freedom of religion. He graduated in 1887 and earned his doctorate in 1911, and was adjunct assistant professor at the university library (today the National Library of Finland) from 1889. He became assistant professor in 1893 and was also librarian of the scientific society's library in Helsinki from 1905 to 1914, when he was appointed university librarian.

He was a member of the Diet of Finland in 1897, 1899, 1900, from 1904 to 1905 and from 1905 to 1906 and of the Parliament of Finland from 1919 to 1930. He belonged to the Swedish People's Party of Finland until 1919 and to the Swedish Left after that. He was a presidential elector in the 1925 Finnish presidential election.

Together with Axel von Christierson, Schauman translated and edited Charles Gide's The Principles of Economics (1st edition 1899, 4th edition 1914) and published Anton Menger's Folkpolitik (1909) with a detailed biographical introduction. He also published and provided an introduction to the Society of Swedish Literature in Finland's edition of Pehr Kalm's En Resa til Norra America.

Schauman's works include Biographical Studies on Anders Chydenius (Biografiska undersökningar om Anders Chydenius, 1908; published by the Society of Swedish Literature in Finland), Studies in the National Economic Literature of the Age of Liberty. Ideas and trends 1718–1760 (Studier i Frihetstidens nationalekonomiska litteratur. Idéer och strömningar 1718-1760, academic thesis, 1910) and On the Management of Public Research Libraries (Om förvaltningen af offentliga forskarbibliotek, 1913). He compiled a number of essays in newspapers and magazines in Kulturhistoriska och andra uppsatser (1912).

A festschrift in honor of Schauman was published on the occasion of his 60th birthday.

Schauman died in Helsinki in 1930.

== Publications ==
- I frågan om Universitetsbiblioteket (1892)
- En boks historia (1904)
- Accroissement de la Bibliothéque de la Société des Sciences de Finlande, 1904-1914 (1906-14)
- Biografiska undersökningar om Anders Chydenius jämte otryckta skrifter af Chydenius (1908)
- Studier i frihetstidens nationalekonomiska litteratur (1910)
- Kulturhistoriska och andra uppsatser (1912)
- Ströftåg i utländska bibliotek (1912)
- Tables générales des publications de la Société des Sciences de Finlande 1838-1910 (1912)
- Om förvaltningen af offentliga forskarbibliotek (1913)
- Från Nikolai I:s och furst Menschikoffs tid (1916)
- Berättelse över universitetsbibliotekets förvaltning under läseåren 1914-1923 (1917-23)
- Yliopiston kirjaston hallinto ja toiminta lukuvuosina 1917-1923. Kertomus jonka Yliopiston Rehtorille on antanut ylikirjastonhoitaja (1920-24)
- Kampen om statsskicket i Finland 1918 (1924)
- Universitetsbibliotekets förvaltning och verksamhet under läseåren 1923-1926 (1926)
- Förteckning öfver svenska ortnamn i Finland (1897)
