= Schauman =

Swedish-Finnish noble family

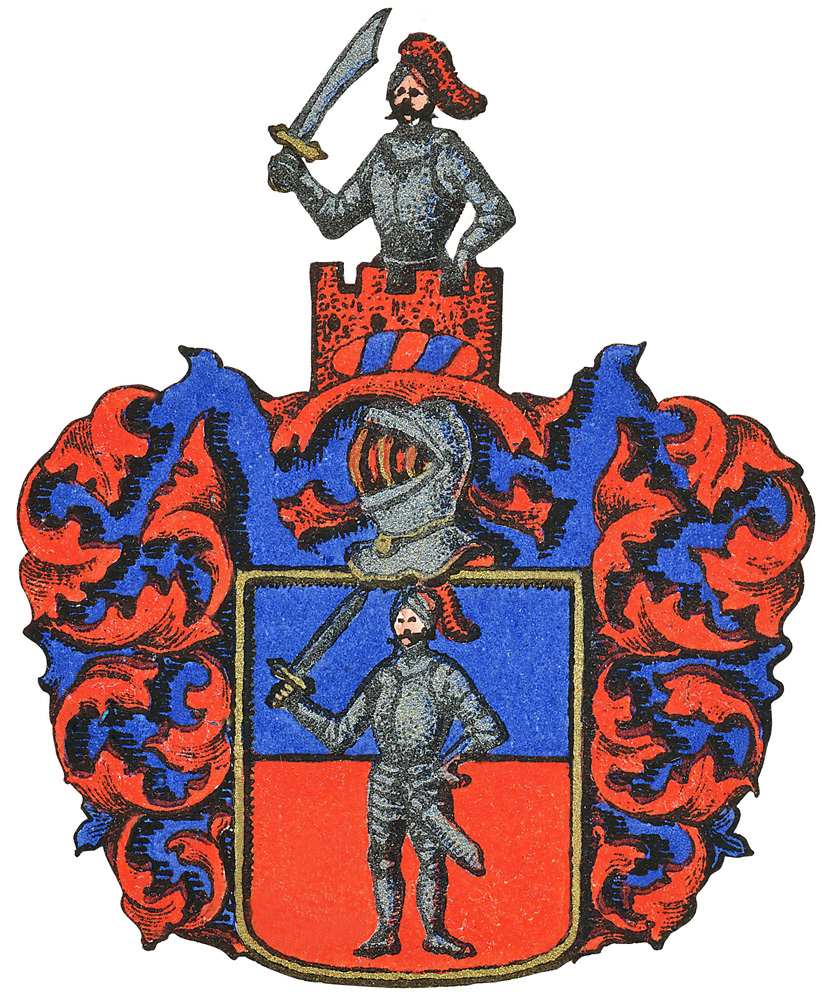
Coat of arms of the Schauman family

The Schauman family is a Swedish-Finnish noble family of German origin, introduced in both the Swedish House of Nobility and the Finnish House of Nobility. Originally known as a family of high-ranking soldiers, since the 1800s its representatives have become known in numerous other fields.

== History ==
The family is from the Baltic countries and moved to Finland at the end of the 1600s. It is considered to be from the nobility of Courland. However, according to an alternative theory the roots of the family could be in Kurpfalz, Germany, in which in 1596 a family with the same name was ennobled.

The Finnish ancestor of the family is lieutenant colonel Henrik Johan Schauman (1649–1730) of the Turku County Cavalry Regiment, who came from the Ogre region in Livonia and moved to Sweden in 1662. He was naturalized in the Swedish nobility in 1686 by Charles XI of Sweden and his family was introduced to the House of Knights in 1697 as a nobleman, number 1287.

Today's living branches are all descendants of his grandson, noble-muse Berndt Otto Schauman (1738–1805). In connection with the organization of the Finnish House of Nobility, Schaumans were marked there in 1818 as a noble family, number 96. Descendants of the family moved to Argentina in the late 19th century and in the 1920s to France; the family still lives in both countries. Alternative noble families have subsequently re-elected the right to represent the House of Knights. Schaumans are also living today in Paraguay and the United States.

The Schauman noble family is strongly international, as some of its branches have long existed even in South America.

== Notable members of the family ==
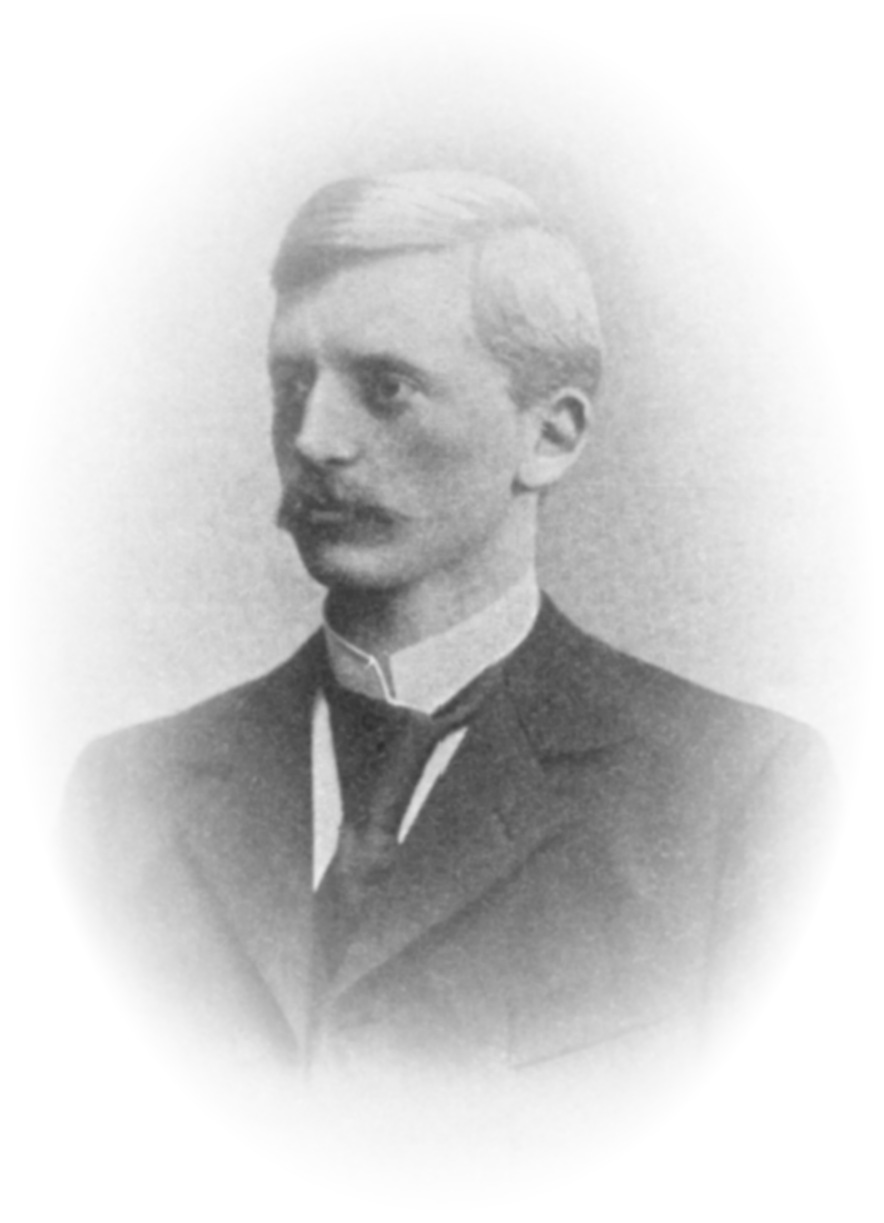
Eugen Schauman

- Henrik Johan Schauman (1649–1730), Swedish military officer.
- Berndt Otto Schauman (1738–1805), the housing master of the Finnish noble battalion, Heinisten official residence.
- Carl Schauman (1778–1852), Senate chamberlain, chamberlain advisor, the son of housing master Berndt Otto Schauman.
- Gustaf Schauman (1780–1846), captain, postmaster, the son of housing master Berndt Otto Schauman.
- Berndt Schauman (1786–1862), lieutenant, city bailiff of Uusikaupunki, the son of housing master Berndt Otto Schauman.
- Frans Ludvig Schauman (1810–1878), professor of theology, bishop of Porvoo, the son of Carl Schauman.
- Berndt Otto Schauman (1821–1895), curator of the Finnish Art Society, the son of Carl Schauman.
- Viktor Leonard Schauman (1822–1872), pharmacist and industrialist, the son of Berndt Schauman.
- August Schauman (1826–1896), politician, journalist, the son of Carl Schauman.
- Karl Frans Johan Schauman (1839–1883), official and member of parliament, the son of Frans Ludvig Schauman.
- Fredrik Waldemar Schauman (1844–1911), lieutenant general, senator, governor, the grandson of Gustaf Schauman.
- Hugo Rafael Schauman (1845–1879), journalist, the son of Frans Ludvig Schauman.
- Oskar Theodor Schauman (1849–1931), major general, commander of the Finnish Dragoon Regiment, the brother of Waldemar Schauman.
- August Michael Schauman (1852–1950), lawyer, legal advisor, mayor of Porvoo 1895–1915 and member of parliament, the son of Frans Ludvig Schauman.
- Axel Mortimer Schauman (1855–1903), merchant and businessman from Vaasa, the son of Victor Leonhard Schauman.
- Wilhelm Schauman (1857–1911), industrial magnate, mining counselor, the son of Victor Leonhard Schauman.
- Berndt Gustaf Knut Björn Waldemar Schauman (1857–1914), lawyer, mayor of Tammisaari 1889–1907 and member of parliament.
- Anna Schauman (1859–1928), children's author.
- Viktor Rafael Schauman (1860–1946), major general, first commander of the Cadet School, the nephew of Victor Leonhard Schauman.
- Ossian Schauman (1862–1922), professor of internal medicine, founder of Folkhälsan, the son of Victor Leonhard Schauman.
- Georg Schauman (1870–1930), librarian, historian, politician, the son of August Schauman.
- Viktor Schauman (1870–1936), agricultural advisor.
- Einar Ossian Schauman (1874–1939), lawyer, official and member of parliament.
- Eugen Schauman (1875–1904), activist, assassin of General Governor Nikolai Bobrikov, the son of Waldemar Schauman.
- Sigrid Maria Schauman (1877–1979), painter and critic, the daughter of Waldemar Schauman.
- Harry Schauman (1879–1932), industrialist, founder of the Harry Schauman Foundation, the son of Axel Schauman.
- Erik Rafael Schauman (1894–1987), medical advisor, the son of Viktor Rafael Schauman.
- Eric Balder Björnson Schauman (1895–1966), Jaeger colonel, CEO, the nephew of Viktor Rafael Schauman.
- Runar Schauman (1908–1977), actor, theater director, the nephew of Viktor Rafael Schauman.
- Henrik Schauman (1916–1996), head librarian of the parliament, professor, the son of Georg Schauman.
- Göran Schauman (b. 1940), actor, the son of Runar Schauman.
- Heidi Schauman (b. 1978), economist.
- Ida Schauman (b. 1989), politician, chairperson of Svensk Ungdom.

== See also ==
- Finnish nobility
- Swedish-speaking Finns
- Swedish Knights Room
