= Harry Schauman =

Finnish philanthropist and businessman

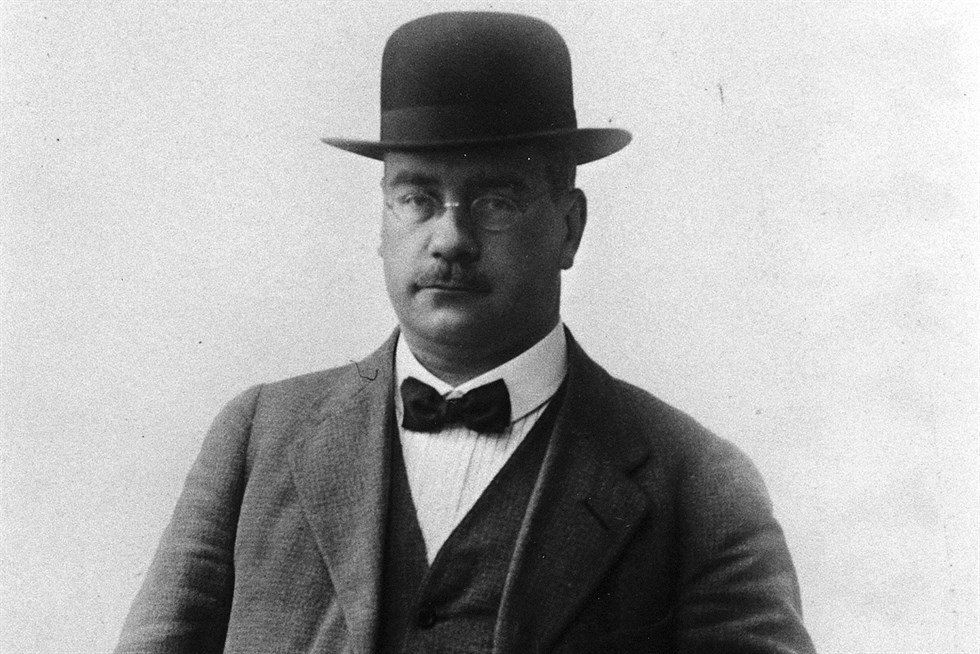
Harry Schauman

Harry Schauman (November 22, 1879, Vaasa – February 11, 1932, Helsinki) was a Finnish businessman, philanthropist, and member of the Schauman noble family. Schauman inherited a significant fortune from his parents. His father was the merchant Axel Schauman (1855–1903) and his mother was Hanna Schauman (1859–1917). After becoming a widow, Hanna Schauman managed the family’s business conglomerate in Vaasa and founded the Vaasa Steam Bakery. Harry Schauman gained financial control of both the Vaasa Steam Bakery and the Vaasa Steam Mill. He was also the largest private property owner in Vaasa.

== Early life ==
Schauman graduated as a student from Vaasa Swedish Lyceum in 1900. He traveled to Scandinavian countries, Switzerland, France, and Italy for study tours. Schauman was the Belgian vice-consul in Vaasa and a member of the Vaasa city council from 1922 to 1924. He was also the vice president of The Royal Life Saving Society in London and an honorary member of the Finnish Swedish Sports Federation, Vaasa Swimming Club, and Helsinki Swimming Club.

Schauman founded Vasa IFK (1900), Vaasa Swimming Club (1902), and the Swedish-Österbotnian Society, to which he bequeathed most of his fortune.

In 1937, the Harry Schauman Foundation was established to promote science, education, and Swedish-language culture in Swedish-speaking Ostrobothnia. It owns a significant amount of real estate in Vaasa. In the late 1980s, the foundation invested in newspapers, and in 1998 it founded the HSS Media Ab group, which includes Vasabladet, Österbottens Tidning, and Syd-Österbotten, and formerly also the Finnish-language Pietarsaaren Sanomat.
