= Arthur Frenckell =

Finnish politician and journalist (1861–1933)

Arthur Reinhold Frenckell (31 May 1861 – 24 November 1933) was a Finland-Swedish journalist and politician.

== Biography ==
Frenckells parents were Otto Reinhold Frenckell och Josephine Dobrowolsky. He graduated in 1880 and became a Bachelor of Arts in 1882 and a Master of Arts in 1891. During this period, he wrote, among other things, theater criticism for the newspaper Helsingfors 1881–1882 and contributed to Stockholms Dagblad 1883–1885, as well as serving as a correspondent for several Finnish newspapers.

In 1885, Frenckell took over the newspaper Hufvudstadsbladet after the founder August Schauman sold it for 80,000 marks. In the autumn of 1888, Frenckell established his own printing house, Hufvudstadsbladets Nya Tryckeri, since the old printing house no longer had enough capacity for the newspaper. Under Frenckell's leadership, the newspaper and its printing house developed into Finland's most modern newspaper house. Frenckell introduced the first rotary press in Finland in 1896. The newspaper's circulation had risen to approximately 20,000 in 1900 and to 30,000 in 1914.

In 1921 Frenckell was forced to sell the majority stake in the newspaper and printing company to Amos Anderson. A new company, Hufvudstadsbladets Förlags och Tryckeri Ab, was formed. Frenckell remained as editor-in-chief and minority owner until 1928.

Frenckell was also active in municipal life in Helsinki and participated in the diets of Finland of 1891 and 1897 as the representative of the city of Nykarleby. He was a member of the City Council of Helsinki from 1889 to 1900 and from 1905 to 1908 and was a member of the Swedish People's Party's central board from 1907 to 1909. Frenckell was chairman of, among others, Boktryckarföreningen 1904–1906, Finlands publicistförbund and Finlands Tidningsförläggareförbund 1916–1925.

Frenckell was married three times: 1883 with Hedvig Rosina von Haartman, 1892 with Anne Charlotte Resbeck and 1918 with Agot Kerstin Athenaïse Stavenow.
