= Finnish Dragoon Regiment =

20th Finnish Dragoon Regiment
- 20-й Драгунский Финляндский Полк; 20y Dragunskiy Finlyandskiy Polk
- Active: 1806–1860; 1889–1901; 1901–1918
- Country: Russian Empire; Russian Republic post Feb 1917
- Branch: Imperial Russian Army; Russian Army post Feb 1917
- Type: Cavalry
- Size: Regiment
- Part of: Finland Inspectorate
- Headquarters & Depot: Villmanstrand, Grand Duchy of Finland
- Nickname(s): "The Black Dragoons"
- Engagements: Napoleonic Wars; Russo-French War; Finnish War; War of the Sixth Coalition; Polish Revolution; Crimean War; The Great War

Commanders
- Notable commanders: Major General Prince Nikolai Levanovich Melikov

The 20th Finnish Dragoon Regiment (Russian: 20-й драгунский Финляндский полк, romanized: 20y Dragunskiy Finlyandskiy Polk) was a cavalry regiment of the Imperial Russian Army which saw service during the later half of the 19th Century and beginning of the 20th before disbanding following the October Revolution. Three regiments went by the name of 'Finnish Dragoon Regiment', of which the 20th was the last.

== First Regiment (1806) ==
=== Formation ===
Following the end of the War of the Third Coalition, the Russian Army was gradually expanded. On 23 June 1806, an imperial decree ordered the formation of several new dragoon regiments, among them was the Finnish Dragoon Regiment, along with the Mittau (Mitavsky), and in August the Arzamass, Yamburg, Libau, Nezhinsk, Serpukhov, Tiraspol, and Dorpat Dragoon Regiments. On 23 June 1806 the new regiment was formed in the town of Usvyatsky in the Vitebsk Province from one squadron each of the following: His Majesty's Life Cuirassier Regiment, and the Kargopol, Riga, and Kazansky Dragoon Regiments, along with a half squadron from the Livonian Dragoon Regiment. On formation the regiment joined the 14th Infantry Division which was in turn part of the I Army Corps based around the city of Orël.

The new regiment comprised five 'field' squadrons along with a depot/training half-squadron. This meant the regiment had a strength of 1,063 officers and other ranks and 899 combat horses. Soon after a new uniform was granted which was as follows: black peaked front and rear helmet and was surmounted with a leather comb. This was topped with a black leather comb, on top of which sat a mighty, horsehair crest. The hair was black for troopers, red for musicians, and black with a white front, having a vertical orange stripe, for non-commissioned officers. Officers in the field wore white crests with a black tip, separated from the white body by an orange ring. The front was covered with a brass plate bearing the crowned double-eagle badge. The uniform consisted of a light green tunic, with white collars, cuffs, and shoulder straps with red edging, yellow buttons and buff turnbacks. Buff waistcoats, white breeches and belts, high cuffed boots. Officers worse an aiguillette on the right shoulder in yellow, and two buttonholes in yellow on each side of the tunic, below the lapels. The square shabraque and holster covers were in white, edged with yellow. The harness was black.

=== Prussian Campaign ===
By February 1807 the regiment was sent to the front in Prussia where it first saw action at the Battle of Bergfried on 3 February which ended in a French victory. After moving back towards the frontier, the regiment settled in what is now the Warmian-Masurian Voivodeship and remained in the rear for a short time.

On 5 and 6 June however, the regiment was back in the frontline under command of General Leving August, Graf von Bennigsen's field army was engaged at the Battle of Guttstadt-Deppen. However, after a short skirmish the Russians were unable to cross the bridgehead and the French VI Corps under Marshal Michel Ney withdrew. The short action resulted in a strategic victory for the Russians.

On 7 June a false document was captured by the Russians indicating that Ney's forces would soon attack Bennigsen's army from the rear. The army therefore withdrew towards the heavily fortified town of Heilsberg and waiting for the impending attack.

After a short rest the army was on the move again, and on 10 June the forces of Emperor Napoleon and the Graf von Bennigsen met at the field of Heilsberg. Here, the Russian 6th and 8th Divisions held off a large French force until reinforcements in the form of the 3rd, 7th, and 14th Divisions arrived in due course. The Finnish Dragoons, still part of the 14th Division arrived shortly thereafter being thrown straight into the fray near the Prussian cavalry. The Finnish Dragoons and the other cavalry regiments of the division (Mittau Dragoons and Grodno Hussars) were grouped with the Right Wing Cavalry of Major General Kamenskoi. The wing charged through and inflicted heavy damage on Divisional General Louis-Vincent-Joseph de Saint-Hilaire's division. By the end of the day, the Russian forces were victorious and the French forces withdrew.

On 14 June, the main Russian army was engaged at the Battle of Friedland, though a large force under command of Major General Nikolay Borozdin was detached to the garrison in Allenburg. This force consisted of the Chevalier Guard Regiment, Finnish Dragoons, Mitau Dragoon Regiment, Preobrazhensky Life Guards Regiment, and 3 x artillery batteries.

Following the Treaties of Tilsit, Bennisgen's Army was withdrawn back into European Russia and its troops redistributed to their divisional garrison areas The Finnish Dragoons were subsequently moved to the Polotsky Uyezd in the Vitebsk Governorate where it had been raised. Because the regiment had been sent almost straight into action, proper standards weren't granted until 11 May 1807, though these in turn didn't take effect until the regiment's return to Vitebsk. The first regimental standards consisted of two types: the 'Tsar's/Colonel's colours': white with green corners, and the 'Regimental colours': four green corners with white edged, both of which were gold embroidery and fringe.

=== Russo-Swedish War ===
Following around a year of peacetime garrison service and training, the regiment was transferred to the Baltic coast in preparation for the coming Finnish War. Following the Russian takeover of Åbo (Turku), a division was detached from the Baltic region comprising the following units: Nevsky, Libavsky, and Brest Musketeer Regiments (6 x companies each), Pernovsky Regiment (1 x battalion), Grodno Hussars (1 x squadron), 2 x squadrons of the Finnish Dragoons, 1 x artillery battery, and 15 x gunboats. This small force was detached from the main garrison to attack the nearby Swedish transport vessels before they could launch an attack.

On 2 March 1808 a Russian field army commanded by the drunken General Friedrich Wilhelm von Buxhoeveden began a two month long siege on the 'Gibraltar of the North', the Sveaborg Fortress just off the coast from Helsingfors (Helsinki). The Finnish Dragoons joined the siege sometime after the occupation of Lovisa (Loviisa), and would remain until the end of the siege on 3 May. Historian Digby Smith notes that, "[the fall of the fortress] in such a shameful way dealt a crushing blow to Swedish morale and led to the abandonment of Finland to Russia". During the battle, the regiment formed part of the cavalry force of the 17th Division, commanded by Lieutenant General Prince Andrey Gorchakov and comprised 4 x squadrons of 23 officers and 631 other ranks.

By 20 March the Russian field army was distributed to various areas along the south-western coast. The Finnish Dragoons were also separated as follows: 1 x squadron of 5 officers and 125 other ranks under the 3rd Detachment, 21st Division in Åbo, 3 x squadrons of 18 officers and 306 other ranks at the Sveaborg Fortress Detachment and 1 x squadron of 5 officers and 110 other ranks at Svartholm Fortress, and a troop of 61 other ranks at Borgå (Porvoo), the three being part of the 17th Division.

By 19 June, the regiment landed on the mainland Swedish Finland and advanced westwards towards the town of St Karins (Kaarina) where a small Russian force took up defensive positions along the coast. The local troops, including the Finnish Dragoons were sent towards the coast where a combined Swedish landing force under command of Major General Eberhard von Vegesack attempted a landing. On 20 June, a squadron of the Finnish Dragoons arrived in the area together with 3 x companies of the Brest Musketeer Regiment and 2 x guns from the 25th Artillery Brigade. The squadron didn't see any direct action and only remained in the reserve during this action. Following the Swedish withdrawal, 1/2 of the squadron remained in the area for local garrison duty while the other 1/2 of the squadron returned to the regiment in Åbo. The regiment was later involved at the minor action in Tammerfors (Tampere).

Following the Treaty of Fredrikshamn (Hamina), the Russian occupation of Finland was confirmed and the Grand Duchy of Finland was created as an 'semi-autonomous' region of the Russian Empire. As a consequence of the treaty, the Grand Duchy could only raise militia and local forces in times of invasion, and the Imperial Russian Army became responsible for its defence.

=== Short peace ===
In 1809, the Russian forces in the Grand Duchy were reorganised. The regiment was consequently added to the 5th Brigade of the 1st Cavalry Division, itself part of the 2nd Army Corps. This corps was now the sole higher formation tasked with defence of the newly gained territory. The regiment also became the sole Finnish unit and began to recruit more Finns, in addition to setting up a new headquarters and depot in Villmanstrand (Lappeenranta).

On 12 October 1811, several officers and lower ranks were detached from the regiment to help with the formation of the new Astrakhan Cuirassier Regiment.

By 10 December 1811 the 2nd Army Corps was withdrawn from Finland and the defence of the region left to the 21st Infantry Division. The division slowly grew so that it not only covered Finland, but also Åland. That same month, regimental precedence was granted to the cavalry, and the Finnish Dragoons became 11th. Soon the defence of Finland was expanded back up to corps size, and became the 'Finnish Corps'. The 6th and 25th Divisions soon joined, along with the newly formed 27th Cavalry Brigade, the later of which now comprised the Finnish and Mitau Dragoons.

=== Patriotic War ===
By the time of the French invasion of Russia, the Finnish Corps had expanded almost two-fold, but rather unusually was tasked with remaining in Finland and not joining the main Russian armies in Belarus and Western Russia. After news of the beginning of the Siege of Riga reached the War Office, the Finnish Corps was dispatched to Estonia. Just before moving to Estonia, the 'Army of Finland' comprised the 6th and 21st Division, of which the Finnish Dragoons of Loschtschilin's Cossacks formed the Cavalry Brigade within the 21st Division. The Finnish Dragoons at this point had a strength of three squadrons.

On August 20 the regiment arrived in the outskirts of the city and formed part of the reserve. By 18 December 1812 the French-led X Corps retreated after an almost 5 month long siege, leaving the Russians victorious.

== Second Regiment (1889) ==
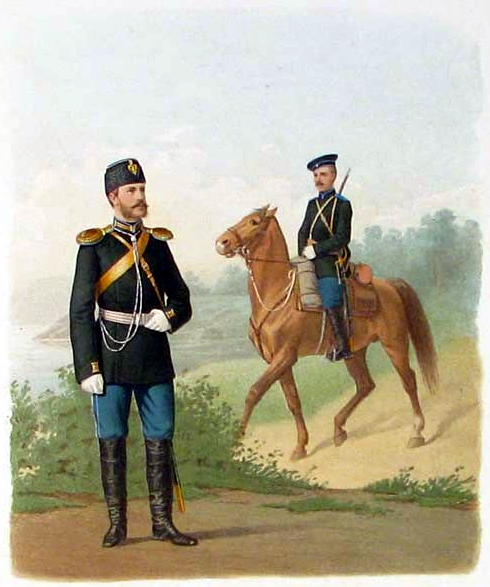
Uniform variations of the regiment after formation in 1889. The dismounted officer is in "full dress" used during parades, inspections, and in battle. The mounted trooper is in "campaign dress".

After the failures of the Russian Army during the Crimean War, several new local units and formations were raised throughout the Russian Empire. In the Grand Duchy of Finland, a new semi-autonomous 'Finnish Army' was created which comprised several local rifle battalions and along with a new dragoon regiment. On 17 April 1889, the Finnish Dragoon Regiment was formed in Villmanstrand (Lappeenranta) at the strength of one 'troop' or platoon. By 1891 the regiment was at full strength with 6 'sabre' squadrons and one depot/training squadron.

The new regiment soon received a new nickname, the "Black Dragoons" as the Finnish officers had spoiled their men and gave them "new, expensive Black horses". The exception to this was the trumpeteers who were mounted on light grey horses as per tradition.

Following the passage of the highly controversial Conscription Act of 1889, the Russian Army was expanded and conscription became mandatory for all citizens. However, the Finns held the belief that because they were an autonomous part of the empire, they could vote on the issue themselves. After a vote by the State Duma, and later a decree by Emperor Nicholas II, the Finns were forced to adopt the new law, and the autonomy of the Duchy brought into question. After the forced adoption of said law in early 1898, the Finnish government was expected to enact it or face the consequences. This law was one of many which began undermining Finnish autonomy in addition to bring the army's ability to make its own decisions into question, something which would have a profound impact on the Russian Revolution. After three years, no consensus had been made and the Ministry of War informed the regiment's commander of the decision to disband the regiment instead of retain it, though many officers were not satisfied with the decision of the Duma. However, to many Finnish peoples' surprise, all the Finnish units were not only to be disbanded, but be in-fact reformed and the Finns allowed to stay in their regiments if they pleased. The old Finnish rifle battalions were therefore disbanded and subsequently reformed as new 'Finnish Rifle Regiments' at three-battalion sized. Many senior officers were dissatisfied with how the situation was handled, and more than half of the regiment's officers resigned shortly after.

== Third Regiment (1901) ==
On 4 December 1901, the 55th Finnish Dragoon Regiment was formed in Villmanstrand (Lappeenranta) by merging several 'troops' of different dragoon regiments, including: Moscow, Novorossiysk, Kargopol, Kinburn, Novotroitsky-Yekaterinoslav, Glupovskoye, Astrakhan, Saint Petersburg, Smolensky, Lithuanian, Kurlyandsky, Kharkov, Volynsky, Voznesensky, Sumy, Elisavetgrad, Alexandria, Belarussky, Pavlogradsky, Mariupol, Klyastitsky, and Lubensky. The new regiment comprised six squadrons, numbered 1st–6th and divided into two "divisions", each of three squadrons.

=== Pre-Great War ===
On 6 December 1907 the regiment was raised in rank following a reorganisation of the Dragoons, and became the 20th Finnish Dragoon Regiment. Sometime in 1913 or 1914, the regiment joined the recently formed 22nd Army Corps, which oversaw all units within the Grand Duchy of Finland.

By 1914, a regimental depot squadron had been setup in Villmanstrand, this left the regiment in a unique position as it was the only cavalry regiment to have its own squadron. The squadron however in theory was only under the regiment for administrative purposes, as it reported to the Army Remount Department for all other means. During peacetime the squadron was composed of around 594 officers and men, 696 horses, and was under the regimental headquarters when not mobilised.

=== Mobilisation ===
At the outbreak of war in August 1914, the peace and war establishments of a cavalry regiment were practically the same. A squadron consists of about 150 men. The war establishment of a regiment may be taken as 1,000 of all ranks, and its fighting strength as 850 sabres. Each regiment had two specialist trained 'detachments', they were the reconnaissance group and the other were trained as pioneers tasked with the destruction of objects, etc. The reconnaissance troops worse a stripe of dark orange braid down the centre of the shoulder-strap. The pioneers wear a special badge on the sleeve consisting of a crossed shovel and pickaxe.

In addition to the two specialist groups, a machine gun detachment of 8 x guns (typically the Maxim heavy machine-gun) would be attached to the senior regiment in a cavalry division. The regimental depot squadron when mobilised is doubled, to form two 'marching' (or field) squadrons and one dismounted detachment. The marching squadrons are sent to the 'field regiment' as soon as possible, while the dismounted detachment remained at the depot for training. When mobilised, the 20th's marching squadrons were composed of 201 officers and men, compared to the normal 191 for all other cavalry regiments. There were also 181 horses attached to the mounted squadron.

The regimental uniform in 1914 consisted of the following: grey-blue breeches with a yellow thin stripe down length-wise on the entire leg, yellow thin stripe on the shoulder strap, with dark green piping on the great coat and collar patches. The regimental epaulette consisted of a script "D" with light blue stencilling. Because the regiment formed part of the Finland Inspectorate for administrative purposes, an "ef" (Ф) roughly equivalent to an English "F" was added with crimson stencilling below.

The only difference with respect to the tunics compared to the infantry branch was that the cavalry had pointed cuffs. The caps were often worn peakless, but again followed the pattern used by the infantry. Fur caps were worn in winter. The rank and file were equipped with the 'dragoon version' (the shorter version) of the loved Mosin–Nagant bolt-action rifle (with strap), cartridge pouch (or bandolire), bayonet and sword.

The war establishment of the regiment after mobilisation (not including the depot squadrons) was therefore divided into the following: 36 officers, 5 'officials' (medical officers, veterinary officer, accountant, and chaplain), 87 Non-commissioned officers, 833 combat 'rank and file', 60 non-combatants (everything from clerks, medical and veterinary dressers, chaplain's orderlies, armourers, and transport drivers), and 1,062 horses.

In August 1914, the regiment (along with all other Finnish units, except that of the Guards) were under the command of the 22nd Army Corps, which had its headquarters in Helsingfors (Helsinki) in the Grand Duchy of Finland. This corps in turn reported to the massive Saint Petersburg Military District.

=== War Service ===
At the outbreak of the Great War, the regiment was grouped with the Officer's Cavalry School Regiment to form the new 4th Separate Cavalry Brigade. Like so many other Russian cavalry regiments, the Finnish Dragoons remained in reserve and were only really used for breakout, reconnaissance, and dismounted guard duties.

In June 1915, an operation was planned so that the 4th Cavalry Brigade along with several infantry divisions would assault the German positions behind the frontlines with support from the Baltic Fleet. The amphibious assault was about to be launched but was cancelled following news of the Gorlice–Tarnów offensive failure and the forces withdrew. By this point the regiment was in the area of Dvinsk in today's Latvia.

From 28 December 1916 the regiment was further grouped with the 5th Gorzhdinsky and 10th Rypinsky Frontier Horse Regiments under the 17th Cavalry Division.

Between 5 and 11 January 1917, the regiment took part in the Mitava Operation, this was the only major operation the regiment would take part in however.

=== Disbandment ===
In 1918, the regiment was finally disbanded as a result of the dissolution of the army following the October Revolution.

== Church ==
As per tradition, many regiments in the Imperial Russian Army built and used a 'regimental church', which remained in a town/city which was considered sacred. The Finnish Dragoons built one in 1902 at the cost of around 17,000 rubles granted by the army, along with 8,000 rubles donated by the hereditary honorary citizen N. A. Protopopov. In 1911, a further 5,000 rubles were donated by Emperor of all the Russias, Nicholas II.

It is unknown when the church was finished, but it consisted of a summer barracks and a medical infirmary on location. The area was based on the far outskirts of Villmanstrand (Lappeenranta). After the Finnish Revolution, the church was kept but was nominated to be converted to a Lutheran church and opened to the public. However, by 1923 this decision was reversed and the building demolished instead.

== Commanders & Notable Soldiers ==
=== First Regiment ===
Regimental Chiefs

- 17 August 1806 – 12 October 1811, Field Adjutant Colonel (from 24 May 1807, Major General) Nikolai Mikhailovich Borozdin
- 28 October 1811 – 1 September 1814, Colonel (from 7 January 1813, Major General) Fyodor Ivanovich Drevich
- 22 September 1814 – 22 June 1815, Colonel Karl Ivanovich Gunderstrup

Commanding Officers

- 1 January 1807 – 21 December 1810, Lieutenant Colonel (Colonel from 12 December 1807) Evstafiy Willimovich Neauendorf
- 21 December 1810 – 22 July 1815, Lieutenant Colonel Fyodor Ivanovich Drevich
- 22 July 1815 – 22 January 1818, Colonel Karl Ivanovich Gunderstrup
- 22 January 1818 – 28 March 1823, Colonel Pavel Nikolaevich Rashanovich
- 28 March 1823 – 6 December 1827, Colonel Stanislav Karlovich, Baron von der Austen-Sacken
- 6 December 1827 – 30 April 1830, Colonel Fyodor Andreevich Fridericks
- 30 April 1830 – 2 February 1834, Colonel Mikhail Dmitrievich Dmitriev
- 2 February 1834 – 24 January 1839, Colonel Franz Ivanovich Zelensky
- 24 January 1839 – 16 May 1843, Field Adjutant Colonel Alexander Ivanovich Brevern
- 16 May 1843 – 6 December 1850, Colonel (Major General from 4 March 1849) Yakov Nikolaevich Kulnev
- 6 December 1850 – 20 July 1856, Colonel Andrey Yegorovich Ordin
- 20 July 1856 – 27 May 1860, Colonel Pyotr Alexandrovich Schepot'ev

=== Second & Third Regiments ===
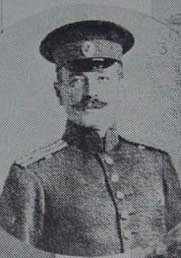
Colonel Georgy Ivanovich Shevich sometime before his appointment to commander of the Finnish Dragoons.

Later Major General and Chief of the General Staff (Finland), Hannes Ignatius was an officer in the regiment before the first disbandment. He resigned like many of his colleagues after learning about the impending disbandment.

Commanding officers of the regiment included:

- 5 June 1889 – 13 April 1901, Colonel Oskar Theodor Schauman
- 13 April 1901 – 17 May 1903, Colonel Alexander Antonovich Grigorkov
- 17 May 1903 – 12 May 1907, Colonel Alexander Vasilievich Sokolovsky
- 12 May 1907 – 4 September 1910, Colonel Sergei Petrovich Vannovsky
- 4 September 1910 – 15 April 1911, Field Adjutant Colonel Pavel Petrovich Skoropadsky
- 20 April 1911 – 24 December 1913, Colonel Georgy Ivanovich Shevich
- 7 January 1914 – 25 July 1914, Colonel Nikolai Nikolaevich Golovin
- 25 July 1914 – 13 March 1915, Colonel Alexander Evgenievich Krylov
- 27 March 1915 – 5 February 1917, Colonel (from 28 August 1916 Major General) Prince Nikolai Levanovich Melikov
- 12 February 1917 – 8 April 1917, Colonel Peter Viktorovich Engelhardt
- 14 April 1917 – 30 April 1917, Colonel Dmitry Pavlovich Reznikov
- 30 April 1917 – 21 June 1917, Colonel Vladimir Mikolaevich Gagarin
- 21 June 1917–unknown, Colonel Vladimir Vasilievich Rzhevsky
- unknown–1 March 1918, Colonel Sergey Nikolaevich Malygin
