= Sigrid Schauman =

Finnish artist and art critic (1877–1979)

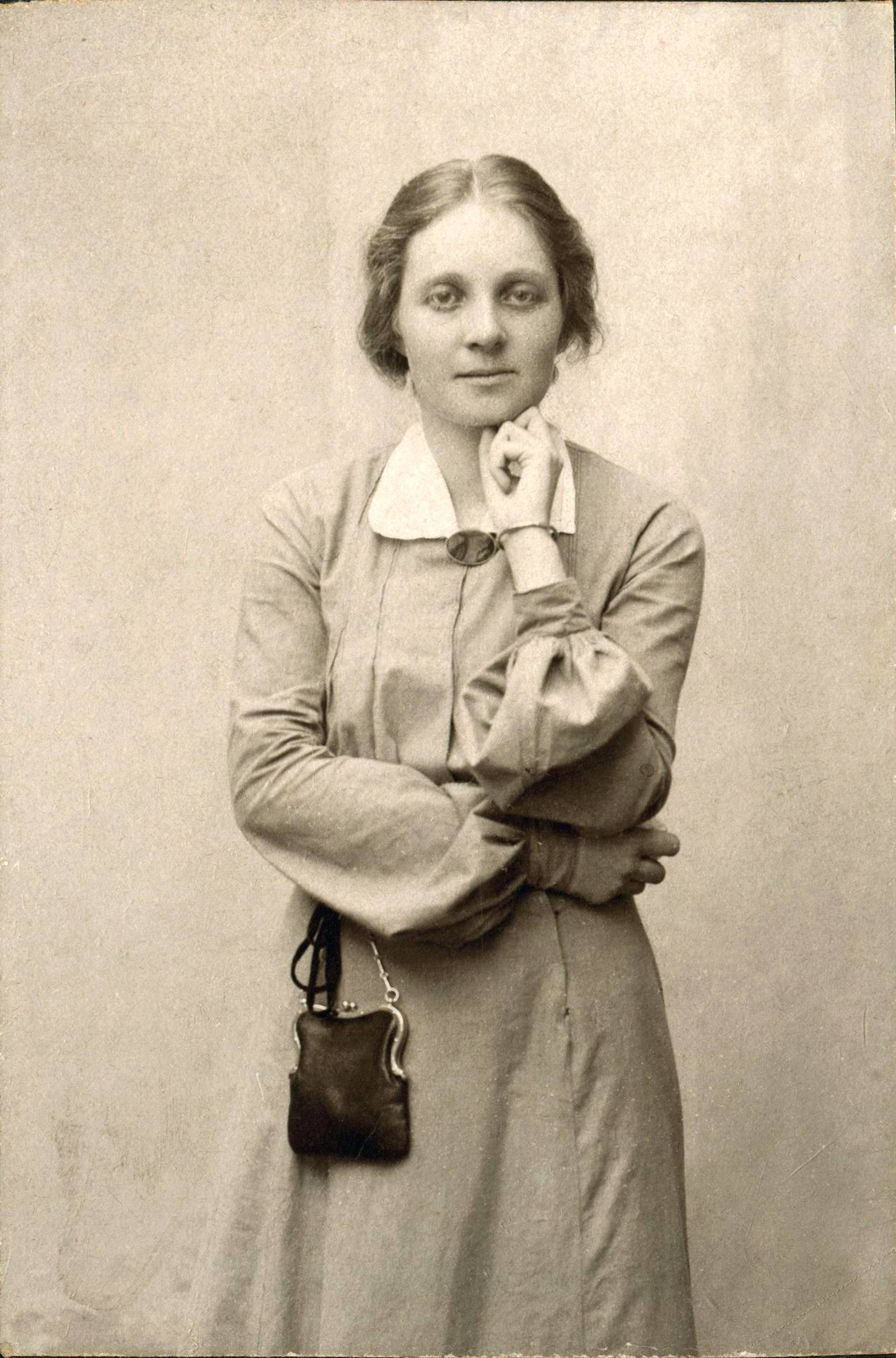
- Schauman in 1901
- Born: Sigrid Maria Schauman; 24 December 1877; Chuguyev, Kharkov Governorate, Russian Empire
- Died: 22 February 1979 (aged 101); Helsinki, Finland
- Known for: Painting, art criticism
- Movement: Prisma group
- Awards: Prince Eugen Medal; 1978

Sigrid Maria Schauman (24 December 1877 — 22 February 1979) was a Finnish artist and art critic.

== Biography ==
Sigrid Maria Schauman was born on 24 December 1877 at Chuguyev, in the Kharkov Governorate of the Russian Empire (present-day Ukraine), the daughter of general Fredrik Waldemar Schauman and Elin Maria Schauman. Her mother was the daughter of the Bishop of Porvoo, Finland. After living in Radom, Poland, the Schaumans returned to Finland in 1885 as the mother had died in 1884. In 1899 Sigrid began her studies in the Finnish Association of Arts Drawing School in Helsinki, where her teachers included Carl Jahn and Helene Schjerfbeck. She also visited the Önningeby artists' colony on Åland Islands, started by Victor Westerholm. In 1901 she participated for the first time in a group exhibition at the Ateneum.

In 1904 Schauman's brother, Eugen Schauman, murdered the Governor-General of Finland, Nikolai Bobrikov. After this she moved to Copenhagen, Denmark, and continued studying in Florence and in Paris, where she was at the Academie de la Palette in 1910 before travelling in Egypt.

She married Edvard Wolff, but he died shortly after the birth of their daughter Elisabeth in 1913.

In 1920 Schauman started work in the newspaper Dagens Press (from 1922 Svenska Pressen, from 1945 Nya Pressen) as an art critic, and worked for the newspaper for almost 30 years, publishing over 1500 art reviews, interviews and travel reports.

In 1939 she visited Rome and Paris.

After World War II, Schauman worked as a teacher in the Free School of Arts from 1945 to 1946. She retired in 1949, but continued painting on a grant provided by the City of Helsinki and an artist's pension from the State of Finland.

Schauman was awarded the Pro Finlandia medal in 1953, but later returned it to Urho Kekkonen in protest. During the 1950s she frequently travelled in France and Italy. She was a founding member of the Prisma group of artists in 1956.

Schauman's weakening eyesight prevented her from continuing to paint in the late 1960s. Even a year before her death, Schauman participated in a retrospective exhibition held in honour of her 100th birthday in the Amos Anderson Art Museum. In the same year in 1978, she was awarded the Prince Eugen Medal by the King of Sweden for her artistic contributions.

Sigrid Schauman published a biographical book Min bror Eugen: En gestalt ur Finlands frihetskamp ("My brother Eugen Schauman: A figure from Finland's fight for freedom") in 1964.
