= August Schauman =

Finnish publisher and politician (1826–1896)

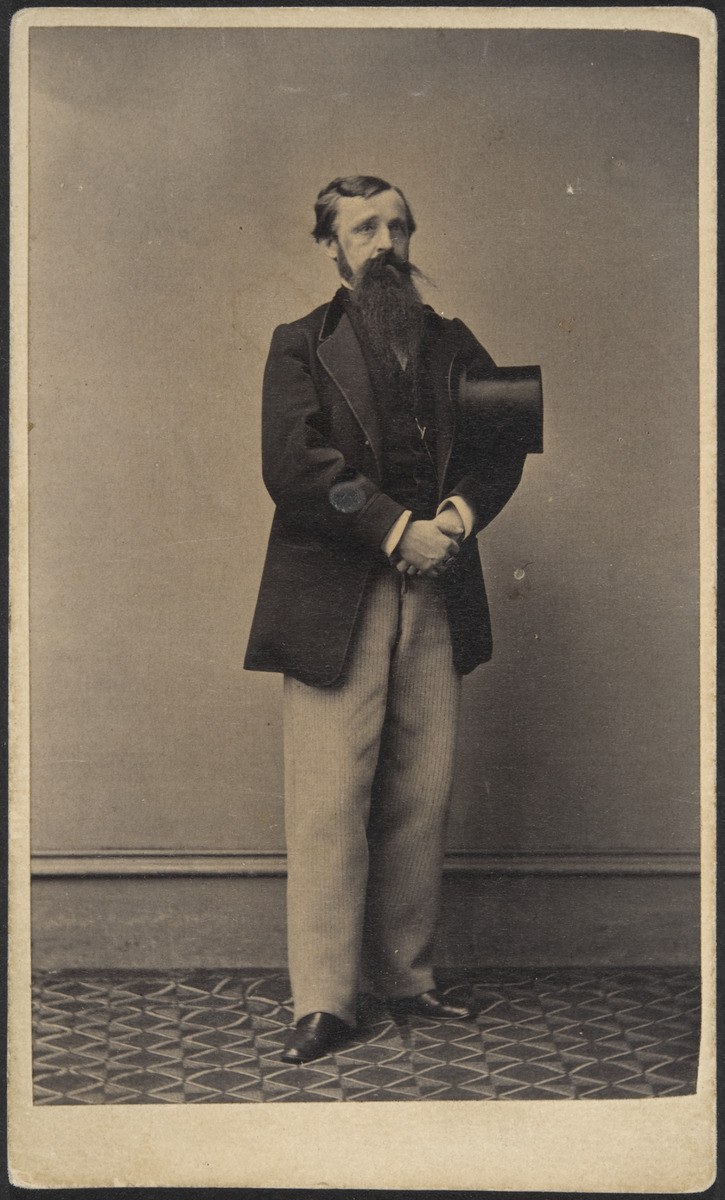
Schauman, c. 1865

Josef August Schauman (July 7, 1826, Helsinki – August 28, 1896, Helsinki Rural Municipality, now Vantaa) was a Finnish journalist, politician, and memoir writer. He is best known as the founder of the Swedish-language daily newspaper Hufvudstadsbladet. During his studies, Schauman became interested in Fennomania, and the language issue was a central theme in his career. He supported the improvement of the status of the Finnish language while defending the historical position of the Swedish language. Schauman supported the Liberal Party and participated in every parliament session from 1863 to 1894.

== Youth and studies ==
August Schauman belonged to the noble Schauman family. His father was Carl Schauman, a former officer in the Swedish army who was captured by the Russians during the surrender of Sveaborg (Viapori) and later served as a chamberlain in the Senate of autonomous Finland, receiving the title of chamber counselor. His mother was Johanna Lovisa Hoeckert. August Schauman's older brothers included theologian and Bishop of Porvoo Frans Ludvig Schauman, and Berndt Otto Schauman, known as an art expert.

Schauman graduated from high school in 1842 and became interested in the rising Fennomania movement during his studies. He studied the Finnish language during a trip to Savonia in the summer of 1845, where he also met leading Fennoman thinkers and Karelian epic singers. Schauman earned his Bachelor’s and Master’s degrees in philosophy in 1850. He worked as the financial manager of the Finnish Literature Society from 1851 to 1856 and as the editor of Helsingfors Morgonblad from 1853 to 1855. In 1851, he traveled to Denmark and, from 1856 to 1858, visited the leading cultural countries of Central and Western Europe.

== Career ==
The language issue became the dominant theme of Schauman's career. He considered it important to defend the historical position of the Swedish language, even though he supported improving the status of the Finnish language. In 1858, he founded his first newspaper, Papperslykta, a weekly publication offering light reading material. Schauman skillfully circumvented the censorship that had caused difficulties, and the newspaper succeeded. At this point, he began to distance himself from the more radical Fennoman supporters of the language issue and became embroiled in disputes with J. V. Snellman, who began advocating for the rejection of Swedishness in Finland in his Morgonbladet. Schauman and Snellman engaged in a lengthy dispute over the language issue in their newspapers in 1859. A few years later, they also clashed over issues related to Finland's relations with Russia.

Schauman left Papperslykta in 1860 and worked as an editor for Helsingfors Tidningar from 1861 to 1863, following Zachris Topelius. Due to new disputes with Snellman, Schauman resigned from the newspaper within a year of joining but returned shortly after at the request of the readers. In 1864, he founded Hufvudstadsbladet, where he served as publisher and editor until 1885. Schauman also owned the printing house Centraltryckeriet, which he established for the newspaper. The goal of Hufvudstadsbladet was commercial success and to become the leading newspaper in the capital. It became Finland's first financially profitable newspaper during an era dominated by political publications. Although Hufvudstadsbladet was officially neutral, it supported the liberal cause. Today, it is Finland's largest Swedish-language newspaper.

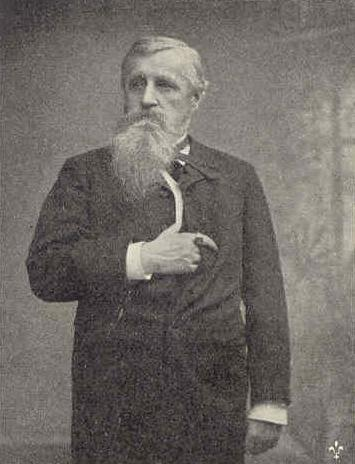

Schauman was a supporter of the Liberal Party in politics. He participated in the Estates of the Realm at the Finnish Parliament from 1863–1864, 1867, 1872, 1877–1878, 1882, 1885, 1888, 1891, and 1894. He was also a member of the Helsinki City Council from 1875 to 1888. Additionally, Schauman served as the chairman of the Finnish Association for the Pensions of Artists and Writers from 1875 to 1893 and the Finnish Tourist Association from 1887 to 1890. In 1885, he was one of the founding members of the Finno-Ugric Society.

Schauman published his extensive cultural-historical memoirs, Från sex årtionden i Finland: upptecknade lefnadsminnen (From Six Decades in Finland: Recorded Memories), in two volumes in 1892–1893. In this major work, he thoughtfully described his observations on people, events, as well as the development of the arts, ideas, and way of life from the 1830s to the 1860s. A new, annotated edition of the memoirs was published in 1922. The work has been translated into Finnish twice, in 1901 and 1924. Another significant work by Schauman is the six-part pamphlet series Nu och förr (Now and Before), published in 1886, which portrayed the changes in the lifestyle of Helsinki residents and the city's development. Schauman also proposed the publication of H. G. Porthan's collected works and participated in their editing together with Sven G. Elmgren from 1859 to 1862.

== Publications ==
- Kuuden vuosikymmenen ajoilta: Muistelmia Suomesta 1–2. (Förr och nu I–II, 1892–1893). Translated by Santeri Ingman. Helsinki: G. W. Edlund, 1901.
- Kuudelta vuosikymmeneltä Suomessa: Muistoja elämän varrelta I–II. (Förr och nu I–II, 1892–1893). Translated by Viki Kärkkäinen. Jyväskylä: K. J. Gummerus, 1924.
- Kuudelta vuosikymmeneltä: Muistoja elämän varrelta 1–2. (Förr och nu I–II, 1892–1893). Translated by Viki Kärkkäinen. Translation revised by Panu Pekkanen. Helsinki: WSOY, 1967.

== Literature ==
- Grandell, Jens (2020). Från ett årtionde i Finland: August Schauman, republikanism och liberalism 1855–1865. Helsingfors universitet. ISBN 978-951-653-448-3.

Preceded by —	Hufvudstadsbladetin päätoimittaja 1864–1885	Succeeded by Arthur Frenckell
