= Glupovskoye =

Glupovskoye Глуповское
- Village
- Location within Vologda Oblast Location within Russia
- Coordinates: 59°06′N 38°40′E
- Country: Russia
- Region: Vologda Oblast
- District: Sheksninsky District
- Time zone: UTC+3:00

Glupovskoye (Russian: Глуповское) is a rural locality (a village) in Ugolskoye Rural Settlement, Sheksninsky District, Vologda Oblast, Russia. The population was 7 as of 2002.

== Geography ==
Glupovskoye is located 20 km (12 mi) southeast of Sheksna (the district's administrative centre) by road. Leonovo is the nearest rural locality.
