= Berndt Otto Schauman =

Finnish art enthusiast and publicist (1821–1895)

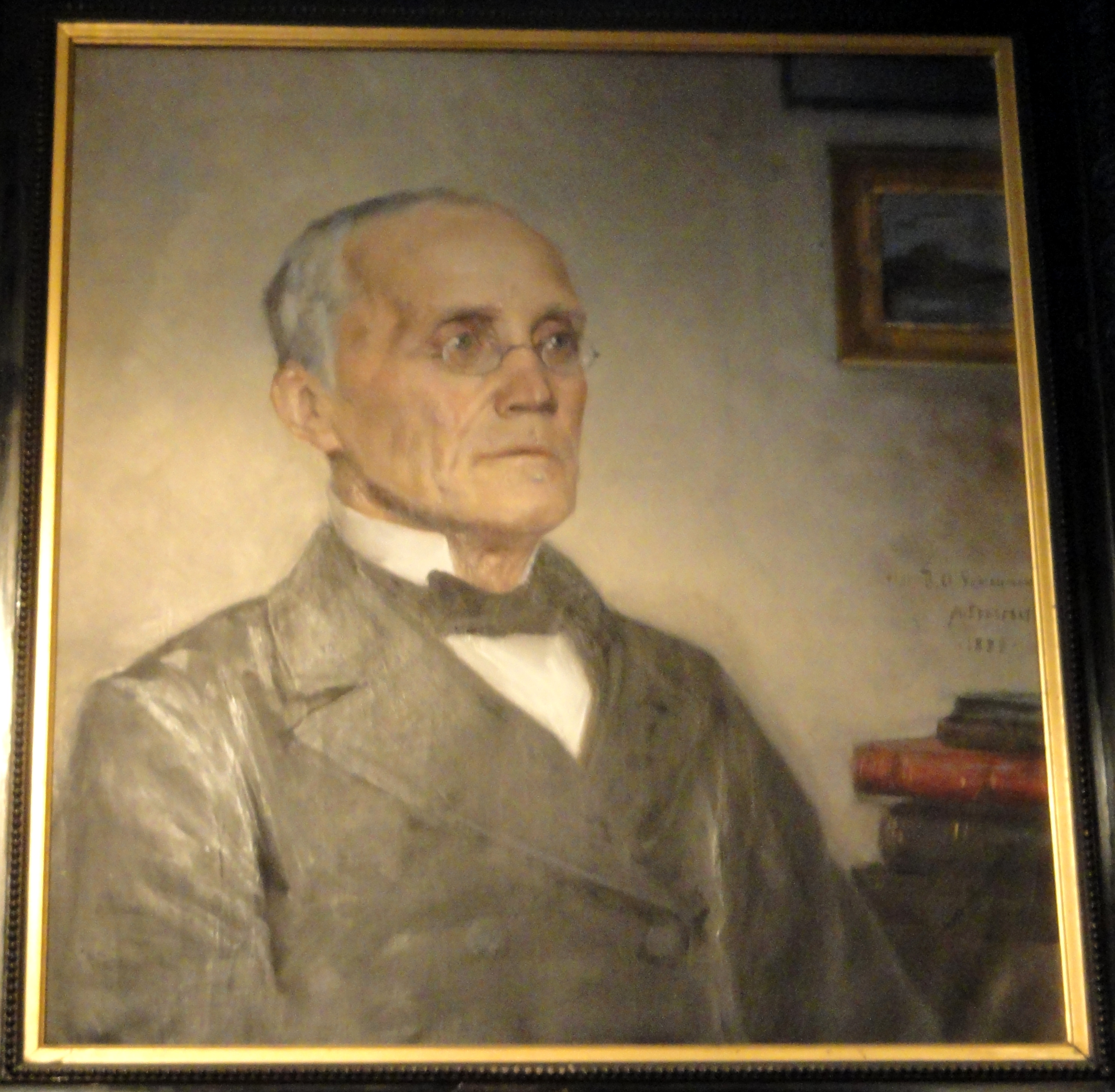
Portrait of Schauman by Albert Edelfelt (1883)

Berndt Otto Schauman (17 May 1821 in Helsinki – 28 March 1895) was a Finnish publicist, art enthusiast, and a significant cultural figure. He was a member of the noble Schauman family and the brother of theologian and bishop Frans Ludvig Schauman and journalist August Schauman. His parents were Senate chamber councilor Carl Schauman and Johanna Lovisa Hoeckert.

Schauman became a student in 1837, studying in Helsinki and at Uppsala University from 1842 to 1843, but did not complete a degree. He worked as an amanuensis at the University of Helsinki Library from 1849 to 1867. During the 1850s, he edited MA Castrén's two-part travel memoirs and published a book about GA Wallin's travels, as well as other non-fiction works.

Schauman became a member of the Finnish Art Society when it was established in 1846 and expanded his knowledge of European art during a lengthy trip abroad in 1857–1858. From 1862 to 1865, he published Finland's first art album, Photographs of Finnish Painters' Tables, along with a brief text in three parts (I–III).

In 1868, Schauman was elected to the board of the Finnish Art Society, collaborating with Carl Albert Edelfelt, Fredrik Cygnaeus, Zacharias Topelius, and Carl Gustaf Estlander. He served as curator for the society's collections from 1869 to 1887 and for the Cygnaeus Gallery from 1885 to 1895. Schauman organized exhibitions from the society's collections and wrote extensively on Finnish art and artists. He resigned after the completion of the Ateneum Art Museum.

Schauman was also active in politics as a member of the knighthood and nobility in the Estates Parliament, where he participated in several state assemblies in 1863–1864, 1867, 1872, 1877–1878, 1882, 1885, 1888, 1891, and 1894. He often spoke out on art issues and worked to highlight the importance of art in Finnish society.

Schauman's contributions to Finnish art and culture, along with his involvement in political and public affairs, make him one of the most significant cultural figures in Finland during the 19th century.
