= Frans Ludvig Schauman =

Bishop of Porvoo

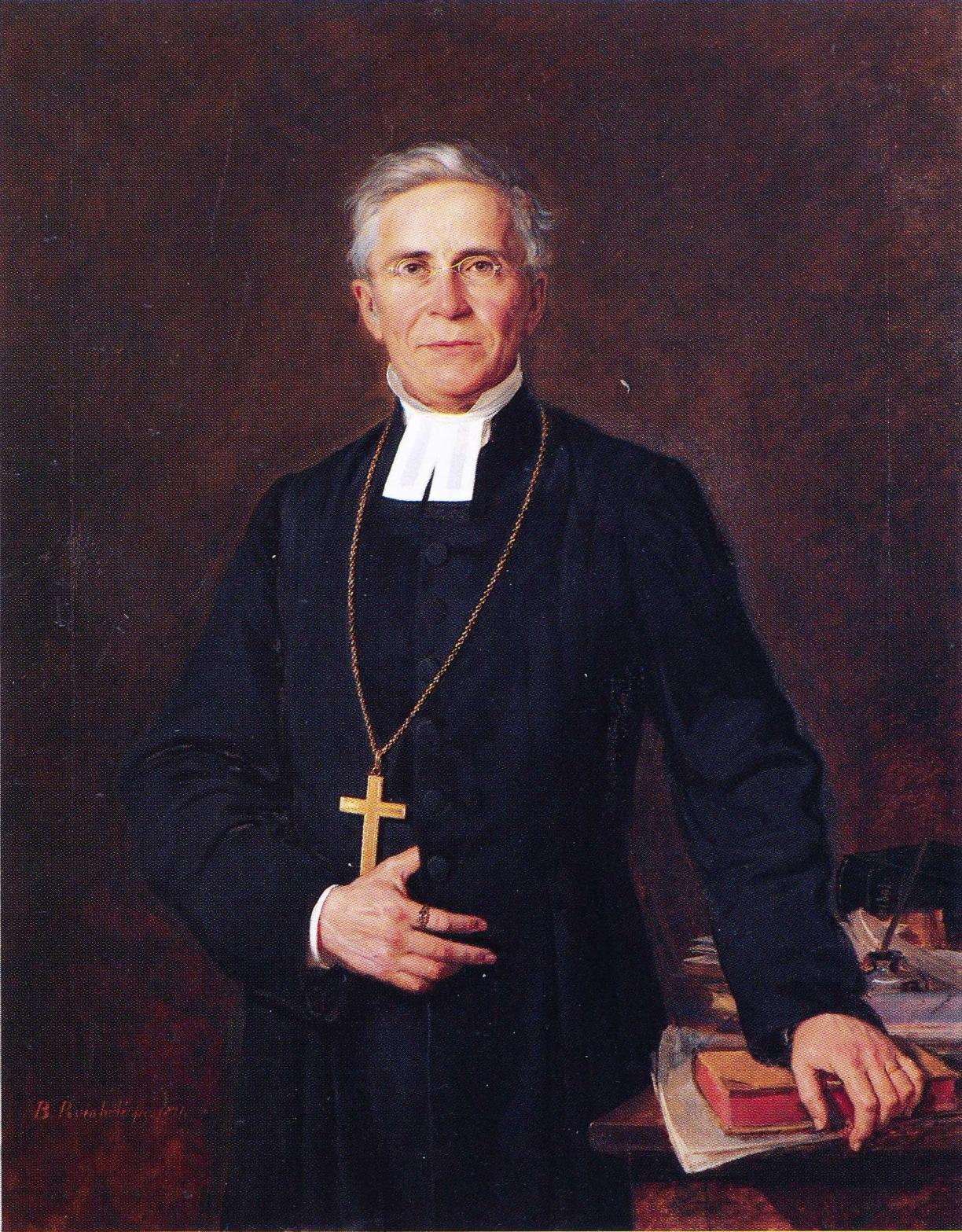
Frans Ludvig Schauman

Frans Ludvig Schauman (24 September 1810, Maaria – 28 June 1877, Porvoo) was a Finnish theologian, member of parliament and member of the Schauman noble family. He was the great-grandson of Henrik Johan Schauman, brother of Berndt Otto and August Schauman, and father of Fridolf Schauman.

Schauman became a student in 1827, a candidate of philosophy in 1831, a master of philosophy in 1832, a candidate of theology in 1834, a licentiate of theology in 1836, an adjunct in theology in 1838, and a doctor of theology in 1840. After publishing his thesis De constitutione regiminis ecclesiastici, singulari Fennice ratione habita, he served as a professor of practical theology from 1847 to 1865 and as the dean of the theological faculty from 1853 to 1865.

In addition to minor essays, Schauman published Handbook of Church Law in Finland (Vol. I, 1853) and edited the Journal for the Finnish Church (1858–1859). His skills were also called upon for practical tasks. He was appointed a member of the church law committee in 1852 and served on committees for reorganizing secondary schools (1855), regulating local government administration in the country (1859), and reviewing the proposal for the national elementary school system (1861–1862).

On September 20, 1856, Schauman was appointed to speak at a university celebration marking the coronation of Alexander II. He expressed the hopes for rapid progress in various directions that had arisen among the Finnish public at the time, in words that were received with great approval in the country. Most notably, he advocated for the calling of a parliament.

Schauman was one of the leading figures working for the restoration of the constitutional state system in Finland. He was elected a member of the so-called January Committee in 1862 and a representative in the clergy estate at the parliament in 1863–1864. In 1865, he became the bishop of Porvoo, which made him a natural representative at the parliaments of 1867 and 1872.

Through both his eloquence and his expertise in constitutional and church law, Schauman wielded significant influence within his estate. While firmly upholding the teachings of the church, he was tolerant toward other faiths and deeply committed to the principle of religious freedom. From this standpoint, he worked for a new church law for Finland and the separation of schools from the church.

A proposal for church law for the Grand Duchy of Finland (Förslag till kyrkolag för storfurstendömet Finland, 1863), drafted by Schauman as a member of the church law committee, served as the basis for the Church Law of 1869, although not all of his liberal views were fully implemented. He also published articles on constitutional and political issues in newspapers, which, along with several of his speeches, were compiled under the title Speeches and Essays on Constitutional Matters in Finland (1876).

As bishop of the Diocese of Porvoo, Schauman worked diligently to promote seriousness and devotion to duty among the clergy. He continued his theological work, the results of which appeared in Sanningsvittnet. Theological and Ecclesiastical Monthly Journal (1869–1873) and in an unfinished work on Practical Theology (1874–1877).

== Sources ==
- "Frans Ludvig Schauman". Biografiskt lexikon för Finland (in Swedish). Helsingfors: Svenska litteratursällskapet i Finland. urn:NBN:fi:sls-4817-1416928957423.
- https://uppslagsverket.fi/sv/view-170045-SchaumanFransLudvig
- https://kansallisbiografia.fi/kansallisbiografia/henkilo/3620
- Schauman, 1. Frans Ludvig i Nordisk familjebok (andra upplagan, 1916)
