= Nikolay Bobrikov =

Governor-General of Finland from 1898 to 1904

- Николай Бобриков
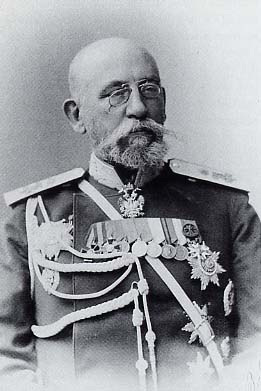
- Bobrikov in c. 1900

Governor-General of Finland
- In office 29 August [O.S. 17 August] 1898 – 17 June [O.S. 4 June] 1904
- Monarch: Nicholas II
- Preceded by: Frederick Heiden
- Succeeded by: Ivan Obolensky

Personal details
- Born: 27 January [O.S. 15 January] 1839 Strelna, Petergof, Russia
- Died: 17 June [O.S. 4 June] 1904 (aged 65) Helsinki, Grand Duchy of Finland, Russian Empire
- Resting place: Trinity Lavra of St. Sergius

Military service
- Allegiance: Russia
- Branch/service: Russian Imperial Army
- Years of service: 1858 – 1904
- Rank: General of the Infantry
- Commands: Finnish Military District
- Battles/wars: Russo-Turkish War
- Awards: See below

Nikolay Ivanovich Bobrikov (Russian: Николай Иванович Бобриков; 27 January [O.S. 15 January] 1839 – 17 June [O.S. 4 June] 1904) was a Russian general and politician. He served as Governor-General of Finland and the Finnish Military District from 29 August [O.S. 17 August] 1898 until his death, during the early reign of Emperor Nicholas II, and was responsible for promoting Russification policies in Finland. After his appointment as governor-general, he quickly became very unpopular and was assassinated by Eugen Schauman, a Finnish nationalist born in Kharkov.

== Biography ==
=== Early life ===
Bobrikov's father, Ivan Vasileyvich Bobrikov (1798–1883), was a military physician who had risen to the status of a member of the scientific council of the military medical board. His mother was the Baltic German Alexandra Seeland.

Nikolay Ivanovich Bobrikov was born on January 15, 1839 in the village of Strelna near Saint Petersburg and attended the 1st Cadet Corps. Upon graduation, he became a lieutenant and served in the Russian Imperial Guard. After which he served in the Kazan Military District and as divisional chief-of-staff in Novgorod. He became a colonel in 1869. A year later he was transferred to Saint Petersburg for special duties in the imperial guard. This gave Bobrikov access to the imperial court. In 1878 he became a major general.

Bobrikov was married in Kazan in 1867 to Olga Petrovna Leontyeva. The couple had five children. After Olga's death in 1895 Bobrikov was married again to Elizabeth (Yelizaveta Ivanovna) Staël von Holstein, the daughter of a general. The couple had a daughter. Bobrikov's only surviving son Nikolay Nikolayevich Bobrikov (1882–1956) followed in his father's footsteps and was promoted to colonel. One of Bobrikov's sons-in-law was the Norwegian-born Finnish officer Johannes Holmsen, who was later promoted to lieutenant general. Bobrikov was an energetic and capable man whose views were strongly Russian nationalistic.

Bobrikov's daughter Lionbow Bobrikoff-Holmsen (1880–1939) was a lady-in-waiting at the imperial court in Saint Petersburg. She married the Norwegian-born general of the Russian army Johannes Holmsen. In the early days of World War I, Holmsen was captured by the Germans but later got to live in Norway, where he died after the Russian Revolution. His spouse escaped over the border to Sweden with her children after the revolution. They later lived as refugees in London, Berlin and Paris. Lionbow Bobrikoff-Holmsen died in Paris on 23 January 1939.

=== Military career ===
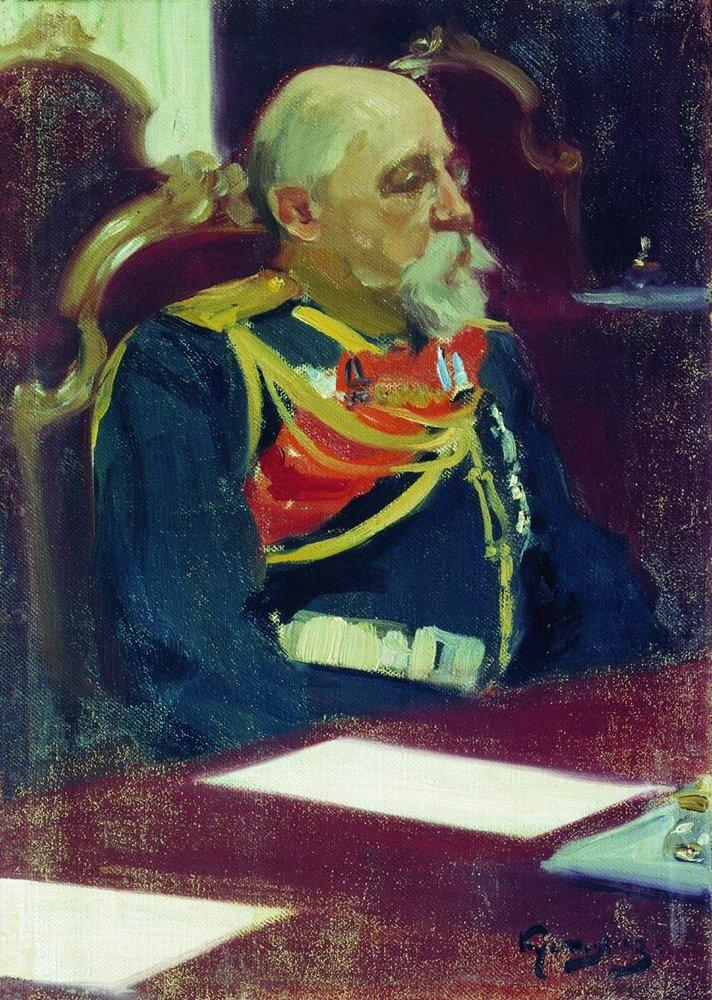
Boris Kustodiev, Nikolay Bobrikov, 1902–1903

Nikolay Bobrikov was promoted to an officer after finishing cadet school in 1858. He later got a degree at the Nikolay general staff academy, after which he was appointed to the general staff of the Kazan military district. From 1867 he served as the chief of staff at the 22nd infantry division in Novgorod. In 1869 he was promoted to colonel. In 1876 he was sent to Bucharest, Romania as the Russian military official and in 1878 he was promoted to major general during the Russo-Turkish War.

in 1889, Emperor Alexander II of Russia appointed Bobrikov as a member of the special committee (Verhovnaya Rasporyaditelnaya Komissiya) led by Mikhail Loris-Melikov. The mission of the committee was to fight against the revolutionaries. Bobrikov was actively involved in investigating the bomb strike held at the Winter Palace in 1880. In 1884 he was promoted to lieutenant general and he became the chief of staff of the guard and of the Saint Petersburg military district. He was promoted to general of the infantry in 1897.

=== Governor-General of Finland ===
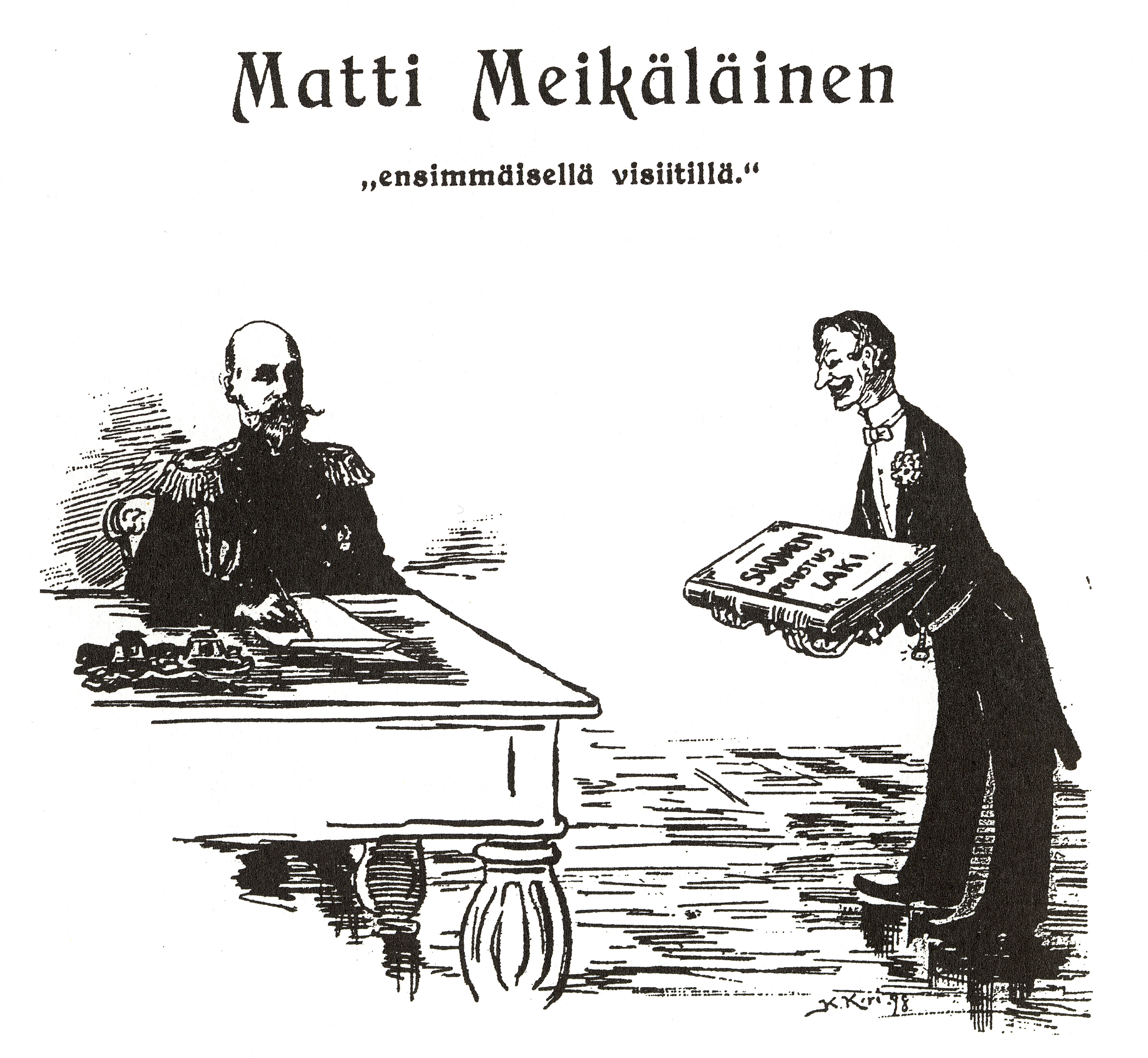
A cartoon by Kaarlo Kari on 30 September 1898 in the magazine Matti Meikäläinen, showing Bobrikov at the start of his term as Governor-General of Finland, being given the Constitution of Finland to read.

In 1898, Emperor Nicholas II appointed Bobrikov as Governor-General of Finland as well as the Finnish Military District.

Upon appointment, he introduced a Russification programme into the Grand Duchy of Finland, the 11 main points were:

- Unification of the Finnish army.
- Restricting the power of the Minister–Secretary of State.
- Introducing of a special programme for dealing with cases common to the empire and the grand duchy.
- Adoption of the Russian language as the official language of the Senate, education and administration.
- Bringing the University of Helsinki and secondary schools under tighter control of the Russian authorities.
- Allowing Russian citizens to hold offices in Finland.
- Discontinuation of the Finnish markka.
- Removal of the customs border between Finland and Russia, as well as merging the Finnish Customs into that of Russia.
- Introduction of Russian newspapers into Finland to spread the official viewpoint of the Russian government.
- Redesign of the festive celebrations of the Diet of Finland.
- Redesign of the directive of the Governor-General of Finland.

Bobrikov quickly became very unpopular and hated in Finland as he was an adamant supporter of the curtailing of the grand duchy's extensive autonomy, which had in the late 1800s come into conflict with Russian ambitions of a unified and indivisible Russian state. In 1899, Nicholas II signed the "February Manifesto" which marked the beginning of the first "Years of Oppression" (sortovuodet) from the traditional Finnish perspective. In this manifesto, the Emperor decreed that the Diet of the Estates of Finland could be overruled in legislation if it was in Russian imperial interest. Half a million Finns, considering the decree a coup against the Finnish constitution, signed a petition to Nicholas II, requesting to revoke the manifesto. The Emperor did not even receive the delegation bringing the petition.

In 1900, Bobrikov issued orders that all correspondence between government offices was to be conducted in Russian and that education in the Russian language was to be increased in schools. The Finnish army was abolished in 1901, and Finnish conscripts could now be forced to serve with Russian troops anywhere in the Russian empire. To the first call-up in 1902, only 42% of the conscripts showed up. In 1905, conscription in Finland was abolished since Finns were seen as unreliable. In 1903, Bobrikov was given dictatorial powers by the Emperor so that he could dismiss government officials and close newspapers.

=== Interview on 1 March 1899 ===
Journalist Valfrid Spångberg of the Swedish newspaper Aftonbladet visited Bobrikov on 1 March 1899 to ask a few questions about the February Manifesto.

Spångberg: "How does Your Highness find the Finns and conditions in Finland, better or worse than what you had expected?"

Bobrikov: "Neither. The view I had had earlier about this has generally strengthened. The internal order in Finland is excellent, and the Finns are a lawful and patriotic people, which I greatly respect, as I do the Senate and the Estates. But their point of view and mine differ in many parts. As soon as they come to realise that the Russian government means the best for them I will be convinced we will get along perfectly."

Spångberg: "How does the Finnish press do its duty?"

Bobrikov: "Not to my full satisfaction. I am a friend of the press, but the Finnish newspapers are accustomed to a way of speaking that I cannot accept, and they present views which I feel cannot do anything else than spread discomfort and cause damage. It is not the place of the press to comment negatively on the actions of the highest authorities."

== Bobrikov and the February Manifesto ==
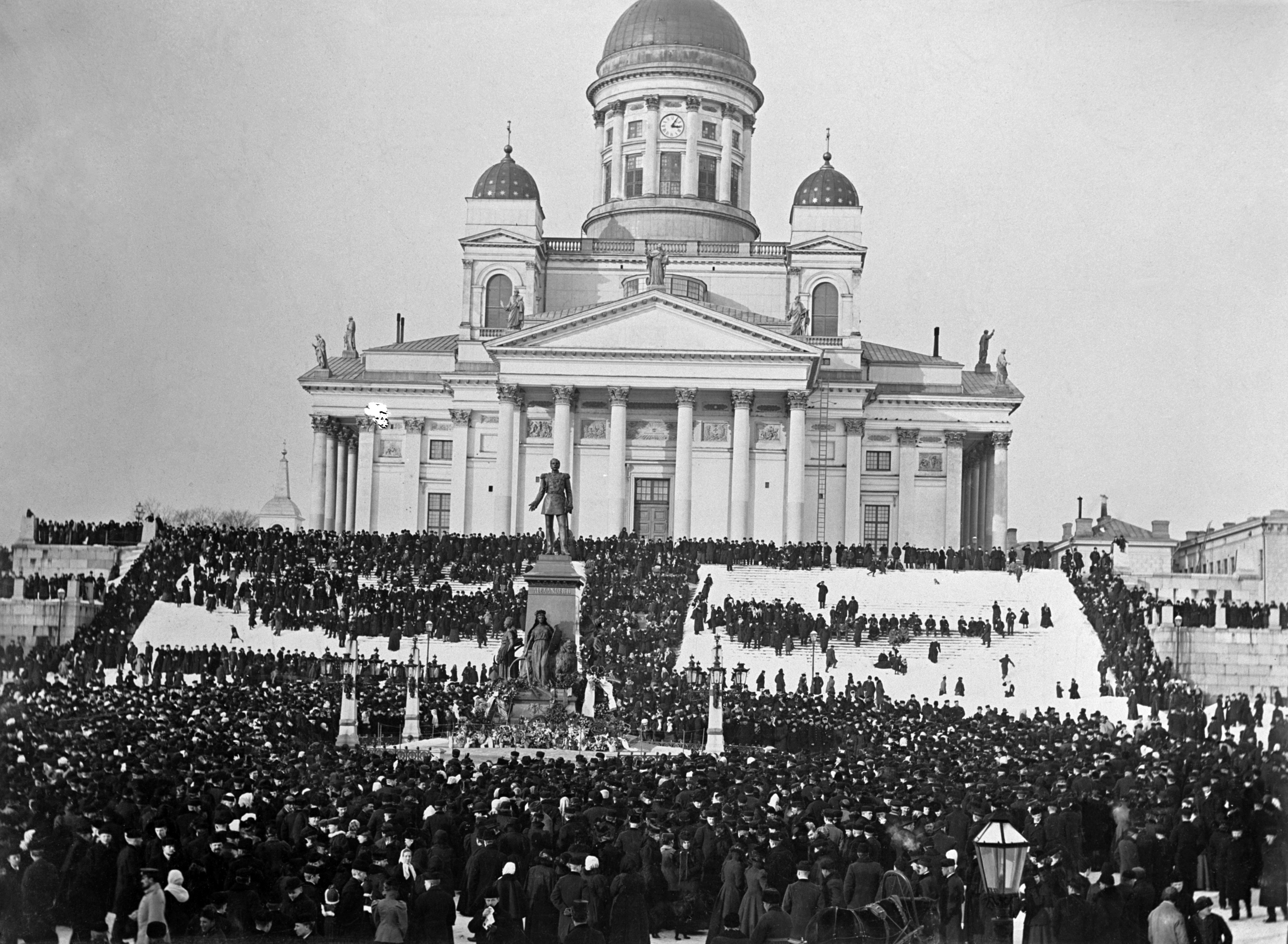
A protest against the February Manifesto at the Senate Square in Helsinki on 13 March 1899.

Bobrikov was involved in creating the February Manifesto, which became a cornerstone for systematic Russification of Finland. Because of this, the Finns gathered the Great Petition bearing the names of half a million Finns. The petition took Bobrikov by complete surprise and he was angry that such an act had been undertaken, he viewed the entire petition as illegal. After the publication of the manifesto Bobrikov said: "All people in Finland who are capable of thinking are satisfied with the Emperor's manifesto." To support his opinions in Finland, in 1900 Bobrikov founded the Russian-language newspaper Finlandskaya Gazeta funded with government support, whose early issues were also published in Finnish under the name Suomen Sanomat.

== Russian peddlers and rumours of land redistribution ==
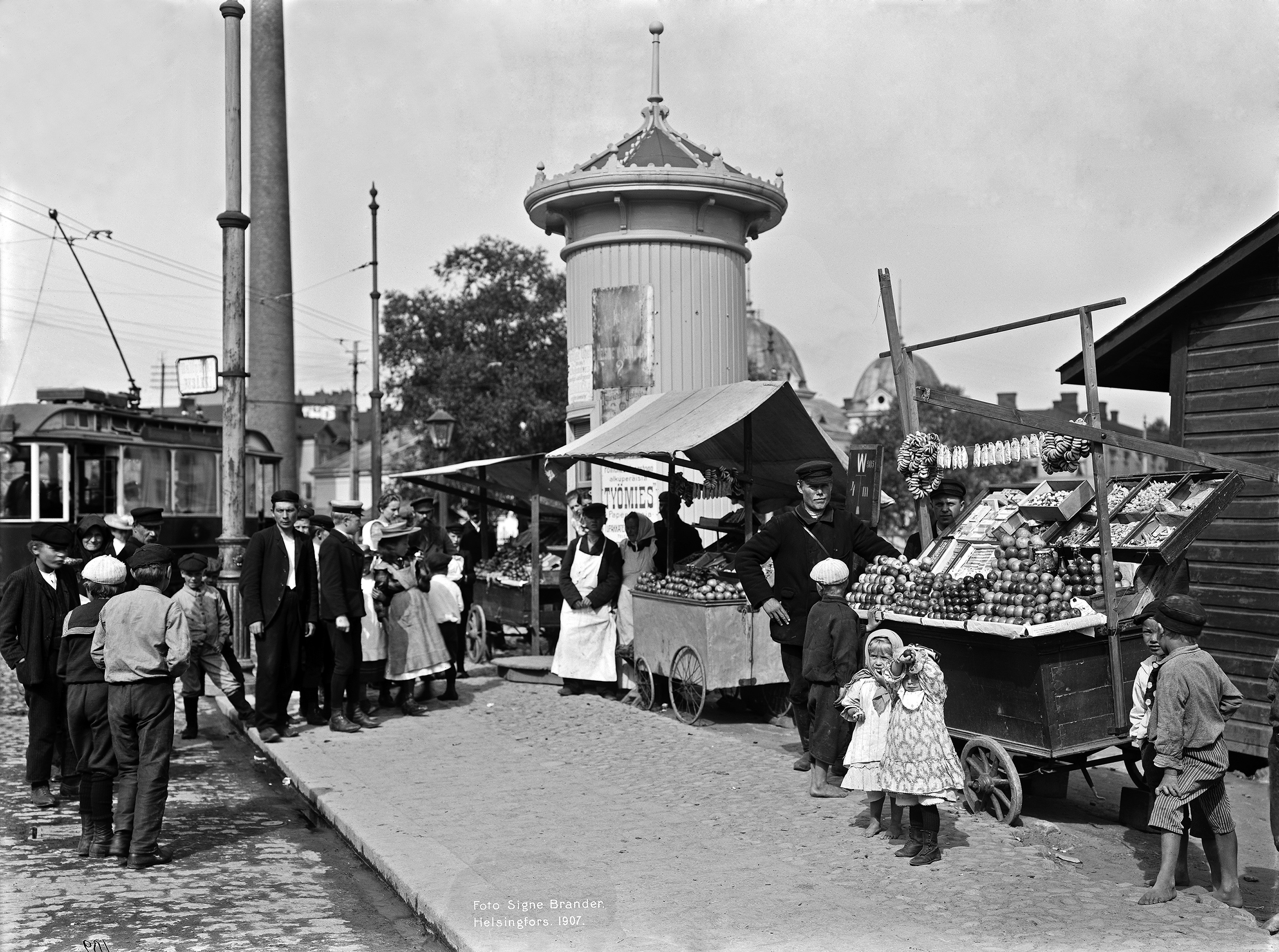
Russian fruit merchants at the Hakaniemi Market Square in Helsinki in 1907.

As Governor-General of Finland, Bobrikov sought to get the landless people and the poor in Finland on his side. However, the Finns did not trust Bobrikov's promises, but instead thought it was a plot. About 1000 to 2000 "laukkuryssäs" ("bag Russians"), meaning peddlers from White Karelia, circulated the country, spreading rumours of how excellently Russia had handled things for the landless people and for the farmers. They said that land redistribution for free would begin soon. These rumours started appearing more and more often since February 1899. To combat this, the labour movement, youth societies and students such as Eugen Schauman started educating people about what the circumstances in Russia were really like. The Porvoo-based newspaper Uusimaa claimed that the rumours had originated from the Moskovskiye Vedomosti secret Finnish correspondent P. I. Messarosch. In 1897 he had published a book, according to which Finland should be assimilated into the Russian Empire, and he acted as an informant to Bobrikov. Messarosch left Finland in spring 1900.

The Swedish journalist Valfrid Spångberg said that the Russians had sent agents into the midst of the landless people in Finland, such as they had already done to other states around the Baltic Sea, when they had tried to coax people into converting to the Orthodox faith. The jurist professor Wilhelm Chydenius wrote that Bobrikov was responsible for spreading the rumours. The Finlandskya Gazeta claimed in 1900 that only the Russian officials were true friends of the Finnish peasants. According to Senator Gripenberg, the agitation done by the Russian peddlers was an act of purposeful spreading of distrust between the different social classes in Finland. In Finland people generally did not trust the Russian peddlers, except possibly in the countryside. By Bobrikov's initiative, a law was passed on 2 July 1900 making the Russian peddler trade legal.

== Assassination ==
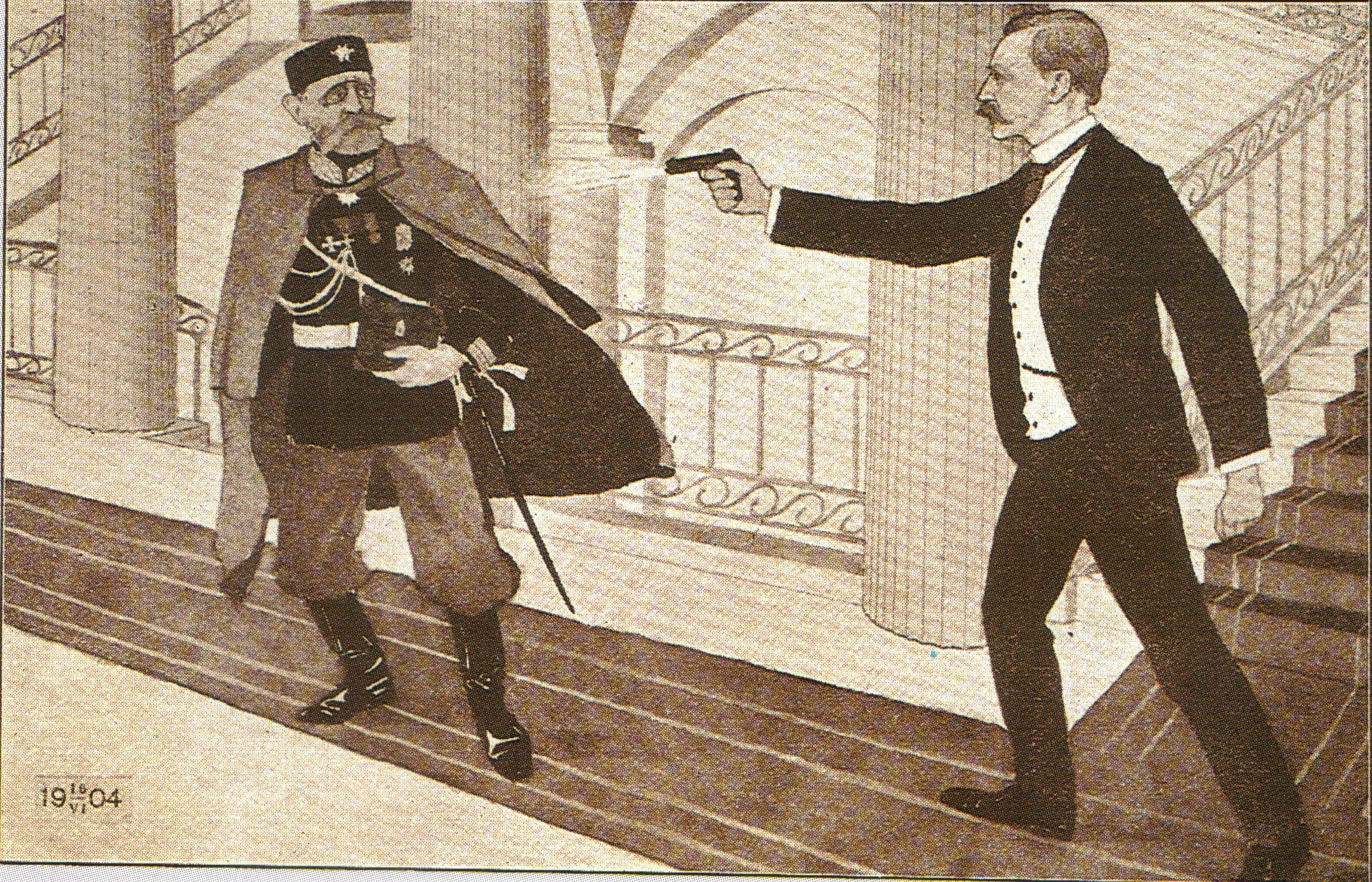
A drawing of the assassination by an unknown artist

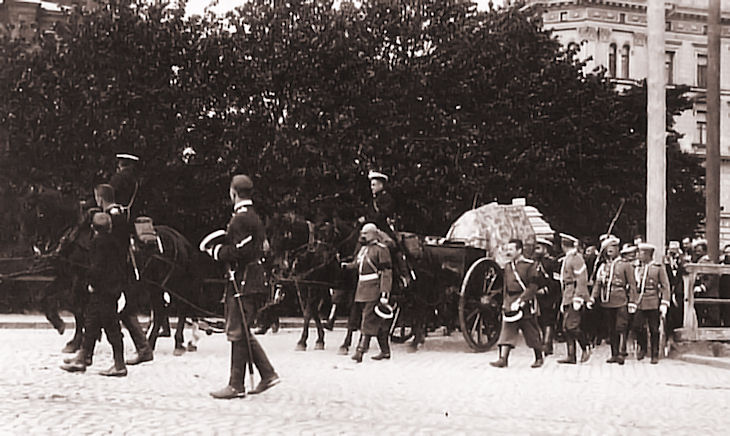
Governor-general Nikolay Bobrikov's casket at the Eastern Orthodox Uspenski Cathedral in Helsinki, before being transported to St. Petersburg

On June 16, 1904, Bobrikov was assassinated by Eugen Schauman in Helsinki. Schauman shot Bobrikov three times and then himself twice. Schauman died instantly, while Bobrikov, mortally wounded, died at the hospital in the early hours of the following morning.

== Honours and awards ==
=== Domestic ===
- Order of St. Anna, 3rd class (14.4.1865)
- Order of St. Stanislaus, 2nd class
- Order of St. Anna, 2nd class with Imperial Crown (17.11.1869, Imperial Crown on 30.8.1873)
- Order of St. Vladimir, 4th class (30.8.1871)
- Order of St. Vladimir, 3rd class (30.8.1875)
- Order of St. Stanislaus, 1st class (30.8.1878)
- Order of St. Anna, 1st class (30.8.1880)
- Order of St. Vladimir, 2nd class (15.5.1883)
- Order of the White Eagle (30.8.1887)
- Order of St. Alexander Nevsky with diamonds signs (30.8.1891, diamond sign on 14.5.1896)
- Order of St. Vladimir, 1st class (1.1.1902)

== Sources ==
- "Бобриков, Николай Иванович" . Brockhaus and Efron Encyclopedic Dictionary (in Russian). 1906.

Political offices
Preceded by Frederick Heiden	Governor-General of Finland; 1898–1904	Succeeded by Ivan Mikhailovich Obolensky
