= 1905 =

1905 in various calendars
- Gregorian calendar: 1905; MCMV
- Ab urbe condita: 2658
- Armenian calendar: 1354; ԹՎ ՌՅԾԴ
- Assyrian calendar: 6655
- Baháʼí calendar: 61–62
- Balinese saka calendar: 1826–1827
- Bengali calendar: 1311–1312
- Berber calendar: 2855
- British Regnal year: 4 Edw. 7 – 5 Edw. 7
- Buddhist calendar: 2449
- Burmese calendar: 1267
- Byzantine calendar: 7413–7414
- Chinese calendar: 甲辰年 (Wood Dragon); 4602 or 4395 — to — 乙巳年 (Wood Snake); 4603 or 4396
- Coptic calendar: 1621–1622
- Discordian calendar: 3071
- Ethiopian calendar: 1897–1898
- Hebrew calendar: 5665–5666
- Hindu calendars
- Vikram Samvat: 1961–1962
- Shaka Samvat: 1826–1827
- Kali Yuga: 5005–5006
- Holocene calendar: 11905
- Igbo calendar: 905–906
- Iranian calendar: 1283–1284
- Islamic calendar: 1322–1323
- Japanese calendar: Meiji 38 (明治３８年)
- Javanese calendar: 1834–1835
- Julian calendar: Gregorian minus 13 days
- Korean calendar: 4238
- Minguo calendar: 7 before ROC 民前7年
- Nanakshahi calendar: 437
- Thai solar calendar: 2447–2448
- Tibetan calendar: ཤིང་ཕོ་འབྲུག་ལོ་ (male Wood-Dragon); 2031 or 1650 or 878 — to — ཤིང་མོ་སྦྲུལ་ལོ་ (female Wood-Snake); 2032 or 1651 or 879

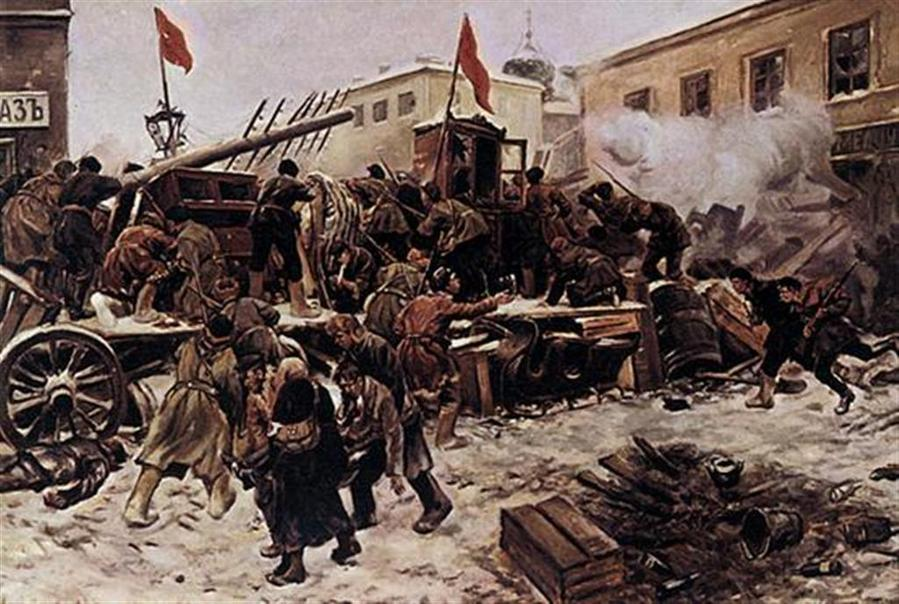
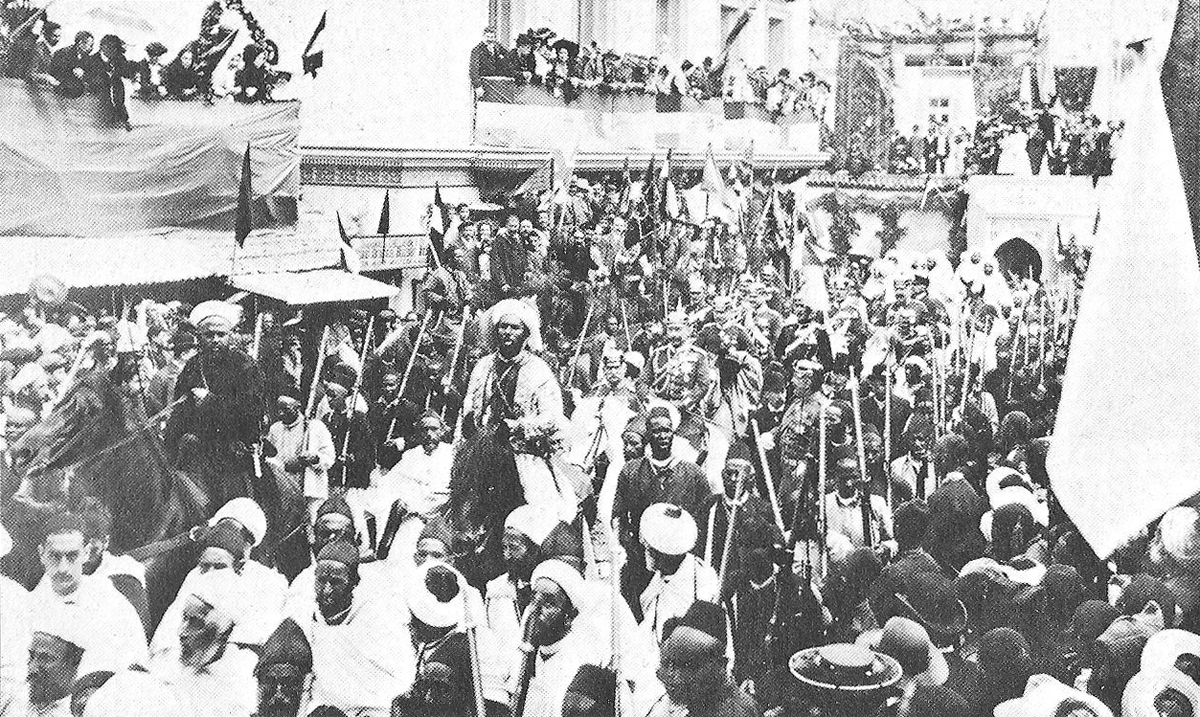
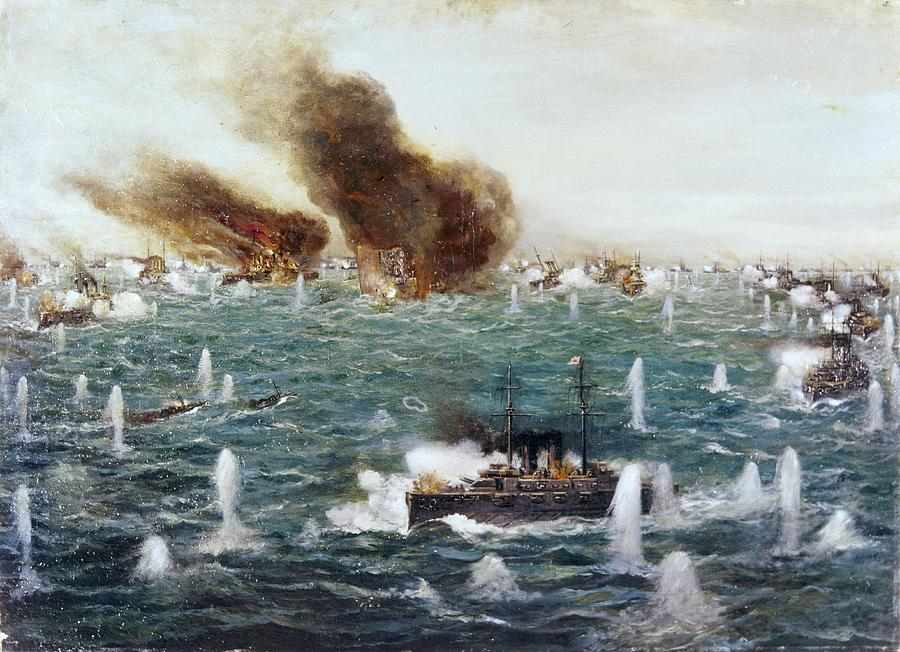
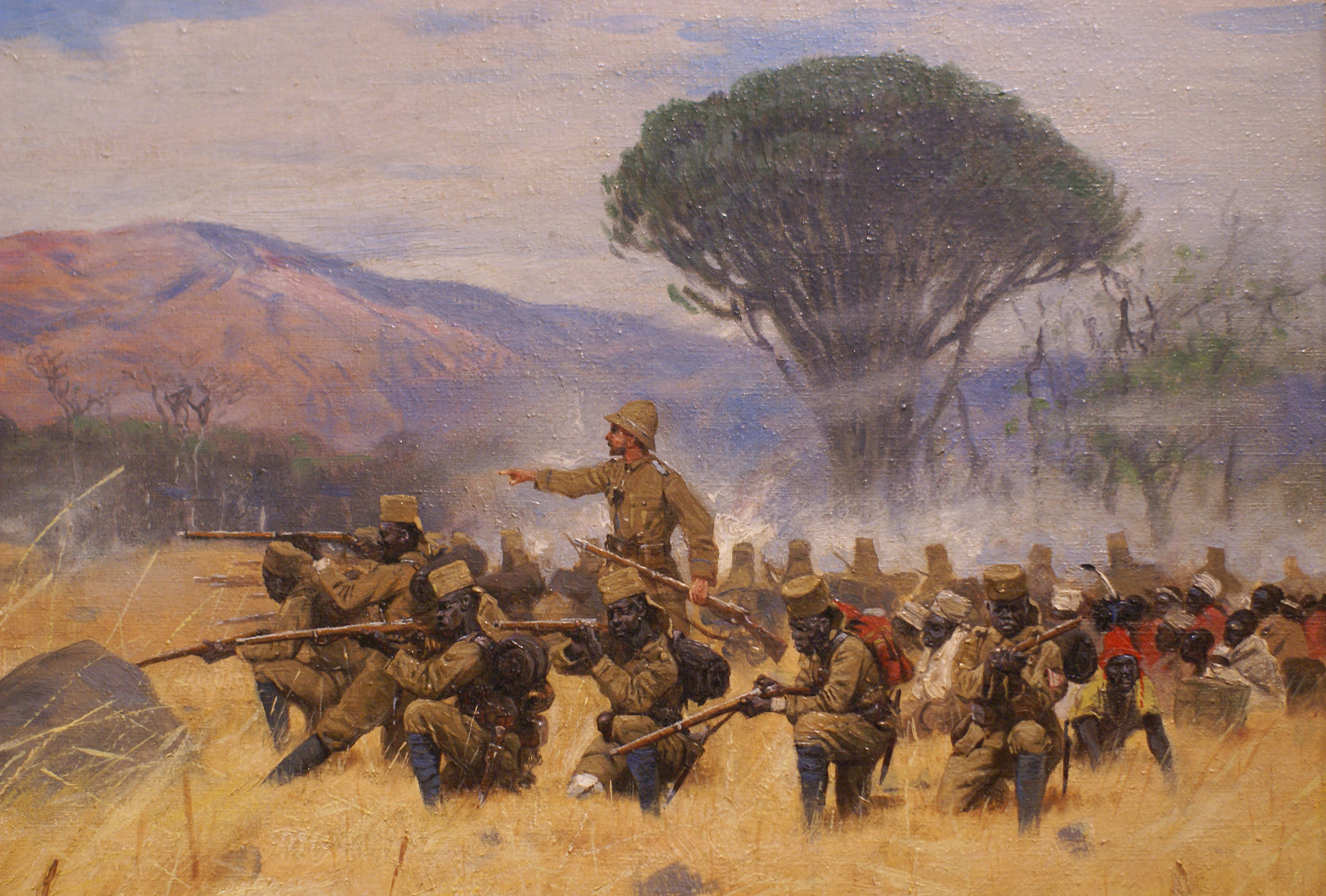
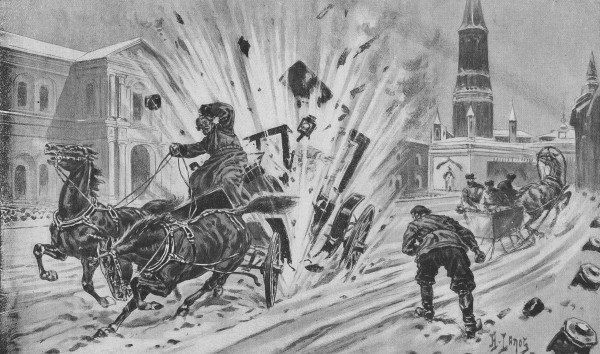
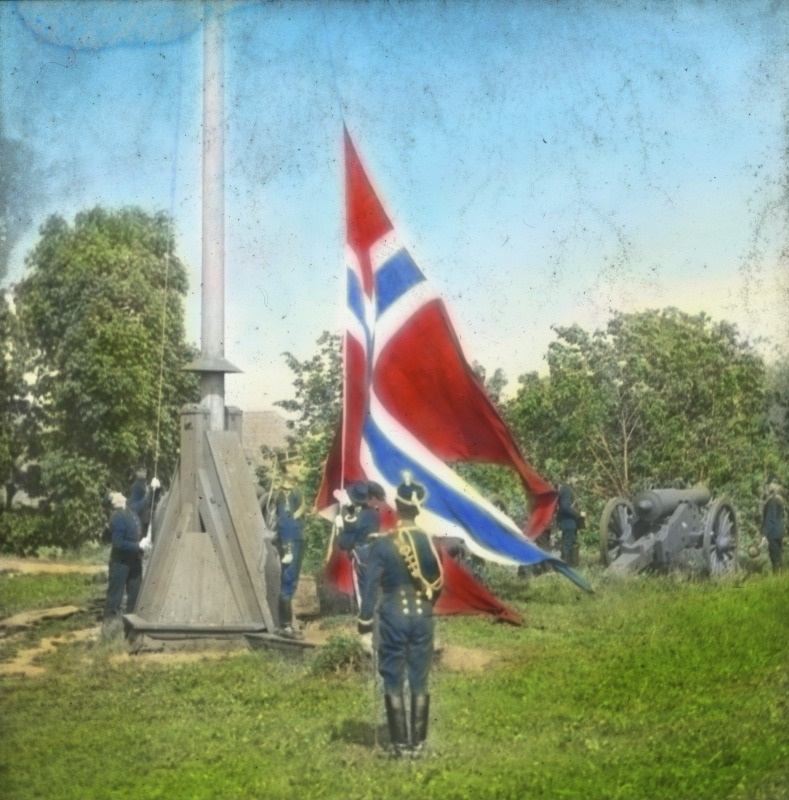
From top to bottom, left to right:
- The Russian Revolution of 1905 erupts after Bloody Sunday, sparking strikes, uprisings, and the creation of the Duma;
- The First Moroccan Crisis begins with Kaiser Wilhelm II’s visit to Tangier, straining Franco-German relations;
- The Battle of Tsushima ends in a decisive Japanese victory, reshaping power in East Asia;
- The Maji Maji Rebellion challenges German colonial rule in East Africa but is brutally suppressed;
- Grand Duke Sergei Alexandrovich of Russia is assassinated in Moscow;
- The Dissolution of the union between Norway and Sweden peacefully grants Norway independence.

1905 (MCMV) was a common year starting on Sunday of the Gregorian calendar and a common year starting on Saturday of the Julian calendar, the 1905th year of the Common Era (CE) and Anno Domini (AD) designations, the 905th year of the 2nd millennium, the 5th year of the 20th century, and the 6th year of the 1900s decade. As of the start of 1905, the Gregorian calendar was 13 days ahead of the Julian calendar, which remained in localized use until 1923.

As the second year of the massive Russo-Japanese War begins, more than 100,000 die in the largest world battles of that era, and the war chaos leads to the 1905 Russian Revolution against Nicholas II of Russia (Shostakovich's 11th Symphony is subtitled The Year 1905 to commemorate this) and the start of Revolution in the Kingdom of Poland. Canada and the U.S. expand west, with the Alberta and Saskatchewan provinces and the founding of Las Vegas. 1905 is also the year in which Albert Einstein, at this time resident in Bern, publishes his four Annus Mirabilis papers in Annalen der Physik (Leipzig) (March 18, May 11, June 30 and September 27), laying the foundations for more than a century's study of theoretical physics.

== Events ==
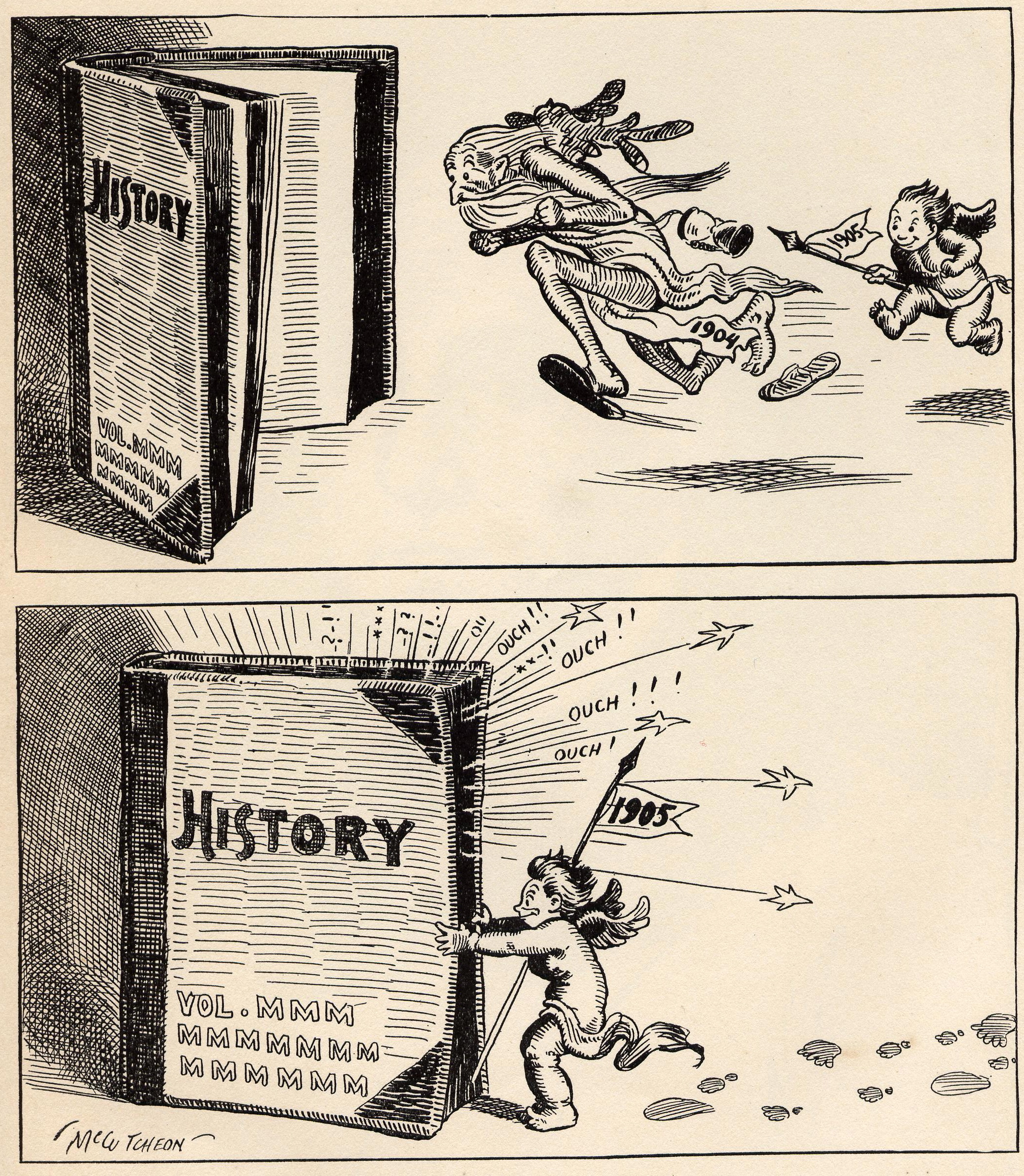
"Baby New Year", a cartoon by John T. McCutcheon depicting the new year 1905 chasing the old 1904 into the history books

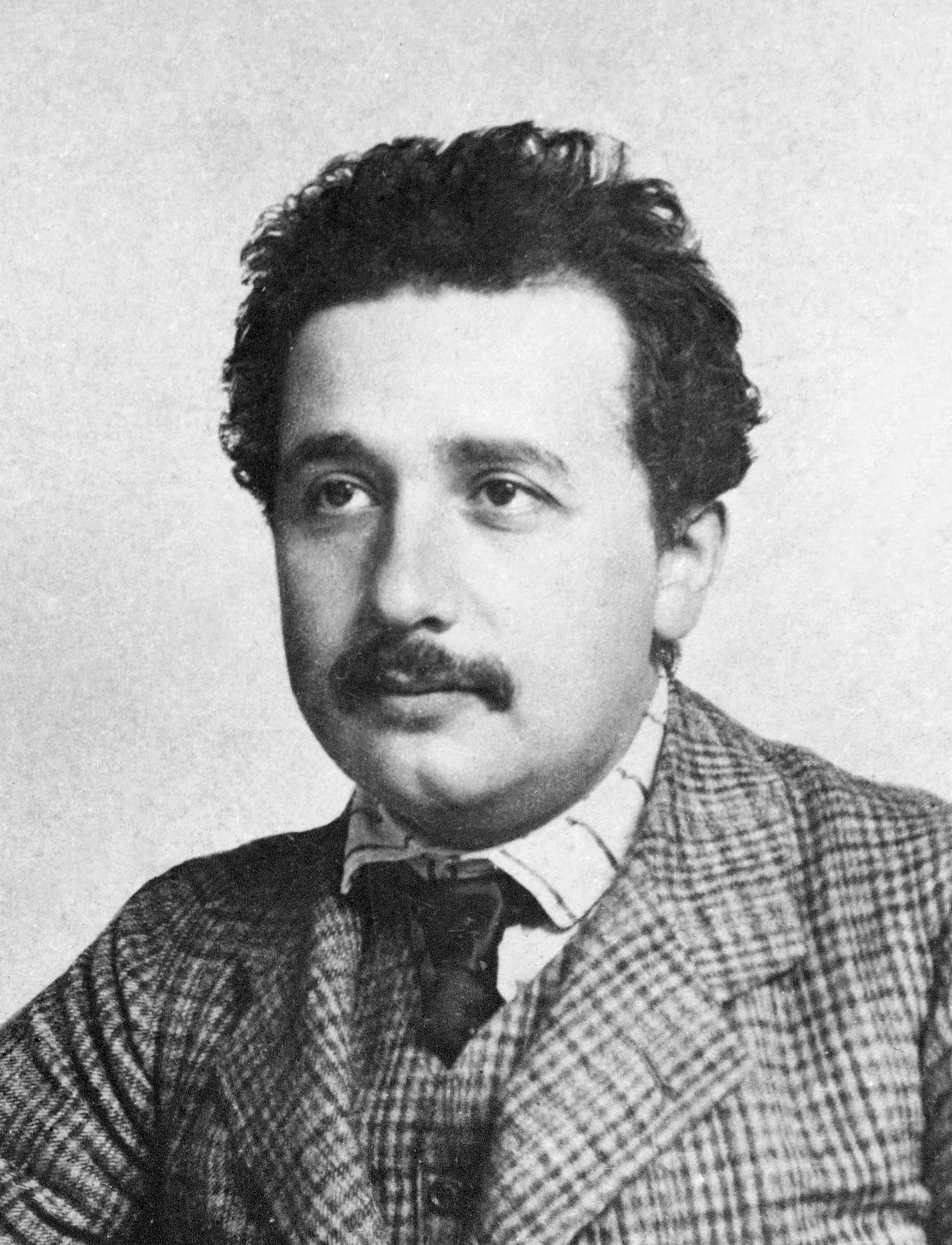
1905: Einstein's "miracle year"

=== January ===
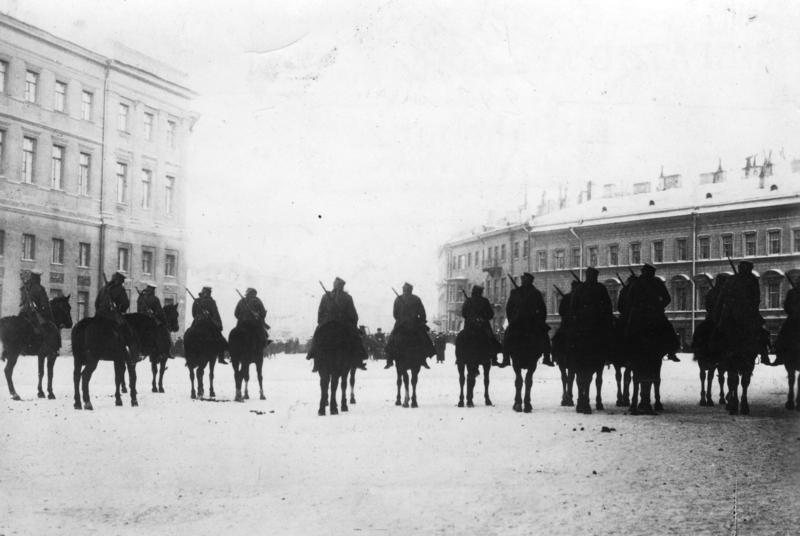
January 22 (9 O.S.): The Bloody Sunday massacre of Russian demonstrators at the Winter Palace in Saint Petersburg

- January 1 – In a major defeat in the Russo-Japanese War, Russian General Anatoly Stessel surrenders Port Arthur, located on mainland China, to the Japanese.
- January 3 – Japan formally repossesses Port Arthur, and renames it Ryojun, holding it for the next 40 years. The area will revert in 1945 to China, and become the Lushunkou District.
- January 4
  - Gheorghe Grigore Cantacuzino becomes Prime Minister of Romania for the second time, having previously served from 1899 to 1900, and remains in office for more than two years.
  - The city of Bend, Oregon, plotted out in 1900 by Alexander Drake, is incorporated as a town for local logging companies, and will have a population of 536 in 1910. By the year 2020, it will have almost 100,000 residents.
- January 5 – Baroness Emma Orczy's play The Scarlet Pimpernel, the forerunner of her novel, opens at the New Theatre in London, beginning a run of 122 performances and numerous revivals.
- January 6 – The Lick Observatory announces the discovery on 3 December 1904 of a sixth moon of Jupiter, made by their astronomer Charles D. Perrine.
- January 11 – Under the supervision of five editors, work begins on the comprehensive Catholic Encyclopedia, subtitled "An International Work of Reference on the Constitution, Doctrine, Discipline, and History of the Catholic Church." The first volume will appear in 1907.
- January 15 – A series of three 41 metres (135 ft) high tsunamis kill 61 people in Norway, after a rockslide sweeps down Mount Ramnefjell and crashes into Lake Lovatnet.
- January 17 – In France, Prime Minister Émile Combes and his cabinet announce their resignations after being implicated in the Affair of the Cards (L'Affaire des Fiches), a system set up by the War Ministry to purge the French Army officers corps of Jesuits.
- January 21 – The Dominican Republic signs an agreement with the United States to allow the U.S. to administer the collection of customs taxes for Santo Domingo for 50 years, with the U.S. to assume responsibility for payment of the Republic's debts to foreign nations from Dominican income. The agreement is done as an exercise of the "Roosevelt Corollary" to the Monroe Doctrine.
- January 22 (January 9 O.S.) – The Bloody Sunday massacre of peaceful Russian demonstrators at the Winter Palace in Saint Petersburg takes place, leading to an unsuccessful uprising.
- January 26 – (January 13 O.S. in Russia)
  - Russian Revolution of 1905: The Imperial Russian Army opens fire on demonstrators in Riga, Governorate of Livonia, killing 73 people and injuring 200.
  - Elections are held in Hungary for the Országgyűlés, the Kingdom's parliament within Austria-Hungary. Voters overwhelmingly reject the Liberal Party, led by Prime Minister István Tisza, that has ruled Hungary since 1875. The Liberals lose 118 of their 277 seats, but Emperor Franz Joseph I of Austria-Hungary ignores the results and keeps Tisza in power.
- January 27 – The Nelson Act is passed into law in the United States, providing for racial segregation of schools in the Alaska Territory.
- January 29 – Rioting breaks out in Warsaw, at this time under Russian Imperial rule with a Russian Governor-General.
- January 30 – The U.S. Supreme Court renders its unanimous decision in the landmark case of Swift & Co. v. United States, allowing the federal government to regulate monopolies.
- January 31 – "The greatest ball of the Gilded Age" is held by James Hazen Hyde, the heir to the fortune of the founder of the Equitable Life Assurance Association, at New York City's Sherry Hotel, spending $200,000 for a "Louis XV costume ball."

=== February ===
- February 1 – U.S. Senator John H. Mitchell of Oregon is indicted by a federal grand jury on charges arising from a scandal involving land grants in the state and illegally using his influence for private clients.
- February 3 – The first performance of A Shropshire Lad, the setting to music of the 1896 set of 63 poems of A. E. Housman by Arthur Somervell as a song-cycle, takes place at Aeolian Hall in London.
- February 4 – A simultaneous uprising begins at six cities in Argentina against the government of President Manuel Quintana.
- February 5 – The French ship Anjou is wrecked off of the coast of the uninhabited Auckland Island, located 290 miles (470 km) from the nearest inhabited land in New Zealand. The castaways live on the isle for more than three months until being rescued on May 7.
- February 6 – Eliel Soisalon-Soininen, the Chancellor of Justice of the Grand Duchy of Finland (at this time part of the Russian Empire) is assassinated at Helsingfors (Helsinki).
- February 9 – Prince A. Morrow begins the movement in the U.S. for sex education, with the founding of the Society of Sanitary and Moral Prophylaxis.
- February 12 – The Switzerland national football team plays its first international game, losing to France, 1 to 0.
- February 16 – Six of the 11 crew of the British Royal Navy submarine HMS A5 are killed by a pair of explosions caused by gasoline fumes in port in Ireland.
- February 17 – Grand Duke Sergei Alexandrovich of Russia, the Governor-General of Moscow and uncle of Tsar Nicholas II, is assassinated.
- February 20 – In the Russo-Japanese War, the Battle of Mukden begins in Manchuria.
- February 21 – Sir Wilfrid Laurier introduces a resolution in the Canadian parliament proposing that two new provinces, Alberta and Saskatchewan, be created out of the Northwest Territories.
- February 23 – Rotary International is founded in Chicago in the U.S.
- February 26 – Russia sustains a severe defeat in Manchuria at Tsen-ho-Cheng.
- February 28 – Jane Stanford, the co-founder with her husband Leland of Stanford University, is fatally poisoned while visiting the Moana Hotel in Hawaii.

=== March ===
- March 2 – Russia's Committee of Ministers votes to grant religious freedom to the subjects of the Russian Empire.
- March 3 – Tsar Nicholas II of Russia announces the creation of an elected assembly, the Duma, to represent the people of the Russian Empire in an advisory capacity, although the real power to make laws will remain with the Tsar and the cabinet of ministers.
- March 10 – Russo-Japanese War: The Japanese capture of Mukden (modern-day Shenyang) completes the rout of Russian armies in Manchuria.
- March 13 – Mata Hari introduces her exotic dance act in the Musée Guimet, Paris.
- March 14 – 23 of the 26 crew of the British barque Kyber die when the ship is wrecked off England's Land's End.
- March 18 – Albert Einstein submits his paper "On a heuristic viewpoint concerning the production and transformation of light", in which he explains the photoelectric effect using the notion of light quanta, for publication.
- March 20
  - The Grover Shoe Factory disaster kills 58 employees in Brockton, Massachusetts, when a boiler explodes and the factory building collapses.
  - The title Prime Minister of the United Kingdom is officially recognised by King Edward VII by a royal warrant.
- March 23 – The Theriso revolt begins in Crete as about 1,500 people led by Eleftherios Venizelos demand unification with Greece.
- March 29 – Jimmy Walsh knocks out Monte Attell, in a controversial six-round bout in Philadelphia, to win recognition of the World Bantamweight Championship by the National Boxing Association, despite being disqualified by the referee.

=== April ===
- April 1 – The British Imperial Penny Post is extended to include Australia.
- April 2 – The Simplon Tunnel through the Alps is opened to railway traffic.
- April 3 – A coal mine explosion at Zeigler, Illinois, kills 50 miners.
- April 4 – In India, the 1905 Kangra earthquake hits the Kangra Valley, kills 20,000 and destroys most buildings in Kangra, McLeod Ganj and Dharamshala.
- April 5 – The body of John Paul Jones, "Father of the American Navy", is located in Paris almost 113 years after his death.
- April 6 – A violent strike by the Teamsters' Union begins in Chicago.
- April 8 – Hundreds of people are killed in Spain in the collapse of a dam holding back a reservoir near Madrid.
- April 20 – The largest ocean liner in the world at this time, the German SS Amerika is launched.
- April 23 – German General Lothar von Trotha commander of troops in Germany's colony of Südwestafrika (modern-day Namibia), orders the extermination of the Nama people within the colony's borders, ultimately killing 10,000. Von Trotha's proclamation Aan de oorlogvorende Namastamme, proclaims that "The Nama who chooses not to surrender and lets himself be seen in German territory will be shot, until all are exterminated."
- April 24 – China's Empress Regent Cixi (Tzu Hsi) abolishes further use in executions of the nation's three most cruel torture execution methods, lingchi ("death by a thousand cuts"), gibbeting (similar to crucifixion, hanging until dying of exposure, thirst or starvation), and desecration of a dying person.
- April 28 – A tornado strikes Laredo, Texas and kills 100.
- April 30 – Albert Einstein completes his doctoral dissertation, A New Determination of Molecular Dimensions (submitted July 30 to the University of Zurich).

=== May ===
- May 4 –The first world championship of professional wrestling takes place at Madison Square Garden in New York City.
- May 9 – Upon the death of U.S. social activist Ann Reeves Jarvis In West Virginia, her daughter Anna Jarvis resolves to campaign across the United States for a proposed "Mother's Day".
- May 10 – The 1905 Snyder tornado destroys the town of Snyder, Oklahoma, killing 97.
- May 11 – Albert Einstein submits for publication his paper "Über die von der molekularkinetischen Theorie der Wärme geforderte Bewegung von in ruhenden Flüssigkeiten suspendierten Teilchen" ("On the Motion of Small Particles Suspended in a Stationary Liquid, as Required by the Molecular Kinetic Theory of Heat"), based on his doctoral research, delineating a stochastic model of Brownian motion.
- May 15 – Las Vegas, Nevada, is founded when 110 acres (45 ha) of land adjacent to the Union Pacific Railroad tracks are auctioned to form what becomes Downtown Las Vegas.
- May 22 – Abdul Hamid II, the Sultan of the Ottoman Empire establishes the Ullah millet for the Aromanians of the empire. For this reason, the Aromanian National Day is sometimes celebrated on this day. The decision is publicly announced the next day, which is more commonly celebrated.
- May 28 – Japanese victory in the Battle of Tsushima, the only decisive battle fought between fleets of battleships; Russian personnel losses were 216 officers and 4,614 men killed; with 278 officers and 5,629 men taken as prisoners of war (POWs). Interned in neutral ports were 79 officers and 1,783 men. Escaping to Vladivostok and Diego-Suarez were 62 officers and 1,165 men. Eight battleships and three coastal battleships were either sunk, scuttled or captured. The Japanese lost three torpedo boats and 117 officers and men killed, with 583 officers and men wounded.
- May 30 – Japan's Prime Minister Katsura Tarō asks U.S. President Theodore Roosevelt to moderate peace discussions to end the Russo-Japanese War.

=== June ===
- June 1 – The Lewis and Clark Centennial Exposition opens in Portland, Oregon.
- June 7 – The Norwegian Parliament, the Storting, declares dissolution of the union between Norway and Sweden, giving Norway full independence.
- June 13 – Theodoros Deligiannis, Prime Minister of Greece, is assassinated.
- June 15 – British Princess Margaret of Connaught marries Prince Gustaf Adolf of Sweden, Duke of Skåne, the future King Gustaf VI Adolf.
- June 17 – Austrian Football Club FC Admira Wacker is founded as SK Admira Wien in Vienna.
- June 18 – A coal mine explosion in Russia kills 500 employees at the Ivan Colliery at Kharsisk.
- June 20 – Ernest Henry Starling introduces the word "hormone" into the English language.
- June 21 – New York Central Railroad's 20th Century Limited train is derailed in an apparent act of sabotage, killing 21 people.
- June 25 – The Danish Navy training ship Georg Stage is accidentally sunk in port in Copenhagen after English steamship Ancona collides with it, killing 22 teenage recruits.
- June 28 – "Pomp and Circumstance" is first played as a graduation march, after Yale University music professor Samuel Sanford invited its composer, Sir Edward Elgar, to receive an honorary degree.
- June 29 – The Automobile Association is founded in the United Kingdom.
- June 30 – Albert Einstein submits for publication his paper "On the Electrodynamics of Moving Bodies", establishing his theory of special relativity.

=== July ===
- July 1 – Hundreds of people die in the flooding of Guanajuato in Mexico.
- July 3 – France's Chamber of Deputies passes a bill for separation of church and state, 341 to 233.
- July 5 – Alfred Deakin takes office as the new Prime Minister of Australia.
- July 10 – A Japanese expedition takes control of the Russian island of Sakhalin after a short battle.
- July 11 – National Colliery disaster at Wattstown in the Rhondda valley of Wales: an underground explosion kills 120, with just one survivor.
- July 12 –The University of Sheffield is officially opened by King Edward VII in England.
- July 14 – In New Zealand, the first known suicide attack by a civilian (as opposed to sacrifices made in military combat) takes place in Murchison.
- July 15 – The popular fictional character Arsène Lupin, the gentleman thief, is introduced in France.
- July 21 – Sixty members of the crew of the USS Bennington are killed in an explosion of the U.S. Navy gunboat in the harbor at San Diego.
- July 24 – The 1905 Bolnai earthquake (8.4 magnitude) strikes Mongolia, the second-largest on record here.
- July 27 – The Taft–Katsura agreement is reached in Tokyo.
- July 30 – At Basel in Switzerland, the International Zionist Conference delegates vote to reject the British offer of land in Uganda for a Jewish homeland.

=== August ===
- August 8 – Fourteen employees of a department store in Albany, New York are killed when the building collapses suddenly.
- August 9 – The peace conference to end the Russo-Japanese War between Russia and Japan begins at Portsmouth, New Hampshire.
- August 11 – The Russian Council appointed by Tsar Nicholas II meets at Peterhof and approves a plan for a national Duma, the first representative assembly in the Empire.
- August 12 – The first running takes place of the Shelsley Walsh Speed Hill Climb in England, the world's oldest motorsport event to be staged continuously on its original course.
- August 13 – At a referendum in Norway, voters opt almost unanimously for dissolution of the union with Sweden.
- August 20 – Chinese revolutionary leader Sun Yat-sen forms the first chapter of Tongmenghui, a union of all secret societies determined to bringing down the Manchu dynasty.
- August 22 – The sinking of the Japanese ferry Kinjo Maru kills 160 people after the British ship HMS Baralong collides with it in the Sea of Japan.
- August 26 – Near Point Barrow, Alaska, the crew of the Norwegian ship Gjoa, led by Roald Amundsen, make the breakthrough of finding the long-sought "Northwest Passage" from the Atlantic to the Pacific Ocean.
- August 30 – A solar eclipse takes place, with greatest visibility in North Africa.

=== September ===
- September 1 – The Canadian provinces of Alberta and Saskatchewan are established from the southwestern part of the Northwest Territories.
- September 2 – The millennia-old imperial examination system for the civil service is abolished in Qing dynasty China.
- September 5 – Russo-Japanese War: Treaty of Portsmouth – In New Hampshire, a treaty mediated by U.S. President Theodore Roosevelt is signed by Japan and Russia. Russia cedes the island of Sakhalin together with port and rail rights in Manchuria to Japan.
- September 8 – The 7.2 M_{w} Calabria earthquake shakes Southern Italy with a maximum Mercalli intensity of XI (Extreme), killing between 557 and 2,500 people.
- September 10 – Crystal Palace F.C. is founded in London.
- September 27
  - Albert Einstein submits for publication his paper "Does the Inertia of a Body Depend Upon Its Energy Content?", in which he puts forward the idea of mass–energy equivalence by publishing the equation E = mc^{2} (published November 21).
  - Da-Qing Bank, predecessor of Bank of China, is founded in Peiping.

=== October ===
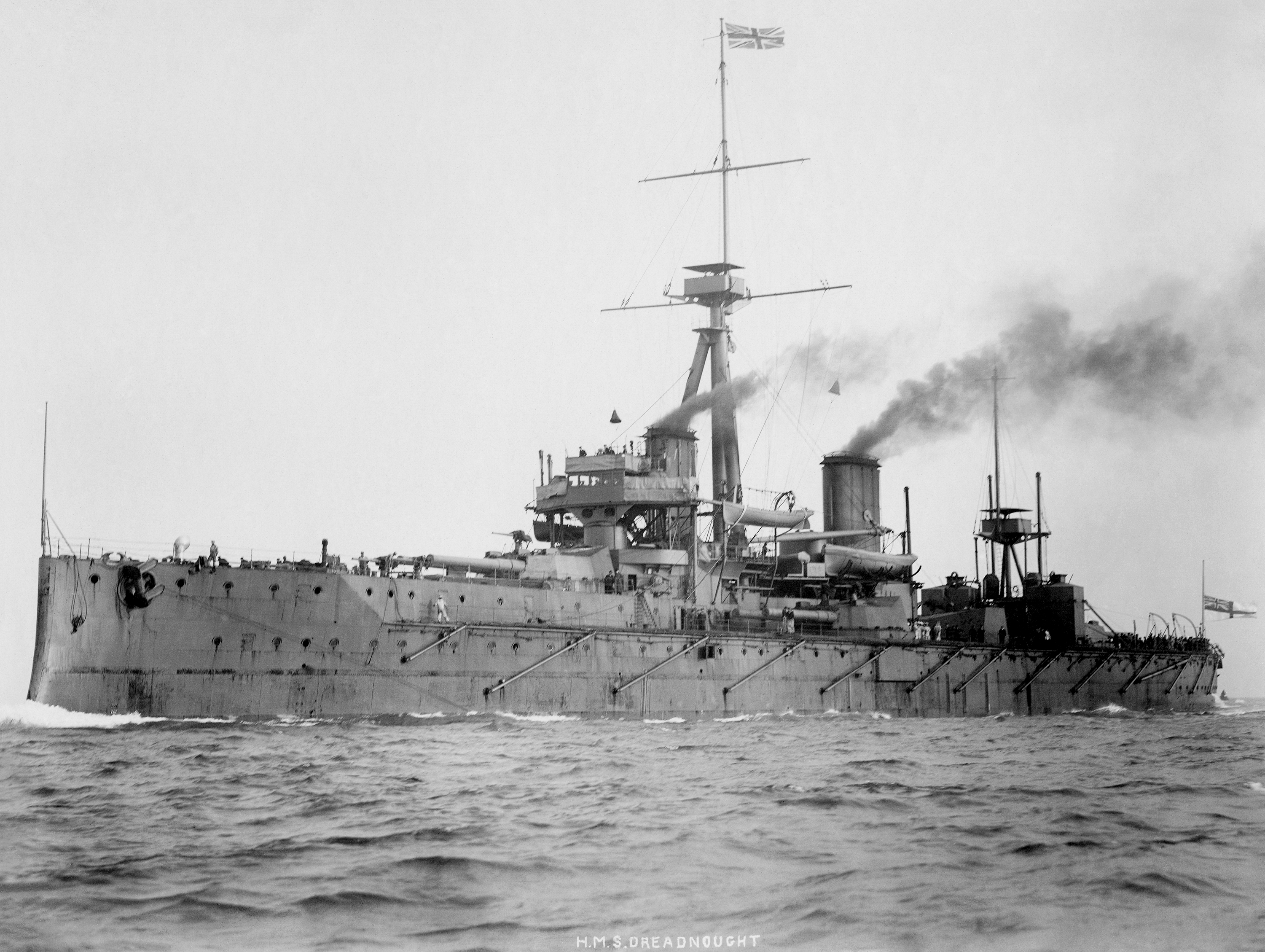
October 2: HMS Dreadnought

- October 1
  - A Czech worker, František Pavlík, is bayoneted to death during a demonstration for a Czech university in Brno. This event is the motivation for a piano sonata, 1. X. 1905, by Leoš Janáček, which premieres on 27 January 1906.
  - Turkish Association football team Galatasaray is founded in Istanbul.
- October 2 – HMS Dreadnought (1906) is laid down in the United Kingdom, revolutionizing battleship design and triggering a naval arms race.
- October 5 – The Wright brothers' third aeroplane (Wright Flyer III) stays in the air for 39 minutes with Wilbur piloting, the first aeroplane flight lasting over half an hour.
- October 11 – The Institute of Musical Art, predecessor of the Juilliard School, opens in New York City.
- October 13 – Annie Kenney and Christabel Pankhurst interrupt a Liberal Party (UK) rally at the Free Trade Hall in Manchester, England, and choose imprisonment when convicted, the first militant action of the suffragette campaign.
- October 16 – The Partition of Bengal is made by Lord Curzon to separate the region of Bengal into Muslim and Hindu territories until its reunification in 1911.
- October 26 Sweden–Norway agrees to the repeal of the union with Norway, forming the two modern-day countries.
- October 29 (October 16 O.S.) – In the Russian Empire:
  - Russian Revolution of 1905: The Imperial Russian Army opens fire on a meeting at a street market in Tallinn, Governorate of Estonia, killing 94 and injuring over 200 people.
  - The Circum-Baikal Railway is brought into permanent operation, completing through rail communication on the Trans-Siberian Railway.
- October 30 (October 17 Old Style) – October Manifesto: Tsar Nicholas II of Russia is forced to announce the granting of his country's first constitution (the Russian Constitution of 1906), conceding a national assembly (State Duma) with limited powers.
- October – Fauvist artists, led by Henri Matisse and André Derain, first exhibit their works, at the Salon d'Automne in Paris.

=== November ===
- November–December – Russian Revolution of 1905: In the Baltic governorates, workers and peasants burn and loot hundreds of Baltic German manors. The Imperial Russian Army thereafter executes and deports thousands of looters.
- November 4 – Russification of Finland: The application of the February Manifesto, removing the veto of the Diet of the autonomous Grand Duchy of Finland over matters considered by the Emperor to concern Russian imperial interests, is interrupted by the new November Manifesto. The Senate of Finland is ordered to put forward a proposal for parliamentary reform, based on unicameralism and universal and equal suffrage.
- November 12 – Norway holds a plebiscite on the monarchy, resulting in popular approval of the Storting's decision to authorise the government to make the offer of the throne of the newly independent country.
- November 17 – The Japan–Korea Treaty of 1905 ("Eulsa Treaty") effectively makes Korea a protectorate of Japan.
- November 28 – The Mataafa Storm buffets the Great Lakes region. Named after the Mataafa, a boat sunk outside of the Duluth Ship Canal, the storm ultimately destroys 29 vessels, leading to 29 deaths and shipping losses of US$3.567 million (1905 dollars).
- November 28 – Irish nationalist Arthur Griffith founds Sinn Féin in Dublin, as a political party whose goal is independence for all of Ireland.

=== December ===
- December 2 – Norsk Hydro, predecessor of Equinor, a state-run energy product and grid brand in Scandinavia, is founded in Norway.
- December 7–18 – Moscow Uprising: A Bolshevik-led revolt is suppressed by the army.
- December 11 – In support of the Moscow Uprising, the Council of Workers' Deputies of Kiev stages a mass uprising, establishing the Shuliavka Republic in the city, December 12–16.
- December 23 – The Tampere conference, where Vladimir Lenin and Joseph Stalin meet for the first time, is held in Tampere, Finland.
- December 30
  - A bomb kills Frank Steunenberg, ex-governor of Idaho; the case leads to a trial against leaders of the Western Federation of Miners.
  - Franz Lehár's operetta The Merry Widow is first performed, at the Theater an der Wien, Vienna.

=== Date unknown ===
- Pathé Frères colors black and white films by machine.
- Alfred Einhorn introduces novocaine.

== Births ==
=== January – March ===
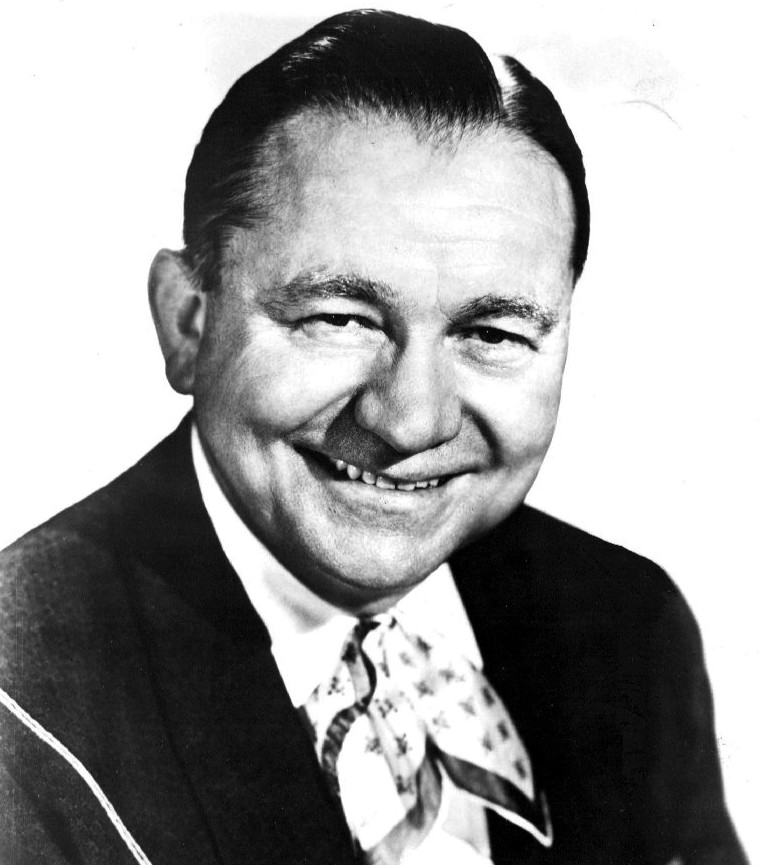
Tex Ritter

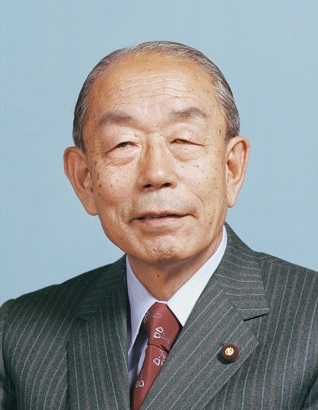
Takeo Fukuda

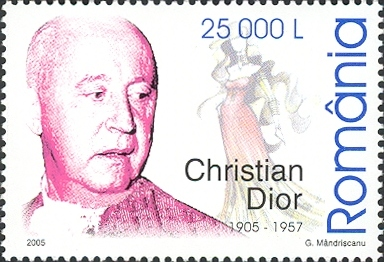
Christian Dior

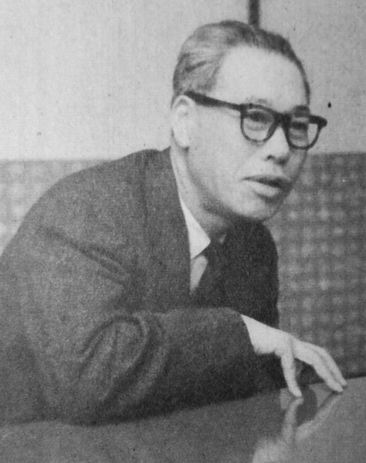
Takashi Shimura

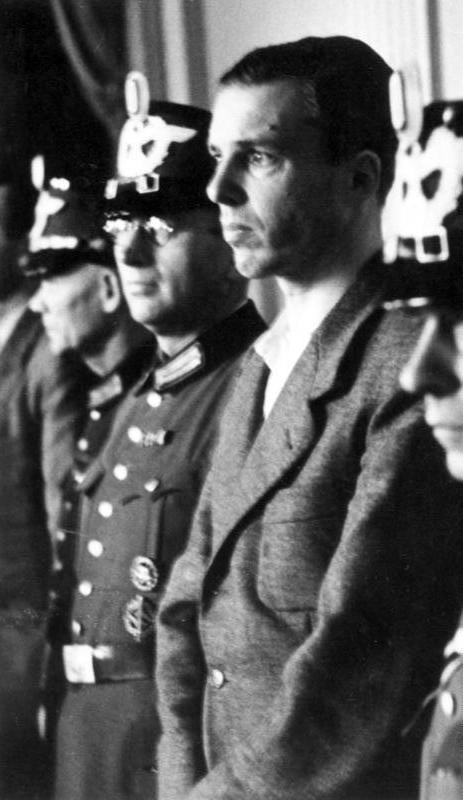
Berthold Schenk Graf von Stauffenberg

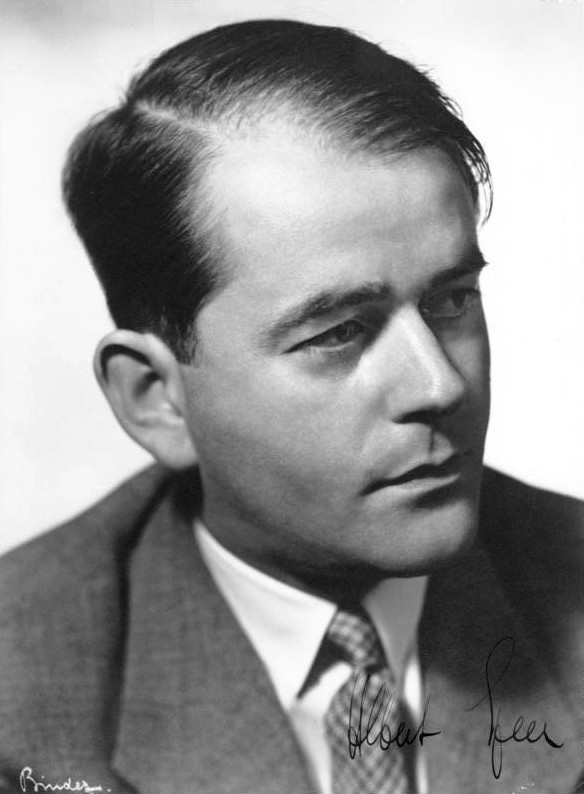
Albert Speer

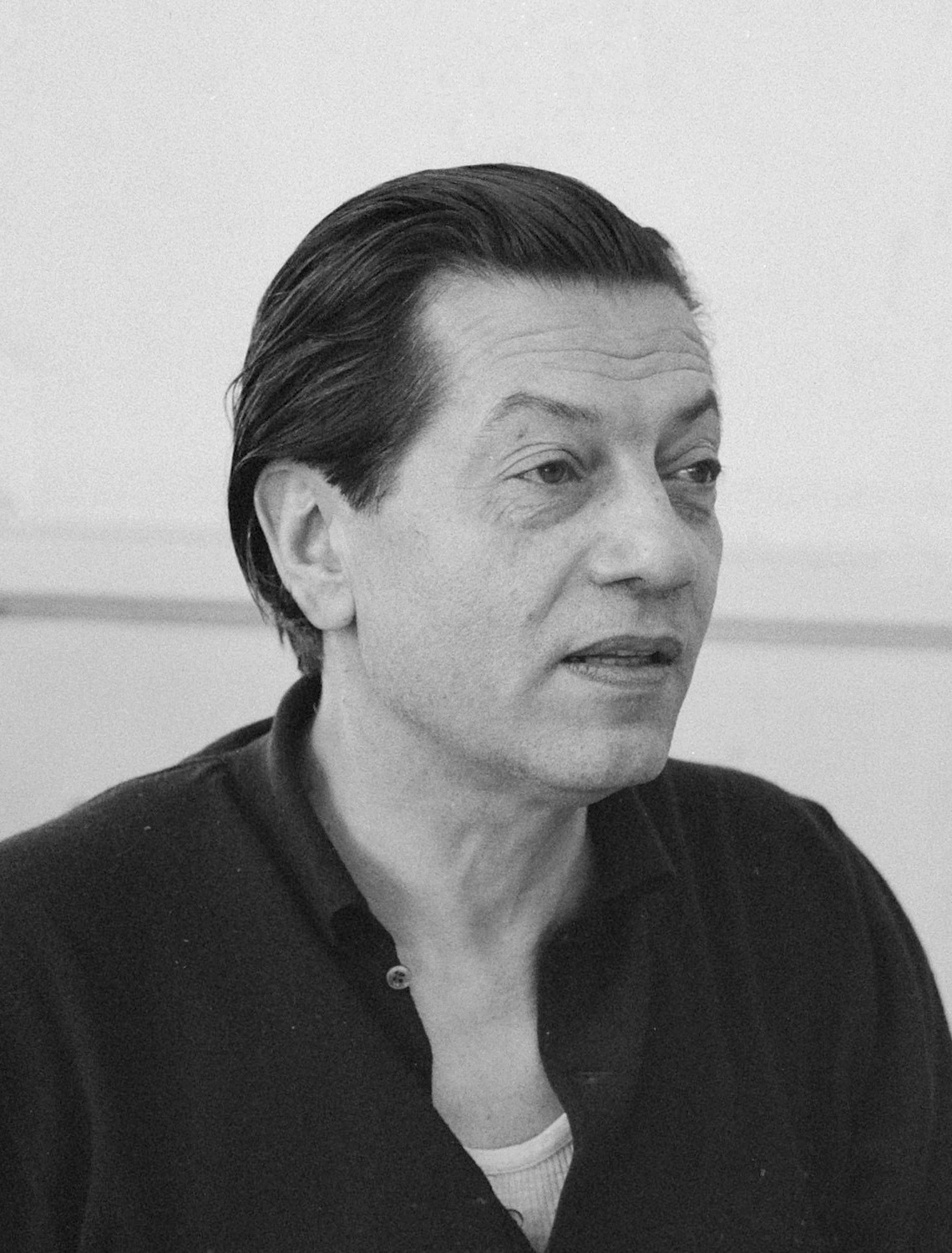
Serge Lifar

- January 2
  - Michael Tippett, English composer (d. 1998)
  - Anna May Wong, American actress (d. 1961)
- January 3 – Nobuhito, Prince Takamatsu, younger brother of Japanese Emperor Hirohito (d. 1987)
- January 12
  - Tex Ritter, American actor and singer (d. 1974)
  - Nihal Atsız, Turkish ultranationalist writer, novelist, and poet (d. 1975)
  - Lotta Dempsey, Canadian journalist, editor and television personality (d. 1988)
- January 13 – Kay Francis, American actress (d. 1968)
- January 14
  - Sterling Holloway, American actor (d. 1992)
  - Takeo Fukuda, 67th Prime Minister of Japan (1976–1978) (d. 1995)
- January 17
  - D. R. Kaprekar, Indian recreational mathematician (d. 1986)
  - Saeb Salam, 4-time prime minister of Lebanon (d. 2000)
- January 18 – Joseph Bonanno (Joe Bananas), American gangster (d. 2002)
- January 21 – Christian Dior, French couturier (d. 1957)
- January 26
  - Maria von Trapp, Austrian singer and leader of the Trapp Family Singers, whose life is dramatized in The Sound of Music (d. 1987)
  - Charles Lane, American actor (d. 2007)
- January 29 – Barnett Newman, American painter (d. 1970)
- January 31 – John O'Hara, American writer (d. 1970)
- February 1 – Emilio Segrè, Italian physicist, Nobel Prize laureate (d. 1989)
- February 2 – Ayn Rand, Russian-born American author, philosopher (The Fountainhead) (d. 1982)
- February 6 – Hugh Beadle, Rhodesian lawyer, politician and judge (d. 1980)
- February 7 – Ulf von Euler, Swedish physiologist, academic and Nobel Prize laureate (d. 1983)
- February 13 – Ra'ana Liaquat Ali Khan, Pakistani stateswoman, First Lady of Pakistan (d. 1990)
- February 15 – Harold Arlen, American popular music composer (d. 1986)
- February 23 – D. H. Lehmer, American mathematician (d. 1991)
- February 27
  - Tone Peruško, Croatian educator and social worker (d. 1967)
  - Franchot Tone, American actor (d. 1968)
- March 3 – Marie Glory, French silent-screen actress (d. 2009)
- March 12 – Takashi Shimura, Japanese actor (d. 1982)
- March 15 – Berthold Schenk Graf von Stauffenberg, German lawyer, Nazi opponent (d. 1944)
- March 18 – Robert Donat, English actor (d. 1958)
- March 19 – Albert Speer, German Nazi official, architect (d. 1981)
- March 20
  - Serge Lifar, Ukrainian-born French dancer and choreographer (d. 1986)
  - Raymond Cattell, British-born American psychologist (d. 1998)
  - Vera Panova, Soviet-Russian writer (d. 1973)
- March 23
  - Lale Andersen, German singer (d. 1972)
  - John Randall, English physicist, biophysicist (d. 1984)
- March 25 – Pote Sarasin, Thai diplomat and politician, 9th Prime Minister of Thailand (d. 2000)
- March 26 - Viktor Frankl, Austrian psychologist and neurologist (d. 1997)
- March 29 – Philip Ahn, Korean-American actor (d. 1978)
- March 30
  - Mikio Oda, Japanese athlete (d. 1998)
  - Albert Pierrepoint, British executioner (d. 1992)

=== April – June ===
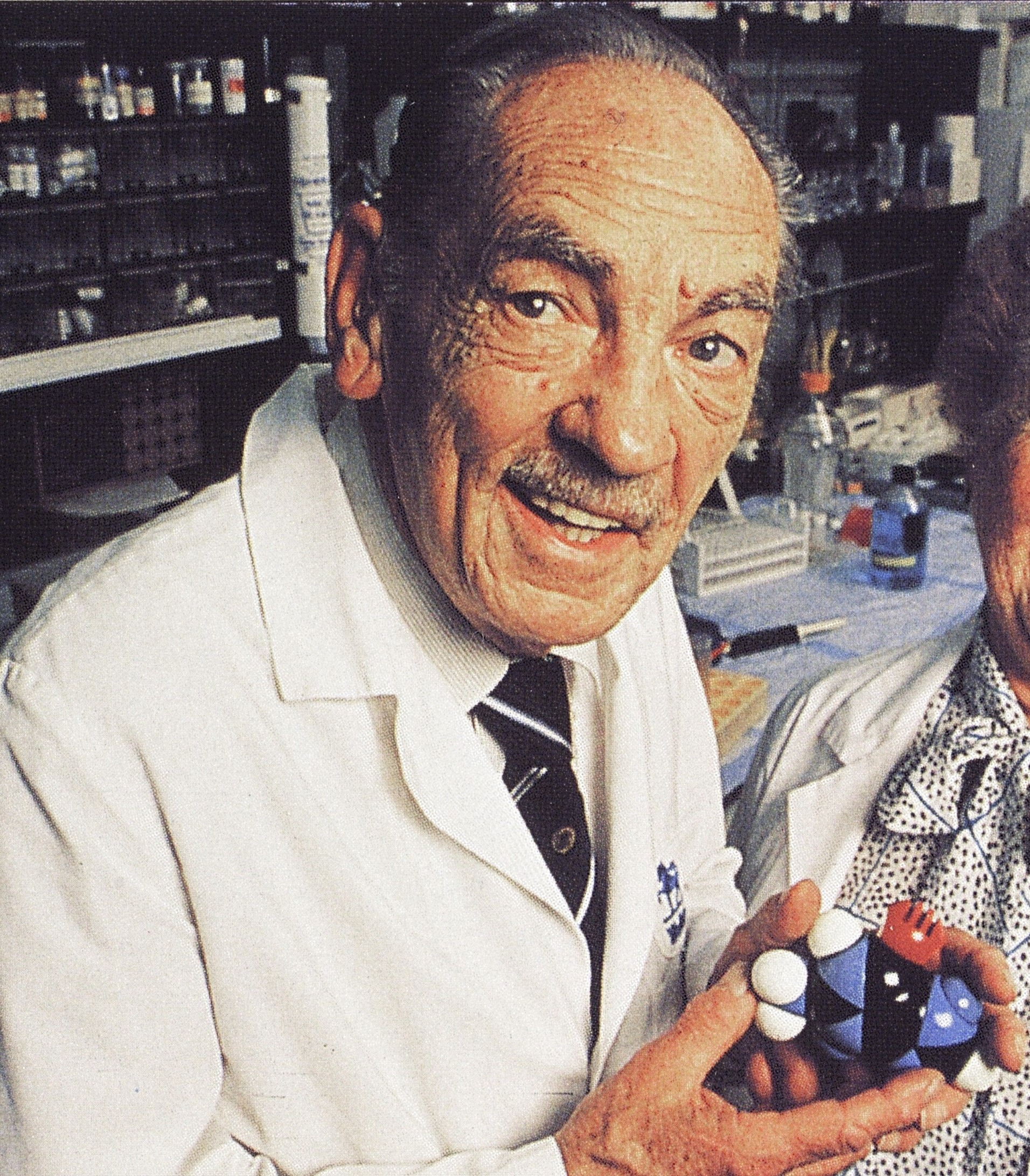
George H. Hitchings

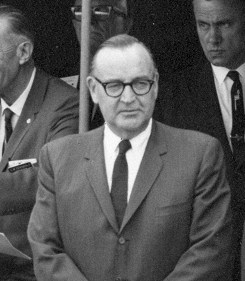
Pat Brown

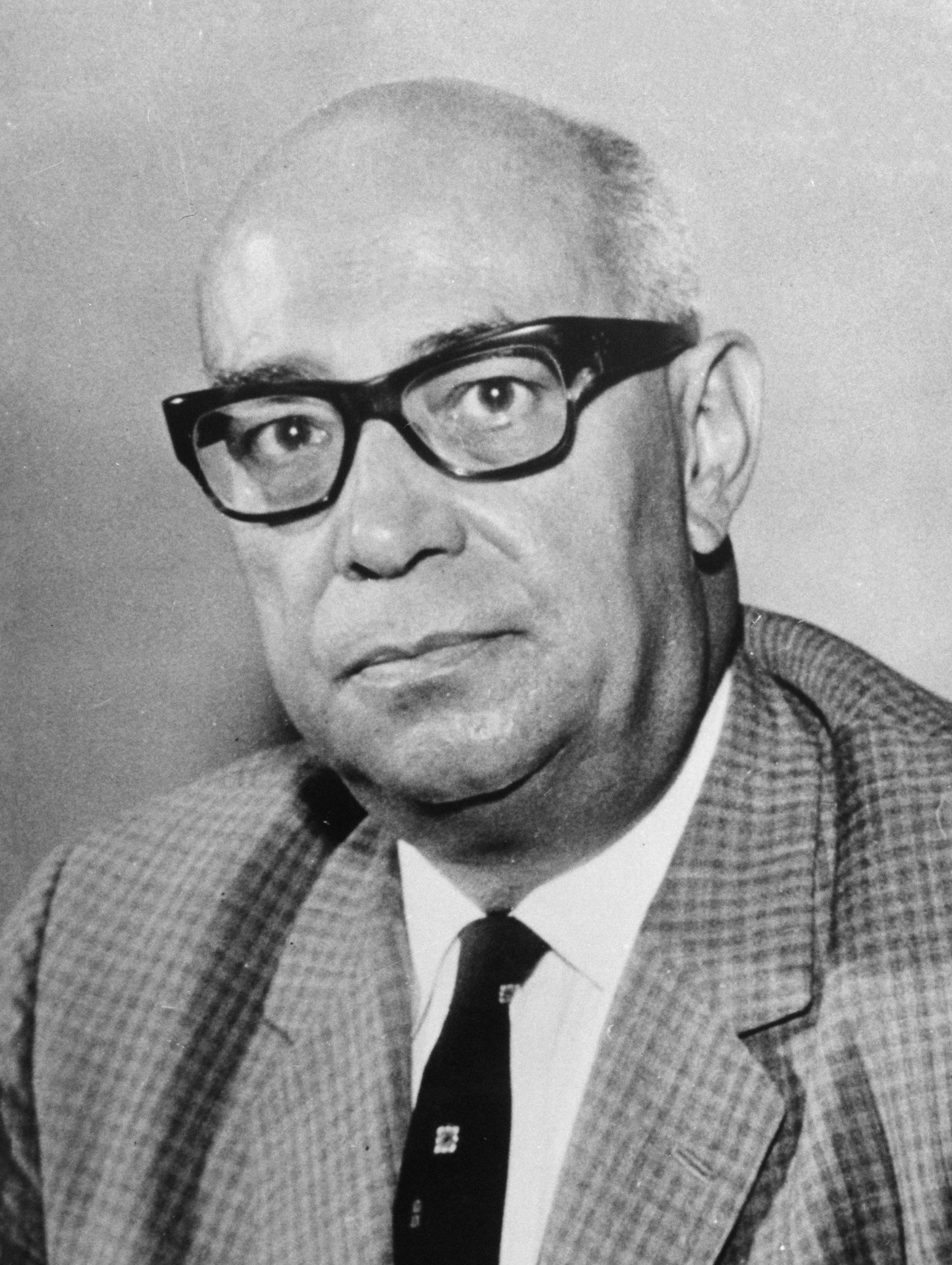
Raúl Leoni

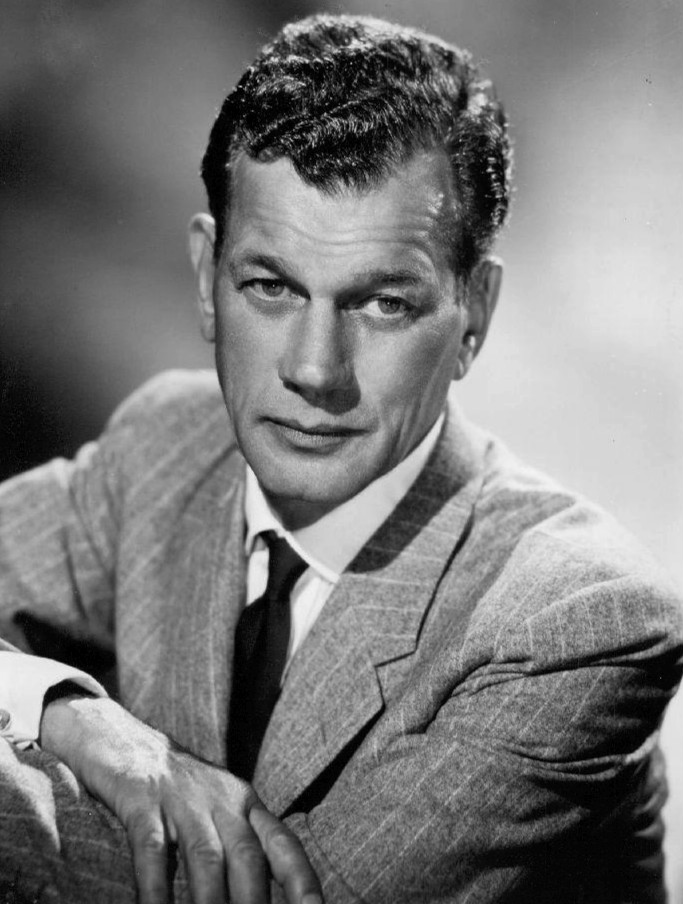
Joseph Cotten

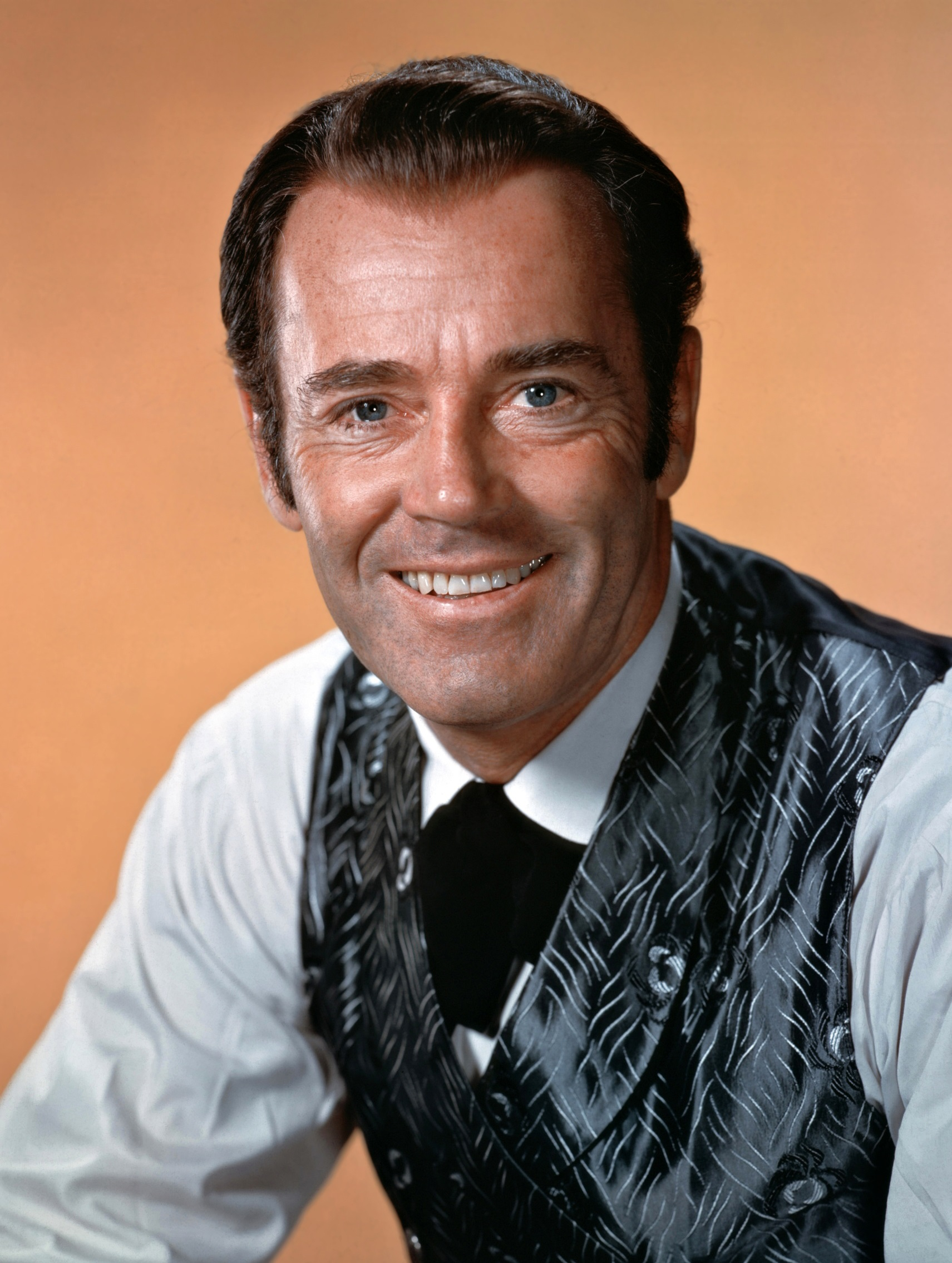
Henry Fonda

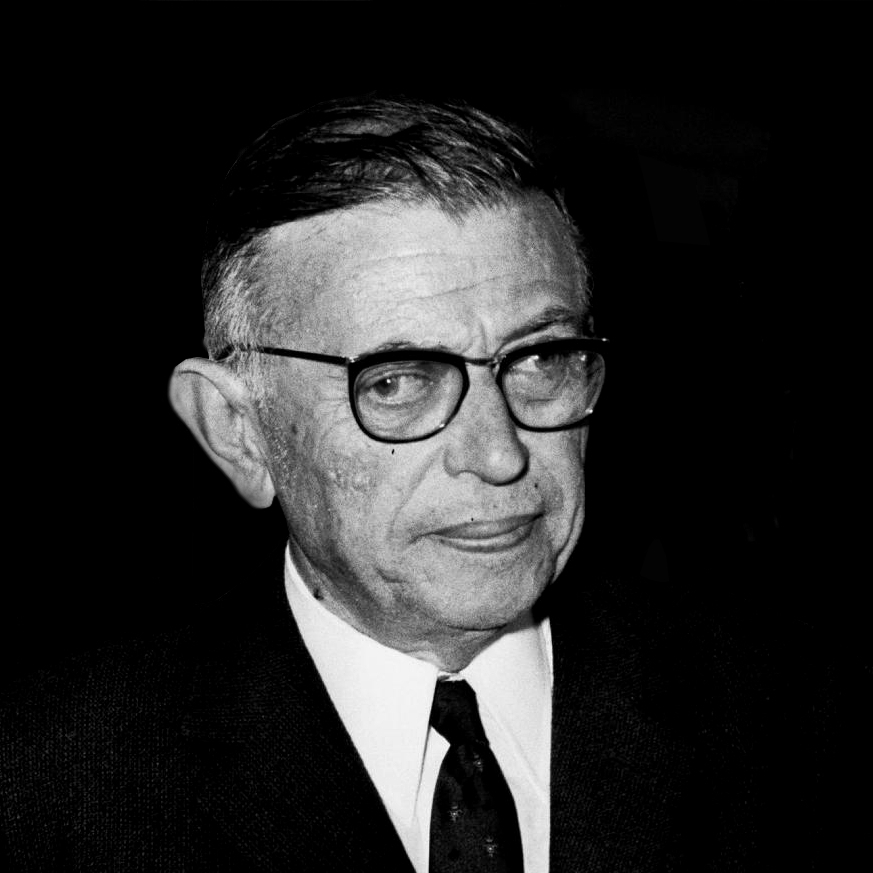
Jean-Paul Sartre

- April 1
  - Gaston Eyskens, Prime Minister of Belgium (d. 1988)
  - Paul Hasluck, Australian statesman, 17th Governor-General of Australia (d. 1993)
- April 18 – George H. Hitchings, American physician, pharmacologist and Nobel Prize laureate (d. 1998)
- April 21 – Pat Brown, American lawyer, politician and 32nd Governor of California (d. 1996)
- April 25 – George Nēpia, New Zealand Maori rugby player (d. 1986)
- April 26 – Raúl Leoni, President of Venezuela (d. 1972)
- May 3
  - Werner Fenchel, German mathematician (d. 1988)
  - Albrecht, Duke of Bavaria, Bavarian prince (d. 1996)
- May 5 – Floyd Gottfredson, American cartoonist, primarily known for the Mickey Mouse comic strip (d. 1986)
- May 7 – Philip Baxter, British-born Australian chemical engineer (d. 1989)
- May 9 – Lilí Álvarez, Spanish tennis player, author and feminist (d. 1998)
- May 11 – Lise de Baissac, Mauritian-born SOE agent, war hero (d. 2004)
- May 13
  - Fakhruddin Ali Ahmed, Indian lawyer, politician, 5th President of India (d. 1977)
  - David Griffin, Canadian Olympic athlete, journalist, RCAF officer (d. 1944)
- May 15 – Joseph Cotten, American actor (d. 1994)
- May 16 – Henry Fonda, American actor (d. 1982)
- May 22 – Tom Driberg, British politician and journalist (d. 1976)
- May 24 – Mikhail Sholokhov, Russian novelist, short story writer and Nobel Prize laureate (d. 1984)
- May 27 – Young Corbett III, Italian-born American boxer (d. 1993)
- May 28 – Sada Abe, Japanese actress (d. after 1971)
- May 29 – Sebastian Shaw, English actor (d. 1994)
- June 1 – Robert Newton, English actor (d. 1956)
- June 3
  - Tupua Tamasese Meaʻole, Samoan politician (d. 1963)
  - Martin Gottfried Weiss, Nazi commandant (d. 1946)
- June 5 – John Abbott, English actor (d. 1996)
- June 7 – James J. Braddock, American heavyweight boxer (d. 1974)
- June 11 – Simonne Caillère, French mineralogist and geologist (d. 1999)
- June 12 – Ray Barbuti, American athlete (d. 1975)
- June 13
  - Franco Riccardi, Italian fencer (d. 1968)
  - Chen Yun, elder of the Chinese Communist Party (d. 1995)
- June 19 – Mildred Natwick, American stage, film actress (d. 1994)
- June 21 – Jean-Paul Sartre, French existentialist (d. 1980)
- June 23
  - Jack Pickersgill, Canadian civil servant and politician (d. 1997)
  - Isaac Schapera, English anthropologist (d. 2003)
  - Mary Livingstone, American radio comedian (d. 1983)
- June 26 – Jack Longland, British educator, mountain climber and broadcaster (d. 1993)
- June 27 – Kwan Tak-hing, Hong Kong actor (d. 1996)
- June 28 – Ashley Montagu, British-American anthropologist (d. 1999)
- June 30 – Nestor Paiva, American actor (d. 1966)

=== July – September ===
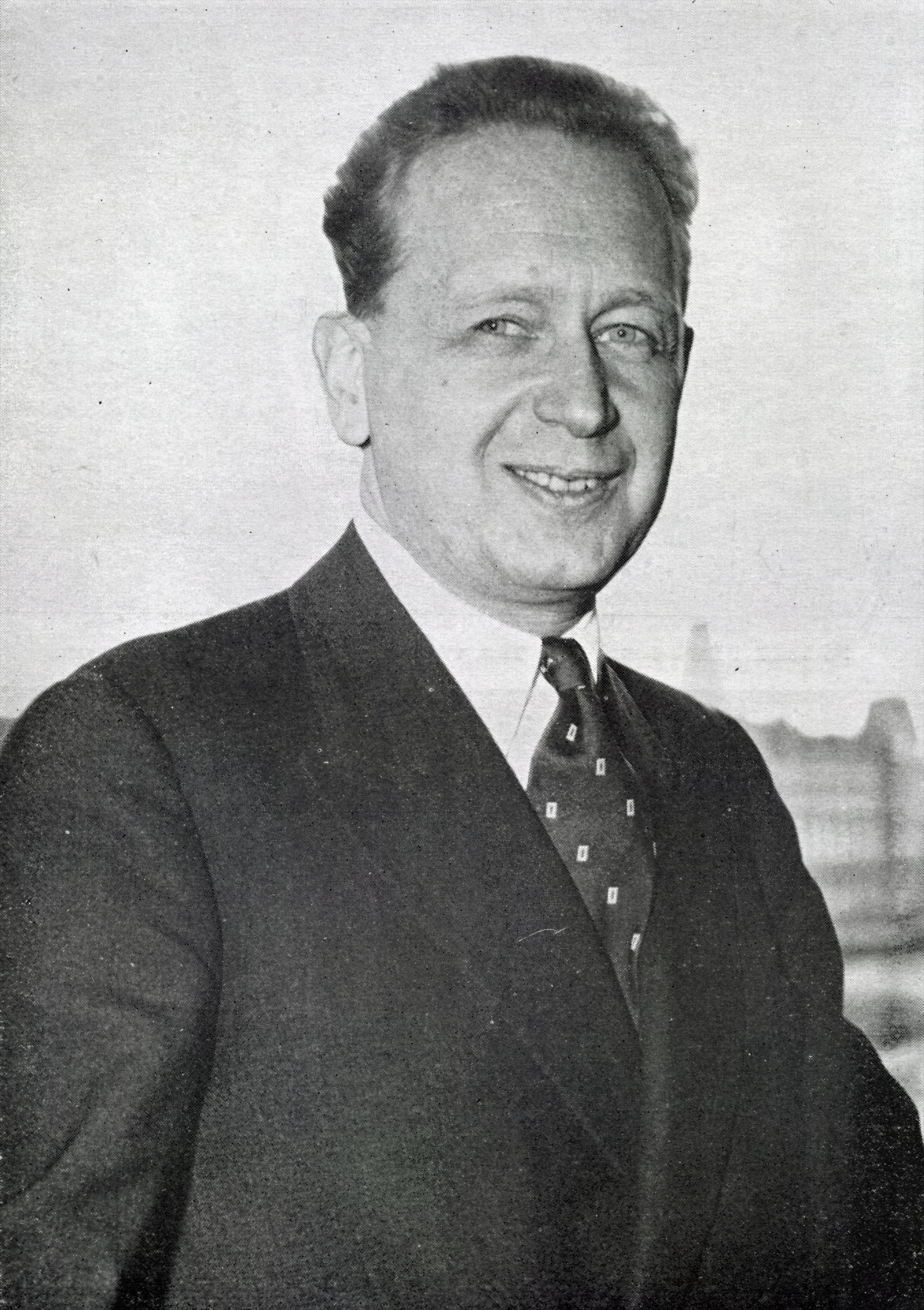
Dag Hammarskjöld

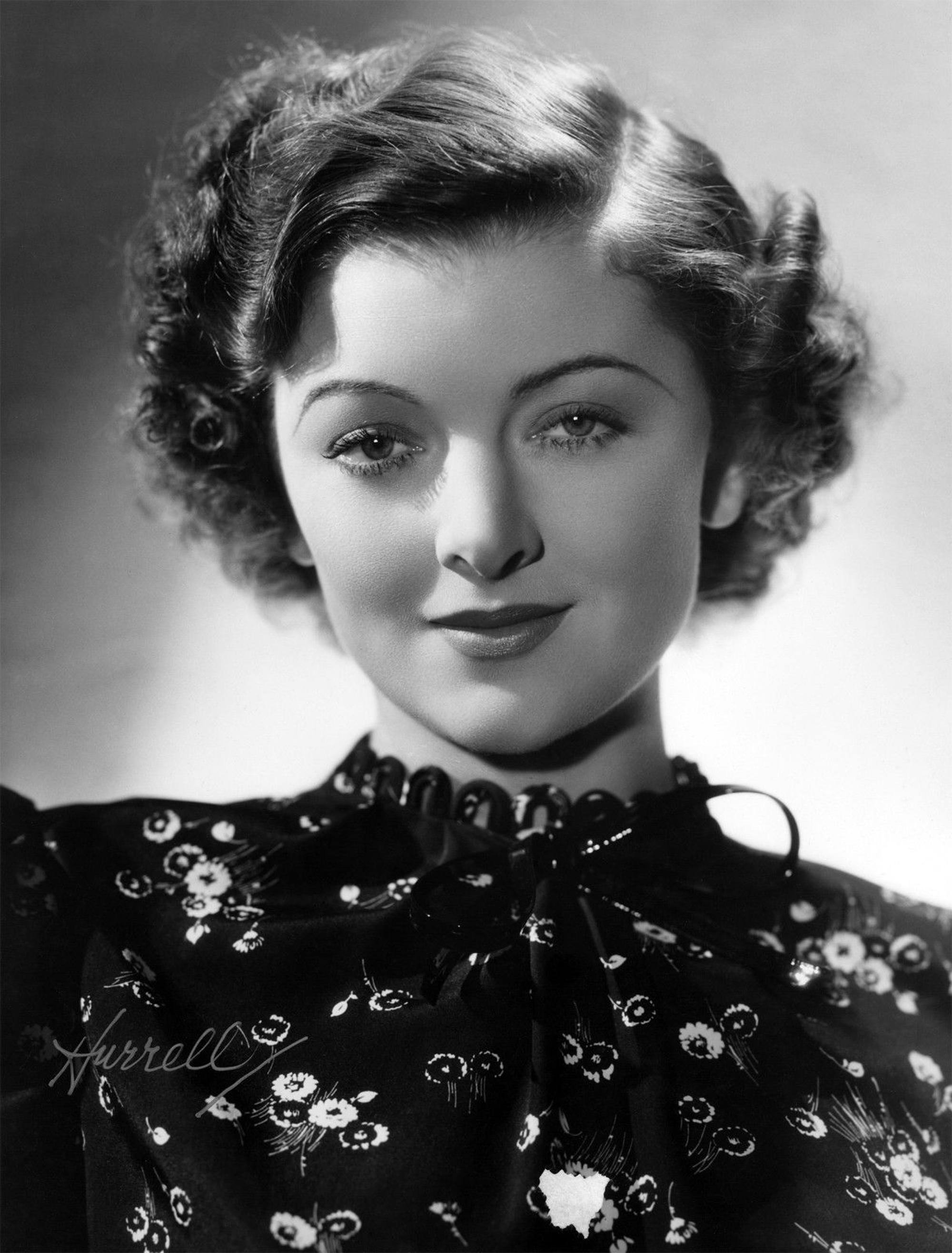
Myrna Loy

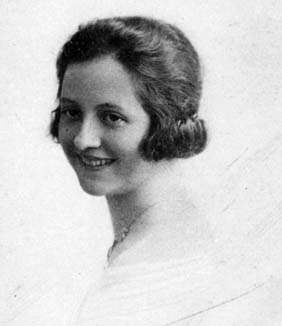
Marie-LouiseDubreil-Jacotin

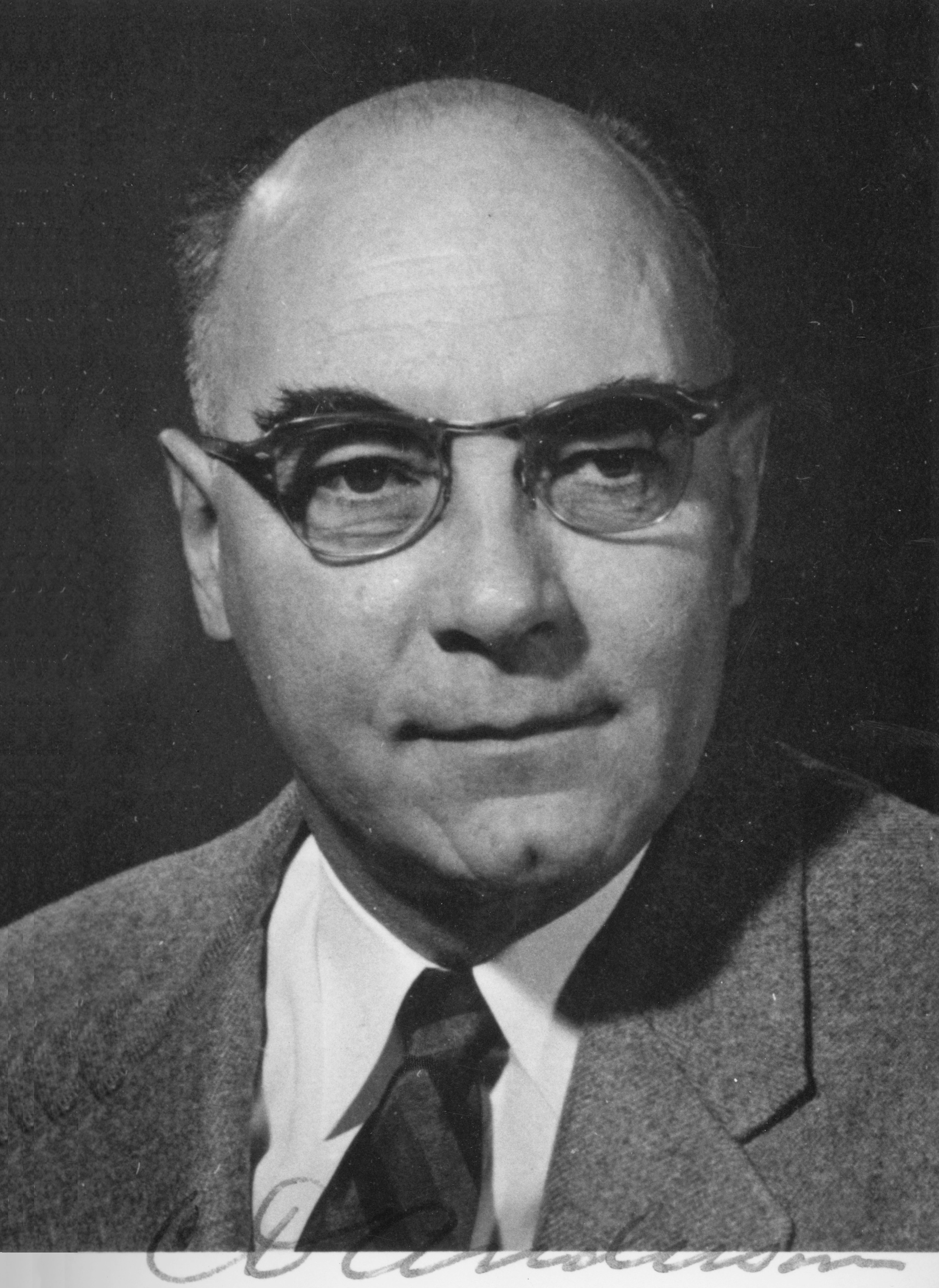
Carl David Anderson

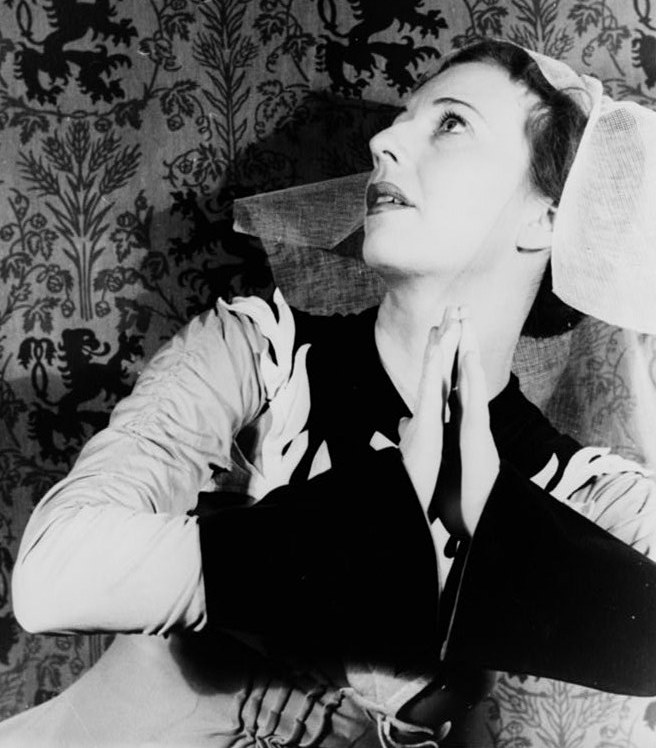
Agnes de Mille

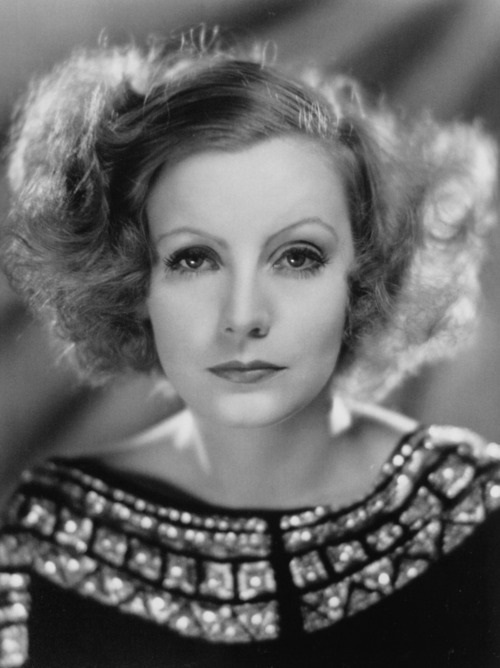
Greta Garbo

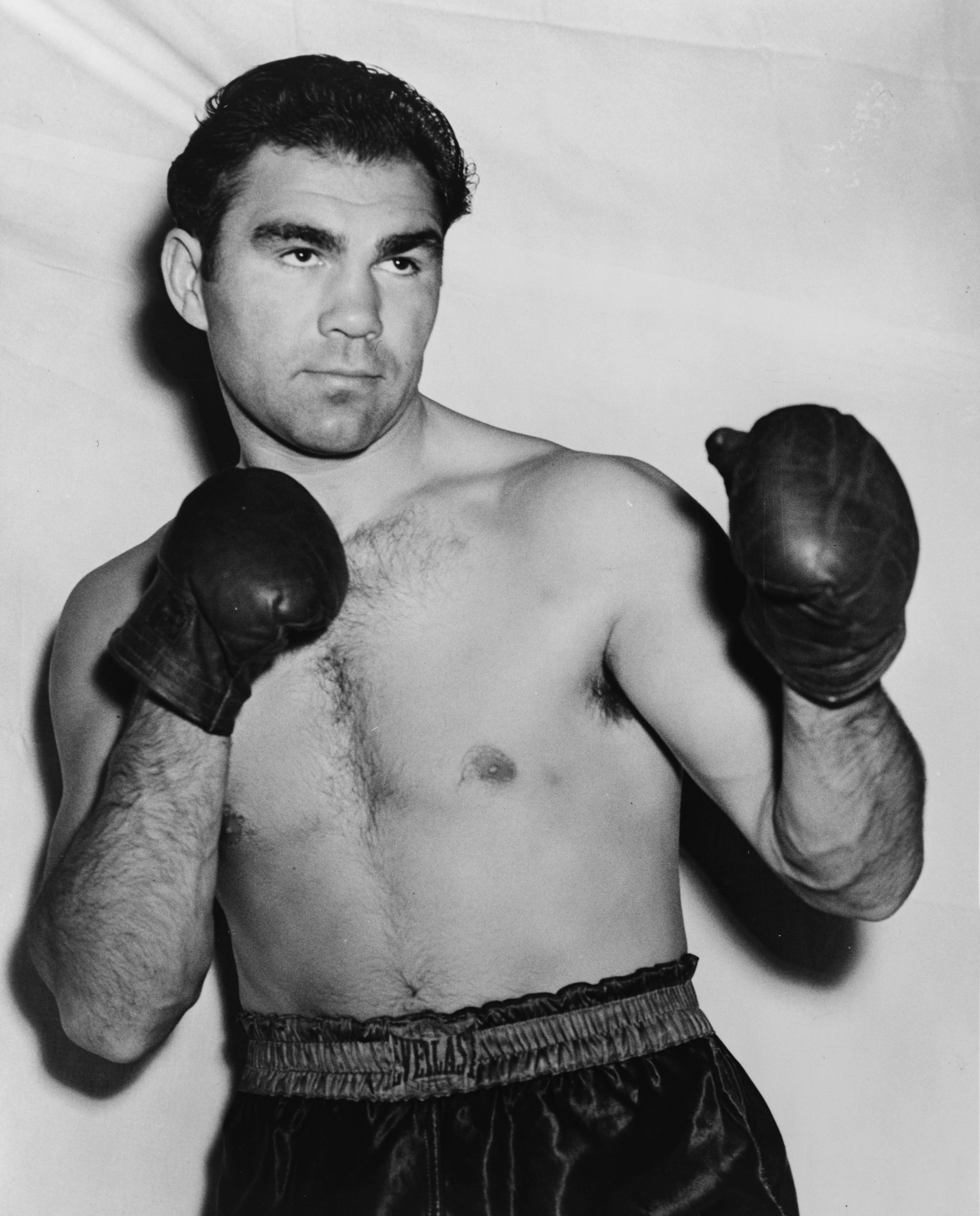
Max Schmeling

- July 2 – Eugene E. Lindsey, United States Navy officer (d. 1942)
- July 3 – Johnny Gibson, American Olympic runner (d. 2006)
- July 4
  - Lionel Trilling, American literary critic, short story writer, essayist and teacher (d. 1975)
  - Ian Aird, Scottish surgeon (d. 1962)
- July 5 – Jock Cameron, South African cricketer (d. 1935)
- July 6 – Suzanne Spaak, Belgian-born anti-Nazi resistance worker (k. 1944)
- July 7 - Marie-Louise Dubreil-Jacotin, French mathematician (d. 1972)
- July 8 – Leonid Amalrik, Russian animator (d. 1997)
- July 10 – Mildred Benson, American journalist and writer (d. 2002)
- July 11 – Kikutaro Baba, Japanese malacologist (d. 2000)
- July 12 – Prince John of the United Kingdom (d. 1919)
- July 13 – Alfredo M. Santos, Filipino general (d. 1990)
- July 14 – Laurence Chisholm Young, British mathematician (d. 2000)
- July 15 – Chaudhri Muhammad Ali, fourth prime minister of Pakistan (d. 1982)
- July 17 – William Gargan, American actor (d. 1979)
- July 19 – Giuseppe Girotti, Italian Roman Catholic priest and blessed (d. 1945)
- July 21 – David M. Kennedy, American politician, businessman (d. 1996)
- July 23 – Leopold Engleitner, Austrian Holocaust survivor (d. 2013)
- July 25 – Elias Canetti, Bulgarian-born British writer (d. 1994)
- July 29
  - Clara Bow, American film actress (d. 1965)
  - Dag Hammarskjöld, Swedish diplomat, 2nd Secretary-General of the United Nations (d. 1961)
- August 2
  - Franz König, Austrian Roman Catholic archbishop (d. 2004)
  - Myrna Loy, American actress (d. 1993)
  - Ruth Nelson, American actress (d. 1992)
- August 4 – Abeid Karume, 1st President of Zanzibar (assassinated) (d. 1972)
- August 8 – André Jolivet, French composer (d. 1974)
- August 9 – Leo Genn, English actor (d. 1978)
- August 11 – Erwin Chargaff, Austrian-born American biochemist (d. 2002)
- August 12 – Hans Urs von Balthasar, Swiss theologian and Catholic priest (d. 1988)
- August 13
  - Gareth Jones, Welsh journalist (d. 1935)
  - Anita Brenner, Mexican Jewish scholar and intellectual (d. 1974)
- August 16 – Marian Rejewski, Polish mathematician, cryptologist (d. 1980)
- August 17 – Newsboy Brown, American boxer (d. 1977)
- August 20
  - Jean Gebser, German-born Swiss author, linguist and poet (d. 1973)
  - Mikio Naruse, Japanese filmmaker (d. 1969)
- August 21 – Friz Freleng, American cartoon director (d. 1995).
- August 22 – John Lyng, Norwegian politician, prime minister (d. 1978)
- August 23 – Constant Lambert, British composer (d. 1951)
- August 24 – Siaka Stevens, President of Sierra Leone (d. 1988)
- August 25 – Faustina Kowalska, Polish "Secretary of Divine Mercy", saint (d. 1938)
- August 28 – Sam Levene, Russian-born American actor (d. 1980)
- August 29 – Dhyan Chand, Indian hockey player (d. 1979)
- August 31
  - Dore Schary, American film writer, director and producer (d. 1980)
  - Robert Bacher, American nuclear physicist (d. 2004)
- September 1
  - Chau Sen Cocsal Chhum, Cambodian politician, prime minister (d. 2009)
  - Father Chrysanthus, Dutch arachnologist (d. 1972)
- September 3 – Carl David Anderson, American physicist, Nobel Prize laureate (d. 1991)
- September 5 – Arthur Koestler, Hungarian-born British novelist and social philosopher (d. 1983)
- September 10 – Ibrahim Biçakçiu, Albanian politician, 2-time Prime Minister of Albania (d. 1977)
- September 12 – Ali Amini, Iranian politician, 67th Prime Minister of Iran (d. 1992)
- September 18
  - Eddie "Rochester" Anderson, African-American actor (d. 1977)
  - Agnes de Mille, American choreographer (d. 1993)
  - Greta Garbo, Swedish actress (d. 1990)
- September 19 – Judith Auer, German World War II resistance fighter (d. 1944)
- September 22
  - Haakon Lie, Norwegian politician (d. 2009)
  - Eugen Sänger, Austrian aerospace engineer (d. 1964)
- September 24 – Severo Ochoa, Spanish–American biochemist, Nobel Prize laureate (d. 1993)
- September 28 – Max Schmeling, German boxer (d. 2005)
- September 30
  - Savitri Devi, Greek writer, National Socialist philosopher (d. 1982)
  - Nevill Mott, English physicist, Nobel Prize laureate (d. 1996)
  - Michael Powell, English film director (d. 1990)

=== October – December ===
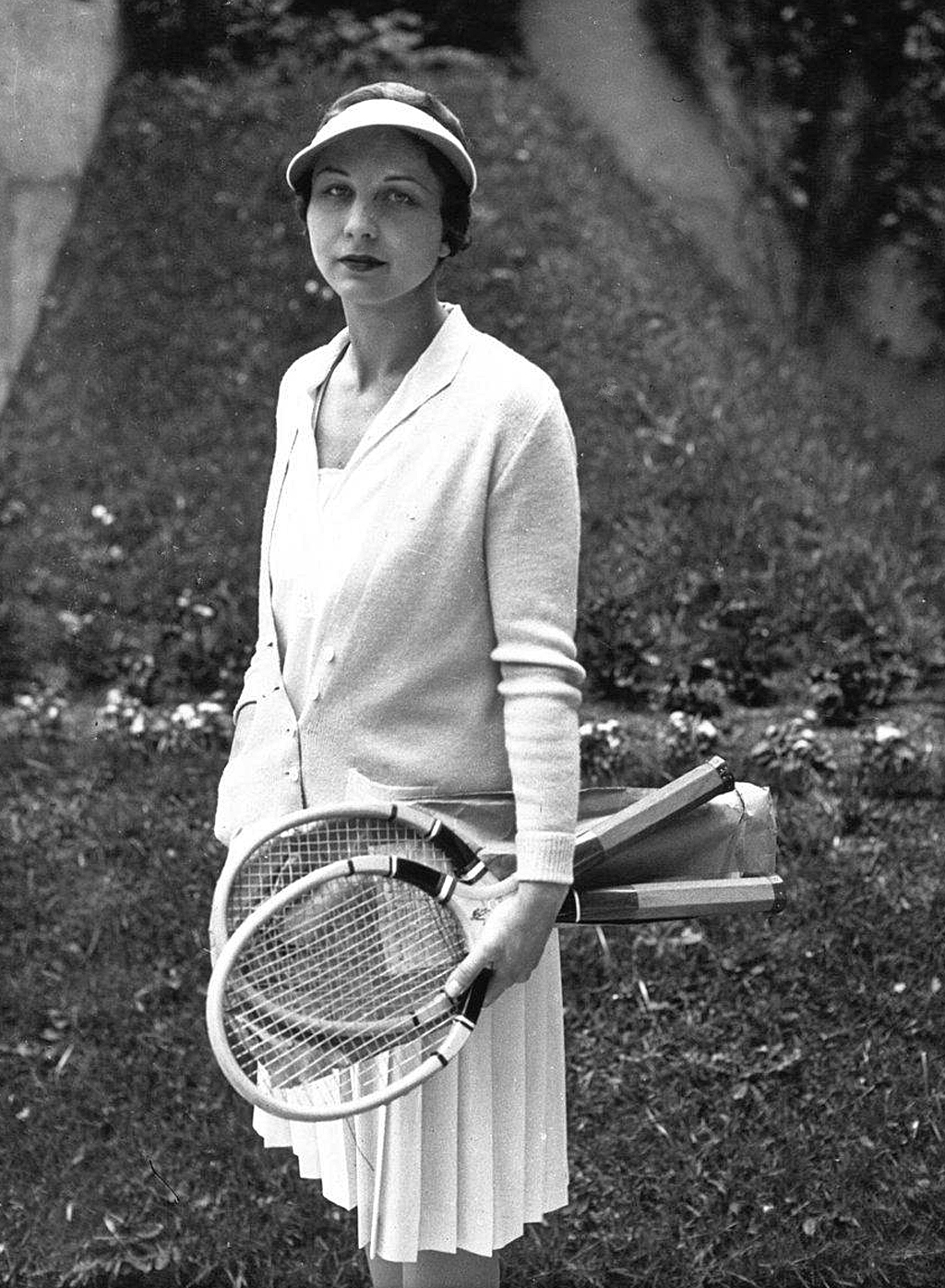
Helen Wills

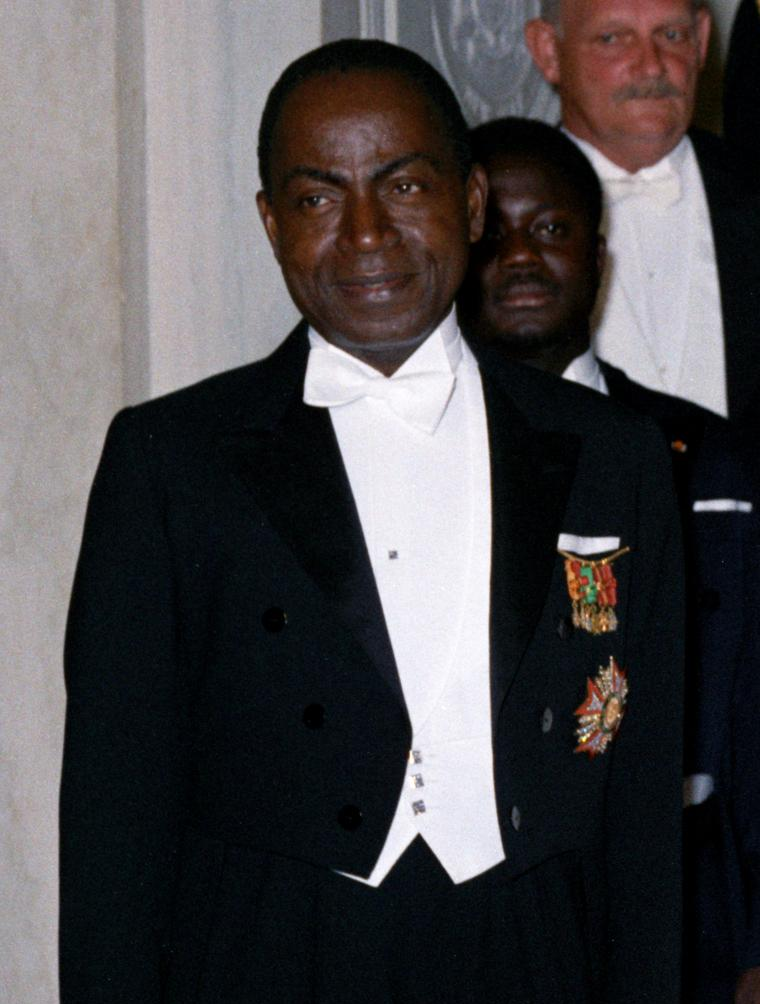
Félix Houphouët-Boigny

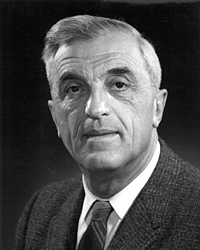
Felix Bloch

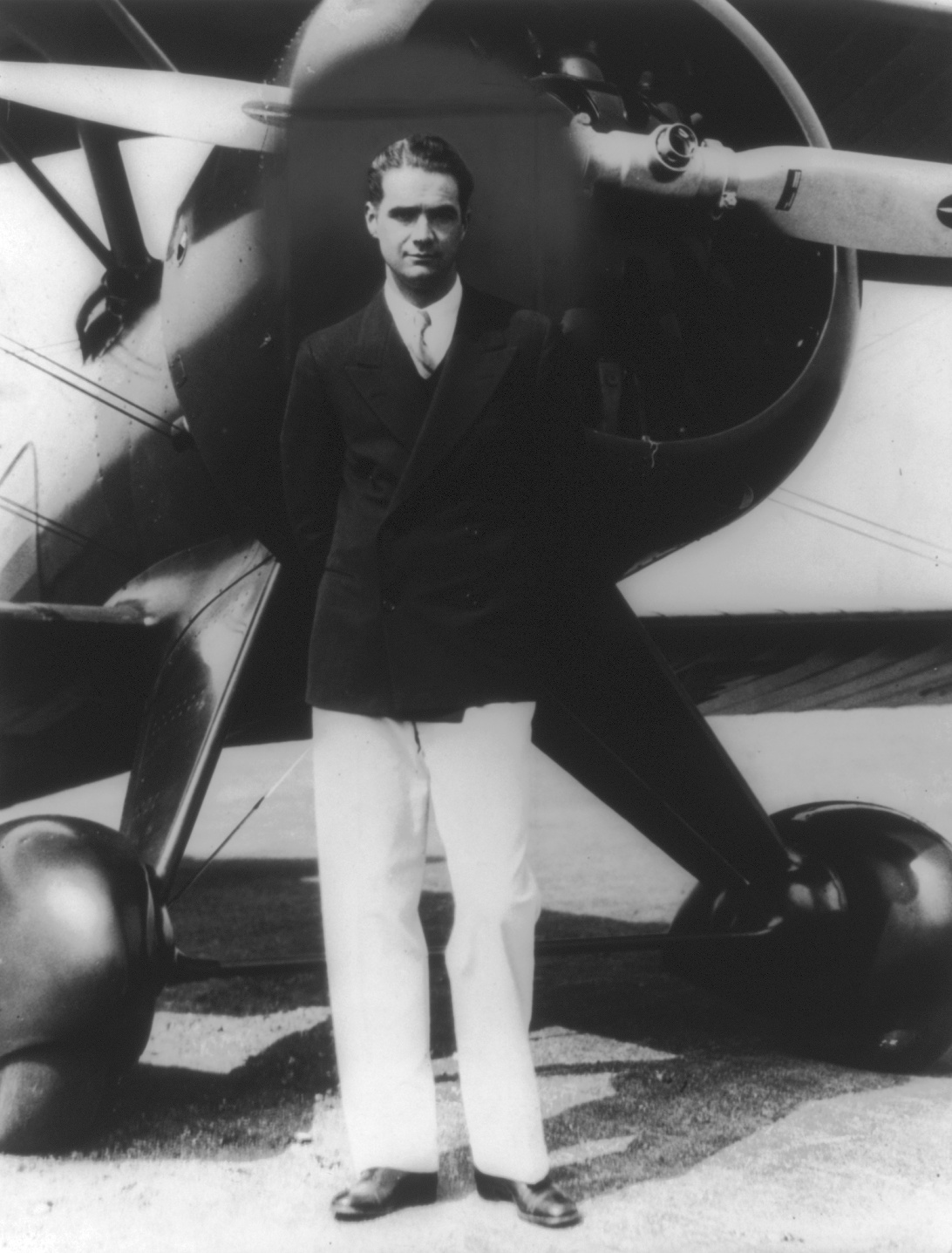
Howard Hughes

- October 3 – Caroline Brady, American philologist (d. 1980)
- October 6 – Helen Wills, American tennis player (d. 1998)
- October 7 – Andy Devine, American character actor (d. 1977)
- October 11 – Fred Trump, American real estate developer (d. 1999)
- October 13 – John Rinehart Blue, American military officer, educator, businessperson and politician (d. 1965)
- October 15 – C. P. Snow, English novelist (d. 1980)
- October 16 – Jadwiga Szubartowicz, Polish supercentenarian (d. 2017)
- October 18 – Félix Houphouët-Boigny, President of Ivory Coast (d. 1993)
- October 23
  - Felix Bloch, Swiss-born physicist, Nobel Prize laureate (d. 1983)
  - Yen Chia-kan, 2nd President of the Republic of China (d. 1993)
- October 29 – Berthold Wolpe, German-born British calligrapher, typographer and illustrator (d. 1989)
- October 31 – Harry Harlow, American psychologist (d. 1981)
- November 2 – Isobel Andrews, Scottish-born New Zealand writer (d. 1990)
- November 3 – Lois Mailou Jones, African-American artist (d. 1998)
- November 7 – William Alwyn, English composer (d. 1985)
- November 9 – Erika Mann, German author, war correspondent (d. 1969)
- November 15 – Mantovani, Italian-born conductor, arranger (d. 1980)
- November 17
  - Queen Astrid of Belgium (d. 1935)
  - Mischa Auer, Russian-American actor (d. 1967)
- November 19
  - Tommy Dorsey, American bandleader (d. 1956)
  - Eleanor Audley, American actress (d. 1991)
- November 30 – Ivor Bulmer-Thomas, British journalist and scientific writer (d. 1993)
- December 2 – Khan Bahadur Abdul Hakim, Bangladeshi mathematician (d. 1985)
- December 5
  - Frank Pakenham, 7th Earl of Longford, British peer, politician and reformer (d. 2001)
  - Otto Preminger, Austrian-born American film director (d. 1986)
  - Sheikh Abdullah, Indian politician (d. 1982)
- December 7 – Gerard Kuiper, Dutch astronomer (d. 1973)
- December 8 – Frank Faylen, American actor (d. 1985)
- December 11 – Gilbert Roland, Mexican-born American actor (d. 1994)
- December 12 – Mulk Raj Anand, Indian writer (d. 2004)
- December 17
  - Simo Häyhä, Finnish sniper (d. 2002)
  - Virginia Cutler, American academic (d. 1993)
- December 21 – Anthony Powell, British author (d. 2000)
- December 24 – Howard Hughes, American millionaire, aviation pioneer and film mogul (d. 1976)
- December 27 – Cliff Arquette (Charley Weaver), American comic (d. 1974)
- December 31 – Jule Styne, English-born American composer (d. 1994)

== Deaths ==
=== January–February ===
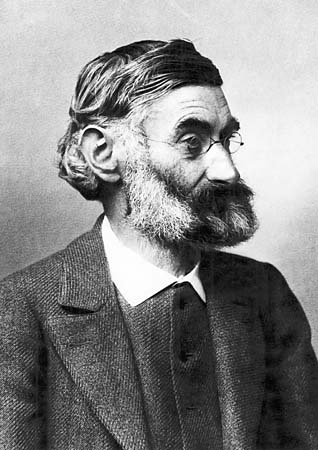
Ernst Abbe

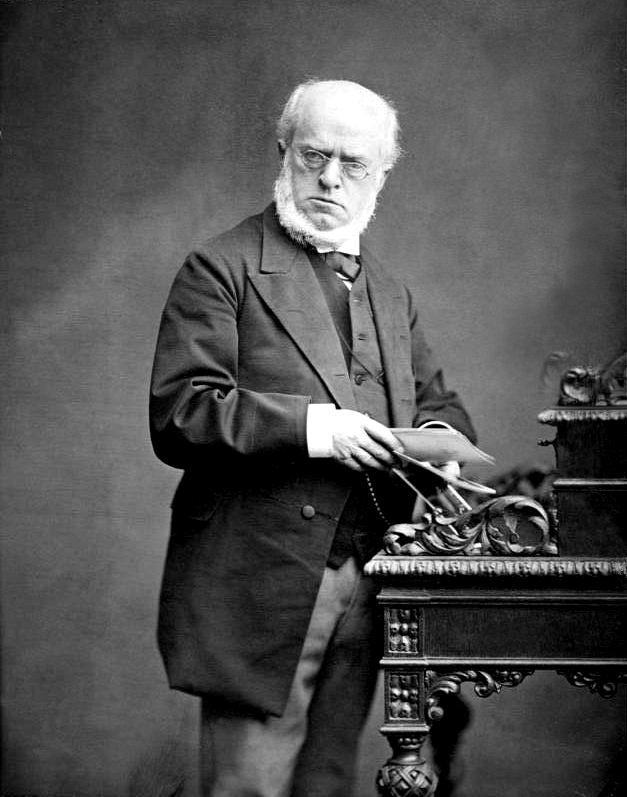
Adolph von Menzel

- January 1
  - Johannes Ludovicus Paquay, Belgian Roman Catholic priest and blessed (b. 1828)
- January 2 – Clara Augusta Jones Trask, American dime novelist (b. 1839)
- January 6
  - José María Gabriel y Galán, Spanish poet (b. 1870)
  - Ann Eliza Smith, American patriot (b. 1819)
- January 9 – Louise Michel, French anarchist (b. 1830)
- January 11 – Yehudah Aryeh Leib Alter, Polish Hasidic rabbi (b. 1847)
- January 14 – Ernst Abbe, German physicist (b. 1840)
- January 19 – Debendranath Tagore, Indian philosopher (b. 1817)
- January 20 – Gyula Szapáry, 10th Prime Minister of Hungary (b. 1832)
- January 22
  - Ștefan Fălcoianu, Romanian general and politician (b. 1835)
  - Clara Harrison Stranahan, American college co-founder and trustee (b. 1831)
- January 27 – Watson Heston, American cartoonist (b. 1846)
- January 31 – Konstantin Savitsky, Russian painter (b. 1844)
- February 2 –Mabel Cahill, Irish tennis champion (b. 1863)
- February 3 – Adolf Bastian, German anthropologist (b. 1826)
- February 4 – Louis-Ernest Barrias, French sculptor (b. 1841)
- February 5 – Andrijica Šimić, Croatian hajduk (b. 1833)
- February 8 – John Leary, American businessman, politician, and civic leader (b. 1837)
- February 9 – Adolph von Menzel, German painter (b. 1815)
- February 12 – Marcel Schwob, French writer (b. 1867)
- February 15 – Lew Wallace, American writer (Ben-Hur: A Tale of the Christ) (b. 1827)
- February 16 – Jay Cooke, American financier (b. 1821)
- February 17 – Grand Duke Sergei Alexandrovich of Russia (b. 1857)
- February 19 – Benjamin Harris Babbidge, Australian politician, 19th Mayor of Brisbane (b. 1836)
- February 20 – Jeremiah W. Farnham, American merchant captain (b. c. 1828)
- February 24 – Fanny Cochrane Smith, Aboriginal Tasmanian (b. 1834)
- February 25 – Edward Cooper, 83rd Mayor of New York City (b. 1824)

=== March–April ===
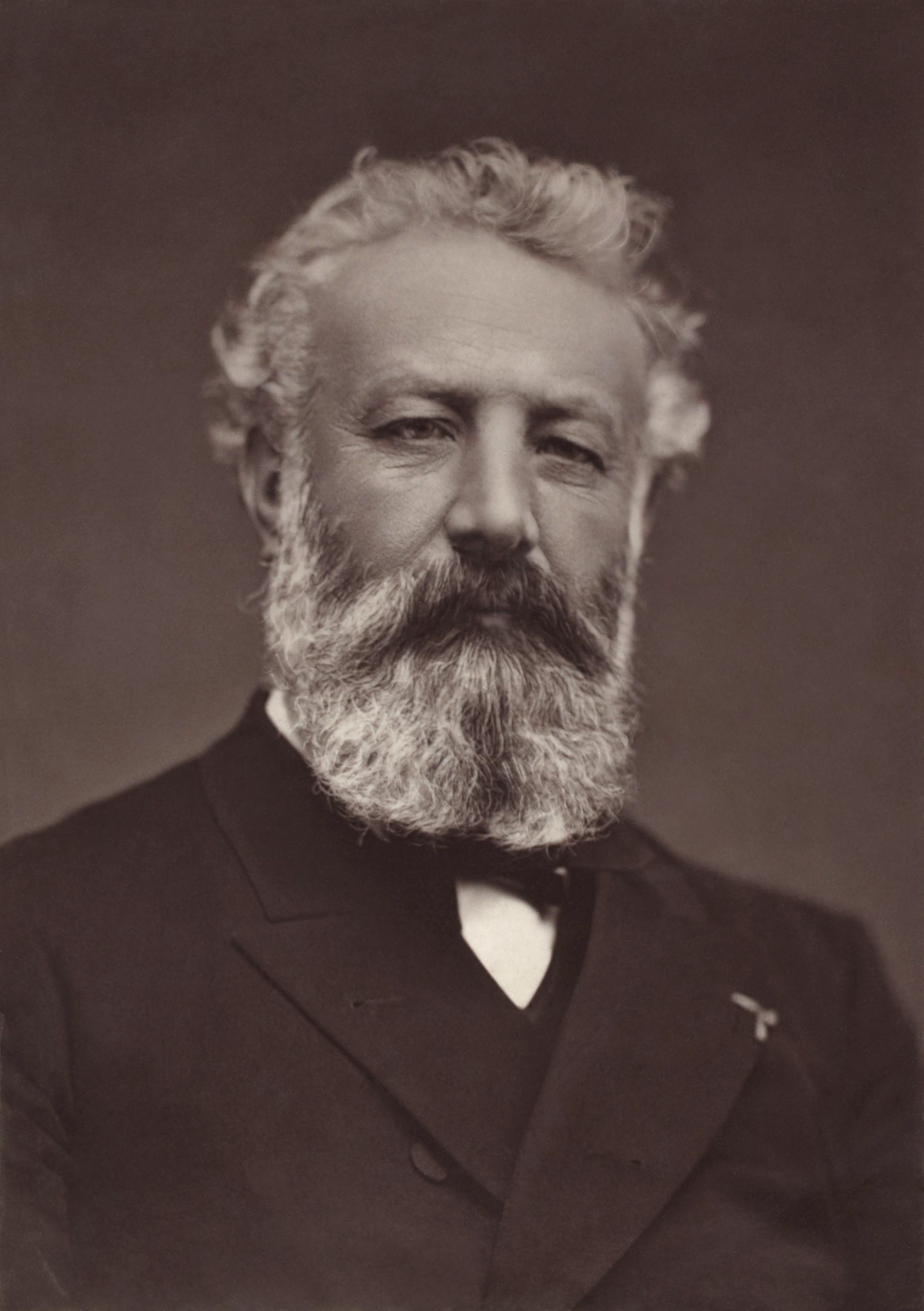
Jules Verne

- March 1 – Jean-Baptiste Claude Eugène Guillaume, French sculptor (b. 1822)
- March 3 – Antonio Annetto Caruana, Maltese archaeologist, author (b. 1830)
- March 6
  - Pierre Théoma Boisrond-Canal, 12th President of Haiti (b. 1832)
  - John Henninger Reagan, American Confederate politician (b. 1818)
- March 13 – Nil Izvorov, Bulgarian Orthodox priest and venerable (b. 1823)
- March 15
  - Meyer Guggenheim, Swiss-born patriarch of the Guggenheim Family (b. 1828)
  - Amalie Skram, Norwegian author, feminist (b. 1846)
- March 17 – Juan Nepomuceno Zegrí Moreno, Spanish Roman Catholic priest and blessed (b. 1831)
- March 23 – Martha E. Cram Bates, American journalist (b. 1839)
- March 24 – Jules Verne, French science fiction author (Twenty Thousand Leagues Under the Seas) (b. 1828)
- March 25 – Maurice Barrymore, British actor (b. 1849)
- March 28 – Huang Zunxian, Chinese poet, writer (b. 1848)
- April 4 – Constantin Meunier, Belgian painter and sculptor (b. 1831)
- April 7 – Maria Assunta Pallotta, Italian Roman Catholic religious professed and blessed (b. 1878)
- April 9 – Frederic Thesiger, 2nd Baron Chelmsford, British general (b. 1827)
- April 18 – Juan Valera y Alcalá-Galiano, Spanish writer (b. 1824)
- April 23 – Joseph Jefferson, American actor (b. 1829)

=== May–June ===
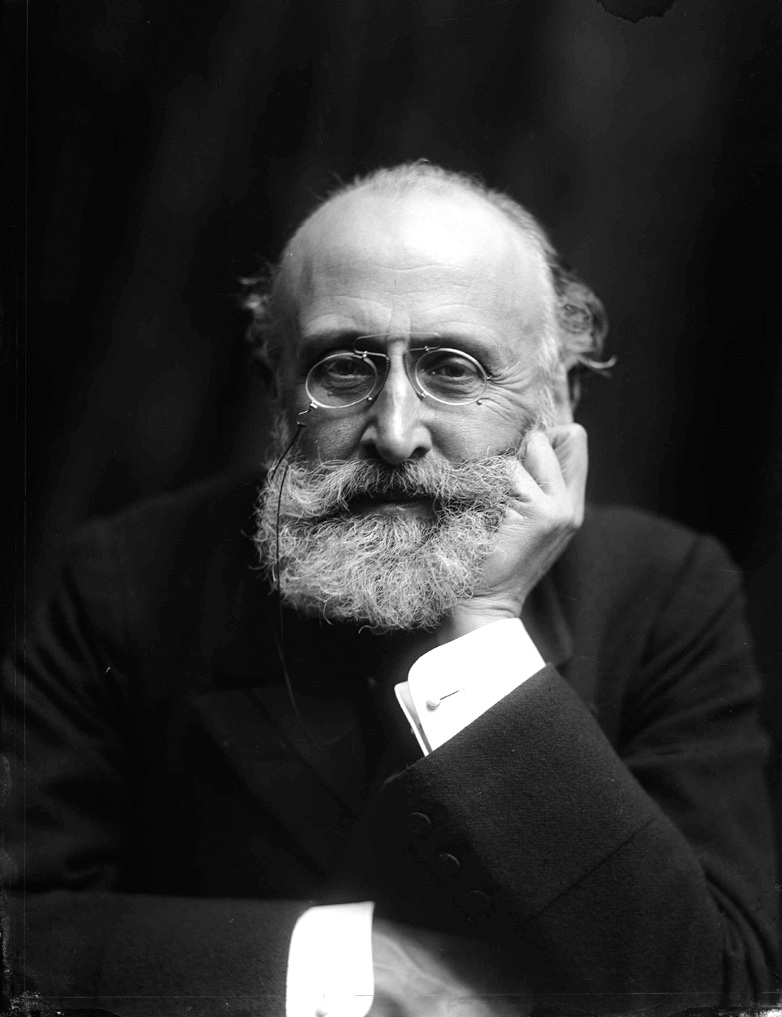
Francisco Silvela

Giovanni Battista Scalabrini

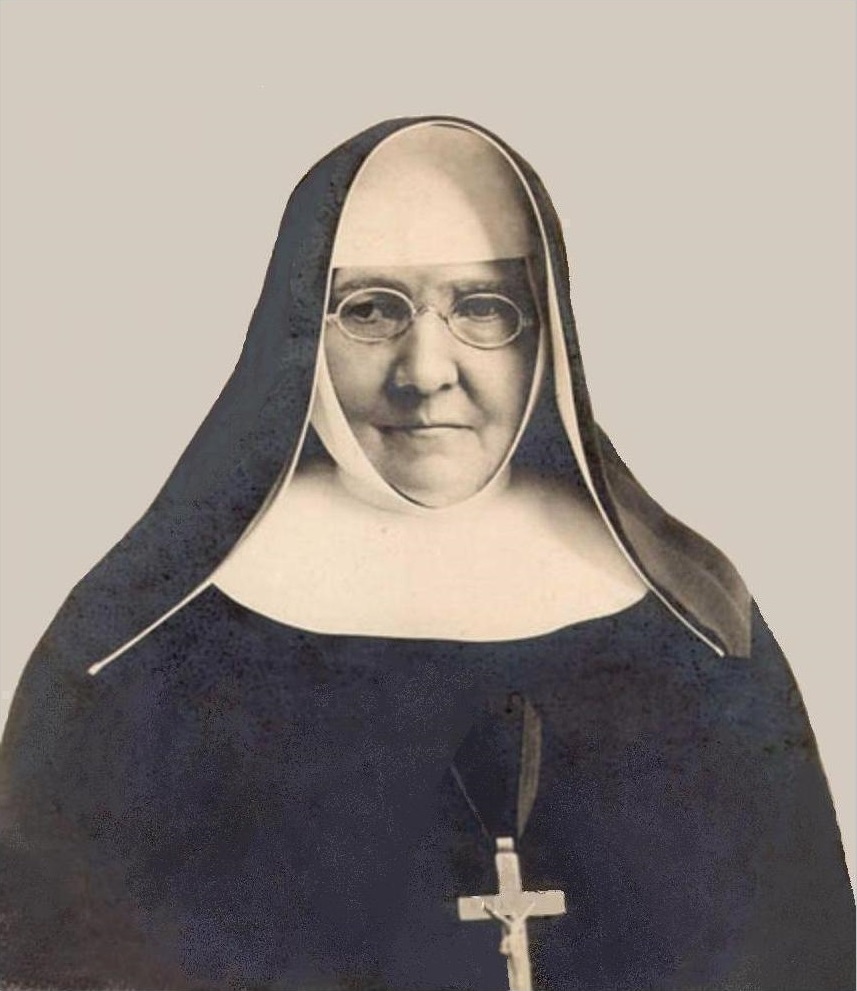
Małgorzata Szewczyk

- May 11
  - Andrzej Jerzy Mniszech, Polish painter (b. 1823)
  - Ceferino Namuncurá, Argentine Roman Catholic lay brother and blessed (b. 1886)
- May 13 – Sam S. Shubert, American theater owner (b. 1878)
- May 14 – Jessie Bartlett Davis, American actress and singer (b. 1860)
- May 23 – Mary Livermore, American advocate of women's rights (b. 1820)
- May 26 – Alphonse James de Rothschild, French banker, philanthropist (b. 1827)
- May 28 – Emanuel Willis Wilson, West Virginia governor (b. 1844)
- May 29 – Francisco Silvela, Spanish politician, Prime Minister (b. 1843)
- June 1
  - Émile Delahaye, French automotive pioneer (b. 1843)
  - Giovanni Battista Scalabrini, Italian Roman Catholic prelate and blessed (b. 1839)
- June 3 – James Hudson Taylor, British missionary (b. 1832)
- June 4 – Jan Mikulicz-Radecki, Polish-Austrian surgeon (b. 1850)
- June 5 – Małgorzata Szewczyk, Polish Roman Catholic religious professed and blessed (b. 1828)
- June 7 – Carl Kellner, Austrian mystic (b. 1851)
- June 13 – Theodoros Deligiannis, 5-time Prime Minister of Greece (assassinated) (b. 1820)
- June 17 – Máximo Gómez, Cuban general (b. 1836)
- June 18
  - Carmine Crocco, Italian brigand (b. 1830)
  - Per Teodor Cleve, Swedish chemist and geologist (b. 1840)
- June 22 – Francis Lubbock, Governor of Texas (b. 1815)
- June 27 – Grigory Vakulinchuk, Russian mutineer (b. 1877)

=== July–August ===
- July 1 – John Hay, American diplomat, private secretary to Abraham Lincoln (b. 1838)
- July 4 – Élisée Reclus, French geographer and anarchist (b. 1830)
- July 8 – Walter Kittredge, American musician and composer (b. 1834)
- July 11 – Muhammad Abduh, Egyptian philosopher, jurist (b. 1849)
- July 15 – Raimundo Fernández-Villaverde, 28th Prime Minister of Spain (b. 1848)
- July 30 – Gioacchino La Lomia, Italian Roman Catholic priest and venerable (b. 1831)
- August 1 – John Brown, Canadian politician (b. 1841)
- August 4
  - Walther Flemming, German biologist (b. 1843)
  - Kinjikitile Ngwale, Tanzanian rebel leader
- August 14 – Simeon Solomon, British artist (b. 1840)
- August 21 – Mary Mapes Dodge, American author of children's literature (b. 1831)
- August 31 – Francesco Tamagno, Italian opera singer (b. 1850)

=== September–October ===
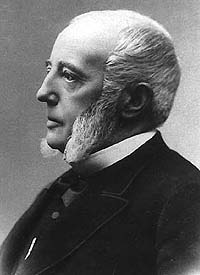
Rene Goblet

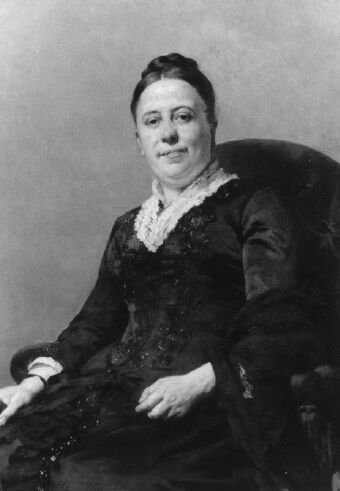
Isabelle Gatti de Gamond

- September 5 – Touch the Clouds, Minneconjou chief (b. c. 1838)
- September 13 – René Goblet, French politician, 52nd Prime Minister of France (b. 1828)
- September 14 – Pierre Savorgnan de Brazza, Franco-Italian explorer (b. 1852)
- September 18 – George MacDonald, Scottish author, poet and Christian minister (b. 1824)
- September 19 – Thomas John Barnardo, Irish philanthropist (b. 1845)
- October 3 – José-Maria de Heredia, French poet (b. 1842)
- October 6 – Ferdinand von Richthofen, German explorer and geographer (b. 1833)
- October 11 – Isabelle Gatti de Gamond, Belgian educationalist and feminist (b. 1839)
- October 13 – Sir Henry Irving, English actor (b. 1838)
- October 15 – Mikhail Dragomirov, Russian general (b. 1830)
- October 29 – Étienne Desmarteau, Canadian athlete (b. 1873)

=== November–December ===
- November 2 – Albert von Kölliker, Swiss anatomist (b. 1817)
- November 9 – William Parrott, British coalminer (b. 1843)
- November 14 – Robert Whitehead, British engineer and inventor (b. 1823)
- November 17
  - Adolphe, Grand Duke of Luxembourg (b. 1817)
  - Prince Philippe, Count of Flanders (b. 1837)
- November 22 – Viktor Sakharov, Russian general (assassinated) (b. 1848)
- December 5 – Henry Eckford, British horticulturist (b. 1823)
- December 9
  - Henry Holmes, British composer, violinist (b. 1839)
  - Sir Richard Claverhouse Jebb, British scholar, politician (b. 1841)

=== Date unknown ===
- Abdul Wahid Bengali, Muslim theologian and teacher (b. 1850)
- Mary Thomas, West Indian labor leader (b. 1848)

== Nobel Prizes ==

- Physics – Philipp Eduard Anton von Lenard
- Chemistry – Johann Friedrich Wilhelm Adolf von Baeyer
- Medicine – Robert Koch
- Literature – Henryk Sienkiewicz
- Peace – Bertha von Suttner
