= Johannes Ludovicus Paquay =

Belgian Roman Catholic priest (1828–1905)

Blessed Johannes Ludovicus Paquay OFM
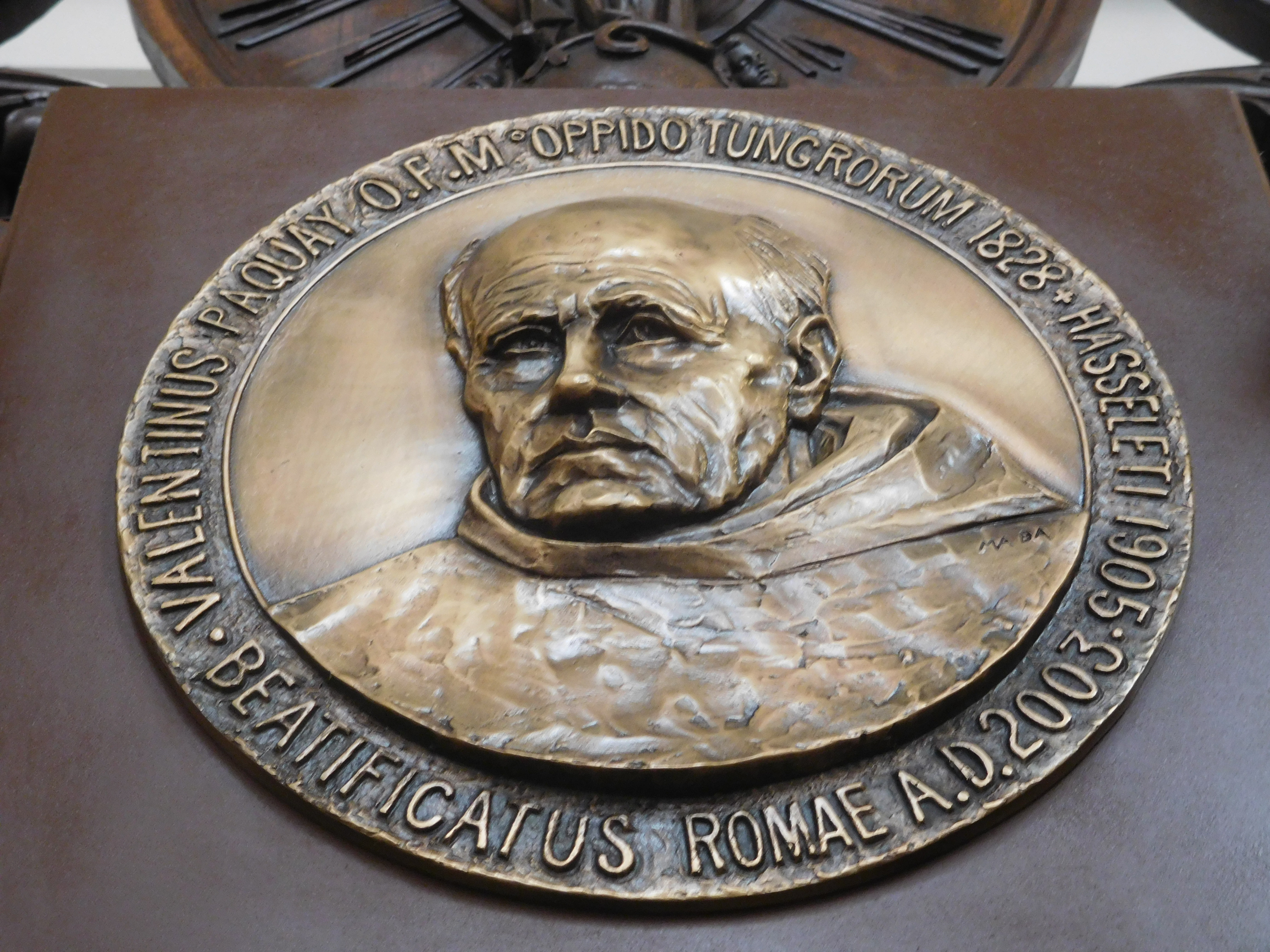
- Born: 17 November 1828; Tongeren, Limburg, United Kingdom of the Netherlands
- Died: 1 January 1905 (aged 76); Hasselt, Limburg, Belgium
- Venerated in: Roman Catholic Church
- Beatified: 9 November 2003, Saint Peter's Square, Vatican City by Pope John Paul II
- Feast: 1 January

Johannes Ludovicus Paquay (17 November 1828 – 1 January 1905), also known as Valentinus Paquay, was a Belgian Catholic priest from the Order of Friars Minor. He was a popular confessor and noted preacher while serving in various leadership positions in the house he was stationed in; he was also known for his popular devotion to the Eucharist and the Sacred Heart and promoted these devotions to the faithful and to his conferees alike.

Pope John Paul II beatified him in Saint Peter's Square on 9 November 2003.

== Life ==
Johannes Ludovicus Paquay was born in Belgium on 17 November 1828 as the fifth of eleven children to Hendrik Paquay and Anne Neven.

He studied literature at the college in Tongeren — the Canons Regular of Saint Augustine managed it — and commenced his studies for the priesthood at Saint-Trond in 1845. But his father died in an unexpected twist in 1847 and he left school in order to join the Order of Friars Minor and he commenced his novitiate in Thielt on 3 October 1849. He made his perpetual profession on 4 October 1850 in the new religious name of "Valentinus" and made his profession into the hands of Father Ugoline Demont who was the head of that convent. Paquay later resumed his studies after this and was ordained to the priesthood on 10 June 1854. He was at once assigned to the Hasselt convent where he was stationed for the remainder of his life and there served as both sub-prior and prior of that house. Paquay served as the provincial definitor from 1890 until 1899 and soon became a sought after confessor and spiritual director.

The priest became noted for his ardent devotion to the Eucharist and he often prompted to his parishioners the importance of the frequent reception of the Eucharist while likewise promoting to the faithful the devotion of the Sacred Heart as well as to his fellow friars.

He died in 1905.

== Beatification ==
The beatification process commenced in Liège in an informative process that opened in 1908 and later closed in 1910. Theologians compiled his spiritual writings and approved them to be in line with doctrine on 25 February 1920; the formal introduction to the cause came under Pope Pius XI on 22 November 1922, and Paquay was titled as a Servant of God. An apostolic process was later held from 1925 until 1926. Both processes received the validation of the Congregation of Rites on 19 July 1939. An antepreparatory congregation approved the cause on 8 May 1956 as did a preparatory one on 4 July 1967 which led to a general congregation likewise approving it on 14 July 1967; a session of the newly established Congregation for the Causes of Saints approved the cause on 8 May 1969.

The late priest was named as Venerable on 4 May 1970 after Pope Paul VI approved that the Franciscan friar had led a model life of heroic virtue. The single miracle required for beatification was investigated from 1952 to 1953 and was validated on 20 October 2000 before receiving the approval of a medical board on 18 April 2002. Theologians also approved it on 12 November 2002 as did the C.C.S. on 10 December 2002 before Pope John Paul II granted final approval for it on 20 December 2002. This allowed for the pope to celebrate his beatification on 9 November 2003 in Saint Peter's Square.

The current postulator for this cause is Fra Giovangiuseppe Califano.

== Publications ==
- Remaclus Moonen, O.F.M., "Het leven van p. Valentinus Paquay", 1912, 12th ed. Hasselt 1991.
