= Jadwiga Szubartowicz =

Polish supercentenarian

- Born: Jadwiga Skawińska; 16 October 1905; Lublin, Poland
- Died: 20 July 2017 (aged 111); Lublin, Poland
- Occupation: Accountant
- Known for: being a supercentenarian

Jadwiga Szubartowicz (née Skawińska; 16 October 1905 – 20 July 2017) was a Polish supercentenarian. She was the oldest Polish person alive between 1 August 2015 and 20 June 2017.

== Biography ==
Szubartowicz was born on 16 October 1905 in Lublin. During her childhood, she lived for a few years in Russia with her family. Living there, at the age of 12, she was a witness of the October Revolution, in Petersburg, then called Petrograd. Along with her sister, she was a graduate of Middle School of Sisters Ursulines and Education Studies. She worked as an accountant, and her sister for 40 years as a teacher in Lubartów.

During the Nazi occupation of Poland, her brother was arrested and sent home after a week spent in the Majdanek concentration camp, but later arrested again in Kraków. From there, he went to Buchenwald, where he died. Szubartowicz was a witness of the transportation of the painting Battle of Grunwald to hide it from the Germans. In 1952 she married Antoni Szubartowicz, a soldier and a veteran of Battle of Monte Casino.

On 1 August 2015, after the death of Jadwiga Młynek (1905–2015) from Kalisz, she became the oldest living Polish person. Her age was verified from research by the Gerontology Research Group, who sent wishes for her 110th birthday, on 16 October 2015. On 7 March 2017, to celebrate the Day of Women, the mayor of Lublin, Krysztof Żuk, presented her with a medal for the 700-year anniversary of establishment of the city.

Szubartowicz died on 20 July 2017, in a nursing home in Lublin. She was buried at a cemetery on Lipowa Street, in Lublin on 26 July 2017.
