= Assassination of Nikolay Bobrikov =

1904 murder in Helsinki, Finland

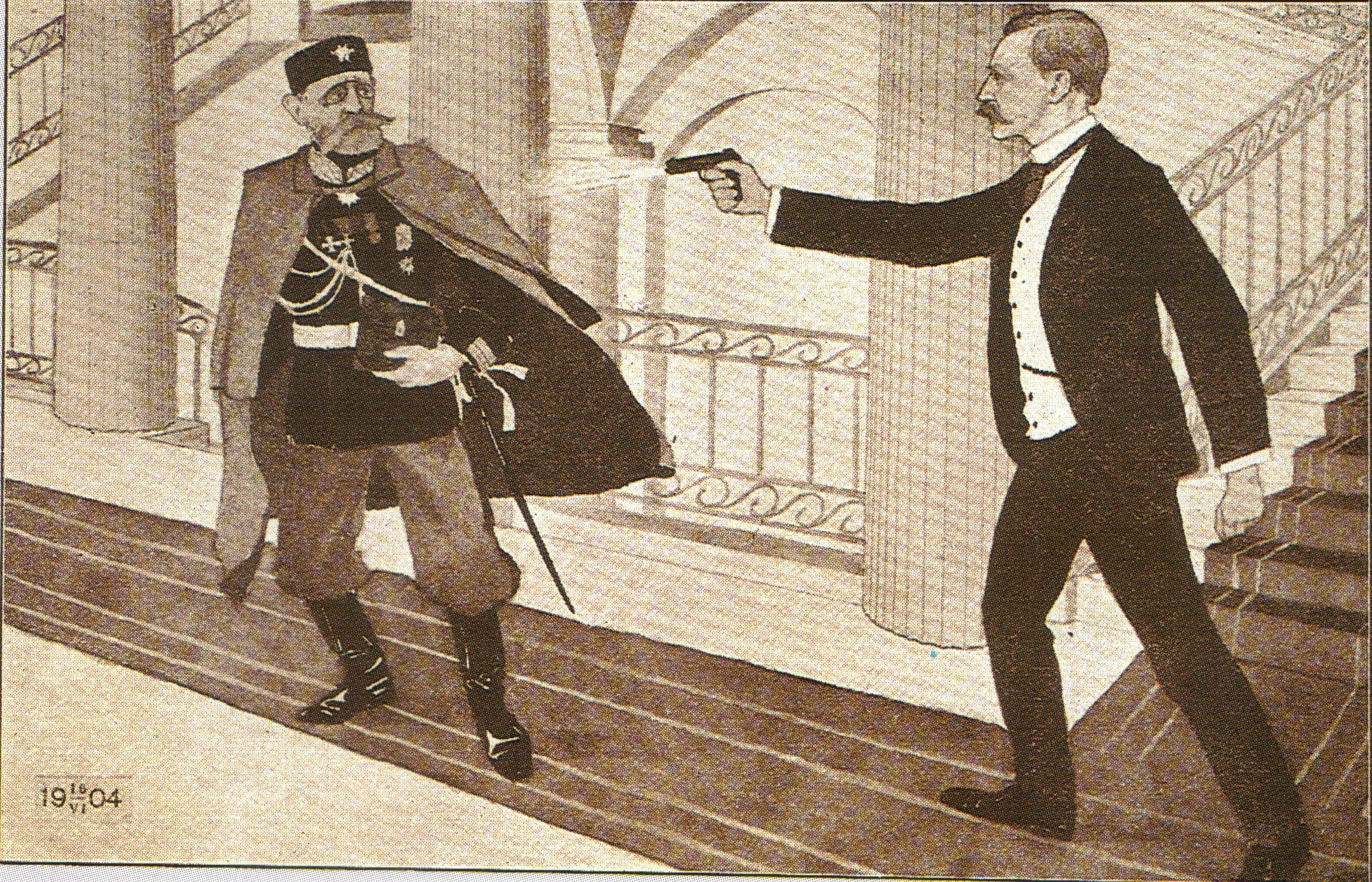
- A drawing by an unknown artist, depicting Schauman shooting Bobrikov.
- Location: Helsinki, Finland
- Date: 16 June 1904
- Target: Nikolay Bobrikov
- Weapon: Pistol
- Deaths: 2 (including the perpetrator)
- Perpetrator: Eugen Schauman
- Motive: Finnish nationalism

The assassination of Nikolay Bobrikov took place on 16 June [O.S. 3 June] 1904 when Finnish nationalist Eugen Schauman shot and killed the Governor-General of Finland, Nikolay Bobrikov, on a staircase in the Government Palace, which at the time was the main building of the Senate of Finland. After shooting Bobrikov, Schauman shot and killed himself. The assassination was seen by many Finns as an act of resistance against Russian oppression, with Schauman being considered a national hero.

== Background ==
Between 1809 and 1917, Finland was an autonomous grand duchy within the Russian Empire. From 1899, the Russian Tsar, Nicholas II, pursued a policy of Russification, aimed at eliminating Finland's political autonomy and relegating it to the same status as other provinces of the empire. In 1898, the Tsar appointed Nikolay Bobrikov as the Governor-General of Finland, with dictatorial powers to implement his policies. Bobrikov's first major act was the February Manifesto, which asserted the right of the imperial government to rule Finland without reference to the Finnish legislature. This was followed by the Language Manifesto, which mandated Russian as the official language of the administration and judiciary in Finland (but which allowed Finnish to continue to be used in the daily life of the people). Another of Bobrikov's initiatives was to make Finnish men liable for conscription into the Russian army.

Bobrikov's measures led to widespread resistance. Most of the resistance was peaceful, and included strikes, petitions and the evasion of military service. But a minority of Finns sought more violent action. Shooting clubs sprang up throughout the country, ostensibly to promote good marksmanship but in fact to serve as the basis for armed opposition.

Eugen Schauman, a Swedish-speaking Finnish civil servant and ardent nationalist, was a member of one such shooting club, although he claimed that he was not party to any conspiracy and that he acted alone.

== Plotting the assassination ==
Schauman had been plotting the assassination of Bobrikov for several months. In February 1904 he made a will, and also wrote a letter of apology to his father Waldemar Schauman. He gave his most important papers to his friends, and he wrote two letters to doctor Gunnar Castrén, to be opened only "when there is need for it". One was a personal letter to the doctor; the other was a long letter addressed directly to the Tsar. In both letters, Schauman explained his actions.

Schauman kept his plan secret, even from his family and friends. He was partly motivated by two crises in his personal life: his education and career had suffered because of an incurable hearing condition; and a woman he had loved for ten years had cold-heartedly left him. He had decided that by acting against Bobrikov, he could at least be of some benefit to his country. His action would also demonstrate his ability and decisiveness.

Schauman was not part of any activist group or movement, but was in contact with various groups and was aware of their plans to kill Bobrikov. The student Lennart Hohenthal, a member of the "Gummerus group" of activists led by Magister Herman Gummerus, contacted Schauman whom he knew for his bravery during a confrontation with Cossacks in a conscription protest in Helsinki two years earlier. After discussing the planned assassination with Schauman, Hohental agreed to give him until Midsummer to act; if he failed, the Gummerus group would put their own plan into action.

An important difference between the activists' plan and that of Schauman was that Schauman had no intention of escaping. The activists saw themselves as being in total war against Russia, and their aim was to avoid needless losses among their own numbers. Schauman, on the other hand, was prepared to take full responsibility for his actions by taking his own life after the murder. He expressed this in his letter to the Tsar:

It is terrible to take the life of another person. With my own life I will pay for my crime. As I have made this decision I have been at peace; calmly and happily I will go to my death.

=== Practicing for the assassination ===
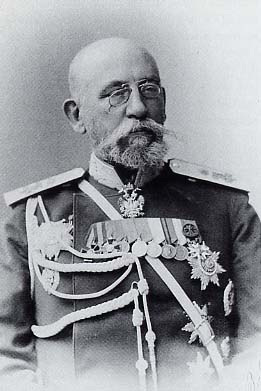
Nikolay Bobrikov, Governor-General of Finland.

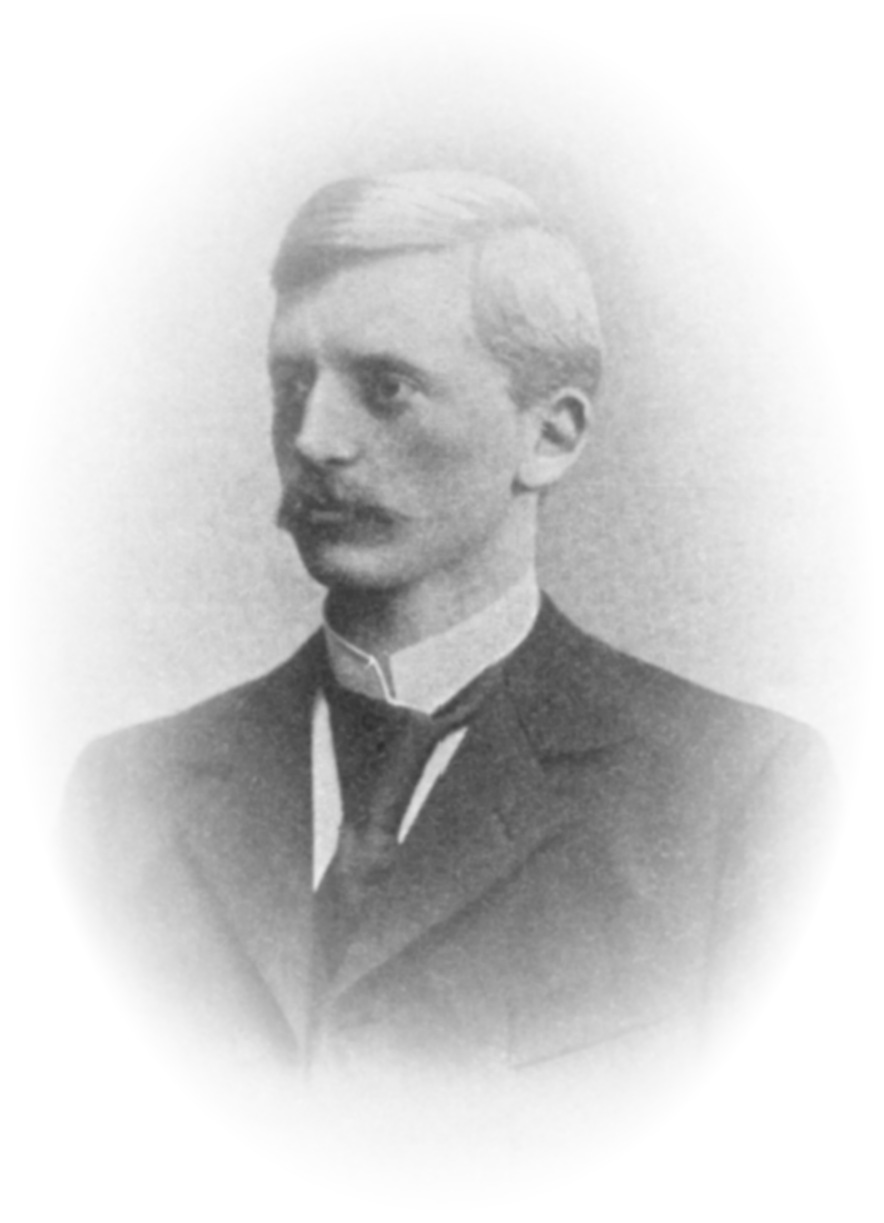
Eugen Schauman, the man who killed Nikolay Bobrikov.

[It is peaceful on the streets of Helsinki.] Understand my words: on the streets. One can never be certain about the houses in Helsinki.

— Bobrikov in an interview of Novoye Vremya a few days before his death

Schauman was thought to have used the 1902 murder of the former Russian Minister of Interior Dmitry Sipyagin as a base of his plan. Schauman's cousin, Mary Junnelius, was living in Saint Petersburg at the time, and was in the habit of sending him news of the city. This included a detailed account of Sipyagin's murder, which had been committed by a Russian student, Stepan Balmashov, disguised as a member of the Socialist Revolutionary Party. The murder had been discussed at the Schaumans' family home. Unlike his father, Eugen Schauman disliked the idea that the murderer should wear a disguise.

Schauman chose as the site of the assassination the main building of the Senate, where he had worked as a clerk and where he still enjoyed freedom of movement. He knew that Bobrikov conducted a session of the Economic Board of the Senate every Thursday morning at 11:00 am. He had originally intended to commit the murder on Thursday 9 June, but failed to gain entry into the building, thus delaying the plan by one week. The following Thursday would be the last before Bobrikov was due to start his summer vacation.

On Wednesday 15 June Schauman was practising marksmanship at the shooting range of the Finnish Hunting Association. He gave the young Edvard Ellman the job of moving a target with a picture of a bearded Russian, with a heart painted on his chest, along a piece of string. Schauman left the shooting range, satisfied with his ability to hit the target with his Browning FN M1900. Ellman asked him why he had chosen such a peculiar target, to which Schauman replied: "An enemy that stays still when being shot is not a good one!"

That Wednesday Schauman also met his friend, Walter Rydman, the leader of the Helsinki branch of the Kagal resistance movement, who was walking his dog in the Kaisaniemi district. The two friends sat on a bench and discussed Russian oppression. Rydman was angry with the public's perceived acceptance of the oppression and lack of resistance. He burst out: "There is hardly a man with enough courage to kill Bobrikov!" Schauman replied: "Yes there are such men. Just be calm!"

== Assassination ==
Early in the morning on Thursday 16 June, Schauman went for a walk at the Market Square with his dog Lucas. He then returned home to the economy school building where he was renting a room and ate breakfast at the school. After that he said an emotional goodbye to his dog Lucas.

At about 11:00 am on Thursday 16 June Bobrikov arrived at the Senate for the Economic Board session. He and his entourage walked through the Senate Square. Schauman was watching Bobrikov from a top-floor window. Bobrikov entered the building alone, and started walking slowly up the stairs. He was wearing his uniform and a military overcoat, and was carrying a briefcase and a walking stick. Schauman withdrew from the window and started down the stairs towards Bobrikov. As Schauman was hurrying down the stairs he met an employee of his acquaintance, who asked him where he was going. Schauman replied, "I have no time for that now".

Schauman met Bobrikov on the second floor of the staircase. He drew his pistol and stepped in front of Bobrikov. He had earlier asked a doctor friend, Birger Runeberg (a member of the Kagal), where to shoot for the wounds to be fatal. He now fired three shots in accordance with the doctor's advice. The first shot ricocheted off a button on Bobrikov's uniform; the second off the large Cross of Saint Vladimir which Bobrikov wore on his chest, scratching his neck. The third and fatal bullet hit the buckle of Bobrikov's belt, which shattered. That bullet and parts of the buckle entered Bobrikov's stomach.

Schauman then took a couple of steps back and fired two shots into his own heart. He died instantly.

Bobrikov remained standing. He staggered into the session hall of the Senate, dazed and with his hand pressed against his neck. When an attendant offered to help, he replied "Nichevo [it's nothing]". He told the senators "I am not wounded", but when he was told that his neck was dripping blood, he replied "In that case I am wounded".

He was taken to his home on a stretcher, where he was attended by Professor Hjalmar von Bonsdorff and Dr. Liuba. A priest took his confession. The two doctors declared that surgery was necessary.

Bobrikov was taken to the Helsinki Surgical Hospital in Ullanlinna. The operation was performed by the hospital's senior physician, Dr. Richard Faltin, with professors von Bornsdorff and Ali Krogius in attendance. However, Bobrikov's internal organs were so badly damaged that it was impossible to save him. Dr. Faltin later reported, "The case appeared hopeless ... In spite of the use of all means available to medicine, a fatal outcome was inevitable."

Bobrikov died at 1 AM the following morning.

One of the witnesses of the events immediately following the assassination was J. Envall, the doorman at the Senate. In the 1950s Envall told Yleisradio how he had seen Schauman fall to the floor after his suicide and Bobrikov continue on his way to the meeting room. Envall never saw the actual assassination, but he did hear the shots. According to him there were only four shots: three into Bobrikov and one into Schauman. Envall left the scene as the police and other Russian officials arrived to investigate the events. The police later interrogated Envall, who had planned to go to the countryside where his wife was waiting for him.

=== Aftermath ===
News of the Governor-General's death spread rapidly through Helsinki and Finland. Dr. Faltin, who had operated on Bobrikov, stated that he had done his best in the operation, despite not being able to save Bobrikov. The public was informed of the operation from the windows of the hospital. Schauman became a national hero overnight, and pictures of him appeared throughout the city without action on the part of the authorities. People celebrated openly without fear of repercussions.

In due course, the letter that Schauman had addressed to the Tsar became public. In this letter, Schauman attempted to justify the murder, blaming Bobrikov for illegal actions. The letter also sought to draw the Tsar's attention to serious problems throughout the empire, specifically in Poland and the Baltic countries. Schauman made the point that he had been a loyal subject of the Tsar rather than a rebel, and that he maintained his belief in the inherent goodness of the Tsar. He stressed he had acted alone and especially that his family had no part in his actions.

After his death, several philosophical writings by Schauman came to light. These demonstrate that he had been a thoughtful man. One piece, written a couple of days before the murder, explains Schauman's motive:

Freedom is its own end. With certain, rather small limits, it is an inherent right of all people, which no external force can remove. A person has no right to give this right away from themselves, even less from their children. Freedom is the base of self-esteem, and without it the teaching of a person's chaste responsibility would be nothing but lies and deception. Freedom is a sacred thing and the love of freedom is a natural instinct deeply integrated into our hearts. Do you love your country? Good, remember Ibsen's words: "Even if you had given all, but not your own life, you would have given nothing."

=== Burial of Schauman ===
By order of the authorities, Schauman was buried at night in an unmarked grave at the Malmi Cemetery with only his immediate family attending. A Russian military guard was present to prevent any demonstration in support of Schauman. In 1906, the body was transferred to the Schauman family grave at the Näsinmäki Cemetery in Porvoo (Borgå). The reburial was attended by hundreds of supporters, many of whom escorted the coffin from the railway station to the cemetery.

In 1910, a substantial granite monument, designed by Valter Jung, was erected on Schauman's grave, paid for with funds collected by Finnish students.

== Reactions and significance of the murder ==
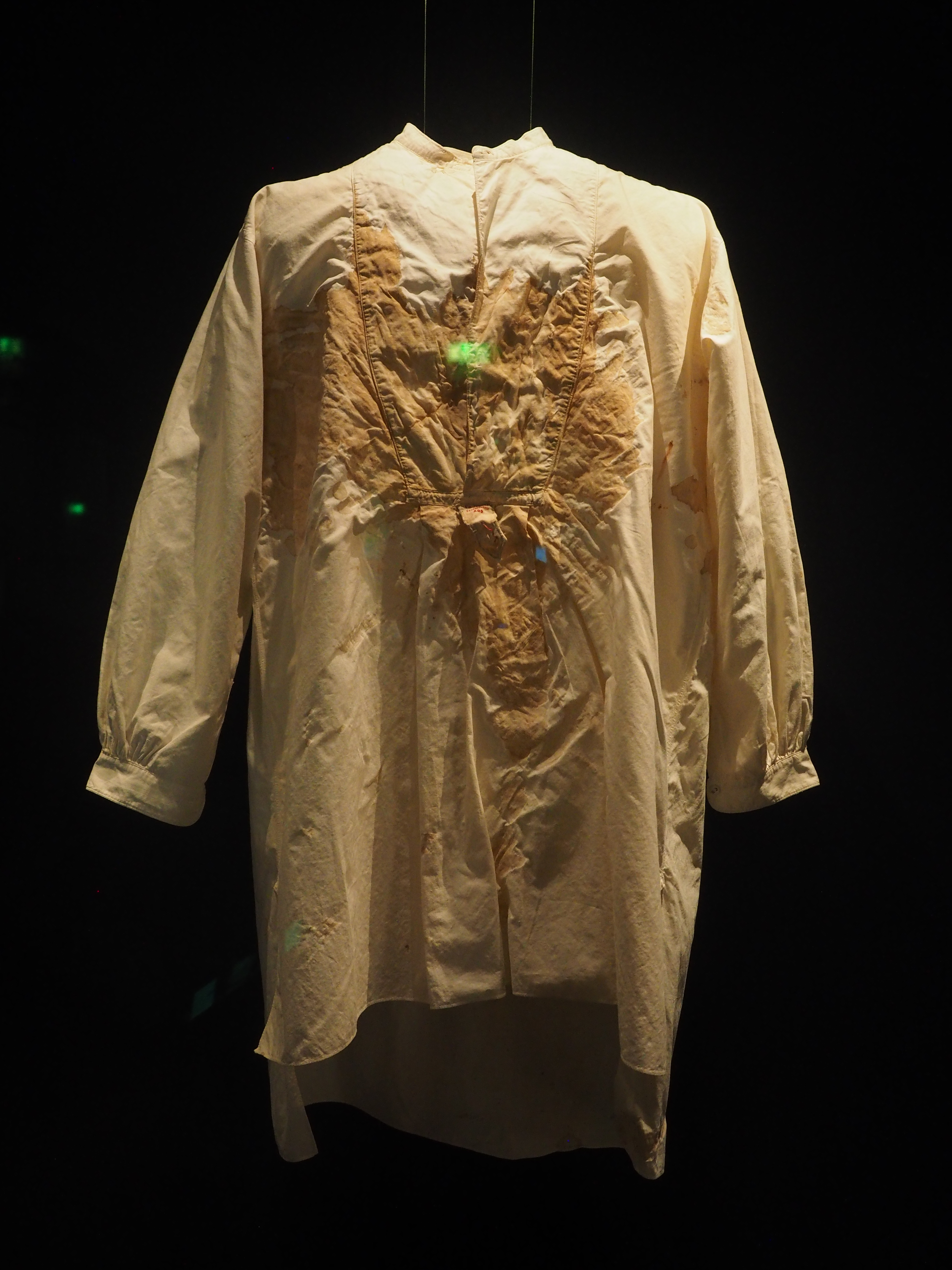
Eugen Schauman's blood-stained shirt on display at the National Museum of Finland.

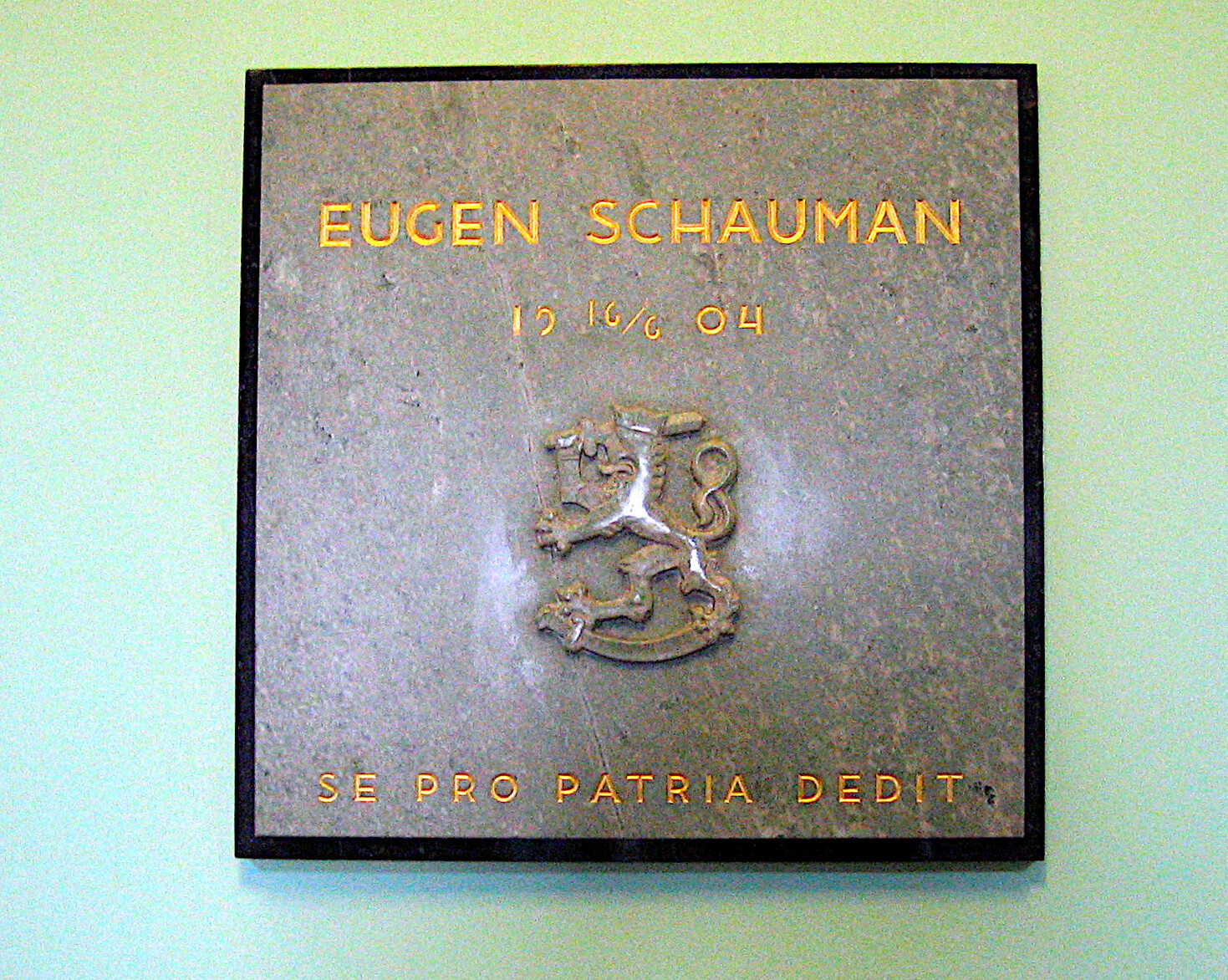
A plaque at the Government Palace in Helsinki to the memory of Eugen Schauman. The Latin text at the bottom says "He gave himself to his country".

The Finns saw the murder as an act of national bravery, with Schauman becoming a national hero. The joy in the country was so great that many people flew Finnish flags in defiance of the consequences. The deputy chancellor of the university, Thiodolf Rein, declared that the murder had been "an act of self defence made on behalf of everyone". The assassination was felt to have been an act of national emergency and a sacrificial death. The Finns expected to gain more freedom with the elimination of Bobrikov, who had oppressed the rights of the Finnish people. A Eugen Schauman cult was born, strengthening the Finnish resistance to the oppression.

Bobrikov was succeeded by Ivan Mikhailovich Obolensky, whose treatment of the Finns was considered fair. This convinced the Finnish activists that the Russians understood the measures they had used, as it was written in the Eugen Schauman memorial booklet of the Active Resistance Party of Finland.

The Päivälehti newspaper published an editorial under the title "Juhannuksena [On Midsummer]", which described how light defeats darkness after all on Midsummer. As a result of this editorial, Päivälehti was shut down permanently.

On the other hand, the traditional Uusi Suometar newspaper condemned the act by writing about it under the title "Rikos [A crime]": "A crime is always a crime, no end purposes can alter this - the people of Finland want peace, it is their wish to resume the circumstances where the emperor and the people in full mutual understanding work for the same and right ends. Because of this we want to do away with responsibility to the disgusting and heinous crime which happened here yesterday." Juho Paasikivi, a future president of Finland, wrote an editorial in the newspaper condemning the murder. The traditional Finns and the clergy condemned the act in general for both political and ethical reasons. When Paasikivi described Bobrikov's murder as a "disgusting and heinous crime" in his editorial, his choice of words was met with hostility. Paasikivi later wrote in his memoirs that he had felt Schauman's act was heroic and that he understood its significance, but he had not dared to say this aloud at the time for fear of repercussions.

The assassination also gained news coverage abroad, made possible by the widespread use of the telegraph and by news agencies. The assassination was covered in the news in San Francisco, Honolulu and Mexico already on the next day.

Eight months after Bobrikov's murder, a student, Lennart Hohenthal, shot and killed procurator Eliel Soisalon-Soininen, a pro-Russian politician, who the activists saw as a supporter of Russification. Hohenthal had earlier planned to murder Bobrikov, but after Schauman's action, he chose Soisalon-Soininen as a new target. The example Schauman and Hohenthal had set encouraged young Finnish activists to engage in further violence towards Russian authorities and pro-Russian Finnish politicians. A third and final known assassination took place in different circumstances in 1922, when a Finnish nobleman, Ernst Tandefelt, shot interior minister Heikki Ritavuori. Tandefelt mentioned having been inspired by Schauman and Hohenthal.

To this day, there is a small plaque in the stairway of the Government Palace (which previously served as the main building of the Senate) at the site of the assassination, bearing the Latin inscription Se pro patria dedit ("Gave himself to his country").

== Cultural references ==
The assassination has been depicted in three films, Kajastus (1930), February Manifesto (1939) and Trust (1976). In each of them, the assassination scene was filmed at the location of the real assassination in the Government Palace. Schauman was played by his relative Runar Schauman in the first two, and by Runar's son Göran Schauman in Trust.

The date of the assassination coincides with part of the novel Ulysses by James Joyce. The assassination is briefly mentioned in the novel.
