= Rapola =

- Rapola, Lithuanian for Raphael (given name)
- Frans Rapola, a Finnish secondary school teacher and politician
- Rapola Castle, a hill fort in Sääksmäki in the municipality of Valkeakoski, Finland
