= Karhijärvi =

Lake in Finland

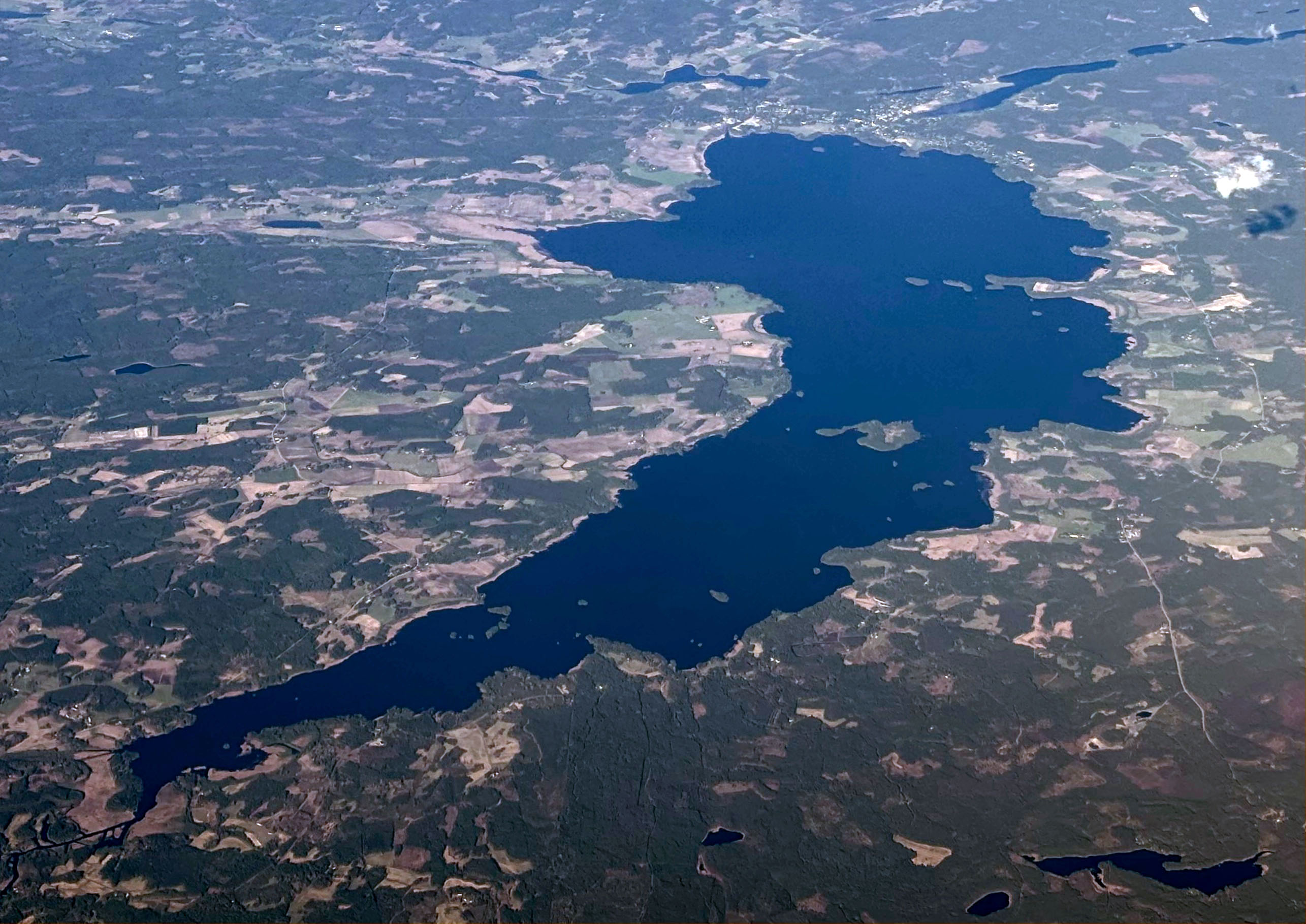
- Interactive map of Karhijärvi
- Coordinates: 61°35′N 22°30′E
- Basin countries: Finland
- Surface area: 33.35 km^{2} (12.88 sq mi)
- Surface elevation: 52.1 m (171 ft)
- Settlements: Lavia

Karhijärvi is a lake in Finland. It is situated in the region of Satakunta in western Finland and there in the city of Pori, on the territory of the former municipality of Lavia. It is part of the Karvianjoki basin. It has an area of 33.35 km^{2} and a surface elevation of 52.1 m.

A small part of the lake northeast of the island Isosalo belongs to Sastamala, formerly Mouhijärvi, as an exclave.

== See also ==
- List of lakes in Finland
