= Ellen Svinhufvud cake =

Finnish cake

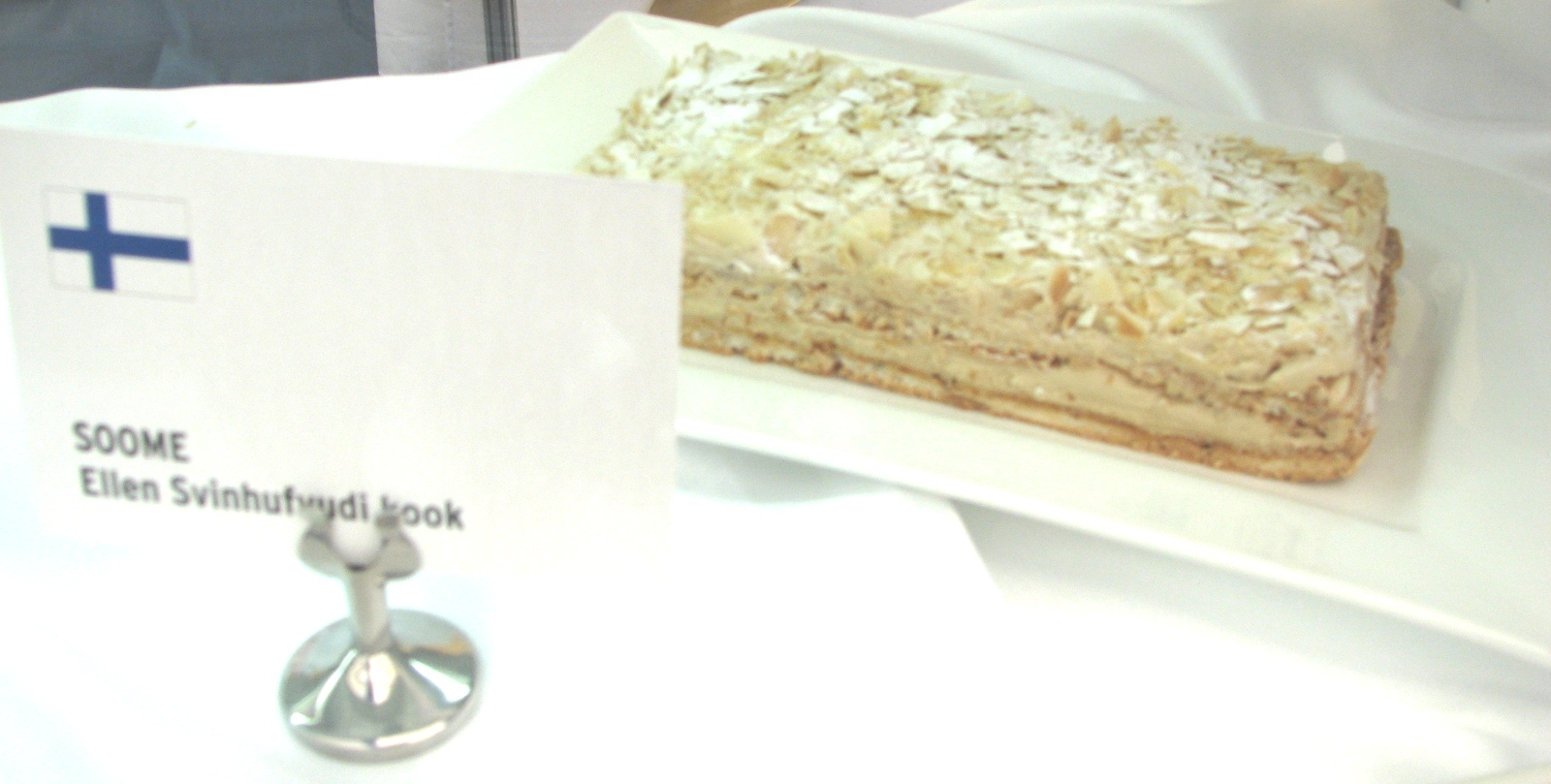
A slice of Ellen Svinhufvud cake

Ellen Svinhufvud cake is a type of cake named after Ellen Svinhufvud, the wife of Pehr Evind Svinhufvud, the third President of Finland. Ellen Svinhufvud also created the concept of "Mother of the country". She was especially fond of almond merengue cake made by Oy Stella Konditoria Ab and offered it to guests at the Presidential Palace. Stella Konditoria asked if they could name the cake after the president's wife. Permission was granted, and so the cake got its name. Ellen Svinhufvud cake became the most popular cake at Stella Konditoria. The magazine Kotikokki published a recipe for the cake in 1956. In the magazine, Stella Konditoria showcased its number one product, so people living in the countryside could also prepare this cake for themselves.

Stella Konditoria registered the Finnish name of the cake, Ellen Svinhufvudin kakku, as a trademark in 1994. Stockmann stopped selling the cake registered by Stella Konditoria and started offering its own "Sans Rival" almond cake to customers with the marketing phrase "Sans Rival cake [:] - The recipe for the traditional Sans Rival cake stems from the early 20th century. This classic and delicious cake has been served at the coffee table of the president's wife Ellen Svinhufvud." This led to a court case which Stella Konditoria won. The court forbade Stockmann from selling Sans Rival cake in such a fashion that it is not distinguishable enough from Ellen Svinhufvud cake and from claiming it had been served at Ellen Svinhufvud's coffee table. The court sentenced Stockmann to a penalty payment of a quarter of a million euro. Because Stockmann's orders amounted to a third of Stella Konditoria's income, Stella Konditoria went bankrupt when the orders stopped. The rights for the cake were transferred to the company Management Events which owns the Billnäs Ironworks in Raseborg.

== Sources ==
- Tanttu, Irmeli: Joulukakku Ellen Svinhufvud, Joulu ulapoilla ja kotona. Suomen Merimieskirkon joululehti 2009, p. 9.
