= Kuopio Lyceum High School =

- Kuopion Lyseon lukio
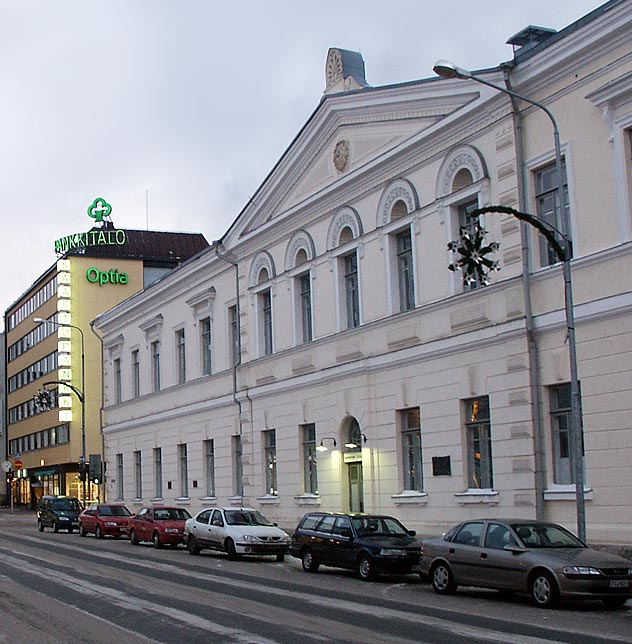
- The school is located in Kuopio city centre.

Location
- Puijonkatu 18; Kuopio; Finland; 62°53′29″N 27°40′45″E

Information
- Established: 1872
- Age range: 15–19
- Enrollment: 450
- Website: kuopion-lyseo.onedu.fi

Kuopio Lyceum High School is an upper secondary school (lukio) for students aged 15–19. Kuopion Lyseon lukio is located in Kuopio, Finland. Originally established as a boys' school in 1872, Kuopion Lyseo opened its doors to both sexes in 1977. The origins of Kuopion Lyseo can be traced further back to Viipurin Triviaalikoulu that was established in 1534 and relocated to Kuopio in 1777.

Kuopion Lyseon lukio is one of the most academically prestigious upper secondary schools in Finland. It is the fifth-highest scoring school in the Finnish Matriculation Examination and its International Baccalaureate class has consistently had one of the highest average final examination scores in Europe. Around 450 students are currently enrolled in the school.

Kuopion Lyseon lukio has been an IB World School since 1994 and as such administers the International Baccalaureate Diploma Programme.

The school building from 1826 is designed by Carl Ludvig Engel.

== Notable alumni ==
- Former president of Finland, Martti Ahtisaari.
- Former Finnish prime minister Paavo Lipponen
- The first professional Finnish writer Juhani Aho
- Film director and comedian Spede Pasanen
- Journalist Lasse Lehtinen, Member of European Parliament.
- August Ahlqvist (A. Oksanen), poet, critic, linguist and professor of Finnish at the University of Helsinki; strongest critic of the Finnish national writer Aleksis Kivi and his novel Seven Brothers
- Finnish chancellor of justice, Eliel Soisalon-Soininen (assassinated in 1905 by student Lennart Hohenthal)
- Bishop of Kuopio diocese, Wille Riekkinen

== History ==
- Viipurin triviaalikoulu (trivium school of Vyborg), established in 1534, was relocated to Kuopio in 1777.
- In 1788, as the relocation seemed to become permanent, the school was replaced by Kuopion triviaalikoulu (trivium school of Kuopio).
- In 1843 the Finnish education system was restructured and the Kuopio's trivium school became initially Kuopion Yläalkeiskoulu (equivalent to junior high school) and a year later in 1844 it was established as Kuopion Lukio (equivalent to senior high school). The first principal of Kuopion Yläalkeiskoulu was Johan Vilhelm Snellman, one of the most influential 19th-century Finnish statesmen and philosophers.
- Kuopion Lyseo was established in 1872 by merging these two schools, Kuopion Yläalkeiskoulu and Kuopion Lukio. Finnish was established as the teaching language.
- In 1975 Kuopion Lyseo was again divited to two different schools: Kauppatorin yläaste, later Vuorilammen yläaste, which is equivalent to junior high school (age group 13–15 years) and Kuopion Lyseon Lukio which is equivalent to senior high school (age group 16–19 years).
- In 1994 Kuopion Lyseon Lukio started also International Baccalaureate school in addition to the regular Finnish lukio senior high school. The teaching language in the IB school is English.

== See also ==
- Kuopio
- Johan Vilhelm Snellman
