= Jaakko Jonkka =

Finnish jurist (1953–2022)

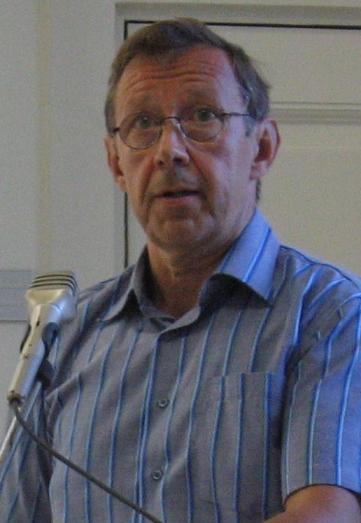

Chancellor of Justice of Finland
- In office July 2007 – January 2018

Personal details
- Born: Jaakko Jonkka; 12 February 1953 Lavia, Finland
- Died: 4 January 2022 (aged 68)

Jaakko Ilari Jonkka (12 February 1953 – 4 January 2022) was a Finnish jurist and the Chancellor of Justice of Finland from 2007 to 2017. He was preceded by Paavo Nikula and succeeded by Tuomas Pöysti.

Jonkka was an attorney, and worked previously at the University of Helsinki. He died on 4 January 2022, at the age of 68.
