= Per Gustaf Svinhufvud af Qvalstad =

Finnish provincial treasurer (1804–1866)

Per Gustaf Svinhufvud af Qvalstad (May 13, 1804 – September 30, 1866) was a Finnish provincial treasurer of Tavastia and the host of the Rapola Manor in Sääksmäki. His grandson was Pehr Evind Svinhufvud, the future third President of the Republic of Finland.

Svinhufvud was born in Sääksmäki and his parents were Lieutenant Pehr Johansson Svinhufvud af Qvalstad (1772–1846) and Sara Juliana Teetgren (1776–1828). From a young age, Svinhufvud studied law in Turku and from 1830 worked as an official of Kymmenegård, then of the Mikkeli Provincial Government, from 1838 first as a provincial chamber in Heinola, then in Mikkeli, but also cultivated his home in Rapola's stone barn. Svinhufvud married 20-year-old Ulrika Charlotta Fredrika von Kraemer (1813–1852) in Hämeenlinna on June 28, 1833.

His son Per Gustaf Svinhufvud af Qvalstad II (1836–1863), the father of Pehr Evind Svinhufvud, chose a career as a sailor and traveled as a sea captain all the way to East India and Bengal. He was drowned in a shipwreck in the Greek archipelago in 1863 at the age of 27, when his son Pehr Evind was only 2 years old. Grandfather Svinhufvud took care of his grandchildren while maintaining the farm of Rapola. However, the manor with its premises was eventually heavily indebted, and before Rapola was forced into auction, the depressed Svinhufvud committed suicide by shooting himself in 1866 when his grandson Pehr Evind was only 4 years old.

== See also ==
- Svinhufvud (family)
