= Ellen Svinhufvud =

First Lady of Finland 1931–1937

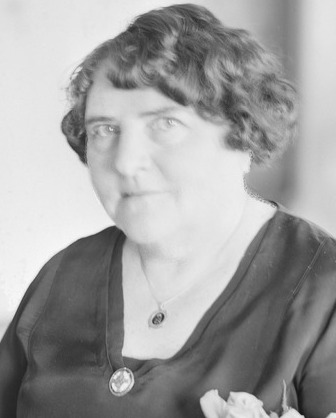
- Ellen Svinhufvud in 1931.
- Born: Alma Ellen Timgren; 23 December 1869; Turku, Grand Duchy of Finland
- Died: 24 August 1953 (aged 83); Luumäki, Finland
- Spouse: Pehr Evind Svinhufvud (m. 1889; died 1944)

Ellen Svinhufvud (née Timgren; 23 December 1869 – 24 August 1953) was the wife of Finland's third president, Pehr Evind Svinhufvud, serving as the First Lady of Finland from 1931 until 1937.

She married Pehr Evind Svinhufvud in 1889, and the couple had six children.

She was active in the women's paramilitary Lotta Svärd organisation, as well as in the Martha organisation.

Her personal interests included various handicrafts, and she even had a loom installed in the Presidential Palace. She was also a keen gardener, and skilled at looking after the family manor house and farm in Luumäki.

When receiving guests in Helsinki Ellen Svinhufvud often served a type of cake made by the bakery Konditoria Stella with an almond base and coffee-flavoured cream, known since the 1930s as Ellen Svinhufvud cake.
