= Sääksmäki =

- Former municipality
- Sääksmäen kunta Sääksmäki kommun
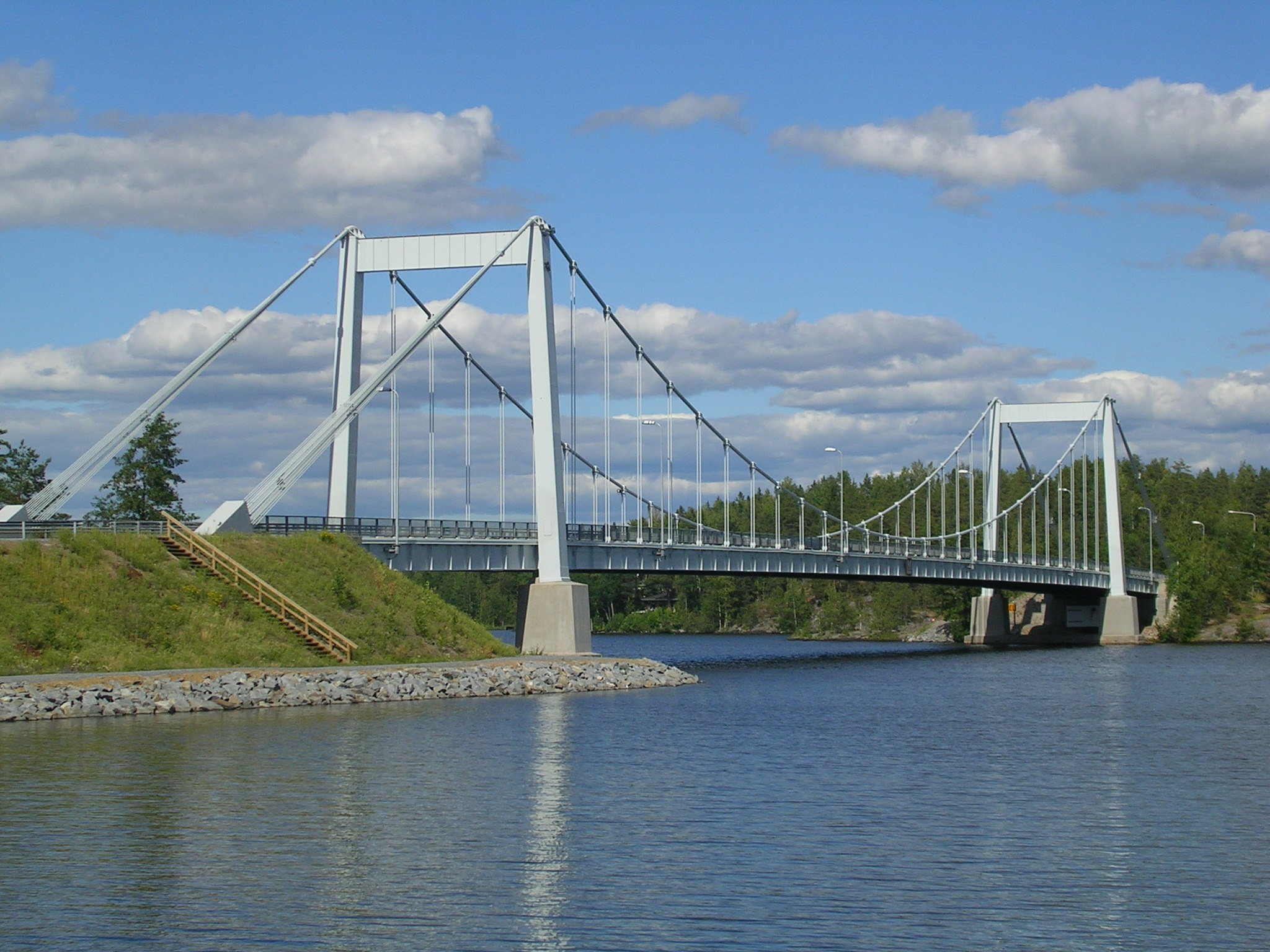
- Sääksmäki Bridge

- Coat of arms

- Location of Sääksmäki in Finland
- Coordinates: 61°12′N 024°04′E
- Country: Finland
- Region: Pirkanmaa
- Charter: c. 1340
- Consolidated: 1973

Area
  - Land: 215.8 km^{2} (83.3 sq mi)

Population (1970)
  - Total: 4,467
- Time zone: UTC+2 (EET)
  - Summer (DST): UTC+3 (EEST)

Sääksmäki is a former municipality, currently part of Valkeakoski in the Pirkanmaa region of Western Finland. A past president of Finland, Pehr Evind Svinhufvud, the Finnish film producer and director Veikko Aaltonen, eminent Finnish historian Eino Jutikkala, and actress Pirkko Mannola, were born there.

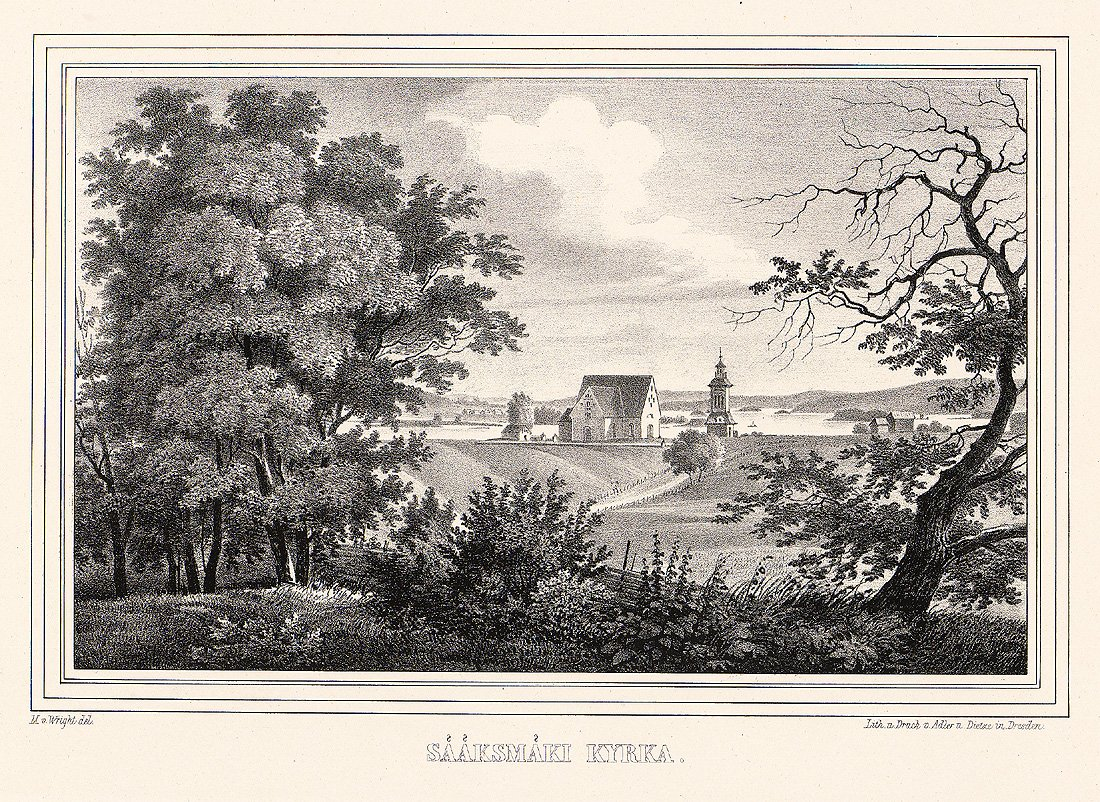
The church illustrated in 1845 in Finland framstäldt i teckningar

Sääksmäki's most famous building is the medieval stone Sääksmäki Church, built at the end of the 15th century. It is one of the oldest buildings in Finland. It features wooden sculptures that were created by an anonymous artist, known as the "Master of Sääksmäki". Sääksmäki's architecture also includes manor houses that date back hundreds of years.

== History ==
The name Sääksmäki means "osprey hill". It was mentioned in 1340 in a papal bull by Pope Benedict XII, in which he excommunicated 25 peasants from Sääksmäki as they had not paid their taxes. The excommunication was requested by the Bishop of Turku, Henricus Hartmanni. This letter provides some information on contemporary Finnish names, though their written forms do not accurately represent their actual pronunciations.

=== Saarioispuoli ===
The southern part of Sääksmäki, divided from the main part of Sääksmäki by the lake Vanajavesi, is known as Saarioispuoli. The area was ecclesiastically subordinate to Sääksmäki, but has been an administrative unit called Saarioinen since the 14th century.

Akaa (with Toijala and Kylmäkoski) was originally a division of Saarioinen and the Akaa parish established in 1483 was sometimes called Saarioinen, even though the two did not have the exact same territory. Some parts of Punkalaidun were also included in the Saarioinen division. Viiala, despite being subordinate to the Akaa parish, was not administratively a part of Saarioinen, but a part of Lempäälä instead.

The people of Saarioinen also had hunting grounds in what is now Central Finland. The first settlers of Jyväskylä and nearby Palokka came from Saarioinen.

=== Modern history ===
Valkeakoski was separated from Sääksmäki in 1923, while Sääksmäki was consolidated with Valkeakoski in 1973.

== People born in Sääksmäki ==
- Johan Ulrik Sebastian Gripenberg (1795 – 1869)
- Carl Fabian Langenskiöld (1810 – 1863)
- Pehr Evind Svinhufvud (1861 – 1944)
- Pehr Gustaf Svinhufvud af Qvalstad (1804 – 1866)
- Frans Rapola (1862 – 1910)
- Emil Aaltonen (1869 – 1949)
- Kalle Kustaa Paasia (1883 – 1961)
- August Syrjänen (1883 – 1956)
- Julius Nurminen (1887 – 1918)
- Tuomas Saikku (1906 – 1963)
- Eino Jutikkala (1907 – 2006)
- Eino Raunio (1909 – 1979)
- Kauko Tamminen (1920 – 1989)
- Olavi Nikkilä (1922 – 2014)
- Anita Välkki (1926 – 2011)
- Pirkko Mannola (1938 – )
- Veikko Aaltonen (1955 – )

== See also ==
- Rapola Castle
