= Tuomas Saikku =

Finnish politician (1906–1963)

Tuomas Veikko Saikku (22 December 1906 - 19 September 1963) was a Finnish agronomist, farmer and politician, born in Sääksmäki. He was a member of the Parliament of Finland from 1956 to 1958, representing the National Coalition Party.
