= Pehr Evind Svinhufvud =

Finnish politician (1861–1944)

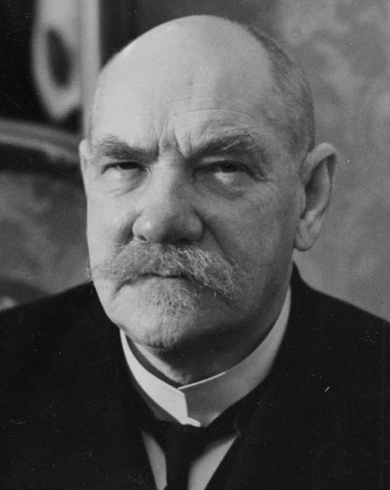
- Svinhufvud in 1920

3rd President of Finland
- In office 2 March 1931 – 1 March 1937
- Prime Minister: Juho Sunila; Toivo Mikael Kivimäki; Kyösti Kallio
- Preceded by: Lauri Kristian Relander
- Succeeded by: Kyösti Kallio

1st Prime Minister of Finland
- In office 4 July 1930 – 18 February 1931
- President: Lauri Kristian Relander
- Preceded by: Kyösti Kallio
- Succeeded by: Juho Sunila
- In office 27 November 1917 – 27 May 1918
- Preceded by: Position established
- Succeeded by: Juho Kusti Paasikivi

Regent of Finland
- In office 18 May 1918 – 12 December 1918
- Preceded by: Position established
- Succeeded by: Gustaf Mannerheim

Chairman of the Senate of Finland
- In office 27 November 1917 – 27 May 1918
- Preceded by: Eemil Nestor Setälä
- Succeeded by: Juho Kusti Paasikivi

Personal details
- Born: Pehr Evind Svinhufvud af Qvalstad; 15 December 1861 Sääksmäki, Grand Duchy of Finland, Russian Empire
- Died: 29 February 1944 (aged 82) Luumäki, Finland
- Resting place: Luumäki Cemetery
- Party: Young Finnish Party (before 1918); National Coalition Party (after 1918)
- Spouse: Ellen Timgren (m. 1889)
- Children: 6
- Relatives: Per Gustaf Svinhufvud af Qvalstad (paternal grandfather): See Svinhufvud family
- Education: Imperial Alexander University (now University of Helsinki)
- Occupation: Lawyer; judge
- Nickname: Ukko-Pekka

Pehr Evind Svinhufvud af Qvalstad (Finland Swedish: [ˈpæːr ˈeːʋin(d) ˈsviːnhʉːʋʉd ɑːv kʋɑːlstɑːd], 15 December 1861 – 29 February 1944) served as the president of Finland from 1931 to 1937. Before 1917, as a lawyer, judge, and politician in the Grand Duchy of Finland (at that time an autonomous state within the Russian Empire), Svinhufvud played a major role in the movement for Finnish independence, and he presented the Declaration of Independence to the Parliament on 15 December [O.S. 2 December] 1917.

From December 1917 until May 1918, Svinhufvud operated as the first head of government of independent Finland as Chairman of the Senate. He led the White government during the Finnish Civil War of January to May 1918, while Mannerheim led the White Finnish armies. After the war, he served as Finland's first temporary head of state with the title of Regent (May to December 1918) during the project to establish a German-aligned monarchy in the country, prior to stepping down in favour of Mannerheim. He later served as Prime Minister from 1930 to 1931, before his election as national president in January 1931. During his presidency, Svinhufvud successfully called for an end to the Mäntsälä rebellion of 1932.

As a conservative and nationalist who strongly opposed communism and the Left in general, Svinhufvud did not become a President embraced by all the people, although as the amiable Ukko-Pekka ("Old Man Pekka"), he did enjoy wide popularity. Svinhufvud's sharp line as a defender of Finland's legal rights during the period under Russian rule was especially valued from the early years of independence until the end of World War II, unlike in later decades. After the collapse of the communist bloc and the Soviet Union in the early 1990s, appreciation of Svinhufvud increased.

== Family background and early life ==
Pehr Gustaf Svinhufvud af Qvalstad II (1836–1864); Pehr Evind's father	Olga von Becker (1836–1921); Pehr Evind's mother

Pehr Evind Svinhufvud af Qvalstad was born in Sääksmäki in to a Finnish noble family. He was the son of Pehr Gustaf Svinhufvud af Qvalstad II, a sea captain, and Olga von Becker. His father drowned at sea off Greece in 1863, when Pehr Evind was only two years old. He spent his early childhood at the home of his paternal grandfather, Per Gustaf Svinhufvud af Qvalstad (a provincial treasurer of Häme), at Rapola, where the family had lived for five generations. The Svinhufvuds (literally translated as "Swine-head") are a Finland-Swedish noble family tracing their history back to Dalarna, Sweden. Pehr Gustaf Svinhufvud af Qvalstad, an army lieutenant in the reign of Charles XII, had moved from there to Rapola after the Great Northern War. The family had been ennobled in Sweden in 1574, and it was also introduced to the Finnish House of Nobility in 1818. Rapola was sold when his grandfather shot himself in 1866, and Svinhufvud moved to Helsinki with his mother and his sister.

He attended the Swedish-language high school in Helsinki. In 1878, at the age of 16, he enrolled at the Imperial Alexander University of Helsinki. There he gained a Bachelor's degree in 1881, and then completed a Master of Arts degree in 1882; his main subjects being Finnish, Russian and Scandinavian History. After this, he took a Master of Laws degree, graduating in 1886. In 1889, Svinhufvud married Alma (Ellen) Timgren (1869–1953). They had six children, Yngve (1890–1991), Ilmo Gretel (1892–1969), Aino Mary (1893–1980), Eino (1896–1938), Arne (1904–1942), and Veikko (1908–1969).

== Lawyer and a politician ==
Svinhufvud's career in law followed a regular course: he worked as a lawyer, served at district courts, and served as a deputy judge at the Turku Court of Appeal. In 1892 he was appointed as a member of the Senate's law-drafting committee at the relatively young age of 31. For six years he worked in the committee, initially redrafting taxation laws. As head of his family, Svinhufvud participated as a member of the Estate of Nobles in the Diet of Finland in 1894 and 1899–1906.

He found his work on the law-drafting committee tedious and moved to the Court of Appeal as an assistant judge in 1902, his long-term goal being the easy life of a rural judge. Svinhufvud stayed mainly in the background until 1899, when Imperial Russia initiated a Russification policy for the autonomous Grand Duchy. The Finnish answer was mainly legislative and constitutional resistance, of which Svinhufvud became a central figure as a judge in the Court of Appeals.

When some inhabitants of Helsinki lodged a complaint with the Turku Court of Appeal in 1902, concerning violence employed by the Russian Governor of Uusimaa to break up a demonstration against military call-ups, the court initiated proceedings against Governor-General Bobrikov. Bobrikov demanded that they be stopped, and when this did not happen, he used a decree which the Finns regarded as illegal to dismiss sixteen officials of the court, including Svinhufvud.

Originally a moderate of the Finnish Party or Old Finnish Party, after his dismissal Svinhufvud became a strict constitutionalist who regarded the resistance of judges and officials as a question of justice, not believing that political expediency offered compromises. He moved to Helsinki to work as a lawyer and participated in the political activities both of the Diet and of a secret society, Kagal.

He also acted as defence counsel for Lennart Hohenthal, who had murdered procurator Eliel Soisalon-Soininen in 1905.

Svinhufvud played a key role in the birth of a new parliamentary system in 1905 and he was elected as a Young Finnish Party member of the new Parliament in 1906. Svinhufvud went on to serve as a member of Parliament on four occasions (1907–1908, 1908–1914, 1917, and 1930–1931).

After being appointed as a judge in Heinola in 1906, he attempted to keep out of the front line of politics. However he was elected Speaker of the Parliament in 1907, largely because the majority Social Democrats considered him "the best-known opponent of illegality". Svinhufvud's parliamentary opening speeches, in which he laid emphasis on legality, led to the Tsar dissolving Parliament in both 1909 and 1910. He served as Speaker until 1912. Svinhufvud also served as a judge in Lappee 1908–1914.

During the First World War Russia replaced various Finnish officials with Russians. Svinhufvud refused to obey the orders of the Russian procurator Konstantin Kazansky, which he considered illegal, and this led to his removal from office as a judge and being exiled to Tomsk in Siberia in November 1914. In his Siberian exile, he spent his time hunting and mending his clothes, still keeping secret contact with the independence movement. When he left Finland, he had promised to return "with the help of God and Hindenburg". When news of the February Revolution reached Svinhufvud, he walked to the town's police station and bluntly announced, "The person who sent me here has been arrested. Now I'm going home." In Helsinki he was greeted as a national hero and in April that same year he was appointed procurator.

== Independence and the Civil War ==
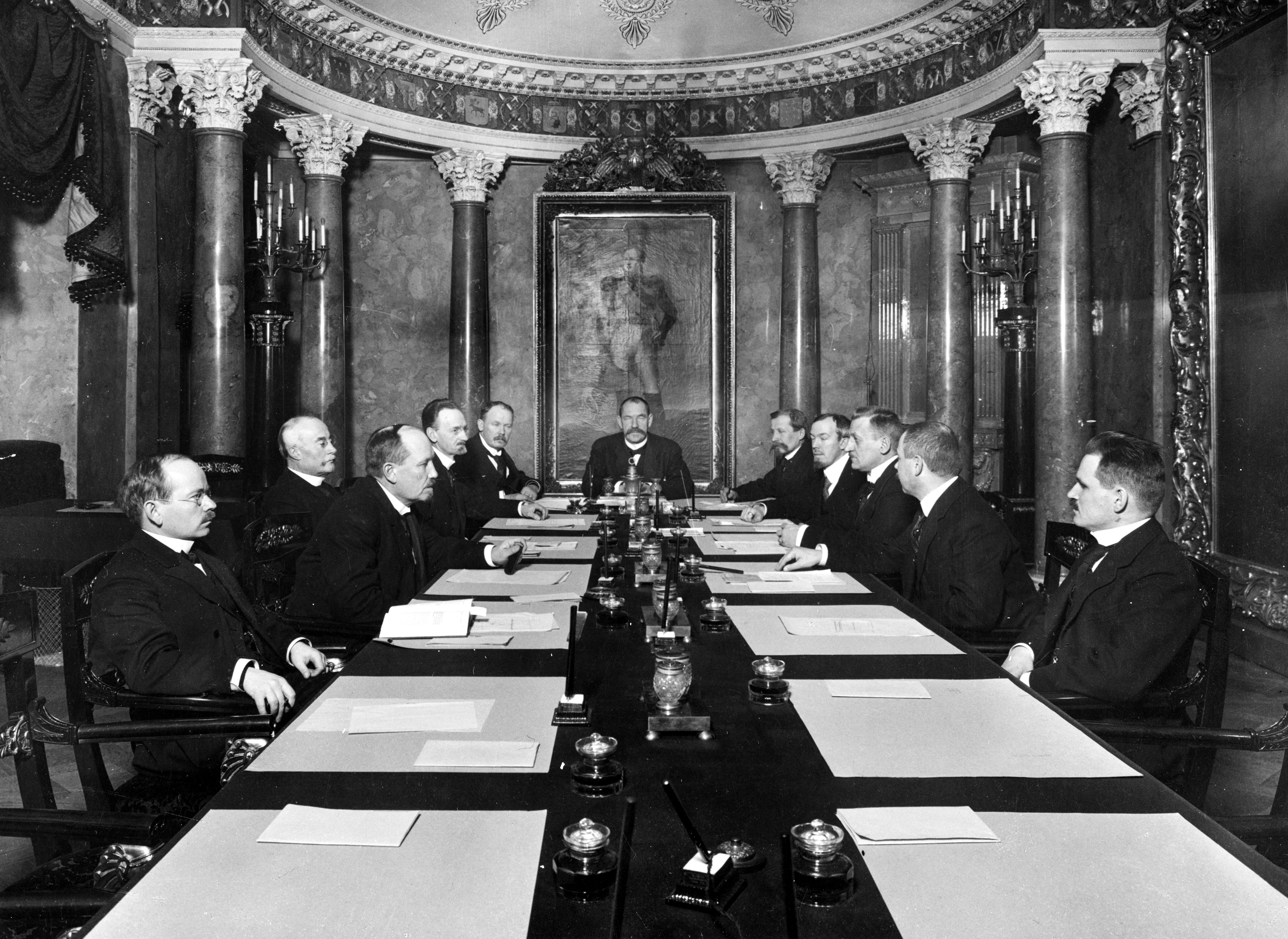
The Finnish Senate of 1917, Svinhufvud in the head of table.

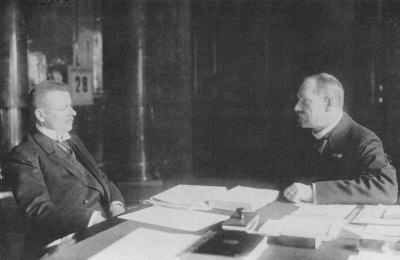
J. K. Paasikivi (left) and Svinhufvud discuss the Finnish monarchy project in 1918

Svinhufvud was appointed as Chairman of the Senate on 27 November 1917, and was a key figure in the announcement of Finland's declaration of independence on 6 December 1917. He also personally went to Saint Petersburg with Carl Enckell and Gustaf Idman to meet Vladimir Ilyich Lenin, who gave his official recognition of Finnish independence. This is how the meeting is told in Svinhufvud's biography Svinhufvud ja itsenäisyyssenaatti written by Erkki Räikkönen:

After trying in vain to meet the Soviets on December 30, 1917 - then Sunday - the next day, the delegation managed to submit this letter to Lenin's secretary, and in the evening at 9 o'clock it went to Smolny, Saint Petersburg to hear the decision. "We waited a couple of hours in the big hallway and sat at the corner of the table," says Svinhufvud, "and we had the furs on and the caps on hand, because they didn't dare leave them." Smolny was busy despite the late hours. Guests came and went, typists ran down the hallways, even toddlers on the floor. On several occasions, Enckell tried to rush to the Soviet government's head of office, Vladimir Bonch-Bruyevich, but nothing helped. "We could only see," says Enckell, "how in one room the People's Commissars sat in thick tobacco smoke and probably pondered our case." Despite the fact that the furs were on, it became cold in the hallway while waiting. Finally, almost at midnight, Bonch-Bruyevich brought the decision of the Board of Commissioners.

It was worded as follows: "We rose one after another and signed with special satisfaction the recognition of Finland's independence," writes I. Steinberg, who was a justice commissioner in Lenin's government. "We knew that Finland's current hero Svinhufvud, once sent to exile by the tsar, was our public social enemy. and that he would not spare any of us in the future. But if we free the Finnish people from the oppression of Russia, there will be one less historical injustice in the world." Despite the fact that this letter merely announced the proposed recognition of Finland's independence, it actually meant full recognition of independence, as the confirmation of the Executive Committee was only a formality. Thus, in the last hour of the last day of the year, Finland had received an official certificate of resignation from Russia. After handing over this formal declaration of independence to the delegation, Bonch-Bruyevich planned to say goodbye and leave, but then Enckell pointed out: "When the Chairman of the Finnish Government is here, would it not be desirable for him to meet Lenin in person and express his gratitude to the Finnish people for the recognition of their independence."

Bonch-Bruyevich now went back to the commissioners' room, informing the commissioners that Svinhufvud was waiting in the hallway and wanted to thank Lenin. This resulted in great confusion, Lenin shrugged, laughed a little embarrassed, and refused. "What can I say to those bourgeoisie!" It was then suggested that Leon Trotsky go to greet the guests, but he too refused sharply. It was finally invented that Justice Commissioner Steinberg should agree to the request. "What can I tell them," he asked and continued: "I could only arrest them in my post!" Trotsky laughed cunningly at this: "Like you would capture!" Now Bonch-Bruyevich was nervous. He interrupted the play and again asked Lenin to go out to greet the Finns. In a worn suit and head presses, Lenin was now following Bonch-Bruyevich, while the hall was still laughing and counting dives. "Lenin came and held out his hand to us, and we introduced him to Svinhufvud," says Enckell of this historic scene, adding that "Lenin squeezed Svinhufvud's hand cordially.""Are you satisfied now?" Lenin asked. "Very satisfied," replied Svinhufvud. "Russia was spoken there and answered in Russian," says Svinhufvud, adding that "it only said a sad thank you for the letter of resignation." The Finns left now. Svinhufvud, Enckell, and Idman rushed quickly to the Secretary of State's Office. A typewritten copy of the recognition of independence was urgently taken there, after which we left for the station and from there continued by train to Finland. A few days later, the Russian Central Executive Committee confirmed the recognition of Finland's independence, which was thus finally decided for Russia.

Svinhufvud's Senate also authorized General Mannerheim to form a new Finnish army on the basis on White Guard, the (chiefly Rightist) volunteer militia called the Suojeluskunta, an act simultaneously coinciding with the beginning of the Civil War in Finland.

During the Civil War, Svinhufvud went underground in Helsinki and sent pleas for intervention to Germany and Sweden. The conflict also turned him into an active monarchist, though not a royalist. In March 1918 he managed to escape via Berlin-Stockholm to the Senate, now located in Vaasa, where he resumed his function as head of government. In this role he pardoned 36,000 Red prisoners in the autumn of 1918. On 18 May, Svinhufvud became Protector of State or Regent, retaining this post as head of state after he stood down as Chairman of the Senate on 27 May.

Svinhufvud actively worked to install a German prince as Finnish king, travelling to Berlin to personally ask Kaiser Wilhelm II to allow his son Prince Oskar to become king. For Svinhufvud, the monarchy was a means of securing German support rather than an ideological conviction. After Germany's defeat in World War I and the failed attempt to make Finland a monarchy under the King of Finland (Frederick Charles of Hesse was elected), Svinhufvud stepped down as Regent in favour of Mannerheim.

== Interlude 1919–1930 ==
After leaving office, Svinhufvud worked for some years as managing director of the credit institution Suomen Vakuus Oy in Turku, though the venture was unsuccessful. He was subsequently granted a state pension and retired to Luumäki, withdrawing from public life. During this period his primary interest became the Civil Guard, in which he rose from soldier to sergeant major and became an accomplished competitive marksman.

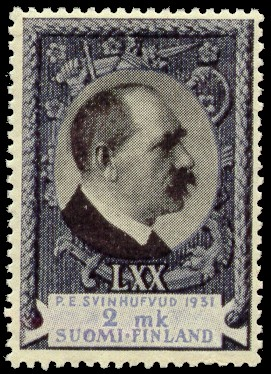
Svinhufvud postage stamp from 1931.

== Prime Minister and President ==
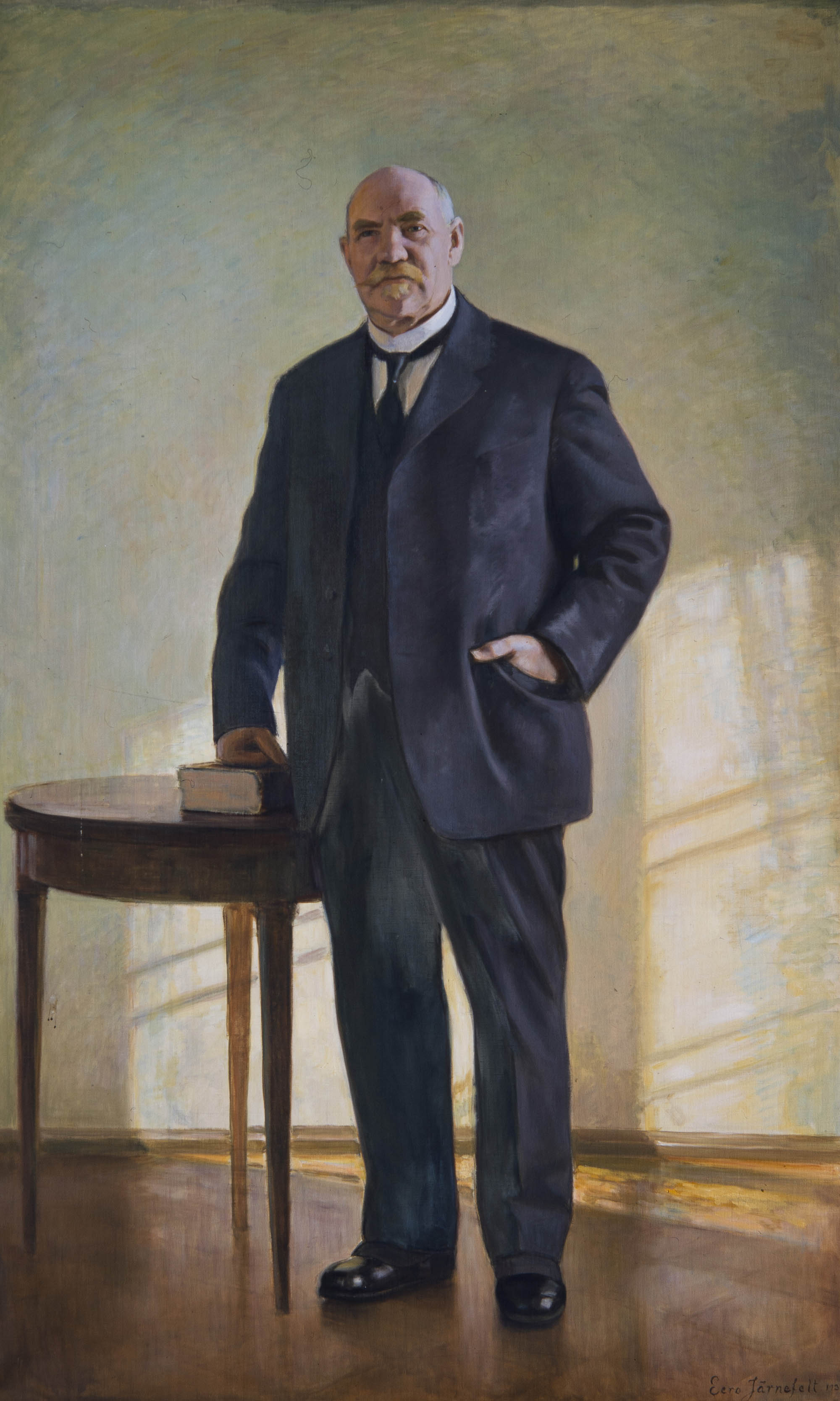
Portrait by Eero Järnefelt in 1933

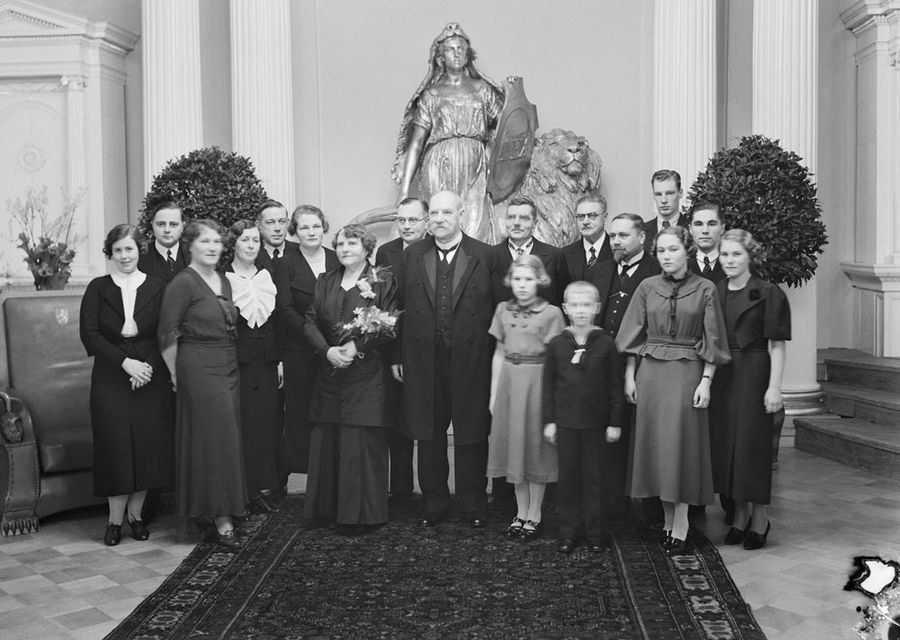
Svinhufvud with his family on his 75th birthday in 1936

In 1925 he was the presidential candidate for the conservative Kokoomus party, but was not elected. After the emergence of the anti-communist Lapua Movement, President Relander appointed him as Prime Minister of Finland on the Lapua Movement's insistence. Svinhufvud was elected president in 1931 after winning by the narrowest of margins, receiving 151 votes against Ståhlberg's 149. He appointed Mannerheim as Chairman of the Defence Council, not least of all as an answer to the Lapua Movement's fear of having fought the Civil War in vain.

He resisted both communist agitation and the Lapua Movement's exploits. All Communist members of parliament were arrested. In February 1932 there was a so-called Mäntsälä Rebellion, when the Suojeluskunta-Militia and the Lapua Movement demanded the Cabinet's resignation. The turning point came with the President's broadcast radio speech, in which he called on the rebels to surrender and ordered all Civil Guard members who were heading for Mäntsälä to return to their homes:

"Throughout my long life, I have struggled for the maintenance of law and justice, and I cannot permit the law to now be trampled underfoot and citizens to be led into armed conflict with one another.... Since I am now acting on my own responsibility, beholden to no-one, and have taken it upon myself to restore peace to the country, from now on every secret undertaking is aimed not only at the legal order but at me personally as well - at me, who have myself marched in the ranks of the Civil Guards as an upholder of social peace.... Peace must be established in the country as swiftly as possible, and the defects that exist in our national life must thereafter be eliminated within the framework of the legal order."

His speech stopped the rebellion before anything serious happened.

Svinhufvud made no official state visits during his presidency, nor did any foreign heads of state visit Finland officially during this period. He deliberately delegated most foreign policy matters to his foreign ministers Aarno Yrjö-Koskinen and Antti Hackzell.

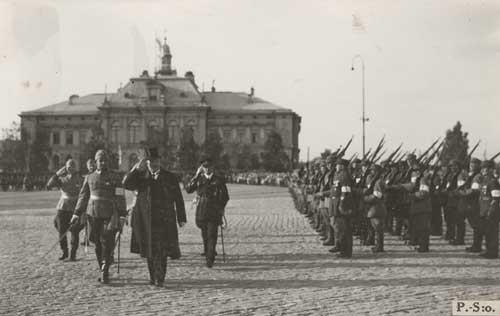
President Svinhufvud in the market square of Kuopio on August 24, 1934.

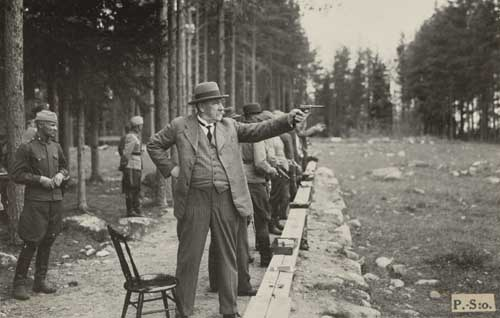
President Svinhufvud shooting at Kuopio shooting range in 1934.

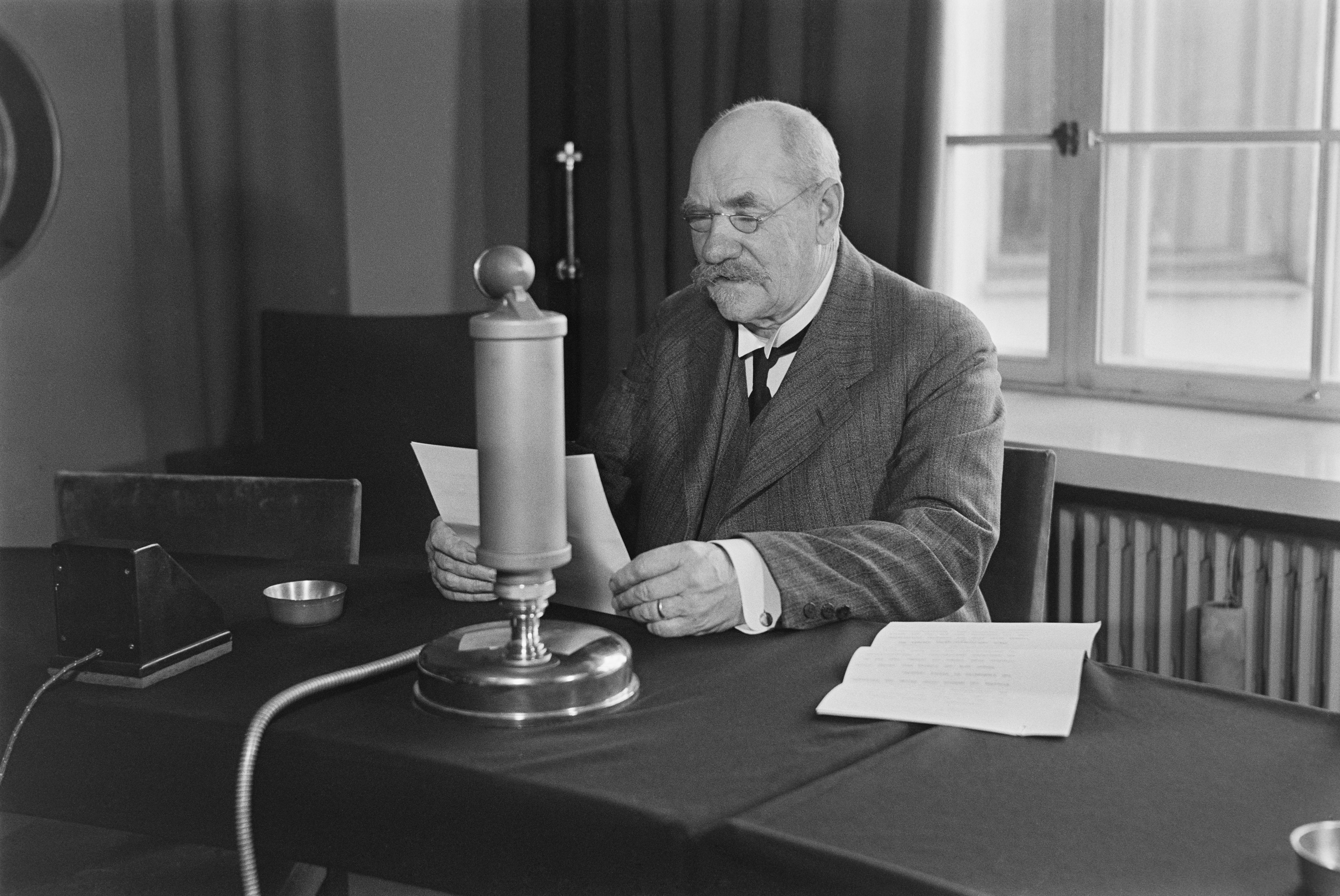
President Svinhufvud giving a radio speech in honour of the 10th anniversary of the Finnish Broadcasting Company in 1936.

Svinhufvud was not a supporter of Parliamentarism, or to put it differently, he believed that the President had a right to choose the Cabinet ministers after first consulting the parliamentary parties. Evidence of this semi-presidential attitude was the minority government of Toivo M. Kivimäki, which survived for 3 years and 10 months (December 1932 – October 1936). Svinhufvud strongly supported it, because he believed that it could effectively fight the Great Depression (which it did, generally speaking), he believed that Kivimäki had a strong personality like himself, and possibly because he hoped that the Agrarians and Swedish People's Party would let the Kivimäki government remain in office as a lesser evil, the greater evil being an Agrarian-Social Democratic government.

On the other hand, when a right-wing Conservative member of Parliament, Edwin Linkomies, proposed in 1934 that Finland abandon parliamentarism in favour of a government led by the President and that the President be given an absolute veto power over the laws passed by the Parliament, Svinhufvud opposed his ideas. In Svinhufvud's opinion, the Finnish President had enough power to lead the country, provided that the President had a strong personality. He believed it to be better for Finland if the Social Democrats could be kept outside of the Cabinet. In his opinion, they would implement too radical reforms that would lead the Finnish society into chaos or Marxism. On the other hand, he was realistic enough to admit privately to the German Ambassador to Finland, Wipert von Blücher, that if he was re-elected, he would be unable to keep the Social Democrats in the opposition.

They were, after all, Finland's largest political party with over 40% of the deputies (see, for example, Seppo Zetterberg et al., ed., "A Small Giant of the Finnish History" / Suomen historian pikkujättiläinen, Helsinki: Werner Söderström Publications Ltd., 2003; Virkkunen, "The Finnish Presidents I"). It was due to this that, in the presidential election of 1937, the Social Democrats and the Agrarian party voted against him. He was not re-elected.

At the end of Winter War, he unsuccessfully sought audience with both Adolf Hitler and Benito Mussolini but met only Pope Pius XII. During the Continuation War he supported the idea of an expansionistic war.

Svinhufvud's most important and beloved hobbies were hunting and precision shooting. His grandson Jorma Svinhufvud describes:

As an old man, he was still a Finnish multiple champion. At the time of the World Shooting Championships in Finland, he was a guest of honor, but he could not avoid participating in the competition itself. He then took part in the shooting of the elders and won the competition.

Svinhufvud died at Luumäki in 1944, while Finland was seeking peace with the Soviet Union.

He refused to Finnicize the name of his 500-year-old noble house.

== Legacy ==
Svinhufvud's legacy has been a mixed one. He has been praised for his firm commitment to legality and his fearless defence of Finland's legal rights under Russian rule, which demanded personal sacrifice and led to his Siberian exile, as well as for his resolute intervention in the Mäntsälä rebellion. On the other hand, he has been criticised for his one-sided political activities and in particular for his total reliance on Germany in 1918.

A statue of Svinhufvud was erected in 1961 outside the Parliament House, near the statue of Ståhlberg. The statue was created by sculptor Wäinö Aaltonen.

== Cabinets ==
- Pehr Evind Svinhufvud's first senate
- Svinhufvud II Cabinet

== Honours ==
Coat of Arms of Pehr Evind Svinhufvud
- Armiger: Pehr Evind Svinhuvud

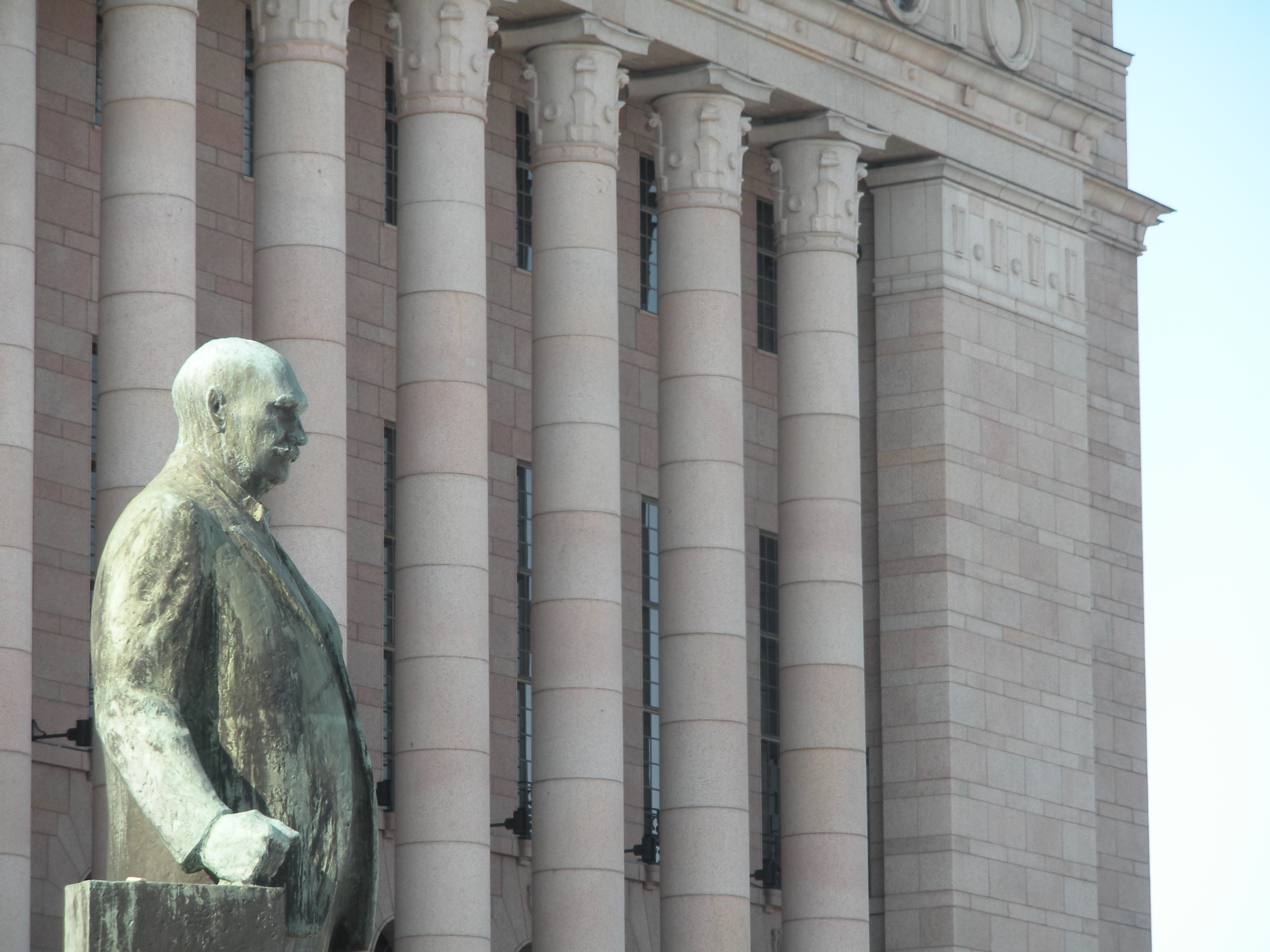
The statue of Svinhufvud in front of the Parliament House on July 5, 1967

=== Awards and decorations ===
- Finland : Grand Cross with Collar of the Order of the White Rose of Finland (Finland) (1927)
- Finland : Grand Cross of the Order of the Cross of Liberty (1918)
- Czechoslovakia : Collar of the Order of the White Lion, Czechoslovakia (12 December 1931)
- Sweden : Knight of the Order of the Seraphim, Sweden (3 December 1932)
- Poland : Order of the White Eagle
- Estonia : Order of the Cross of the Eagle
- Hungary : Order of Merit of the Kingdom of Hungary
- Egypt : Chain of the Order of Muhammad Ali (1936)
- Latvia : Grand Gross with Collar of the Order of the Three Stars (14 December 1931)

== In popular culture ==
Svinhufvud appears as one of the main characters in the 1976 Finnish-Soviet historical drama film Trust, directed by Viktor Tregubovich and Edvin Laine, which portrays the events leading up to the Finnish Declaration of Independence from Russia in 1917. In the film, Svinhufvud was played by Vilho Siivola.

== See also ==
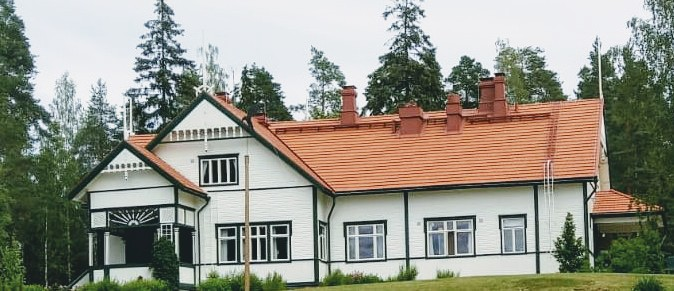
Kotkaniemi, a former home of President Svinhufvud and current museum, in Luumäki, South Karelia

- Finnish Declaration of Independence
- List of presidents of Finland
- Ukko-Pekka (locomotive)

== Sources ==
=== Literature ===
- Erkki Räikkönen: Svinhufvudin kertomukset Siperiasta. Otava, 1928.
- Erkki Räikkönen: Ukko-Pekka Siperiassa: pastorinrouva Johanna von Hörschelmannin päiväkirjan kertomus presidentti P. E. Svinhufvudin Siperian-matkan vaiheista. Otava, 1931.
- Erkki Räikkönen: Suuri juhlapäivä: onnittelut ja kunnianosoitukset tasavallan presidentin P. E. Svinhufvudin täyttäessä 70 vuotta. Otava, 1932.
- Martti Häikiö: Suomen leijona: Svinhufvud itsenäisyysmiehenä. Docendo, 2017.

=== References ===
Regnal titles
Preceded by New creation	Regent of Finland; 1918–1919	Succeeded by Carl Gustaf Emil Mannerheim
Political offices
Preceded by New creation	Speaker of the Parliament of Finland; 1907–1912	Succeeded by Oskari Tokoi
Preceded by New creation	Prime Minister of Finland; 1917–1918	Succeeded by Juho Kusti Paasikivi
Preceded by Kyösti Kallio	Prime Minister of Finland; 1930–1931	Succeeded by Juho Sunila
Preceded by Lauri Kristian Relander	President of Finland; 1931–1937	Succeeded by Kyösti Kallio
