= Svinhufvud (family) =

Swedish noble family

Svinhufvud family
- Coat of arms of the Svinhufvud family
- Country: Northern Europe (Finland, Sweden)
- Origin: Dalarna
- Members: Pehr Evind Svinhufvud; Per Gustaf Svinhufvud af Qvalstad

The Svinhufvud family (Finnish pronunciation: [ˈsʋinhufvud]; Finland Swedish pronunciation: [ˈsviːnhʉːvʉd]; Swedish pronunciation: [ˈsvîːnˌhʉːvɵd]; lit. 'Swine head') is an ancient Swedish nobility originating from Dalarna. The family is incorporated both at the Swedish House of Nobility and the Finnish House of Nobility.

A prominent member is P. E. Svinhufvud, President of Finland from 1931 to 1937. Prince Daniel, Duke of Västergötland (né Daniel Westling), the husband of Victoria, Crown Princess of Sweden, shares ancestors very far back in time with this family.

== History ==
The origin of the family can be traced back to a parchment letter from 1386 when a Jöns Swinshwoth (ie Svinshuvud) bought the two farms Höjen and Stenbjörnsarvet (now Stämnarvet ) in Torsångs parish (now Stora Kopparbergs parish) . The text has been partially changed, possibly in connection with the fact that the letter was displayed at the Autumn Parliament in Sundborn in 1673 by, among others, the mountain man Olof Nilsson on Höjen . Investigations of the document indicate, however, that Svinhuvud was there from the beginning.

The miner at Kopparberget, Hans Jönsson (mentioned 1430–1440), like his brother Dan Jönsson, vicar of Hedemora parish 1405–1427, carried a pig's head in his coat of arms.

Hans Jönsson, who was married to Ingeborg Larsdotter, daughter of the subaltern in Västmanland Lars Korske and his wife Cecilia Birgersdotter, was the father of Jöns Hansson, miner at Kopparberget in 1450 and, according to a later statement from Rasmus Ludvigsson, lived at Höjen. Another son was Jeppe Hansson, mentioned 1452-1481, who signed up for Risholn (then in Svärdsjö, later Sundborn parish ). From his son Hans Jeppesson in Risholn (mentioned 1485–1513, died before 1540) and his daughter Margareta Hansdotter, Svinhufvud in Westergötland traces its ancestry . Hans Jeppesson's son, Dalarna bailiff Ingel Hansson, settled at Gylle in Stora Tuna parish and was executed in 1534 for his participation in the Bell Rebellion. His son Nils Ingelsson (died no earlier than 1600) was mayor of Västerås 1575–1595 and from him, through a grandson's son, the Ikornsköld family (extinct at the sword's end 1644) that was introduced to the house of knights is descended from him .

Hans Jönsson's daughter Cecilia, mentioned in 1450, was married to Magnus Henriksson Svart. Their son, the mountain bailiff at Kopparberget Nils Månsson, in turn became the father of Måns Nilsson (Svinhufvud) . From his granddaughter Per Hansson descends the noble family Svinhufvud af Qvalstad . Per Hansson's brother, the district chief Albrekt Hansson (died 1631) in Aspeboda has left behind a large number of descendants in Dalarna and neighboring regions .

Gudlög Hansdotter, mentioned in 1452, daughter of the miner Hans Jönsson above, became, through her marriage to Jeppe Henriksson (Simla) in Karlborn, Svärdsjö parish, petitioner to the noble and countable families Ekeblad (Stola family) .

The miner Hans Jönsson was the father of the miner Jöns Hansson (mentioned 1450–1452) who in turn was the father of the priests Daniel and Timme Jönsson, who when they were enrolled at the University of Rostock in 1465 and 1466 were the first to use the surname Svinhufvud with certainty. Their nephew, Västerås bishop Otto Svinhufvud, also took up the name when he enrolled at the University of Rostock in 1480.

== See also ==
- Per Gustaf Svinhufvud af Qvalstad – the paternal grandfather of P. E. Svinhufvud

== Sources ==
- Berglund, Torsten; Hemström, Elisabeh; Olofsson, Leif; Winroth, Anders (2008). "Om släkten Svinhuvuds ursprung: samt om en misstänkt förfalskning i ett medeltidsbrev från 1386". Släktforskarnas årsbok. 2008: 9–28 : ill. LIBRIS: 12241377..
- Boethius, Bertil; Kopparbergslagen fram till 1570-talets genombrott.
- Ekström, Gunnar; Västerås stifts herdaminne I:1 (1939) s 215-246, 529, I:2 (1948) s 430-431, 519-520, 584.
- Jernberg, Stefan; "Vem var hustru till bergmästaren Hans Jönsson på Kopparberget? Ett bidrag till släkten Svinhufvuds genealogi." Släkt och Hävd 2019:1 sid. 174-181.
- Jernberg, Stefan; "Vem var dalafogden Ingel Hanssons (Svinhuvud) hustru på Gylle?" Släkt och Hävd 2021:3 sid. 194-207.
- Kröningssvärd, Carl Gustaf; Diplomatarium Dalekarlicum (1842-1853).
- Svenskt biografiskt lexikon häfte 171, sid. 23-30. Artikel Svinhufvud, författad av Berglund, Torsten, Gillingstam, Hans och Winroth, Anders.
- Winroth, Anders; "Svinhufvud-ätternas gemensamma ursprung." Släkt och Hävd 2001:2-3 sid. 150-155.
