= Lennart Hohenthal =

Finnish activist and murderer (1877–1951)

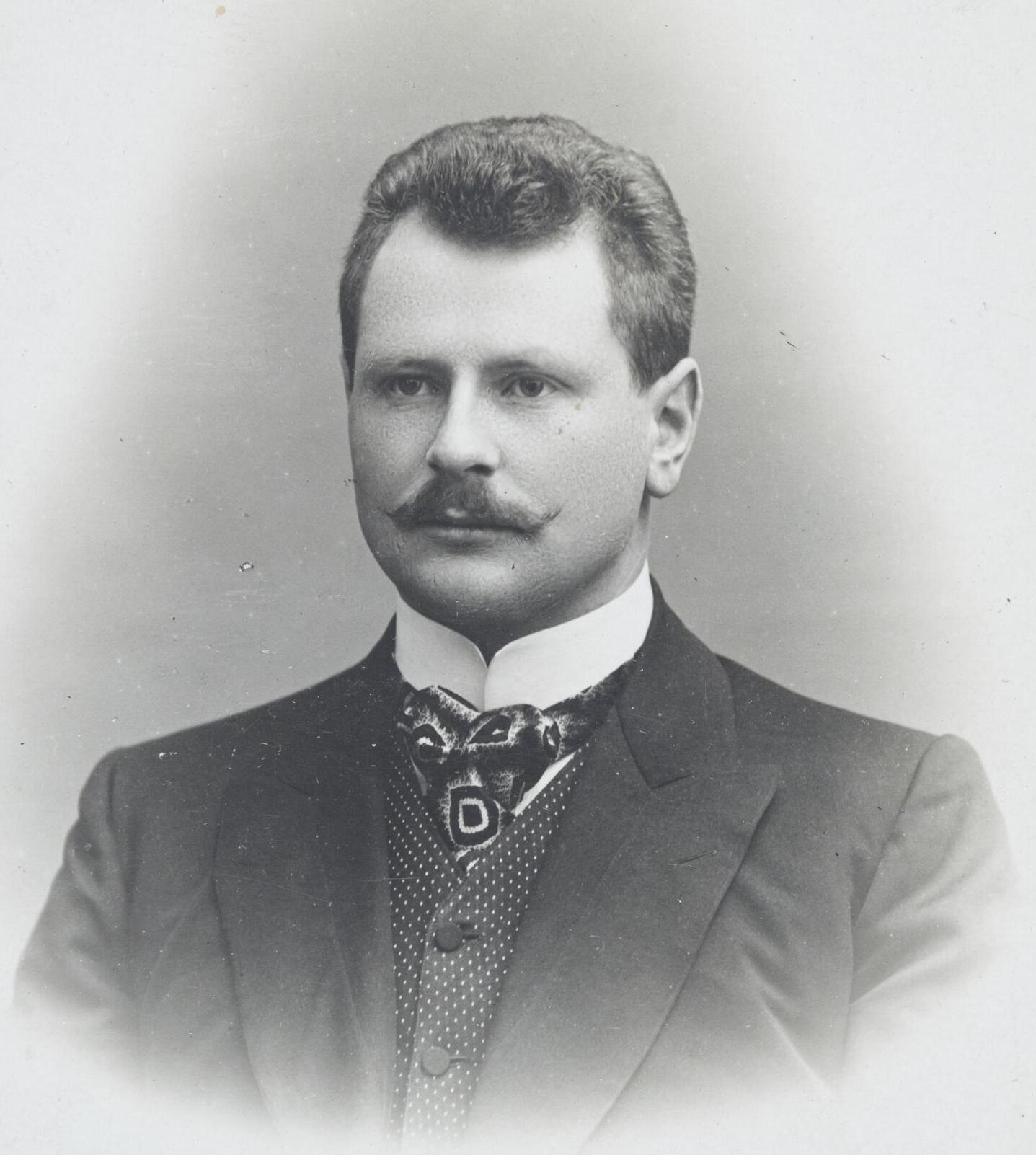
- Born: November 25, 1877; Kuortane, Grand Duchy of Finland, Russian Empire
- Died: August 13, 1951 (aged 74); London, England
- Other name: Eric Alvén (from 1905)
- Occupations: Activist, physiotherapist, businessman
- Known for: Assassination of Eliel Soisalon-Soininen (1905)

Karl Lennart Hohenthal (25 March 1877 – 13 August 1951), known from 1905 as Eric Alvén, was a Finnish activist. Hohenthal became known for assassinating the Procurator Eliel Soisalon-Soininen on 6 February 1905, during the first period of the Russification of Finland. He was sentenced to life imprisonment but escaped from prison in October the same year and travelled via Sweden to England, where he lived the rest of his life under the name Eric Alvén, working as a physiotherapist and businessman.

== Background ==
Lennart Hohenthal was a Finland-Swede and belonged to the German Hohenthal family, which originally came to Finland from Swedish Pomerania during the 18th century. Hohenthal was the eldest son of Klas Emil Hohenthal (born 1846 in Lapua) and Leonie Reichnitz (born 1845 in Stockholm). His father was ordained as a priest in 1871 and served as an assistant pastor and acting vicar in several parishes across Ostrobothnia (including Nurmo, Kuortane, Replot, and Malax). He then served as the vicar in Sideby from 1885 to 1898, in Nivala from 1898 to 1904, and in Laihia from 1904. Lennart Hohenthal was born in Kuortane on November 25, 1877.

Hohenthal attended the Vaasa Lyceum and later studied medicine at the University of Helsinki. (Note: BLF states that he passed the matriculation examination in 1900 but does not specify his field of study. The information about medical studies comes from earlier versions of the Wikipedia article and lacks a verified source.) After his matriculation examination in 1900 he worked as a masseur at the Mariehamn bathing establishment.

== Political activism ==
At the time of Hohenthal's youth, Finland was an autonomous Grand Duchy within the Russian Empire. The February Manifesto of 1899 and the subsequent Russification policies of Governor-General Nikolay Bobrikov curtailed Finnish autonomy and provoked widespread resistance. Like many Finns, Hohenthal initially supported the passive resistance movement. In 1903 he travelled around the Kalajoki deanery on behalf of his ailing father, attempting to persuade local clergymen to refuse to send out conscription lists and to sign a written protest against the call-up, though with meagre results.

The same year, Hohenthal began to distance himself from passive resistance in favour of active measures. By the autumn of 1903 he had come to the conclusion that Governor-General Bobrikov had to be killed in self-defence of Finland. He also sought employment as a police informant, submitting written reports for a monthly fee, hoping in this way to gain insight into the political intelligence apparatus and to learn which persons the police suspected and what actions were being planned.

Hohenthal initially supported passive resistance to the Russification measures. In 1903, acting on behalf of his father, he travelled through Ostrobothnia in an effort to persuade the clergy to oppose military conscription. He urged them to refuse to submit conscription lists and to sign a petition against conscription; however, only a few priests agreed to do so.

In May 1904, Hohenthal drew up a plan to assassinate Bobrikov. He contacted Eugen Schauman, whom he knew from his schooldays in Vaasa, and asked him to take part in the conspiracy. Schauman then revealed that he had already devised his own plan for the assassination, and the two agreed that Schauman would be given until the week before Midsummer to carry out the deed alone; if he failed, Hohenthal's group would take over. Since Schauman succeeded on 16 June 1904, the conspirators had to devise new plans. At the turn of the year 1904–1905, Hohenthal joined the combat organisation of the Finnish Active Resistance Party.

== Assassination of Soisalon-Soininen ==
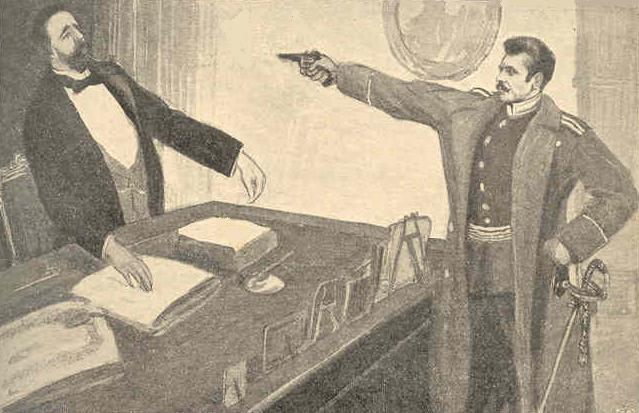
Lennart Hohenthal shoots Procurator Eliel Soisalon-Soininen on 6 February 1905.

The Procurator Eliel Johnsson — who had been ennobled in 1904 but did not have time to adopt his noble name Soisalon-Soininen before his death — was seen by the activists as a symbol of the lawless regime. According to Hohenthal, the Procurator had served as an adviser to the Governor-General in the deportations and other measures directed against Finland. The Procurator of Finland was the highest legal official in the country, comparable to an attorney general or chancellor of justice.

On 6 February 1905, Hohenthal shot and killed Soisalon-Soininen in the Procurator's home in Helsinki. Hohenthal was disguised as a Russian officer, calling himself Lieutenant Alexandre de Gadd from Saint Petersburg, according to a visiting card that had been printed for the occasion. The guard admitted Hohenthal to Soisalon-Soininen's study after a short wait. After the shots, chaos ensued: the victim's wife Emilia Adelaide Louise Grenqvist (1859–1934) tried to save her husband, while their son and the guard, both armed with revolvers, wounded Hohenthal in the hand and leg. Wounded, Hohenthal got no further than the adjoining room, where he collapsed and was shortly afterwards arrested by the police.

At trial, Hohenthal was defended by Pehr Evind Svinhufvud, who later became the third President of Finland. Despite Svinhufvud's defence speech, Hohenthal was sentenced to life imprisonment.

The killing outraged those who supported a conciliatory line towards Russia and was sharply criticised in the newspaper Uusi Suometar, while the Constitutionalists showed greater understanding. However, Hohenthal never became a cult figure comparable to Schauman, whose assassination of Bobrikov had achieved iconic status in Finnish nationalist memory.

== Escape from prison ==
In the provincial prison, Hohenthal received a visit in June 1905 from Alexandra Zetterberg, a woman who moved in activist circles. She conveyed information about an escape plan that his friends at liberty had devised, by writing the message on the cuff of her sleeve.

On 10 October 1905, Hohenthal was freed from the provincial prison on Skatudden in Helsinki by activist friends. One of his friends entered the prison yard at night; Hohenthal lowered a string from his window and was passed a saw, with which he cut through the bars and then lowered himself down by rope. His friends dropped a rope ladder over the prison wall to help him scale it. The 18-year-old Gunnar Björling, later a noted poet, took part in the rescue. The activists then helped Hohenthal flee to Sweden via the so-called Monäs route.

The escape caused a sensation in the press. The Procurator's office investigated the matter and found several deficiencies in the guarding of the prisoner, while the Governor-General concluded that state prisoners would in future have to be held in Russian prisons or in Finnish fortresses, since ordinary prisons were incapable of containing them.

== Life in England ==
Hohenthal later moved to England, where he worked as a physiotherapist and as a businessman under the name Erik Alvén, while quietly continuing to work for Finland's independence. He married Alexandra Zetterberg. In England, Hohenthal also wrote his memoirs and a work about his friend and fellow assassin Eugen Schauman, who on 16 June 1904 succeeded in shooting and killing the Russian Governor-General Nikolai Bobrikov in the Senate House in Helsinki. After Finland's independence, Hohenthal was pardoned by the new Finnish government, but did not return to Finland. He died in London in 1951.

== Works ==
- Memoarer [Memoirs], Stockholm 1908.
- Eugen Schauman. Minnen och anteckningar [Eugen Schauman: Memories and notes], 1925.
