= Göran Schauman =

Finnish actor and sailor (born 1940)

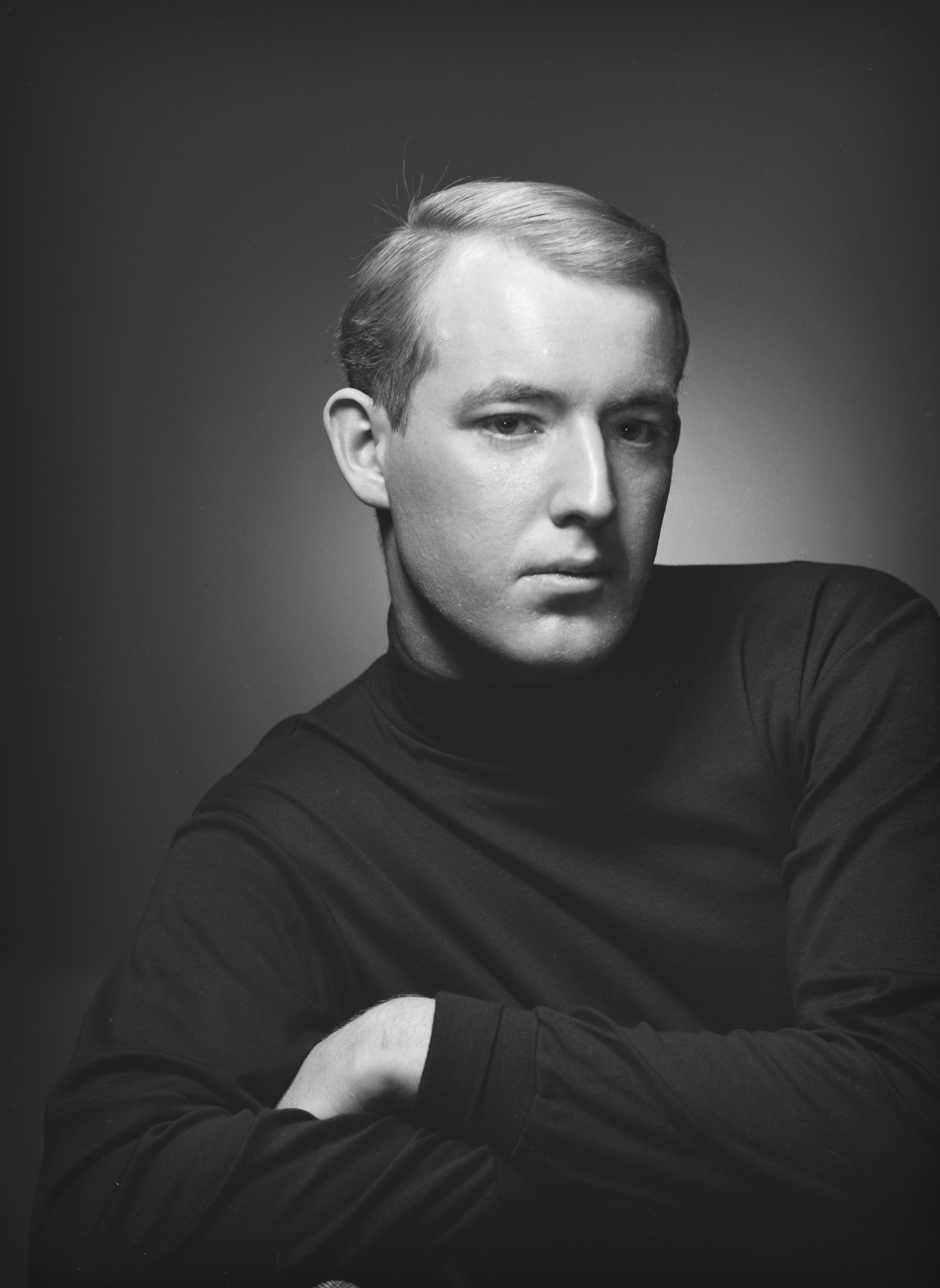
Göran Schauman in 1963

Curt Göran Schauman (born 29 August 1940) is a Finnish actor and former sailor who competed in the 1972 Summer Olympics. He is known for his roles in the films Täällä Pohjantähden alla (2009), Doverie (1976), and Fänrik Ståls sägner (1981).

== Personal life ==
He was born on 29 August 1940 into a Swedish-speaking family in Helsinki, and his father, Runar Schauman, was also an actor. In 1992, Schauman was awarded the Pro Finlandia medal.
