= Frans Rapola =

Finnish politician

Frans Oskar Rapola (23 December 1862, Sääksmäki - 20 March 1910) was a Finnish secondary school teacher and politician. He was a member of the Parliament of Finland from 1907 until his death in 1910, representing the Finnish Party.
