= Paavo Nikula =

Finnish politician (1942–2024)

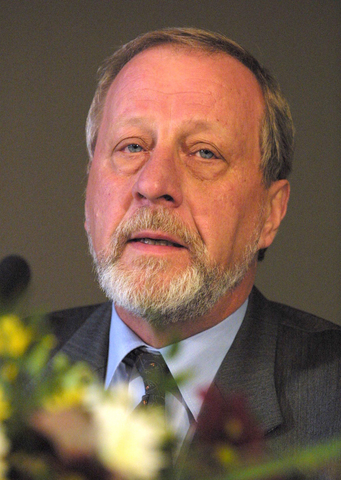
Paavo Nikula

Paavo Nikula (15 August 1942 – 28 December 2024) was a Finnish politician who was Chancellor of Justice of Finland and a Member of Parliament. He was born in Helsinki. He served as the Minister of Justice from 1978 to 1979. He served as Chancellor of Justice from 1998 until his resignation in 2007. During his term, Nikula voiced opposition to a proposal that would allow employers to monitor the emails of their employees (the so-called Lex Nokia). Nikula died on 28 December 2024, at the age of 82.
