= Eliel Soisalon-Soininen =

Finnish politician (1856–1905)

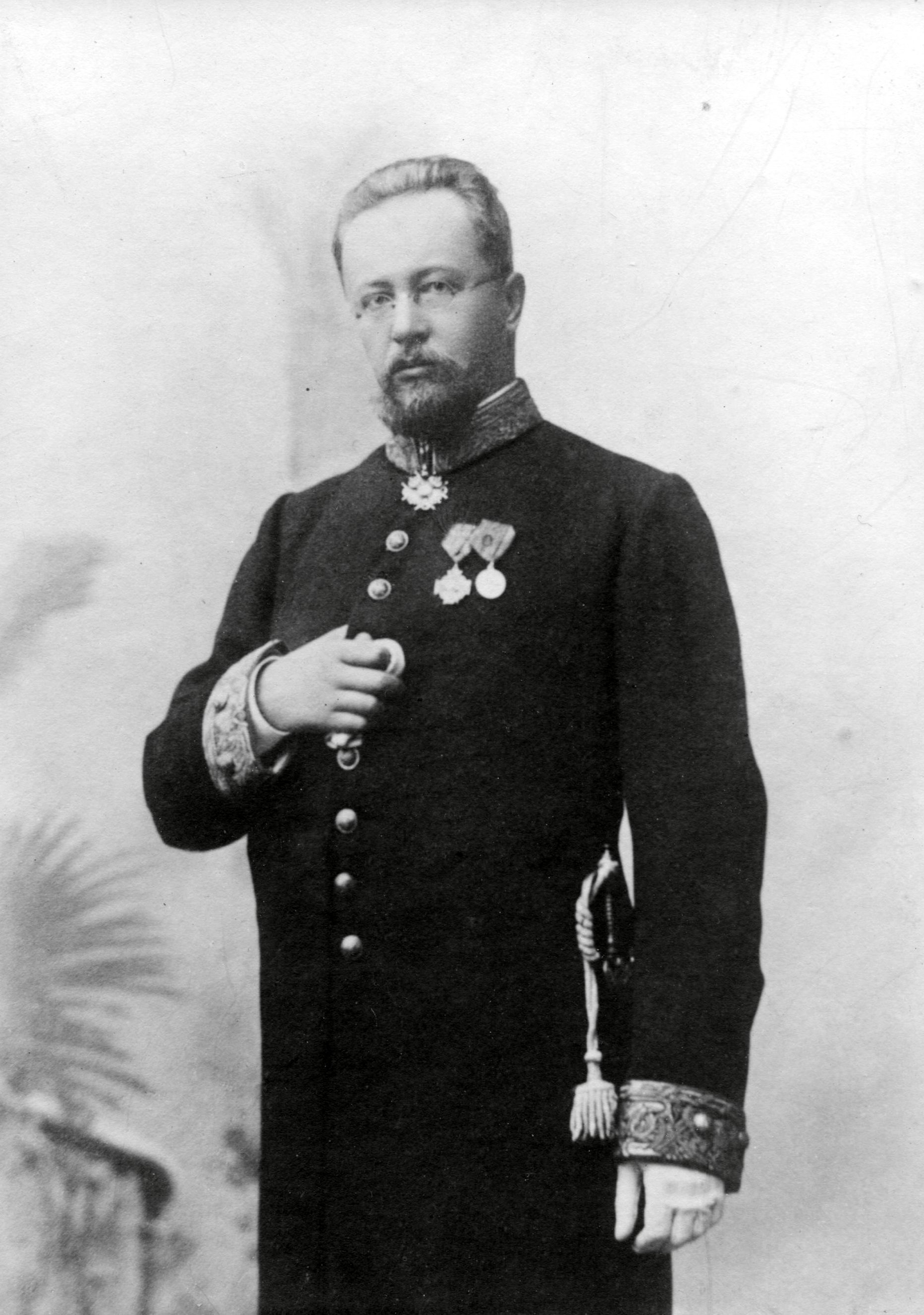

Chancellor of Justice of Finland
- In office 1901–1905

Personal details
- Born: Johan Mårten Eliel Johnsson; May 26, 1856 Pielisjärvi, Grand Duchy of Finland, Russian Empire
- Died: February 6, 1905 (aged 48) Helsinki, Finland
- Cause of death: Assassination (gunshot wounds)

Johan Mårten Eliel Soisalon-Soininen (born Johnsson, raised to the nobility as Soisalon-Soininen; 26 May 1856 – 6 February 1905) was a Chancellor of Justice of Finland. Soisalon-Soininen was assassinated in 1905 at his apartment in Helsinki by a young student, Lennart Hohenthal.

== Early life and career ==
Johnsson was born in Pielisjärvi, and graduated from the Kuopion lyseon lukio (in Kuopio) on 5 June 1875. He obtained his law degree in 1879. Johnsson worked in the Vyborg Courts of Appeal from 1879. He received the title of varatuomari in 1882. Soisalon worked at the senate's justice apartment from 1900 and as Chancellor of Justice from 1901 until his death.

Eliel Johnsson was raised to nobility in 1904, together with other members of the Old Finns Party who supported a policy of appeasement toward Russification. He was not introduced to the Finnish House of Nobility before his death and therefore never assumed the noble surname Soisalo-Soininen.

== Assassination ==
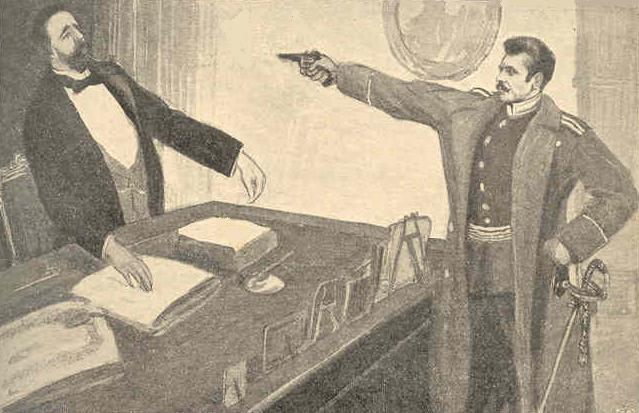
Assassination of Eliel Soisalon-Soininen by Lennart Hohenthal, 6 February 1905

In the morning at 10.30 AM a young man of a heavy build (Hohenthal) dressed as a Russian officer came to Soisalon-Soininen's apartment in Helsinki. Having deceived the police posted outside, Hohenthal rang the doorbell and a valet, in fact a disguised policeman, opened the door. Hohenthal gave the valet a business card which read Alexander De Gadd, Lieutenant de la Garde, St. Petersbourg. Hohenthal asked if he could meet the chancellor. The valet guided him to the chancellor's office.

When Soisalon-Soininen came to the room, Hohenthal pulled a pistol and fired eight shots towards the chancellor of justice, two of which struck the chancellor in the chest and stomach.

The chancellor of justice fell to the floor. Then the valet entered the room and shot at the assassin. During the exchange of fire between the assassin and policeman, the 17-year-old Johan (Juhani), who was the son of Soisalon-Soininen, came to the room and joined the policeman in firing upon the assassin.

Hohenthal shot Johan in the leg. Hohenthal also received some small injuries and surrendered. He was taken to hospital under guard.
