= Rapola Hill Fort =

Coordinates: 61°12′20″N 024°03′25″E

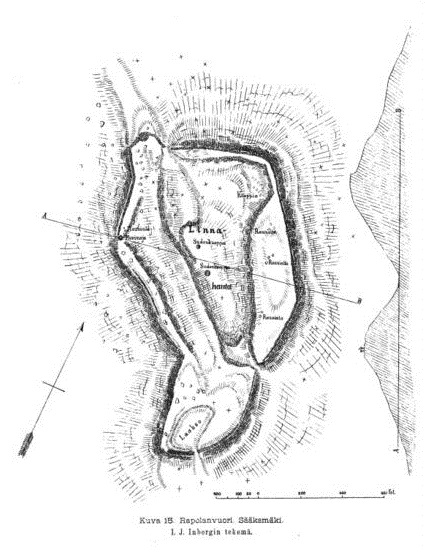
Topographic map of the Rapola Hill Fort. Drawing by I. J. Ingberg (1835-1893), originally published in the 1891 thesis "Suomen muinaislinnat" by Hjalmar Appelgren.

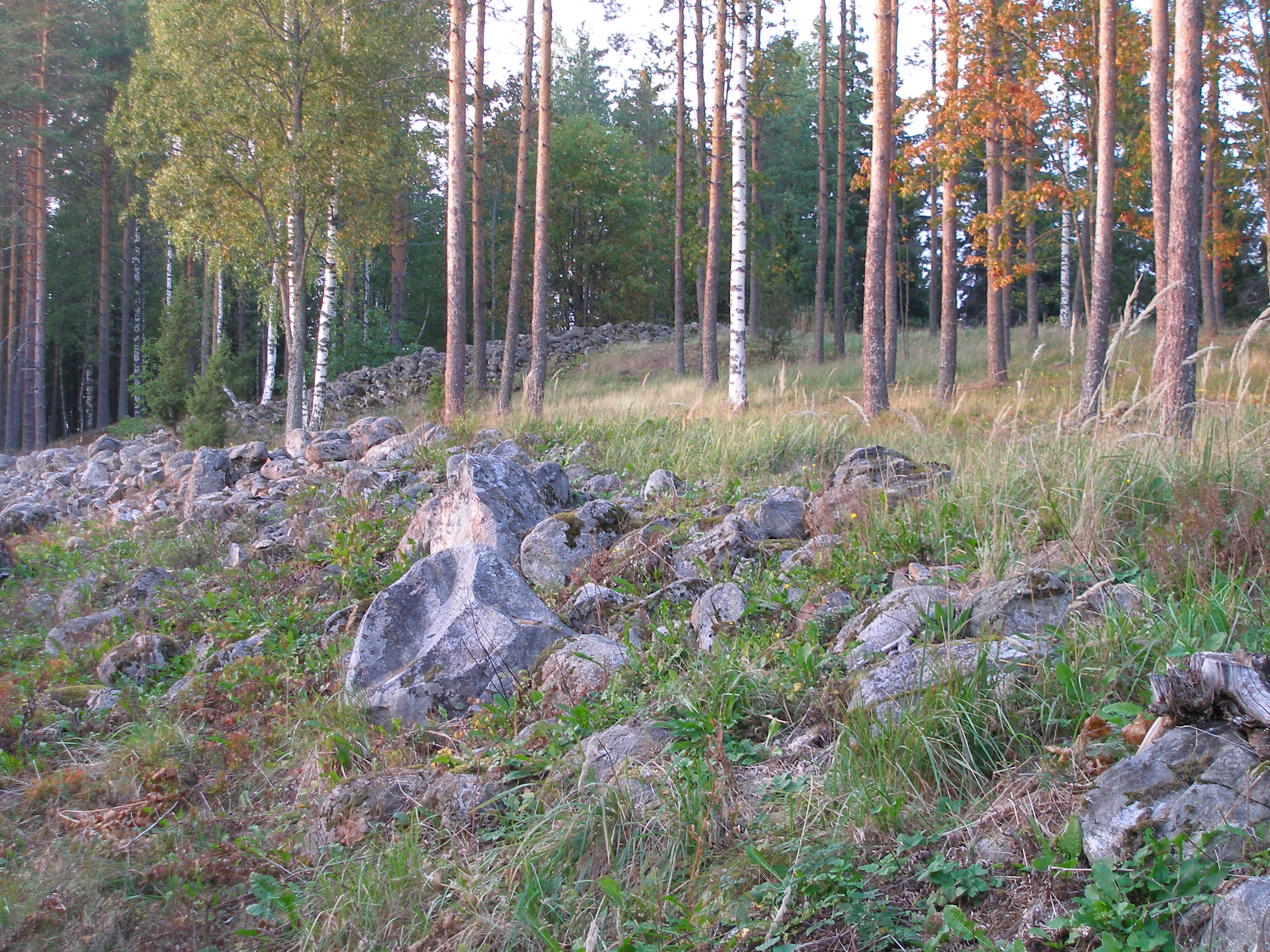
Ruins of the one kilometer long walls of Rapola Hill Fort.

Rapola Hill Fort (Finnish: Rapolan linnavuori) is a hill fort in Sääksmäki in the municipality of Valkeakoski, Finland. Its walls have circled an area of 58 000 square meters and it is the biggest hill fort found in Finland.

In 1921 senator and archaeologist Julius Ailio raised the question in his article if the fort had been the main fort of Tavastians. This view has also faced criticism later. According to excavations, the fort seems to have been in operation at least during the 13th and 15th centuries. This timing gives the postulation that it was built by the inhabitants in their struggles against invading Novgorodians and Swedes. Parts of it may be even earlier, since the area has been inhabited already in the 7th century. In excavations there have been found 80 depressions that have been interpreted as a place of residence and 13 places of hearths. Only one percent of the area of the hill fort has been excavated.

A Papal Bull from 1340 mentions a person named Cuningas de Rapalum (King of Rapala) in a list of peasants who refused to pay taxes to the Catholic Church. The medieval Sääksmäki church is located nearby. The fort was partly constructed on a natural hill that was eventually entirely fortified. Remains of the earth walls are still visible. The fort was 400 meters long and 200 meters wide.
