= Lavia, Finland =

Lavia
- Former municipality
- Lavian kunta Lavia kommun
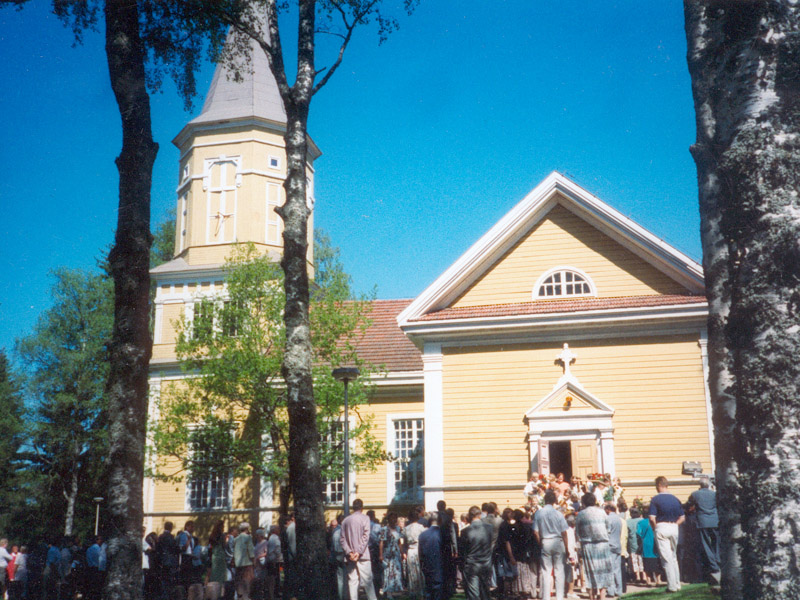
- Lavia Church

- Coat of arms

- Location of Lavia in Finland
- Coordinates: 61°36′N 022°35′E
- Country: Finland
- Region: Satakunta
- Sub-region: Northern Satakunta sub-region
- Charter: 1868
- Merged: 2015

Government
  - Municipal manager: Pekka Heinonen

Area
  - Total: 357.75 km^{2} (138.13 sq mi)
  - Land: 321.13 km^{2} (123.99 sq mi)
  - Water: 36.62 km^{2} (14.14 sq mi)

Population (2014-11-30)
  - Total: 1,904
  - Density: 5.929/km^{2} (15.36/sq mi)
- Time zone: UTC+2 (EET)
  - Summer (DST): UTC+3 (EEST)
- Website: www.lavia.fi

Lavia is a former municipality in the region of Satakunta, in Finland. It was merged with the city of Pori on 1 January 2015.

The municipality was unilingually Finnish.

== People born in Lavia ==
- Frans Mustasilta (1879 – 1949)
- Arvo Riihimäki (1891 – 1972)
- Pentti Antila (1926 – 1997)
- Jaakko Jonkka (1953 – 2022)
