= Chancellor of Justice (Finland) =

Finnish government official

Chancellor of Justice of the Government of Finland

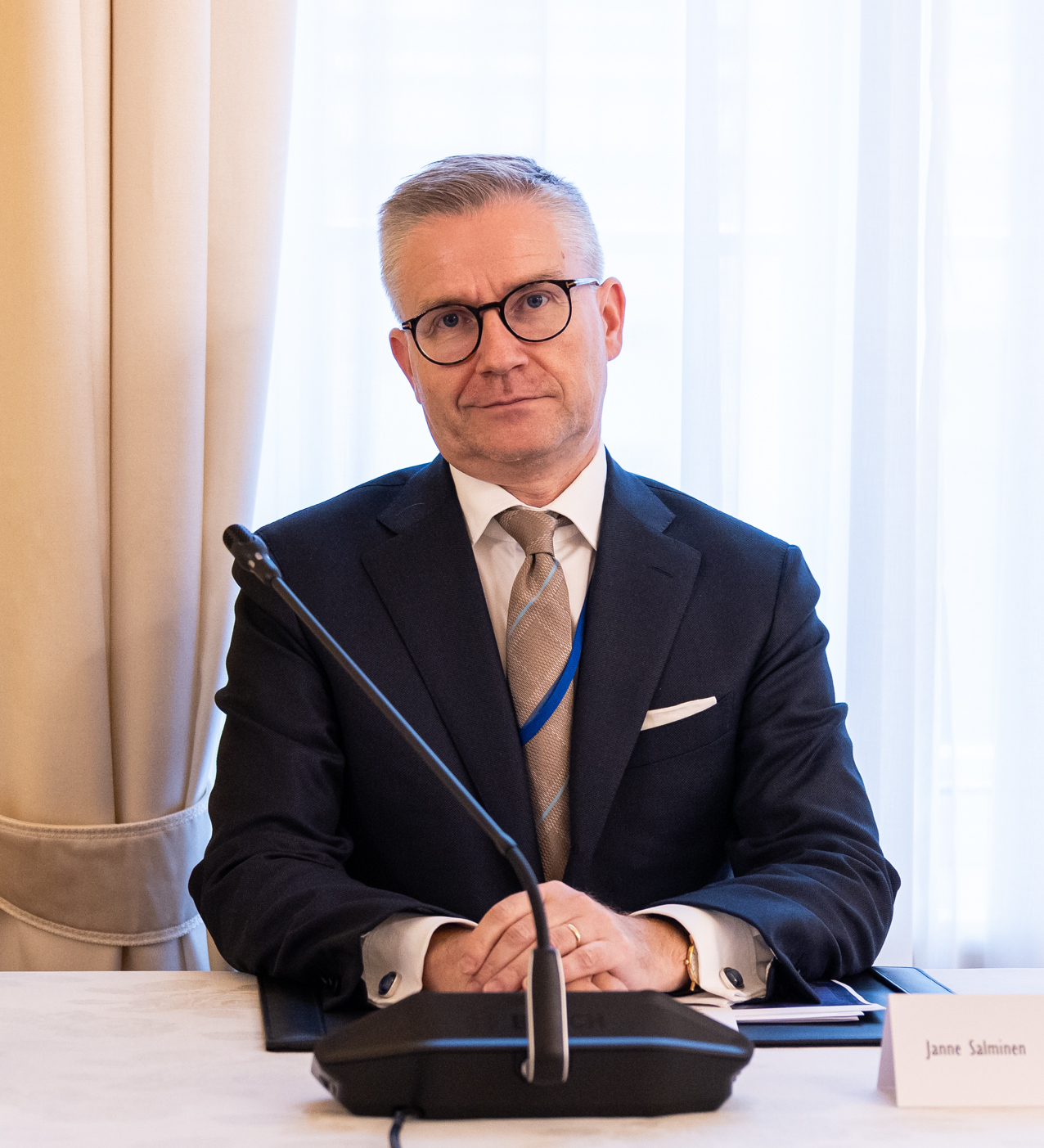
- Incumbent; Janne Salminen since 1.9.2025
- Office of the Chancellor of Justice
- Appointer: President of Finland
- Term length: Life
- Constituting instrument: Constitution of Finland
- Formation: 1917
- First holder: P. E. Svinhufvud
- Website: https://oikeuskansleri.fi

The Chancellor of Justice (Finnish: oikeuskansleri, Swedish: justitiekanslern), officially Chancellor of Justice of the Government of Finland, is a Finnish government official who supervises authorities', such as cabinet ministers', courts, prosecutors, and the president, compliance with the law and advances legal protection of Finnish citizens. The chancellor is jointly with the parliamentary ombudsman the highest overseer of legality in Finland and is vested with substantial investigation, oversight, and prosecution powers.

The chancellor and a deputy are appointed by the President of Finland. The incumbent Chancellor of Justice is Janne Salminen who assumed office on the 1st of September 2025. The chancellor has a life term.

== History ==
The Office of the Chancellor of Justice dates back to the 18th century, when Finland was part of the Kingdom of Sweden. When Finland was annexed by the Russian Empire in 1809 as an autonomous Grand Duchy, the legal system largely remained the same. The functions of the Chancellor of Justice, however, were assigned to the procurator, who assisted the Governor-General in supervising obedience to the law.

A year after Finland declared its independence in 1917, the title and office of Chancellor of Justice was re-established. The first incumbent of this restored institution was Pehr Evind Svinhufvud, who had served as the speaker of the Parliament and who was later to become the third President of Finland. In 1919, a post of parliamentary ombudsman was created. The Ombudsman and the Chancellor of Justice share many duties.

== Duties and powers ==
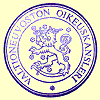
Official seal of the chancellor of justice

The main duty of the chancellor is investigating complaints against official acts of the Government, President of the Republic, and other authorities such as courts and prosecutors other than those supervised by the Parliamentary Ombudsman. They may also start an investigation of their own initiative. The chancellor also attends cabinet meetings to ensure that legal procedures and regulations are followed by providing comments and if necessary publicly dissenting. Additionally the chancellor may give advisory opinions to the Government and the President on bills and other matters before them. Lastly the chancellor supervises the Finnish Bar Association.

Where the chancellor finds law has been broken they may issue a warning or, in severe cases, press criminal charges, not withstanding government ministers. In the case of government ministers the chancellor must refer the matter to the Constitutional Law Committee.

== List of Chancellors ==
Chancellor of Justice	In Office
P. E. Svinhufvud	1917–1918
Axel Fredrik Charpentier	1918–1928
Urho Castrén	1928–1929
Albert von Hellens	1930
Albert Makkonen	1930–1933
Oiva Huttunen	1933–1944
Toivo Tarjanne	1944–1950
Carl Gustaf Möller	1950–1955
Olavi Honka	1956–1961
Antti Hannikainen	1961–1964
Aarne Nuorvala	1964–1965
Jaakko Enäjärvi	1965–1970
Risto Leskinen	1970–1982
Kai Korte	1982–1986
Jorma S. Aalto	1986–1998
Paavo Nikula	1998–2007
Jaakko Jonkka	2007–2017
Risto Hiekkataipale	2017–2018 (acting)
Tuomas Pöysti	2018–2025
Janne Salminen	2025–present

Deputy Chancellors of Justice	In Office
Knut Immanuel Savonius	1918–1926
Urho Castrén	1926–1928
Eino Johannes Ahla	1928–1933
Carl Gustaf Möller	1933–1950
Antti Juhana Hannikainen	1950–1956
Eero Johannes Manner	1956–1965
Reino Markus Lindroos	1965–1971
Jorma S. Aalto	1971–1974
Antti Okko	1974–1981
Jukka Pasanen	1981–2001
Jaakko Jonkka	2001–2007
Mikko Puumalainen	2007–2014
Risto Hiekkataipale	2014–2017
Kimmo Hakonen	2017
Mikko Puumalainen	2018–2026
Petri Martikainen	2026–present

== See also ==
- Judicial system of Finland
- Government of Finland
- Chancellor of Justice
- Ombudsman
