= Coat of arms of Jakobstad =

Coat of arms of Jakobstad

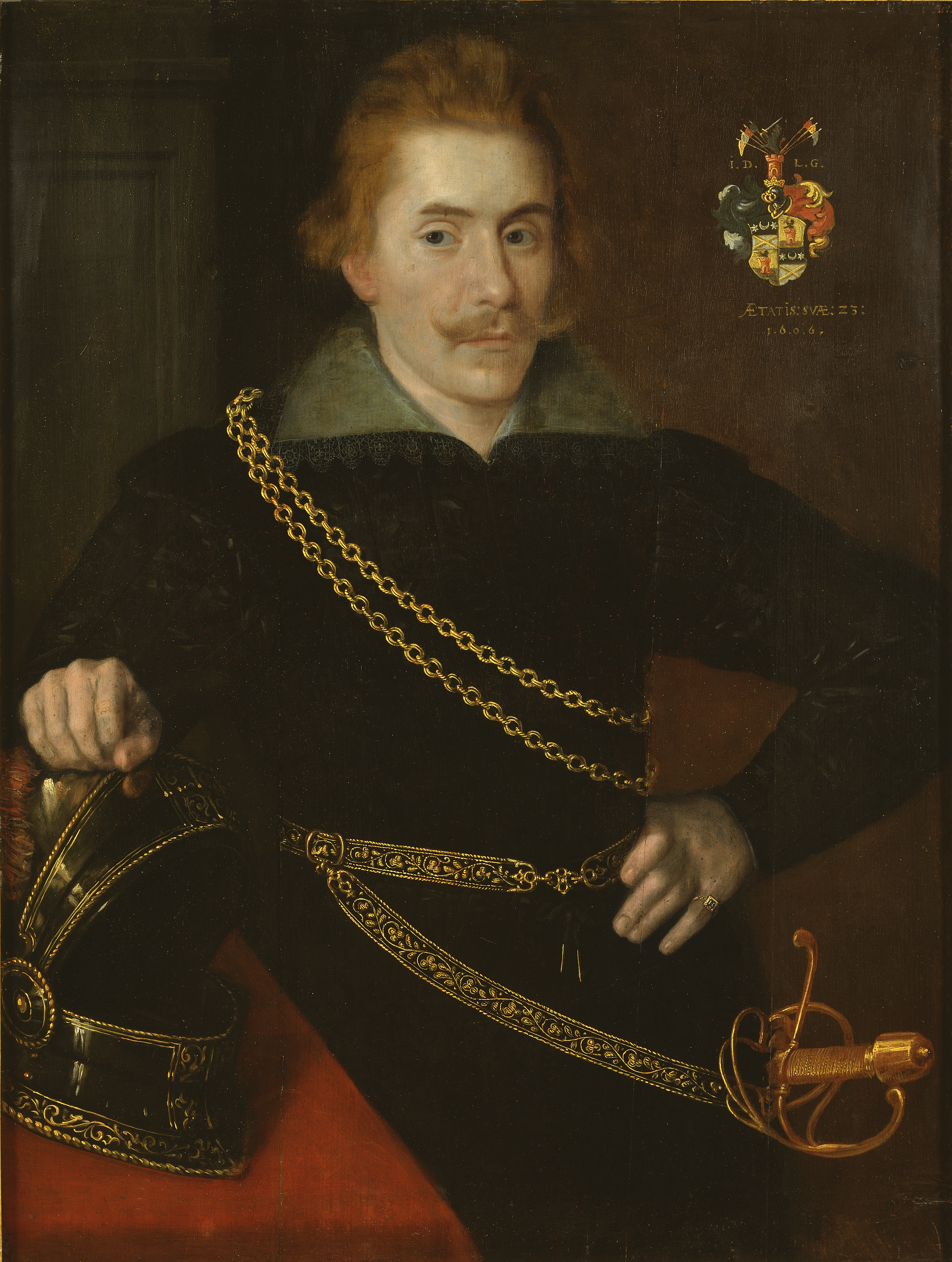
Jacob de la Gardie

Jakobstad, a town in Finland, has a coat of arms that was drawn in its current form by Gustaf von Numers. It portrays a red-crowned, sword-holding a blue lion with a split tail. The lion is standing in a red tower in blue water. The background is gold-colored. The shield is crowned by a baronial coronet.

The origin lies in the coat of arms of the Swedish noble family de la Gardie, and can be seen in the second and third fields of the coat of arms depicted in a painting of Jacob de la Gardie by an unknown artist.

The Swedish name for the coat of arms of Jakobstad (Jakobstads vapen) has also been used for a ketch rigged vessel galeas replica called the Jacobstads Wapen.
