= Grahn, Hedman & Wasastjerna =

Finnish architectural firm

Grahn, Hedman & Wasastjerna was an architecture firm working in Helsinki, the capital of Finland, between 1892 and 1905.

== History ==
The firm was founded in Helsinki by the young architects Karl Gustaf Grahn (1866–1907), Ernst Hedman (1867–1933) and Knut Wasastjerna (1867–1935) in 1892. It quickly established itself as one of the leading architectural firms of the city. The firm worked mainly in Helsinki but also designed buildings for a few other towns in Finland. At one point the firm was the largest in Finland.

== Representative works ==
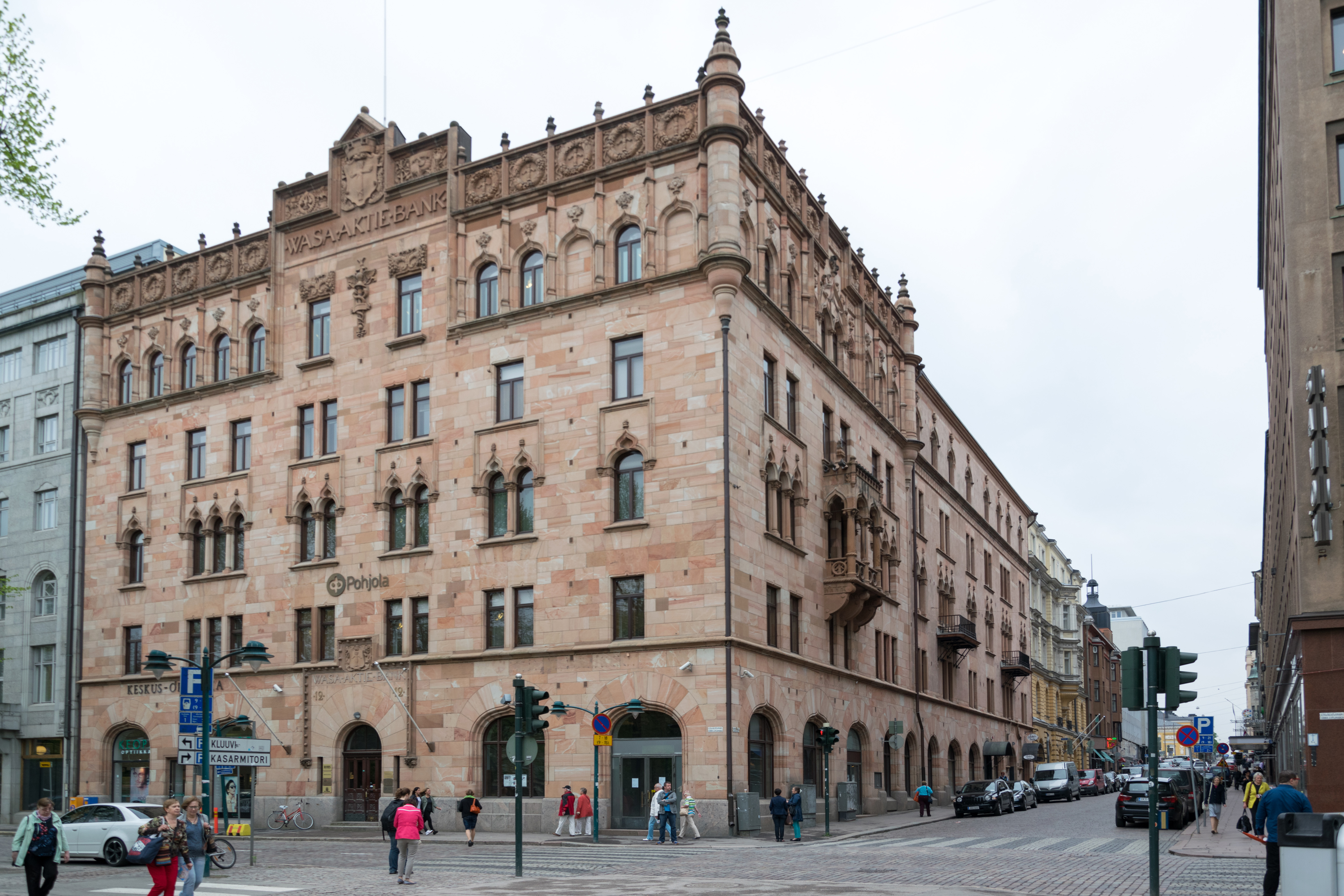
Wasa Aktiebank Building (1899)

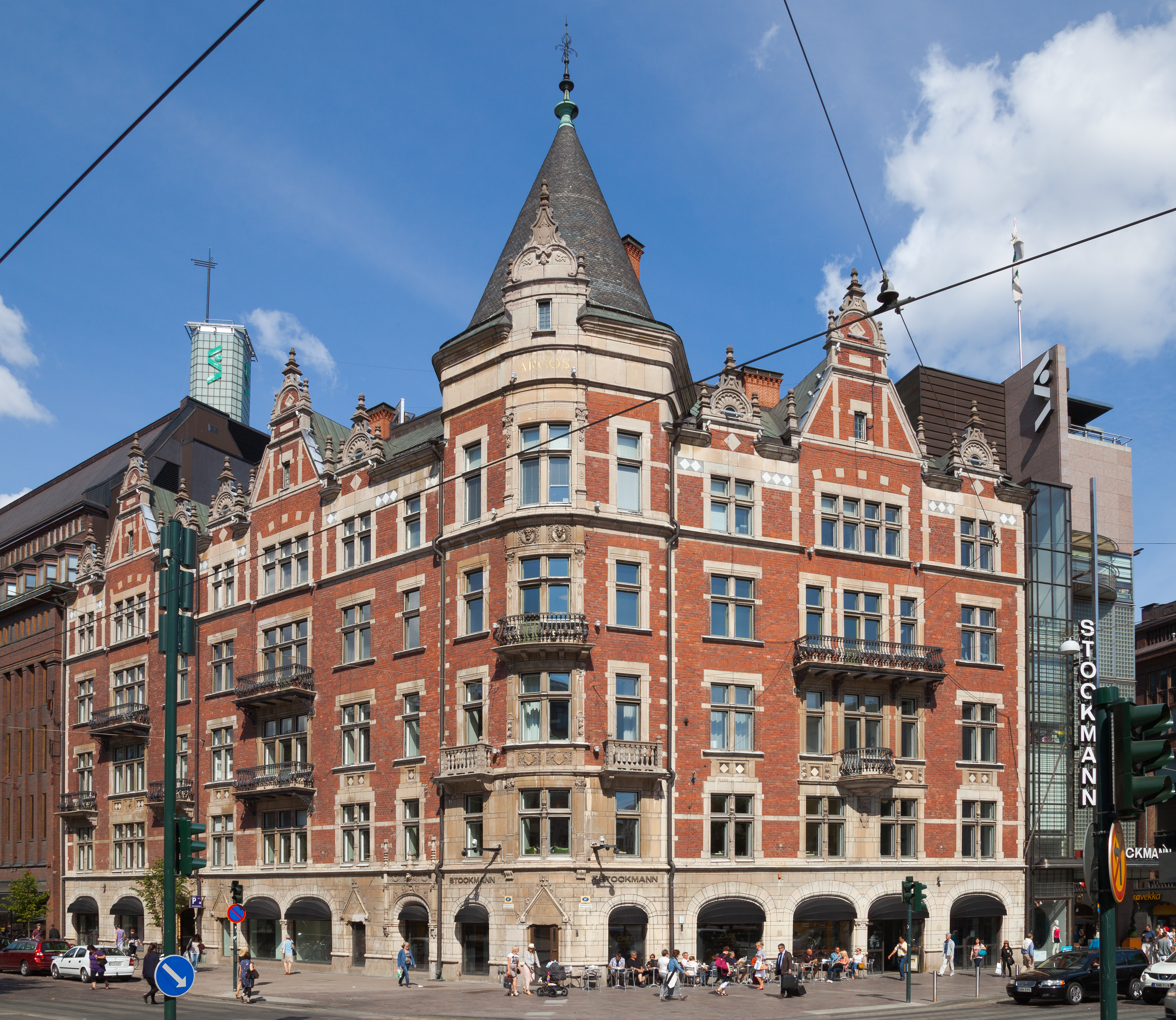
Argos Building (1896)

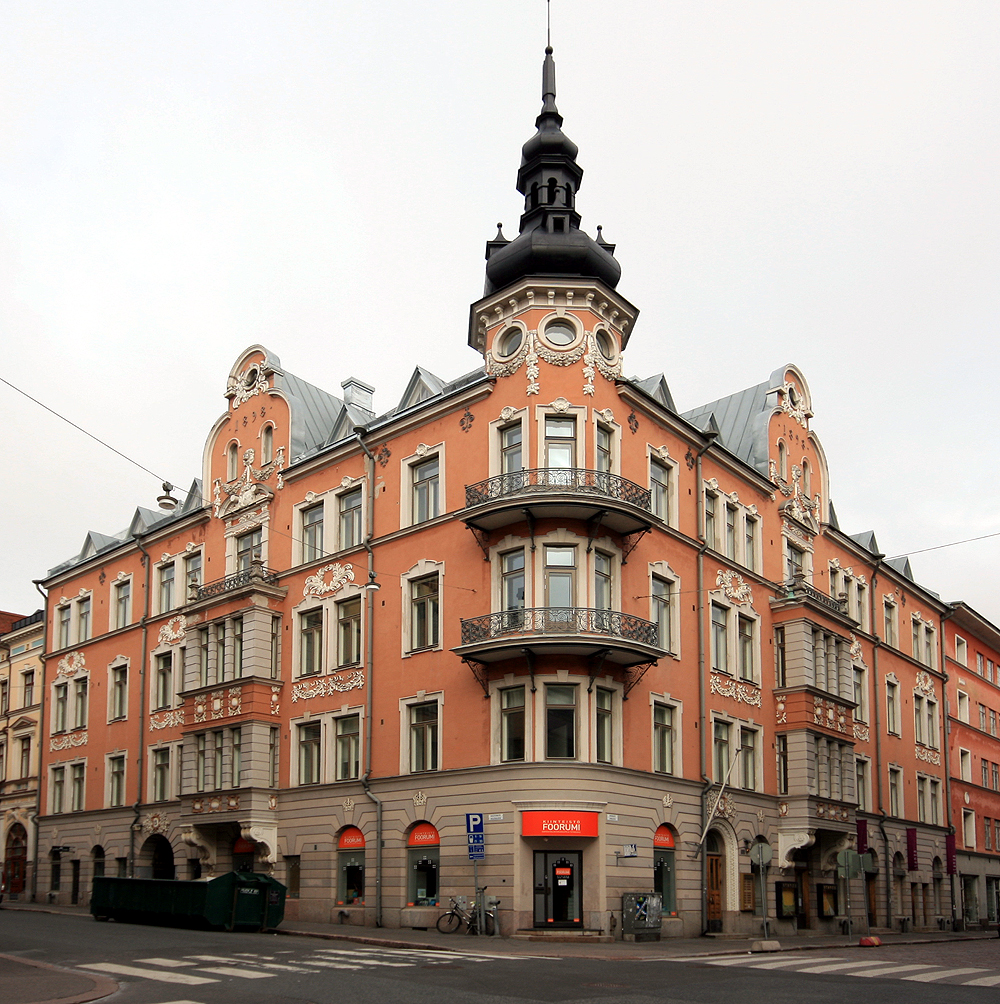
Building of the Real Estate Union of Finland (1898)

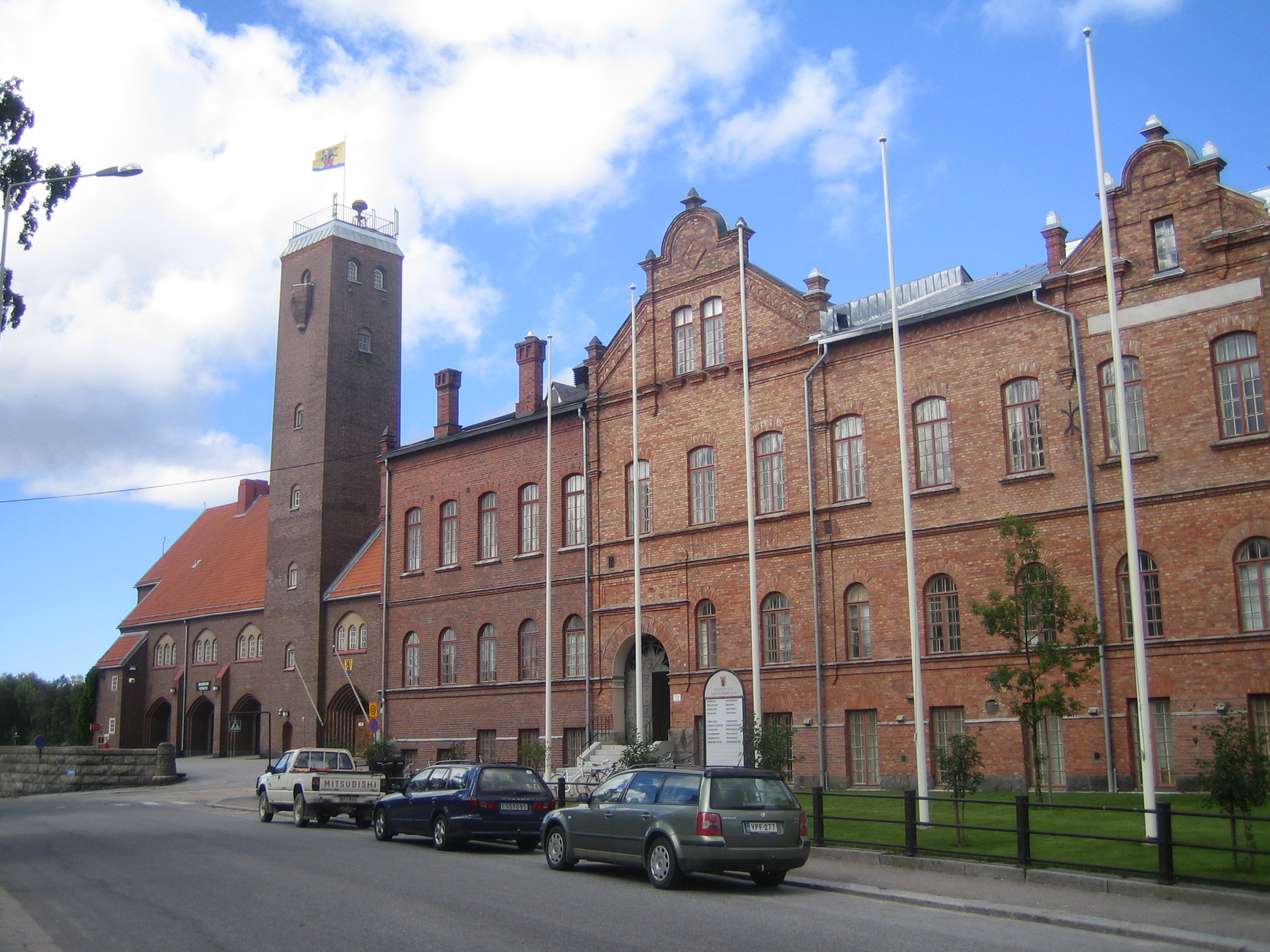
Strengberg Tobacco Factory, Jakobstad (1896)

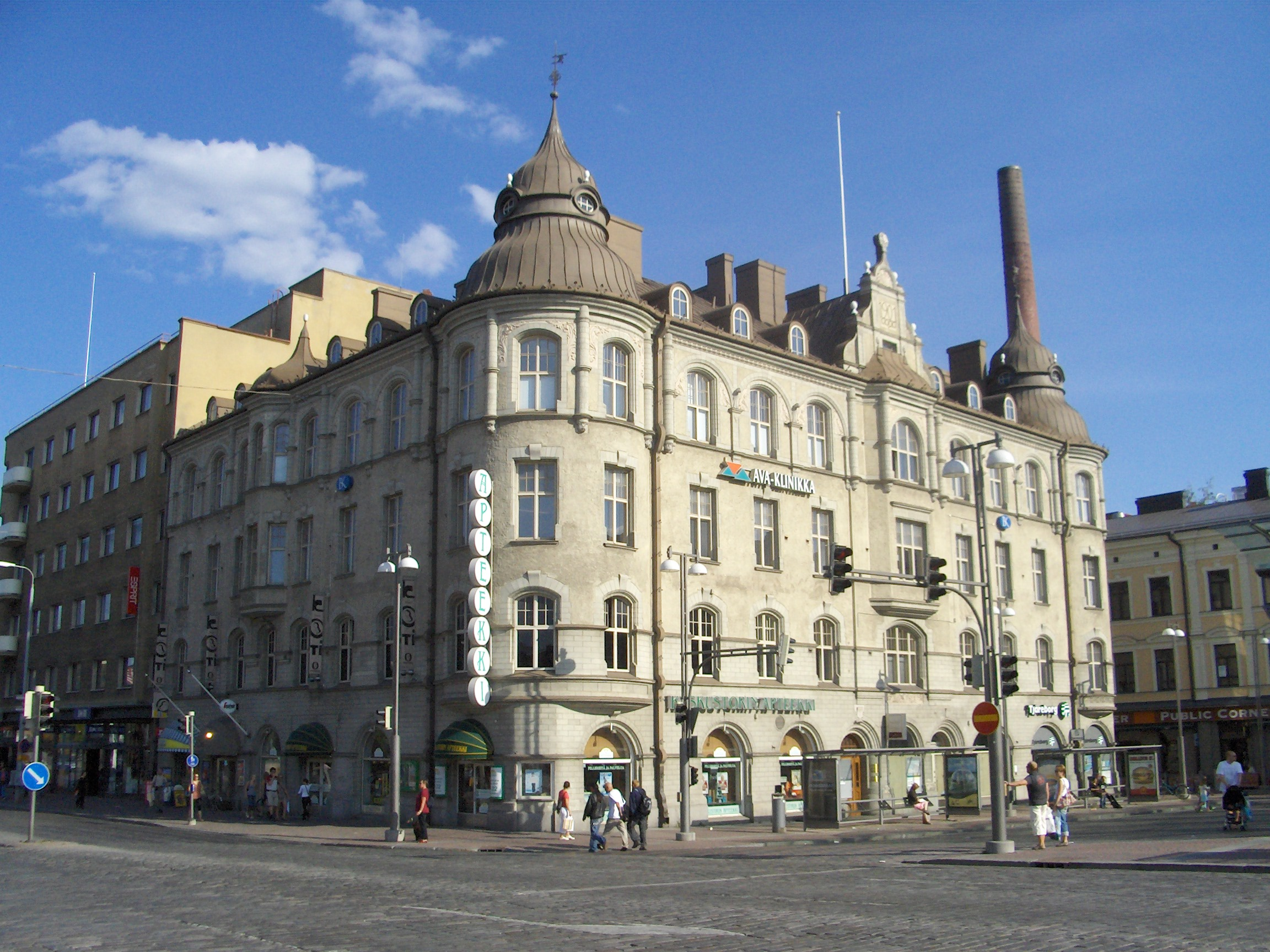
Sumelius Building, Tampere (1901)
