= Malm (disambiguation) =

Malm may refer to:

== Places ==
- Malm, a village in Steinkjer Municipality in Trøndelag county, Norway
- Malm Municipality, a former municipality in the old Nord-Trøndelag county, Norway
- Malmi, Helsinki, a district of Helsinki, Finland
- Malmi, Pyhtää, a village in Pyhtää, Finland
- Malmö, a city in Sweden

== Other uses ==
- Malm (geology), a name indicating rocks of Late Jurassic age
- Malm (surname)
- Master Air Loadmaster (MALM), a rank in the Royal Air Force
