= Lindskog =

Lindskog is a Swedish surname. Notable people with the surname include:

- Adolf Lindskog (1751–1836), Swedish-Finnish businessman and shipbuilder
- Agneta Lindskog (born 1953), Swedish luger
- Anders Lindskog (1875–1917), Swedish sport shooter
- Bengt Lindskog (1933–2008), Swedish footballer
- Doug Lindskog (born 1955), Canadian ice hockey player
- Gustafva Lindskog (1794–1851), Swedish gymnast
- Vic Lindskog (1914–2003), American football player
- Gustaf Lindskog (born 1977), Swedish investor
