= Malm (surname) =

Malm is a surname. Notable people with the surname include:

- August Wilhelm Malm (1821–1882), Swedish biologist
- Andreas Malm (born 1976/1977), Swedish author and professor of human ecology
- Carl Oscar Malm (1826–1863), Finnish teacher of the deaf and father of Finnish Sign Language
- Edward Malm (1899–1983), Swedish Army lieutenant general
- Esko Malm (born 1940), Finnish footballer and football manager
- Mona Malm (1935–2021), Swedish film, stage, and television actress
- Niina Malm, Finnish politician
- Peter Malm (1800–1868), Finnish ship owner
- Otto Malm (1838–1898), Finnish shipowner (son of Peter Malm)
