= Gustaf von Numers =

Finnish artist and heraldist (1912–1978)

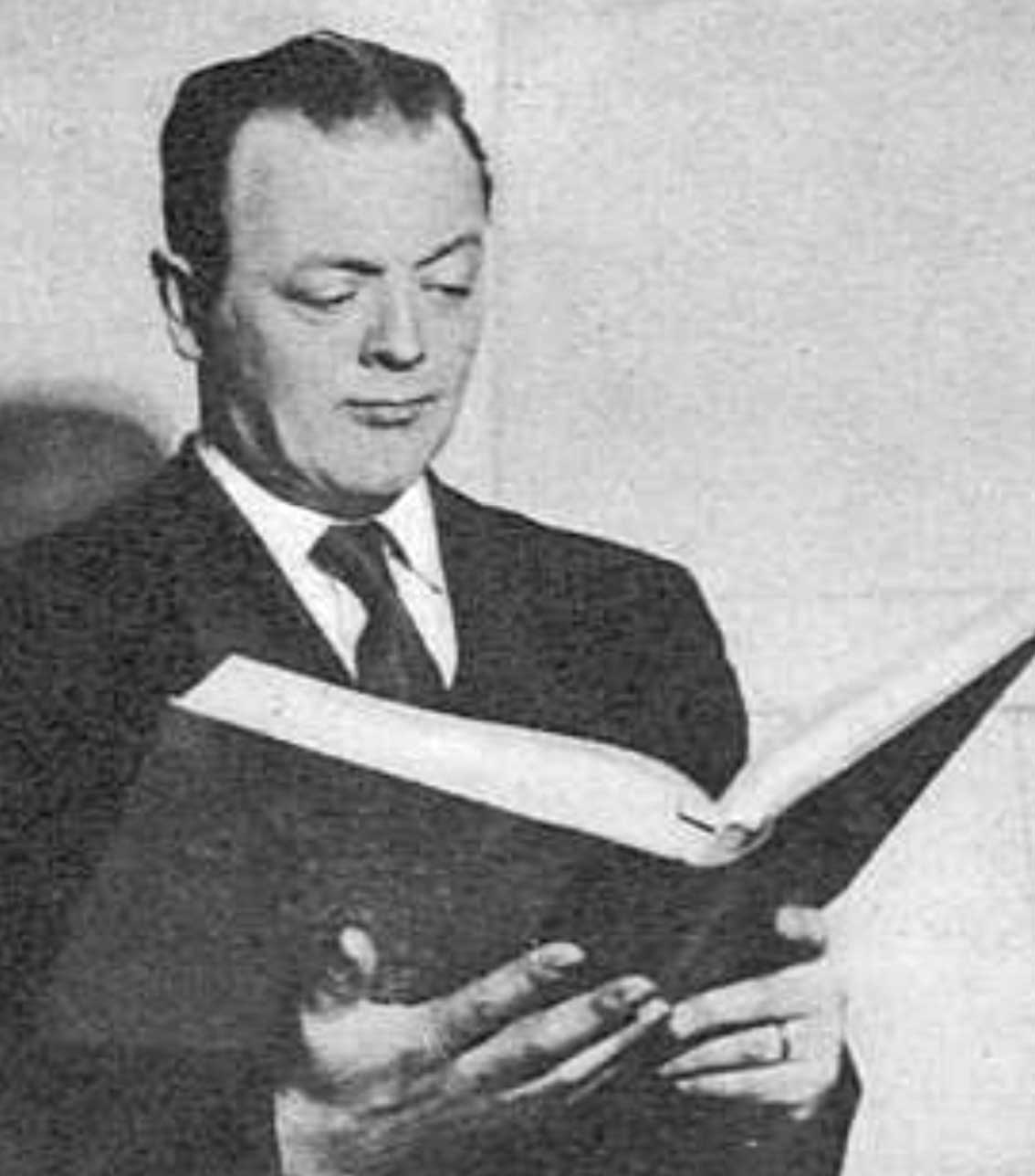
- Born: 31 July 1912; Kangasala, Finland
- Died: 21 May 1978 (aged 65); Helsinki, Finland
- Occupation(s): Civil servant; heraldic artist

Gustaf von Numers (31 July 1912 – 21 May 1978) was a Swedish-speaking Finnish civil servant and leading heraldic artist.

== Life ==
Gustaf von Numers studied heraldry in the 1930s under Arvid Berghman and was considered one of the leading Finnish experts in the area. He was a tireless writer on all heraldic matters. Together with colleagues in the field, he contributed to the initiation of the parliamentary law on communal coats of arms in 1949.

Von Numers designed several communal coats of arms (including Jakobstad, Porvoo and Varpaisjärvi), military banners and personal and family heraldic signs. Von Numers was a founding member of the Finnish Heraldic Society and its first chairman (1957 – 1964), as well as a member of the International Heraldic Academy (Académie Internationale d'Héraldique) from its founding in 1949.

The playwright Gustaf von Numers was a distant cousin.

== Prix Gustaf von Numers ==
In 1982, the international award Gustav von Numers Prize for heraldic art and design was created in memory of Gustaf von Numers. It is awarded to individuals for their merits in heraldic design and art.
