= Otto Malm =

Otto Malm may refer to:

- Otto Malm (businessman) (1838-1898), Finnish shipping magnate
- Otto Malm (footballer) (1890-1969), Swedish footballer
