= KWH Group =

Finnish multi-industry company

KWH Group Ltd
- Native name: Finnish: KWH-yhtymä Oy; Swedish: KWH-koncernen Ab
- Type: Private
- Industry: Conglomerate
- Founded: 1929; 97 years ago
- Founder: Emil Höglund
- Headquarters: Vaasa, Finland
- Key people: Björn Höglund, Chairman; Kjell Antus, President; Stefan Sjöberg (Mirka); Joakim Laxåback (KWH Logistics); Mika Halvorsen (KWH Freeze); Marko Nylund (Prevex)
- Products: Abrasives, logistics services, real estate holdings, plastic plumbing products
- Revenue: 631 million euros (2025)
- Net income: 41.9 million euro (2025)
- Number of employees: 2,697 (2025)
- Website: www.kwhgroup.com/en/

KWH Group Ltd (in Finnish: KWH-yhtymä Oy, in Swedish: KWH-koncernen Ab) is a Finnish family-owned company based in Ostrobothnia. It manufactures and markets abrasives, and plastic products (water traps) and provides forwarding and logistics services, including cold storage of food. It is headquartered in Vaasa, Finland.

The company was formed in 1984 when Oy Keppo Ab, founded by Emil Höglund, bought the shares of Oy Wiik & Höglund Ab, founded by Höglund and Edvin Wiik in 1929. In 2024 KWH Group was the 122nd largest Finnish company in turnover and the 78th largest employer.

== History ==
=== Wiik & Höglund 1929–1983 ===
Emil Höglund and Edvin Wiik founded Wiik & Höglund on 28 August 1929 to engage in trade in round timber, pit props and pulpwood.

In the late 1930s, the company expanded rapidly and became one of Finland's major round timber exporters. By 1939, Wiik & Höglund was the country's biggest timber exporter, accounting for 26 percent of all lumber exports and around 20 percent of pulpwood exports.

In 1939, Wiik & Höglund became a shareholder in Vasa Rederi Ab, active in stevedoring and forwarding.

During the war years, Wiik & Höglund exports were virtually halted. After the war, exports of round timber resumed and the company's previous customers in West Germany, France and the Netherlands again became the main trading partners. Earnings were re-invested into fixed assets, particularly forest.

In 1951, the company expanded into the plastics industry. Wiik & Höglund started producing plastic pipes in 1955. It was also the first company in Finland to manufacture expanded polystyrene sheets.

During the 1960s, Wiik & Höglund withdrew from the timber industry and shipping business to concentrate on plastics. It acquired its Jakobstad-based competitor Oy Nars Ab. In 1969, together with Oy Finlayson Ab, it purchased polyethylene pipe manufacturer Muovitehdas Oy in Ulvila. Wiik & Höglund focused on developing plastic pipes with increasing diameters, becoming the first in the world in 1964 to produce a pipe with a diameter of 600 mm.

=== Oy Keppo Ab 1954–1983 ===
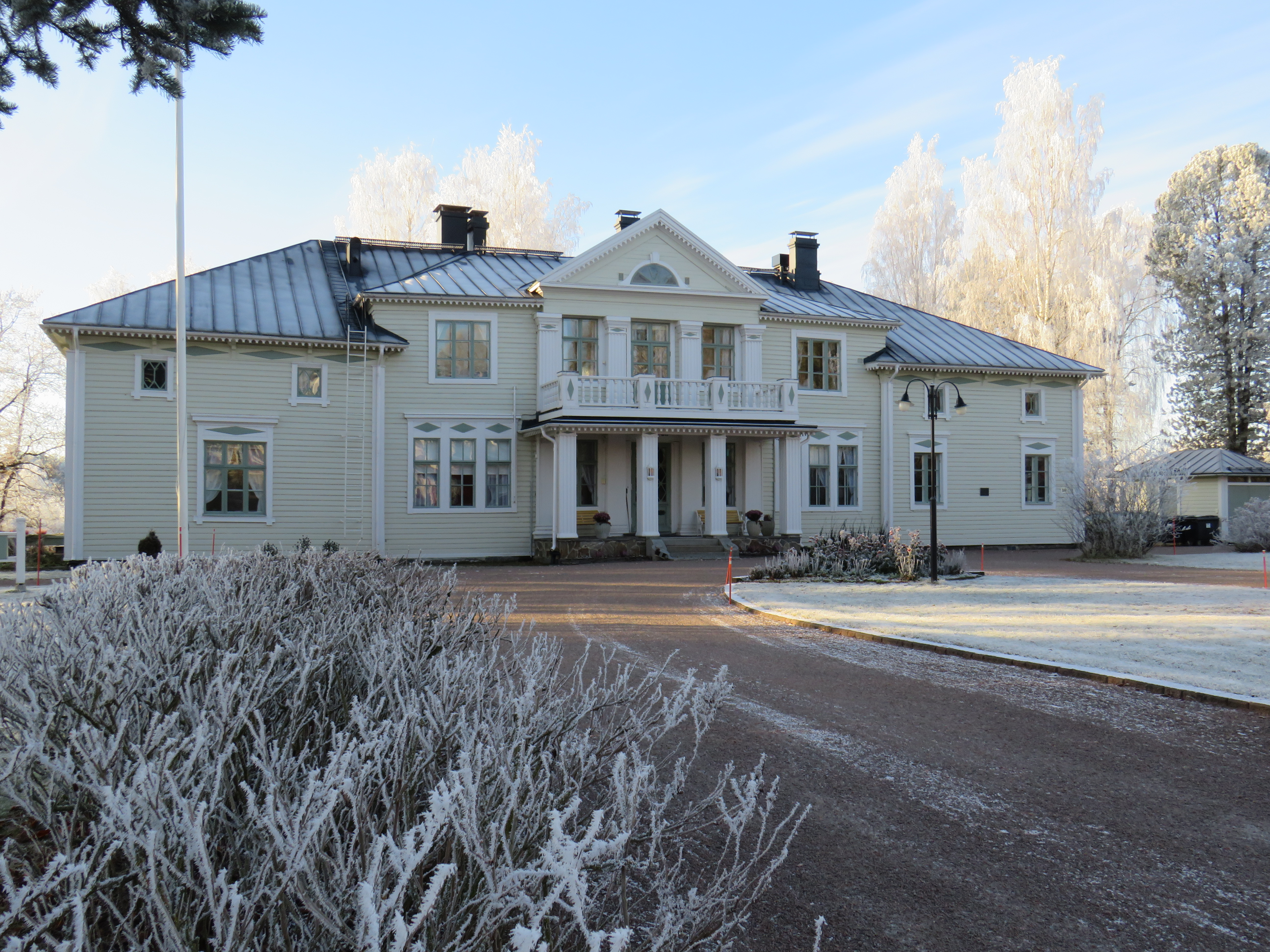
Keppo Mansion in winter.

In 1937, Emil Höglund began a fur farming and became the financier and principal owner of a mink farm established in Petsmo. In 1943, Karl Johan Tidström joined as the second owner, and by 1953, the farm had become the largest in Finland.

In 1954, Höglund and Tidström bought the Keppo mansion and founded Keppo Ltd (Oy Keppo Ab in Finnish). The world's largest mink farm was built on the estate's land. Fur production peaked in the 1970s, when approximately 130,000 fox skins and 480,000 mink skins were produced annually at the farms owned by Keppo.

In 1963, Oy Keppo Ab acquired the abrasives company Mirka, which had relocated from Helsinki to Jeppo. In 1966, it purchased land belonging to Oravaisten Verkatehdas Oy clothing factory and acquired a refrigerated ship MS Keppo to transport mink feed.

=== KWH Group 1984–present ===
KWH Group was formed in 1984, when Oy Keppo Ab acquired the shares of Oy Wiik & Höglund Ab from the Wiik family.

During the late 1980s and early 1990s, the conglomerate was restructured, and several divestments were made, including all mink and fox farming activities. In 1984, KWH Group became a co-owner of a water trap manufacturer Prevex, which became a fully owned subsidiary in 2003. In 1987, KWH Group acquired full ownership of the frozen storage company Etelän Jää – Söder Is and renamed it KWH Freeze.

In the 1980s the Group concentrated its resources on KWH Pipe, KWH Plast and KWH Mirka. Other activities were consolidated within KWH Invest.Initially, KWH Pipe received most of the investments and established factories around the world. KWH Pipe is part of Uponor Infra since 2013.

In September 2012, Uponor Oyj and KWH Group Oy announced plans to merge their infrastructure businesses. The joint venture Uponor Infra Oy was created, with Uponor owning 55.3 percent and KWH Group 44.7 percent. In spring 2013, the Finnish Competition Authority blocked the merger between KWH Pipe and Uponor, but the Market Court approved the formation of the joint venture in May. Uponor Infra Oy began operations in July 2013. The cooperation continued for 10 years until KWH Group sold its shareholding to Uponor in 2023.

Mirka Ltd (renamed from KWH Mirka in 2016) is a Finnish manufacturer specializing in abrasives, surface finishing solutions, polishing compounds, and sanding equipment. In the early 2000s, Mirka developed dust-free sanding technology and has since become one of the technology leaders in the abrasives industry. In volume terms, Mirka is among the largest companies globally in the coated and non-woven abrasives sectors.

Mirka has expanded its international presence through organic growth and acquisitions, including the Italian company Cafro in 2017, strengthening its precision grinding offering. In 2025, Mirka opened a manufacturing facility in the United States, further supporting its global production footprint. As of 2025, the company had subsidiaries in 20 countries across several countries in Europe, Asia, North and South America.

Rauanheimo, part of KWH Logistics, has also expanded internationally, entering the Swedish market in 2025.

== Organisation ==
The KWH Group consists of four independent divisions

- Mirka Ltd, a manufacturer of abrasive products
- KWH Logistics, comprising KWH Logistics Group and its subsidiaries, e.g. Oy M. Rauanheimo Ab, Stevena Oy and Oy Galea Shipping Ab
- Oy KWH Freeze Ab, a provider of frozen food storage services
- KWH Invest, which manages strategic shareholdings and industrial real estate, and includes Oy Prevex Ab, a manufacturer of water traps.

== Recognitions ==
- In 1985, Mirka received the President's Export Award
- In 2016, KWH Group was named Family Business of the Year by the Finnish Federation of Family Businesses
