= Philip Ulric Strengberg =

- Born: 2 August 1805; Sievi, Finland
- Died: 8 October 1872 (aged 67); Jakobstad, Finland
- Occupation: Industrialist
- Spouse: Ulrica Charlotta Thelin (1799-1878) (m. 1829)

Philip Ulric Strengberg (2 August 1805 – 8 October 1872) was a businessman in Jakobstad and the majority owner of the Ph. U. Strengberg tobaccy factory, which he co-owned together with Victor Schauman, and later Wilhelm Schauman.

== Life ==
Strengberg was born in Sievi, Finland, and entered an Apologist school in Uleåborg (Oulu) at the age 13, graduating in 1820. He then worked as a sales clerk for the widow of local merchant Kilian Malm in Jakobstad and was granted the privileges of merchant on 5 May 1828. He soon became one of the leading merchants in Jakobstad. He was involved in mainly export trade, shipping and the management of a local saw mill.

He married Ulrica Charlotta Thelin on 7 June 1829, but the marriage was childless. Ulrica was born in Jakobstad on 18 February 1799 to the local merchant Johan Thelin and his wife Anna Margareta Häggström.

During the years 1842 until 1848 Strengberg purchased the majority of shares in the tobacco factory in Jakobstad (founded in 1762). This proved to be the boost that the stagnant tobaccy industry had been waiting for, and the business was soon booming under the new name of "Ph. U. Strengberg & C:o Tobaks-Fabrik". He was a member of the municipal court from 1837 until 1858, and from 1843 an alderman of the city council. He died in Jakobstad in 1872, leaving behind a fortune of 526 000 Finnish Marks.

== Tobacco factory ==
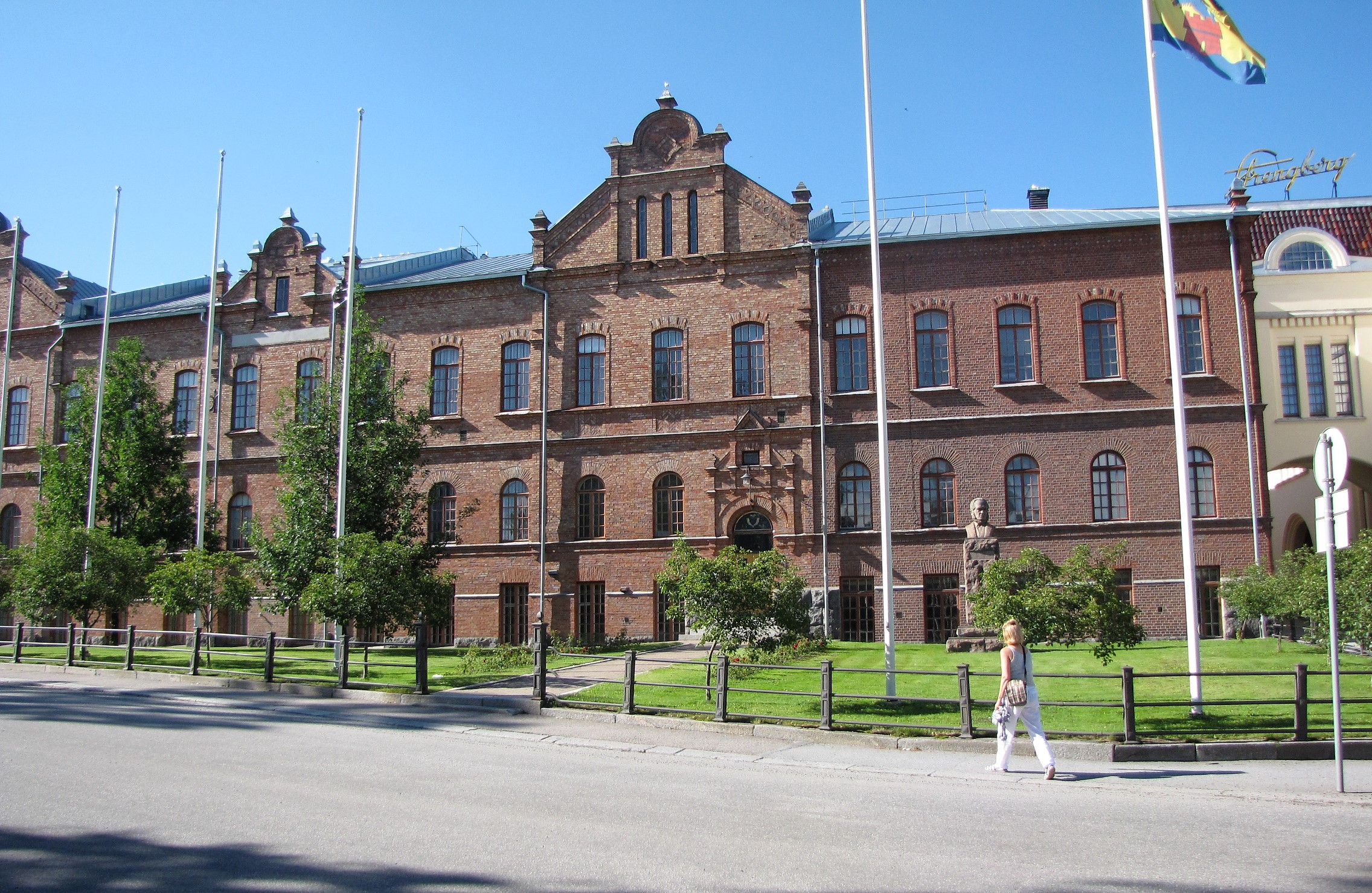
Strengberg tobacco factory.

The Strengberg tobacco factory was one of the largest and most successful tobacco firms in Finland, situated in the Ostrobothnian town Jakobstad. From this position of strength, it was also (probably) the first Finnish company to open a subsidiary abroad, in the Swedish town of Härnösand in 1903. The severe competition between the Finnish tobacco producers (such as P.C. Rettig & Co and Tollander & Klaerich) led to rapid technological development in the branch. By the 1840s, Strengberg had started to install machinery and industrialise artisan production. Cutting machines were acquired and installed in the 1850s, and the first steam engine to drive the cutting and pressing machines were acquired in 1863, and in 1900, the factory employed around 1000 people in Jakobstad.

The production in Härnösand, Sweden had started on a small scale in 1903, but expanded rapidly and Ph. U. Strengberg & C:o became a significant producer of cigarettes in Sweden. Even during the first full year of operations in 1904, Strengberg produced 17 per cent of all Swedish cigarettes. In 1908 Strengberg was the second largest cigarette producer in Sweden. Its share of cigarette production reached a top figure in 1911 when Strengberg accounted for nearly half of the cigarettes produced in Sweden. The success of the Strengberg firm can, first and foremost, be attributed to the use of modern production methods in cigarette production.

The Finnish tobacco producers’ Swedish operations came to an end with the foundation of the Swedish tobacco monopoly AB Svenska Tobaksmonopolet in 1914. For Strengberg this was a harsh blow, as production in Härnösand had been quite profitable. Strengberg opened a subsidiary in Oslo, Norway in 1912. However, this operation never met with financial success, and the subsidiary was closed down in 1928. The subsidiaries in Copenhagen, Denmark and Lübeck, Germany, met with similar fates.

In 1940, P.C. Rettig & Co bought the share majority of Ph. U. Strengberg & Co Ab in Jakobstad, operating tobacco factories both in Turku and Jakobstad. The companies were fully merged to form Oy Rettig-Strengberg Ab in 1976. In the mid-1990s, the factory was bought by R. J. Reynolds, who later sold it to Swedish Match. The factory was closed down in 1998, and the production was moved to the Swedish Match factories in Belgium.
