= Jacobstads Wapen =

Replica ship

The Jacobstads Wapen is a modern replica of an 18th-century galeas built in Jakobstad, Finland, between 1988 and 1994. She is built according to blueprints by the Swedish warship architect Fredrik Henrik af Chapman dating from 1755, the oldest vessel blueprints found in Finland. She is classified by the Finnish National Board of Navigation as a passenger, special-purpose vessel. The 18th century galleon Jacobstads Wapen was sold off in Amsterdam.

She has been used as a symbol for Jakobstad but as of late has encountered financial problems. She participated in the festivities at the 300 year anniversary of St. Petersburg, Russia, in 2003. In 2005 it was discovered that some of the woodwork had deteriorated. As of 2021 repairs to teh hull were finished and she awaited renewal of the engine and navigational equipment, to again sail the sea.

== Specifications ==
- Length: 82 ft (25 meters)
- Length (overall): 131 ft (40 meters)
- Bowsprit: 49 ft (15 meters)
- Width: 25 ft (7.6 meters)
- Draught: 8 ft (2.5 meters)
- Sails: eight, total sail area 5 813sq/ft (540 square meters)
- Main mast height: 105 ft (32 meters) above the waterline
- Engines: 700 hp Volvo Penta
- Ballast: 34.4 long tons (35 metric tons)
- Speed: between 0 and 10 knots (often around 7 knots) under sail.

== See also ==
- Jakobstad
- Sailing ships
- Ship replica
