= Jakobstad =

Jakobstad Pietarsaari
- Town
- City of Jakobstad; Staden Jakobstad; Pietarsaaren kaupunki
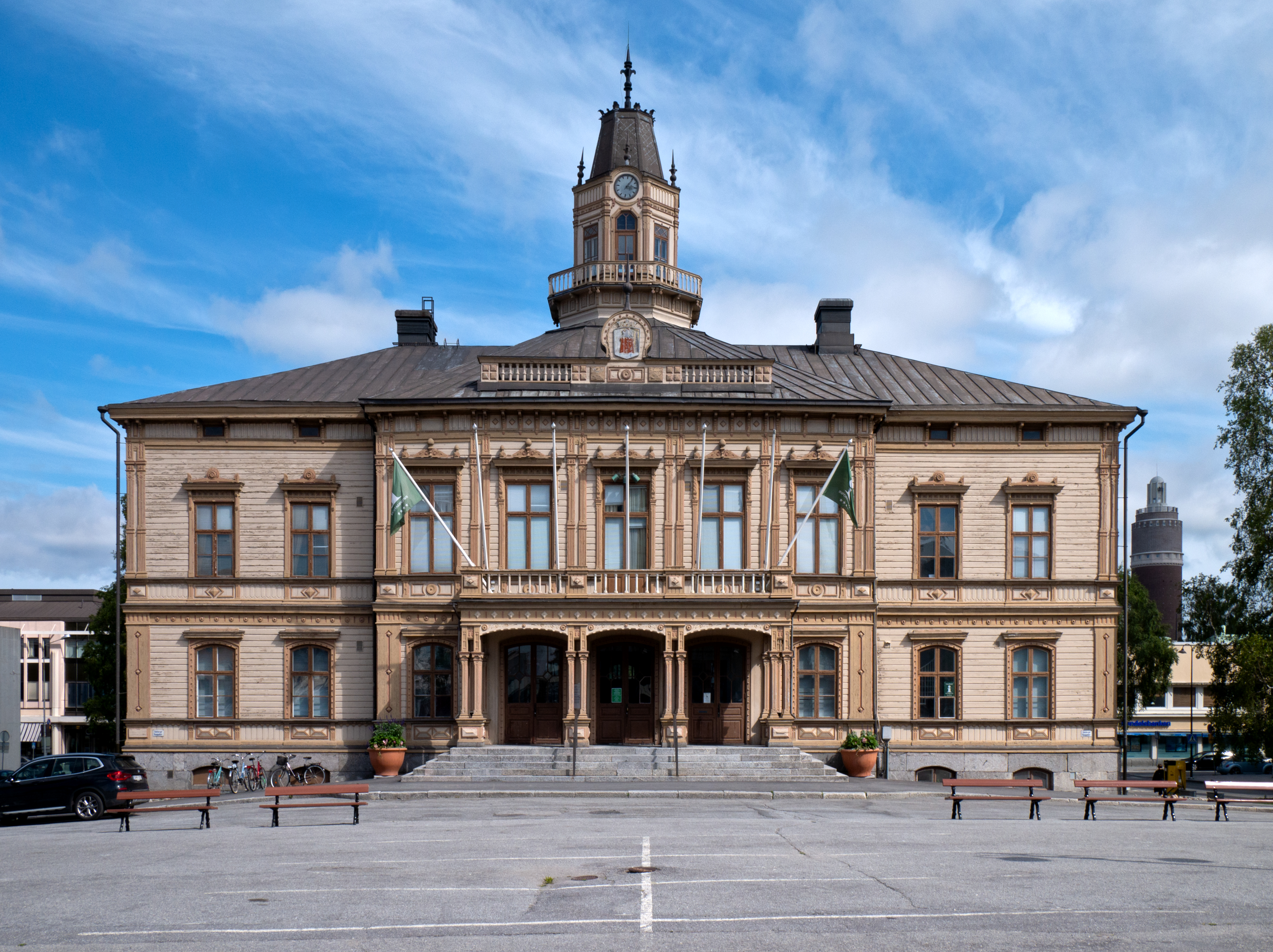
- Jakobstad Town Hall

- Flag Coat of arms

- Location of Jakobstad in Finland
- Interactive map of Jakobstad
- Coordinates: 63°40′N 022°42′E
- Country: Finland
- Region: Ostrobothnia
- Sub-region: Jakobstad
- Charter: 1652
- Named for: Jacob De la Gardie

Government
  - City manager: Robert Nyman

Area (2018-01-01)
  - Total: 396.35 km^{2} (153.03 sq mi)
  - Land: 88.52 km^{2} (34.18 sq mi)
  - Water: 307.94 km^{2} (118.90 sq mi)
  - Rank: 302nd largest in Finland

Population (2025-12-31)
  - Total: 19,657
  - Rank: 57th largest in Finland
  - Density: 222.06/km^{2} (575.1/sq mi)

Population by native language
  - Swedish: 53.1% (official)
  - Finnish: 29.7% (official)
  - Others: 17.2%

Population by age
  - 0 to 14: 15.5%
  - 15 to 64: 58.2%
  - 65 or older: 26.3%
- Time zone: UTC+02:00 (EET)
  - Summer (DST): UTC+03:00 (EEST)
- Website: en.jakobstad.fi

Jakobstad (Finland Swedish: [ˈjɑːkopˌstɑːd]; Finnish: Pietarsaari, Finnish: [ˈpie̯tɑrˌsɑːri]) is a town in Finland, located on the west coast of the country. Jakobstad is situated in Ostrobothnia, along the Gulf of Bothnia. The population of Jakobstad is approximately 20,000, while the sub-region has a population of approximately 51,000. It is the 57th most populous municipality in Finland.

Jakobstad covers a land area of 88.52 km^{2} (34.18 sq mi). The population density is 222.06/km^{2} (575.1/sq mi). Neighboring municipalities are Larsmo, Pedersöre, and Nykarleby. The city of Vaasa is located 98 km (61 mi) southwest of Jakobstad.

Jakobstad is a bilingual municipality with Finnish and Swedish as its official languages. The population consists of 30% Finnish speakers, 53% Swedish speakers, and 17% speakers of other languages.

== Origin of the names ==
The Swedish name literally means Jacob's City or Jacob's Town, in reference to Jacob De la Gardie. Colloquially, the town is known as Jeppis.

It was founded at the old harbour of the parish Pedersöre and this name lives on in its Finnish name, Pietarsaari, literally Peter's Island.

== History ==
The town was founded in 1652 by Ebba Brahe, the widow of the military commander Jacob De la Gardie, and was granted city privileges by Queen Christina of Sweden. The town was founded at the old harbour of the parish Pedersöre. Pedersöre remains an independent municipality neighbouring Jakobstad.

The town grew slowly at first, with the authorities scarcely promoting any growth. In 1680 the inhabitants were ordered to relocate to the cities of Kokkola, Oulu and Nykarleby, but the order was rescinded. Wars also contributed to the slow growth, and the city was invaded by Russian troops twice during the Greater Wrath, and large parts of the town were burnt to the ground. A majority of the inhabitants fled the city. While those with means moved across the sea to the Swedish side, others took shelter in the forest or in the archipelago. Many were captured or killed. During the 1720s, some of the previous inhabitants returned, while newcomers also added to the population. The subsequent decades were finally marked by a period of growth, and the current church was built in 1731.

The economic foundation was laid in the mid 18th century, with tar manufacturing and tobacco packaging at its centre. Trade started to develop rapidly in Jakobstad as of 1765, when the cities along the Finnish shore of the Gulf of Bothnia were granted privileges by the Swedish crown to trade directly with foreign countries. This also led to shipbuilding becoming a major activity in Jakobstad. The first ships to sail with goods to foreign countries were the galeas Jacobstads Wapen and the brig Enigheten. Trade and shipbuilding made Jakobstad a wealthy city, and a notable businessman of that time was the merchant and shipbuilder Adolf Lindskog, who also became one of the richest men in Finland.

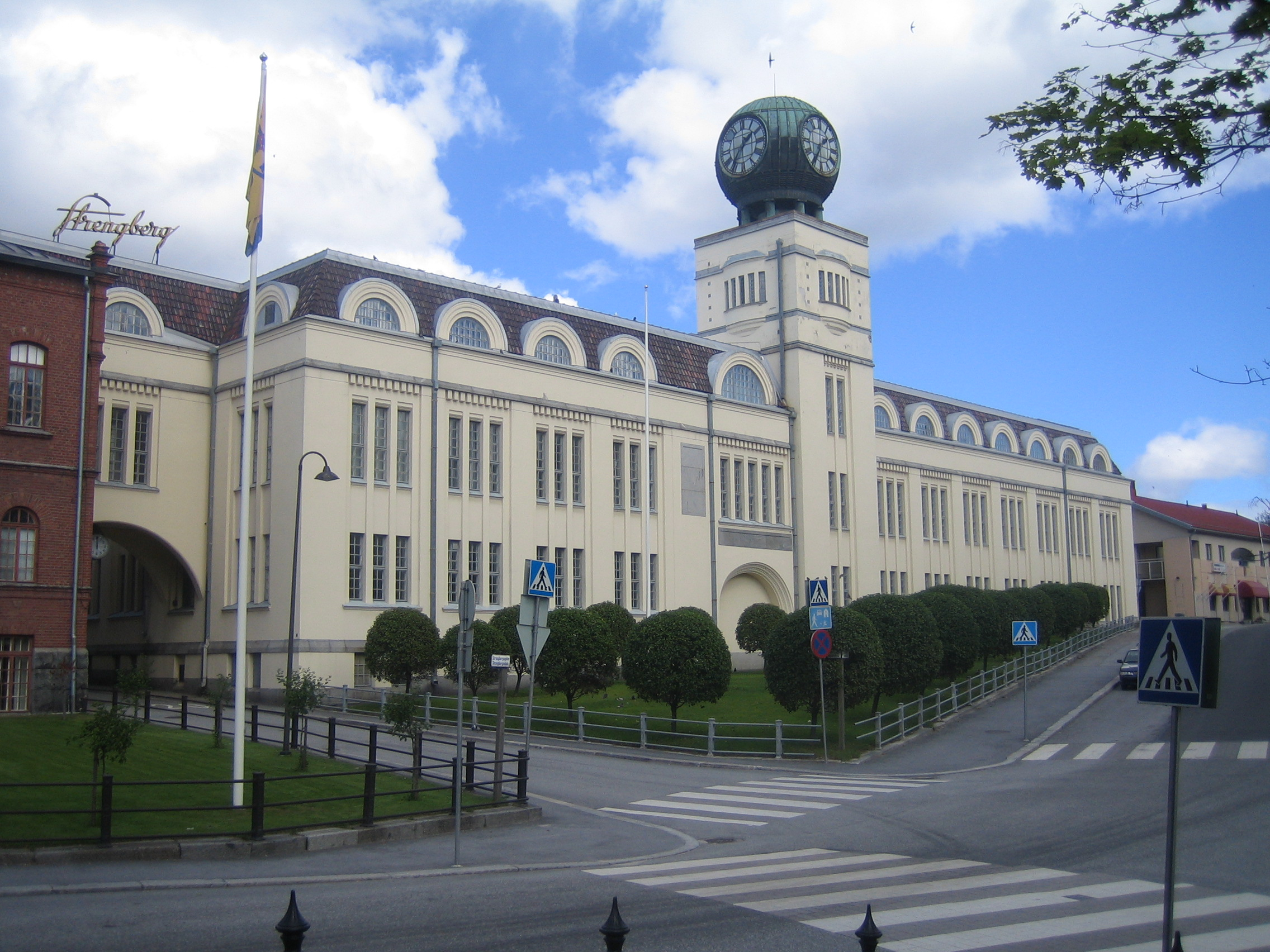
The "Strengberg" tobacco factory

The early 19th century was a time of upheaval, which saw the 1808–1809 war between Sweden and Russia, as well as a devastating fire in 1835 that destroyed approximately half of the city. Despite this, the economic progress continued, and a brewery, a matchstick factory and several banks were founded after 1850. In 1859, the merchant and shipowner Peter Malm started a steam powered sawmill, which was only the second such installation in Finland. The Crimean War was a major setback to shipping industry, as the British navy puts up an effective blockade and the shipping fleet in Jakobstad during the Åland War was reduced from 26 ships to 9.

Notable businessmen in the 19th century were Otto Malm and Wilhelm Schauman, the latter founding a chicory (coffee substitute) factory in Jakobstad in 1883. This moment in time is usually considered as the start of industrialization in Jakobstad. In 1900, the Strengberg tobacco factory was the largest employer in Jakobstad.

An artillery school was located in Jakobstad during the Finnish Civil War. During World War II, the city was bombed once by Soviet bomber planes, causing a few casualties. Up until the 1960s, the town was pretty small and mainly Swedish speaking with a pretty small finnish speaking minority, but because of the industrial expansion in the 1960s and 1970s, the need for additional work force caused a large influx of Finnish speakers and the city became almost majority Finnish speaking.

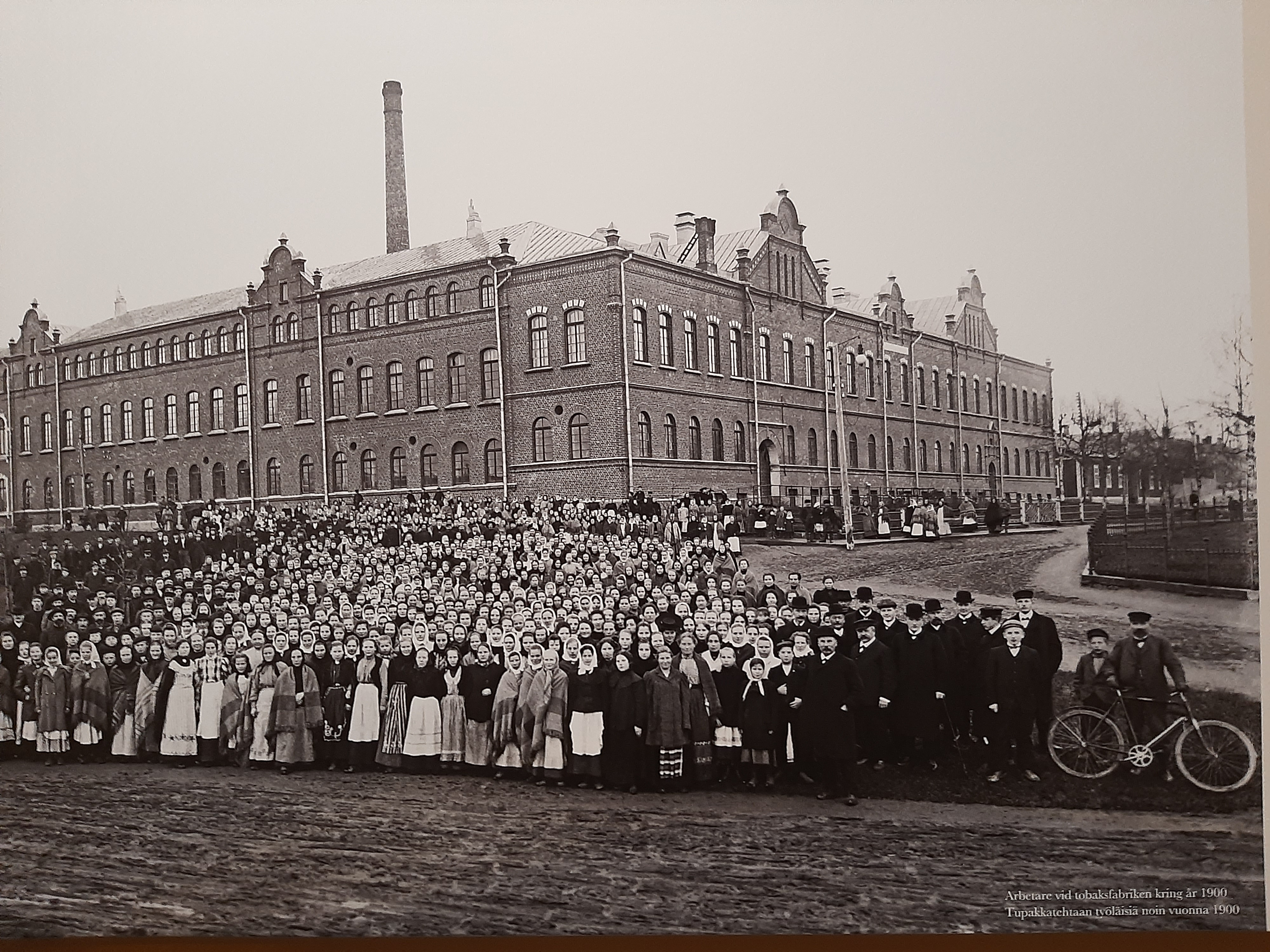
The Strengberg tobacco factory in 1900

=== Early industries ===
During the second half of the 19th century, the city changed from a city of shipping to an industrial city. From 1850 to 1900, the population increased from about 1,500 to over 6,000 inhabitants. The existing factories developed rapidly and new factories were established. Production in the factories was still small-scale. The city produced everything from beer and spirits to soaps and matches. The Finnish-speaking population in the city increased sharply when the tobacco factory expanded and was in great need of labor.

== Demographics ==
=== Population ===
The city of Jakobstad has 19,657 inhabitants, making it the 57th most populous municipality in Finland. The sub-region has a population of 50,560

Population size 1990–2025
Year	Population
1990	19,883
1995	19,939
2000	19,636
2005	19,521
2010	19,656
2015	19,436
2020	19,066
2025	19,657

=== Languages ===
Population by
mother tongue (2025)
1. Swedish (53.1%)
2. Finnish (29.7%)
3. Ukrainian (2.90%)
4. Arabic (1.50%)
5. Vietnamese (1.30%)
6. English (1.20%)
7. Bengali (1.10%)
8. Other (9.20%)

The city of Jakobstad is officially bilingual, with both Swedish and Finnish as official languages. The majority of the population, 10,434 persons (53.1%), spoke Swedish as their first language. The number of Finnish speakers was 5,844 persons (30%) of the population. Foreign languages were spoken by 17.2% of the population. As English and Swedish are compulsory school subjects, functional bilingualism or trilingualism acquired through language studies is not uncommon.

More than 20 different languages are spoken as mother tongues in Jakobstad. The most commonly spoken foreign languages are Ukrainian (2.9%), Arabic (1.5%), Vietnamese (1.3%) and English (1.2%).

== Politics ==
Results of the 2017 Finnish municipal election in Jakobstad:

Party	Seats
Swedish People's Party	19
Social Democratic Party	10
Left Alliance	5
Christian Democrats	4
Pro Pietarsaari-Jakobstad	3
Green League	1
Centre Party	1

== Events ==
At the end of July, Jakobsdagar, in Finnish: Jaakon päivät, takes place. The event lasts for an entire week and includes various festivities such as concerts, merchant stalls, competitions, and performances. It attracts a large number of people each year.

The name of the event translates to "Jacob's days" and refers to the name of the city.

At the end of November a chamber music festival called Rusk is held annually in Jakobstad. At the heart of this festival embracing superb chamber music and various other genres of the arts is the Schauman Hall in the centre of town, but the events also spread out into the surrounding urban environment.

== Culture and sights ==
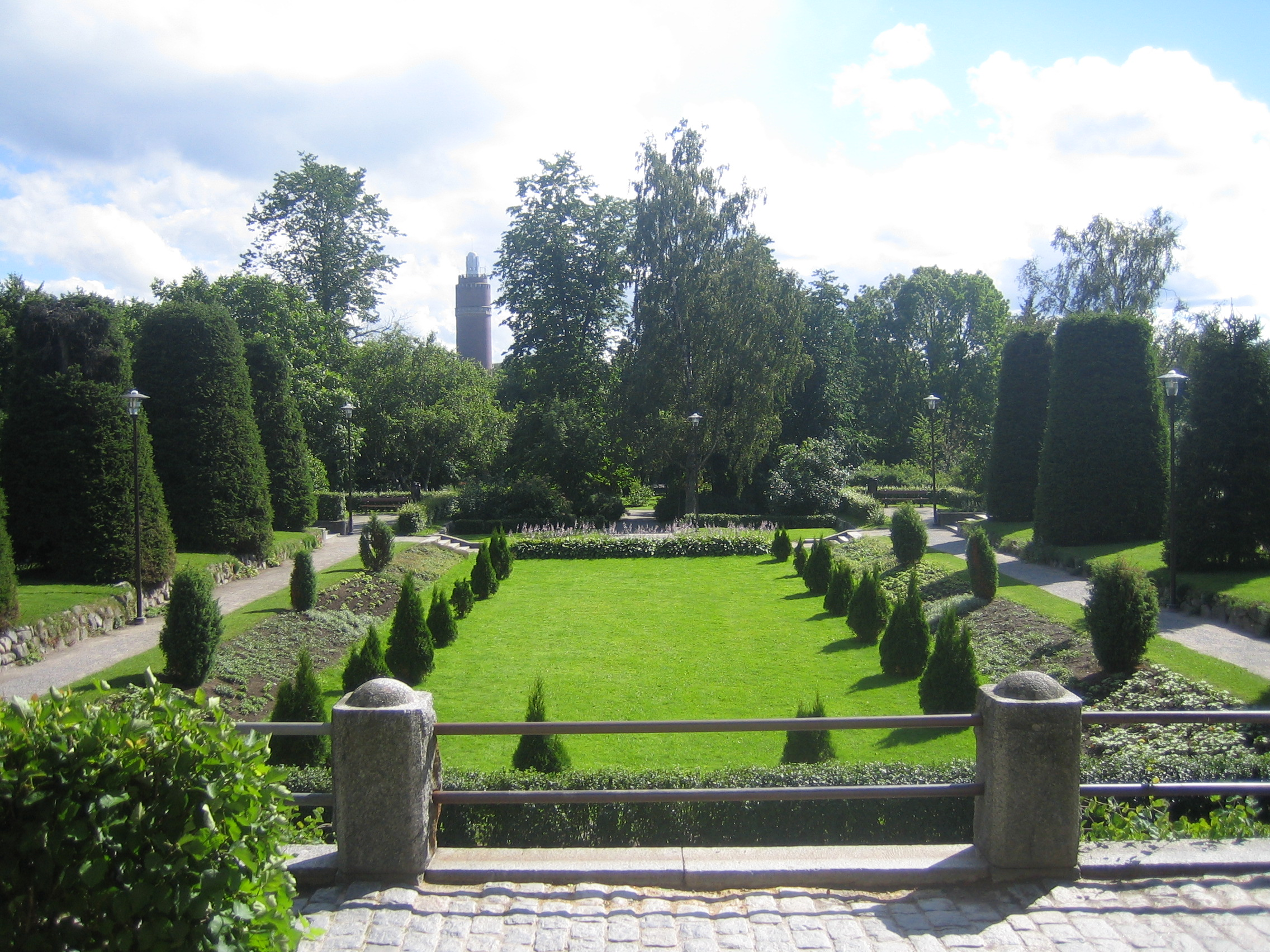
The Skolparken botanical garden

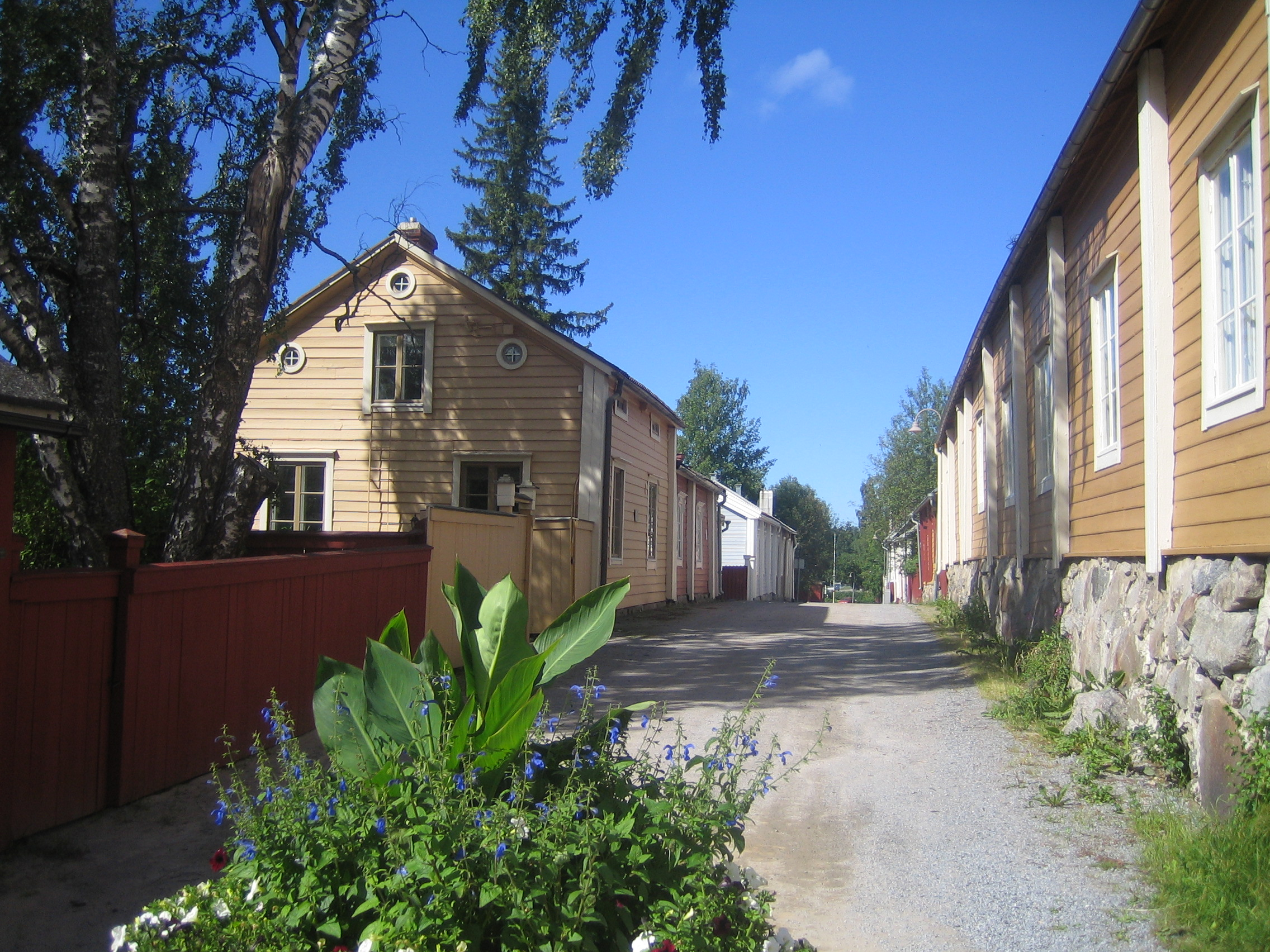
The old town Skata

- Jakobstad City Hall (in Swedish: Jakobstads rådhus, in Finnish: Pietarsaaren raatihuone) is a historic building in the city, which was completed in 1875. The current look of the building dates from 1890.
- Jakobstad is the home of the galeas Jacobstads Wapen, a full-scale replica built between 1987 and 1992, based on the original 1755 drawings by Swedish naval architect Fredrik Henrik af Chapman
- Jakobstad - Pietarsaari Museum is the main museum in the city, concentrating on maritime and ship building history
- The Arctic museum Nanoq is located just outside Jakobstad.
- Cikoriamuseet was the only museum focused on chicory in Finland. In the former chicory factory from the 19th century, visitors can familiarize themselves with the production of chicory, get acquainted with Wilhelm Schauman's early industrial career and also experience authentic old factory conditions. The museum in Jakobstad will also offer art exhibitions and other events.
- The botanical garden Skolparken (in Swedish: "the school park", in Finnish: "koulupuisto"), with approximately 1,000 plant species, is renowned both as one of the most northerly botanical gardens in the world and for its classical park architecture. The foundation was laid in 1915 and the park was completed in 1932. The funding was provided by the Schauman family, who wanted to honour the memory of Elise and Viktor Schauman. The park was designed by the prominent Finnish garden architect Bengt Schalin.
- Skata is a protected residential area close to the city centre which dates from 1783. Up until the late 19th century, Skata was home primarily to sailors and their families. As of the 1890s, it transformed into a mainly working class area, providing housing to a large part of the work force employed by the Strengberg tobacco factory.
- Pedersöre Church

=== Food ===
In the 1980s, a rural liverwurst was named traditional food of Jakobstad. The culture of cafés and restaurants is lively in Jakobstad anyway, as the Strengberg tobacco factory was the first Finnish industrial plant to offer lunch to its employees. Jakobstad has ethnic restaurants, home-cooked lunch restaurants, à la carte restaurants and cafés, pubs and nightclubs.

== Sports ==
The town's football team FF Jaro currently plays in Veikkausliiga, the top league in Finland. They are also home to Kakkonen side Jakobstads BK. The woman's league football club FC United has been very successful over the years.

== Twin towns – sister cities ==
Jakobstad is twinned with:

- Asker, Norway
- Bünde, Germany
- Eslöv, Sweden
- Garðabær, Iceland
- Jamestown, United States
- Jūrmala, Latvia
- Rudersdal, Denmark

== Notable people ==
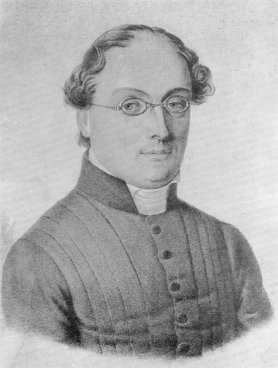
J. L. Runeberg

- Alexei Eremenko Jr., footballer
- Roman Eremenko, footballer
- Sara Forsberg, singer, actress, and comedian
- Lars Huldén, writer, scholar and translator
- Bertel Jung, architect and urban planner
- Mathias "Vreth" Lillmåns, singer of Finnish metal band Finntroll
- Adam Markhiyev, footballer
- Karl and his son Walter Nars, industrialists
- Fredrik Norrena, ice-hockey player (goalkeeper)
- Anthony Olusanya, footballer
- Jens Portin, footballer
- Jonas Portin, footballer
- Fredrika Runeberg, writer
- Johan Ludvig Runeberg, national poet and author of the national anthem of Finland
- Tomas Sandström, ice-hockey player
- Axel Schauman, businessman
- Ossian Schauman, founder of the Swedish-speaking non-governmental organization Folkhälsan
- Victor Schauman, pharmacist and businessman
- Wilhelm Schauman, industrialist
- Magnus Schjerfbeck, architect
- Simon Skrabb, footballer
- Philip Ulric Strengberg, prominent businessman and majority owner of the local tobacco factory in the 19th century
- Heidi Sundblad-Halme, composer and founder of the Helsinki Women's Orchestra
- Adam Vidjeskog, footballer
- Axel Vidjeskog, footballer
- Isak Vidjeskog, footballer
- Niklas Vidjeskog, football coach and a former player

== See also ==
- Kristinestad
