= Ossian Schauman =

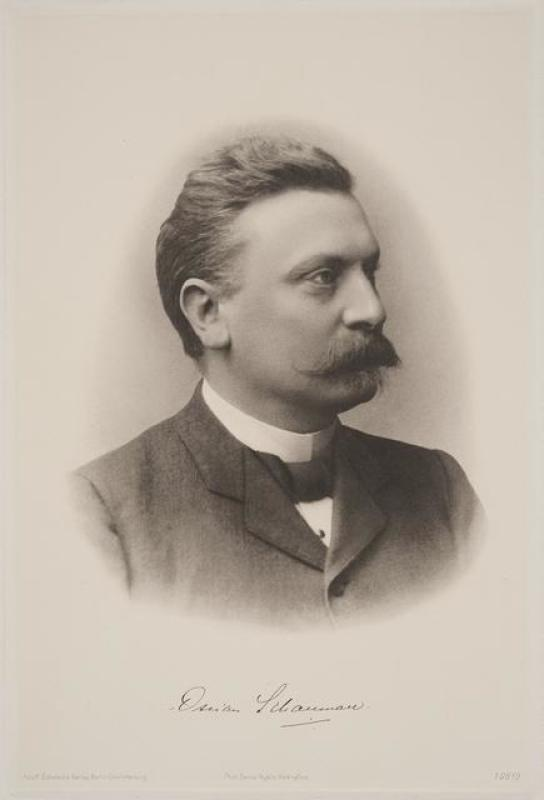
- Born: 30 March 1862; Jakobstad, Finland
- Died: 6 February 1922 (aged 59); Helsinki, Finland
- Occupation: scientist
- Spouse: Betsy Lerche (24 March 1869 – 2 November 1941)

Julius Ossian Schauman (30 March 1862 – 6 February 1922) was one of the founders of the Swedish-speaking non-governmental organization Folkhälsan, which provides social welfare and health care services in Finland. He was also the younger brother of Wilhelm Schauman.

== Life ==
Ossian Schauman was born on 30 March 1862 in Jakobstad to the pharmacist and businessman Victor Schauman and his wife Elise Wilhelmina Schauman (née Ekelund), who had 13 children in total. The father died of heart failure before the age of 50, when Ossian Schauman was only 10 years old. There seems to have been a genetic heart defect running in the family, since both Ossian Schauman and several of his brothers also died before they had turned 60 years old.

He displayed an interest in botany already at an early age, and could often be found tending to plants in the garden. In 1872, Ossian Schauman was admitted to the Wasa Lyceum (high school) at the age of 10. This was also the year in which his father died, which devastated Ossian and the rest of the family. After graduating from high school in 1879 at the age of 17, Schauman moved to Helsinki to continue his studies at the university. In 1888, he graduated with a first medical degree, and in 1894 he became an M.D. in internal medicine. In 1897 he became an assistant professor in medicin and then finally in 1908, a professor in internal medicine at the University of Helsinki, a position he held until his death.

== Folkhälsan ==
Schauman was one of the founders of the non-governmental organization Folkhälsan, as well as its first chairman. In his will, he donated a sum of money for the purpose of creating and maintaining a Swedish speaking institute for genetic research. Folkhälsan's objective was to reduce infant mortality and to lower the incidence of tuberculosis in Finland. Today, Folkhälsan provides social welfare and health care services, and employs approximately 200 researchers, studying among others, genetically transmitted diseases and diseases caused by lifestyle. Folkhälsan funds its operations by selling services to cities and communes, including child and geriatric care. Additionally, Folkhälsan receives funding from the state owned chance games revenues, and donations.

== Sources ==
- Ellonen, Leena (ed.): Suomen professorit 1640–2007, pp. 910–911. Helsinki: Professoriliitto, 2008. ISBN 978-952-99281-1-8. (in Finnish)
