= Jakobstad - Pietarsaari Museum =

Museum in Jakobstad, Finland

Coordinates: 63°40′18″N 22°42′12″E

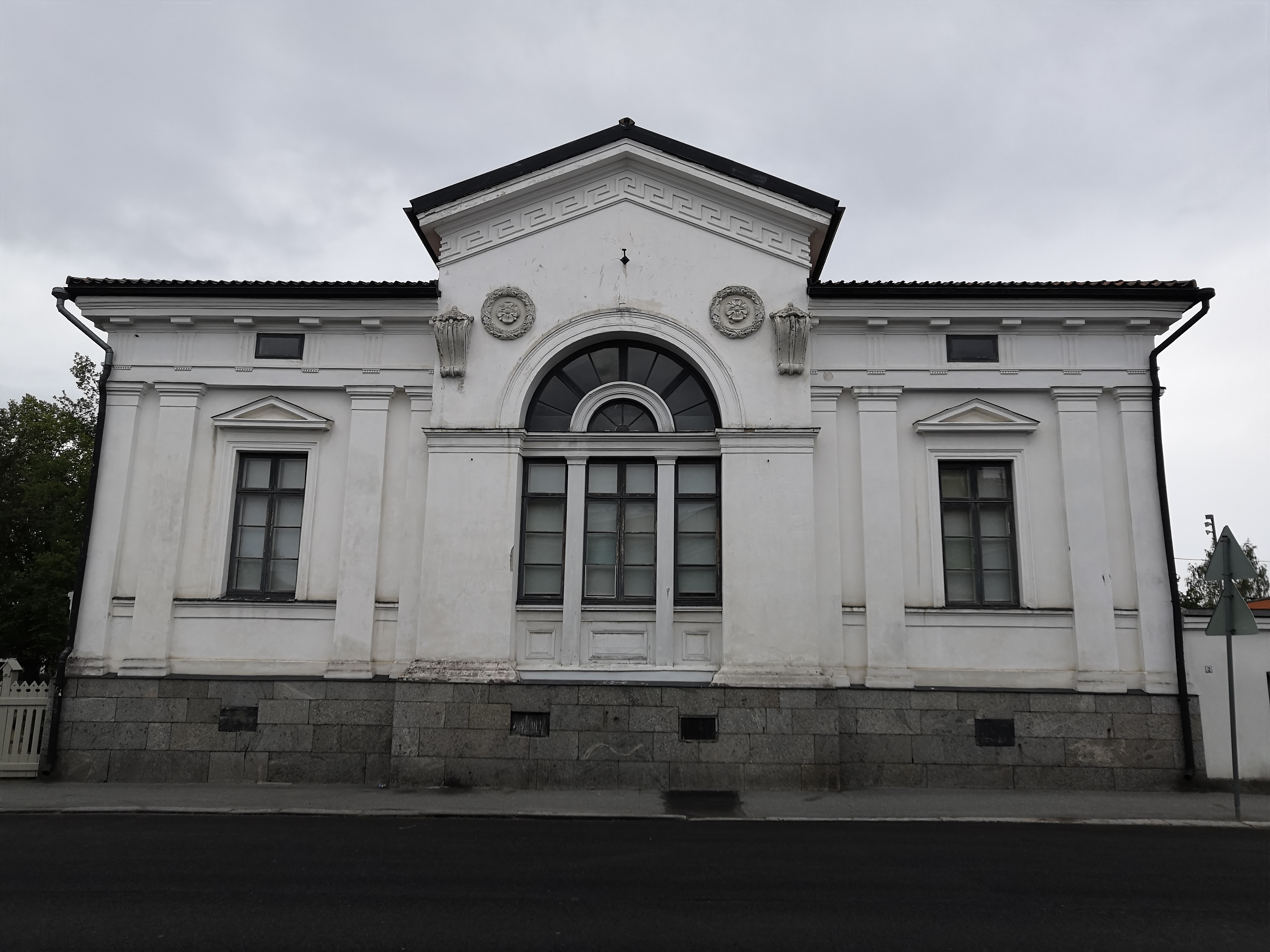
Jakobstad Museum

The Jakobstad - Pietarsaari Museum (Swedish: Jakobstads museum, Finnish: Pietarsaaren museo) is a city museum located at Storgatan 2, Jakobstad, Finland. It was founded in 1904, but served as a private museum until 1906. The museum is a historic museum, which focuses on maritime and shipbuilding. The main building of the museum is called Malmska gården.

The Malm House is the main facility at the Jakobstad-Pietarsaari museum. The museum also includes Strengberg Tobacco museum, Runeberg’s cottage, Mother Westman’s cottage, and an exhibition hall Tempus that opened in 2023.
