= Jakobstad City Hall =

Building in Finland

Coordinates: 63°40′27.5″N 22°42′18″E

- Jakobstads rådhus Pietarsaaren raatihuone
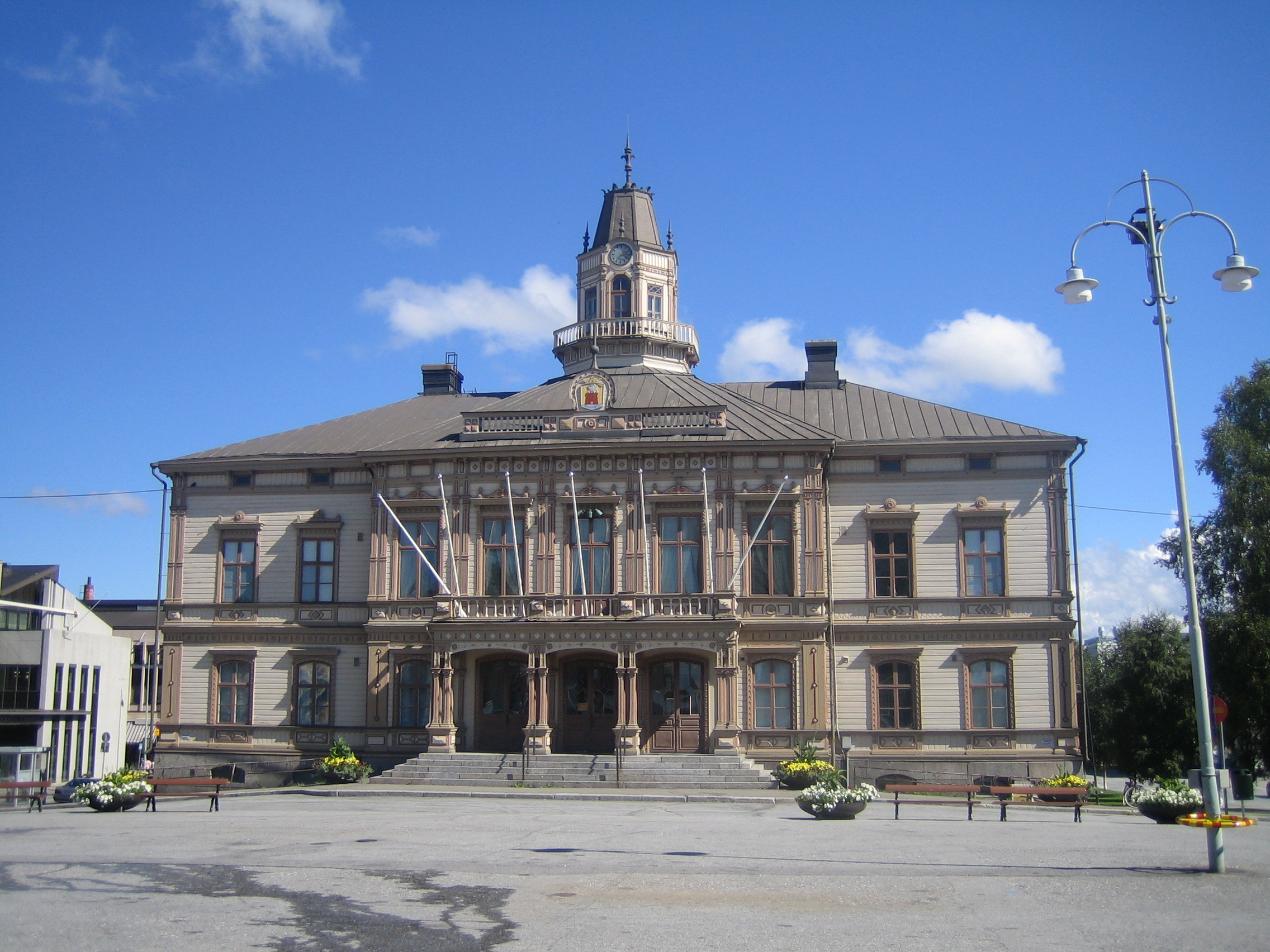

General information
- Completed: 1875

Jakobstad City Hall (Swedish: Jakobstads rådhus, Finnish: Pietarsaaren raatihuone) is a historic building in the city of Jakobstad, Finland. It was completed in 1875. The current look of the building dates from 1890.

== History ==
A two-storey wooden town hall was built in 1878 by Georg Wilenius. A neo-Renaissance facade was added during renovations in 1890.

Hairline cracks were observed in the basement in 2004. In 2009, the building was closed due to rotting logs beneath the stone foundation, and repair was estimated to cost 2-3 million euros. The building was described as sinking into the ground in 2013, but no funds for renovation were allocated in the city's 2014 budget. A stone wall under the hall was reinforced with concrete in 2015.
