= Viktor Schauman =

Finnish pharmacist, businessman, politician (1822–1872)

- Born: c. 1822; Jakobstad, Grand Duchy of Finland, Russian Empire
- Died: 3 February 1872 (aged 49–50); Nikolaistad, Grand Duchy of Finland, Russian Empire (present-day Vaasa, Finland)
- Occupations: Pharmacist; businessman; politician
- Spouse: Elise Wilhelmina (née Ekelund)
- Children: Wilhelm Schauman, Ossian Schauman

Viktor Schauman (c. 1822 – 3 February 1872) was a pharmacist, notable business person, and politician from Jakobstad, as well as a member of the noble Schauman family. He was married to Elise Wilhelmina Schauman, and they had 13 children, many of whom achieved great success, including industrialist Wilhelm Schauman, Folkhälsan founder Ossian Schauman, and businessman Axel Schauman.

Schauman’s parents were Berndt Schauman (1786–1862), the town bailiff of Naantali and Uusikaupunki, and Anna Lovisa Wilhelms (1795–1866). He started working at a pharmacy in 1834, became a qualified pharmacist in 1843, and completed his apothecary examination in 1845. From 1845 onward, he worked as an apothecary in Jakobstad.

In 1845, Schauman, together with Jakobstad merchant and shipowner Philip Ulric Strengberg, acquired the tobacco factory established in Jakobstad in 1762 (Jakobstads Tobaksspinneri). The factory was renamed Ph. U. Strengberg & Co Tobaks-Fabrik, and Schauman and Strengberg expanded and mechanized its production. Schauman also had an interest in gardening, and in his and his wife’s memory, a botanical garden known as Skolparken was established in Jakobstad.

== Sources ==
- Österbotten No. 4 (page 8) Link
