= Karl Nars =

- Born: 13 August 1874; Purmo, Finland
- Died: 21 January 1952 (aged 77); Purmo, Finland
- Occupation: industrialist

Karl Nars (13 August 1874 – 21 January 1952) was a well-known industrialist in Jakobstad in the first half of the 20th century.

As of 1934, Nars was the owner of the steampowered sawmill in Jakobstad (Swedish: Jakobstad ångsåg). Karl Nars and his sons founded and developed the Nars Industries (Swedish: Narska företagen) into a significant industrial group, mainly in the areas of timber and wood processing, as well as in plastics manufacturing. His son Walter Nars founded Nars Ab in 1943.

== Oy Nars Ab ==
Having originally made their fortune with timber and forestry products, the Nars family became pioneers in Finnish plastics manufacturing. In 1948, they were first in Finland to manufacture calendered PVC foils, and soon expanded the product range into plastic hose, profiles and floor coverings at their rapidly expanding manufacturing facilities in Jakobstad.

After having been hit by an acute economic crisis in the early 1960s, Oy Nars Ab was taken over by the Kansallis-Osake-Pankki bank, and subsequently sold to a competitor Wiik & Höglund, who were also active in plastics manufacturing. The fusion of the two companies developed into today's KWH Plast, a subsidiary of KWH Group, one of Finlands leading companies in plastics, abrasives and logistics services.
