= Nanoq =

Coordinates: 63°39′18″N 22°35′27″E

Nanoq (Inuit for polar bear) or The Arctic Museum is a museum in Jakobstad, Finland, specializing in arctic culture and Greenland in particular. The museum opened in 1991.

The museum hosts exhibitions about famous polar expeditions and displays many items, e.g. a replica of the balloon gondola from S.A. Andrée's fateful expedition and material from the John Phipps expedition to Svalbard around 1770, as well as several artifacts related to the Norwegian explorers Fridtjof Nansen and Roald Amundsen.

The museum opens for the summer season on June 1. In 2010, a church was inaugurated on the property.
