= Gustaf von Numers (writer) =

Finnish playwright (1848–1913)

Gustaf von Numers (born 21 March 1848 in Maxmo; died 6 February 1913 in Kannus) was a Swedish-speaking Finnish author and station master.

Numers became acquainted with the theater man Kaarlo Bergbom in 1887. Bergbom read some of Numers's plays and staged several of them at the Finnish theater in Helsinki, including his debut piece Erik Puke in 1888. Numers wrote in Swedish, but his works were performed in Finnish. He worked as a station master in Bennäs from 1884, and in Kannus from 1908 to 1913.

== Selective bibliography ==
- Bakom Kuopio (1892)
- Dramatiska arbeten (1892)
- Erik Puke, Korsholman herra (1888)
- Striden vid Tuukkala (1892)
- Nystudansen (1893)
- Utan präst (1894)
- Snälla flickor (1897)
- Tuukkas son (1902)
- Vid Lützen (1912)
- Klas Kurck och liten Elin (1928)
- Pastor Jussilainen (1896)
