= Peter Malm =

Finnish businessman

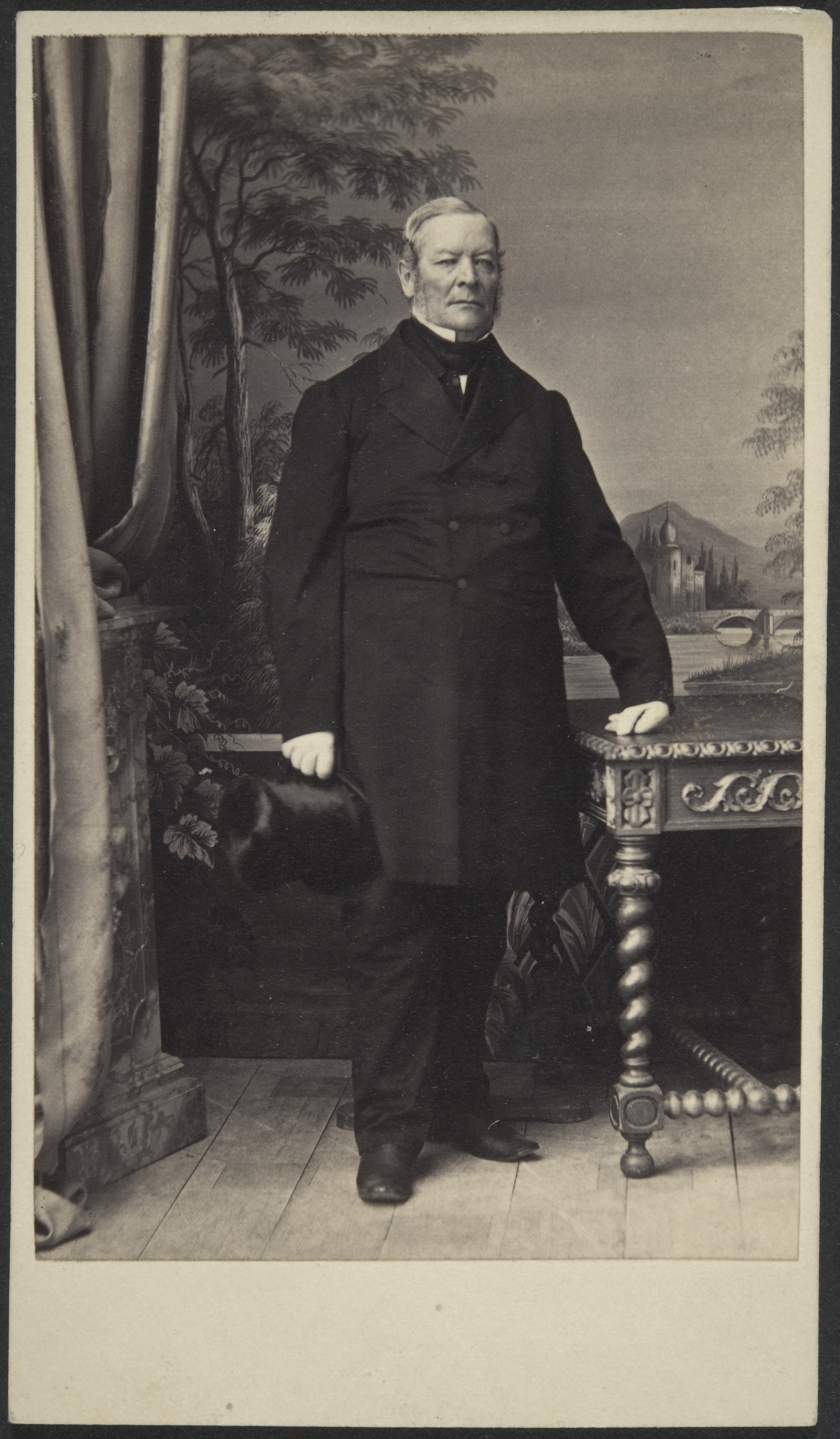
- Born: 22 September 1800; Jakobstad, Finland
- Died: 7 August 1868 (aged 67); Stockholm, Sweden
- Occupations: Ship owner and merchant

Peter Malm (22 September 1800 – 7 August 1868) was a major ship owner and merchant in the Grand Duchy of Finland in the 19th century, and the father of the shipping magnate Otto A. Malm.

== Life ==
Born in Jakobstad, Malm moved to Turku, Finland for his studies. He worked as a merchant in Liverpool between 1818 and 1824, and opened his own business in Jakobstad in 1823. As of 1840, Malm had the largest shipping fleet in Finland, consisting of 13 sailing ships. Peter Malm was the first Finnish ship owner to send his ships on transoceanic voyages. In 1845–1847, the barque Hercules was the first Finnish ship to circumnavigate the Earth.

The Crimean War was a major setback to the business, as the British and French naval operations in the Baltic Sea made it virtually impossible to conduct trade. Finland was at the time an autonomous part of the Russian empire, and thus also a target of the British-French fleet during the war.

Peter Malm founded a steam powered saw mill on the small island of Stockholmen outside Jakobstad in 1854, which was only the second such installation in Finland.
