= Wilhelm Schauman =

Finnish businessman (1857–1911)

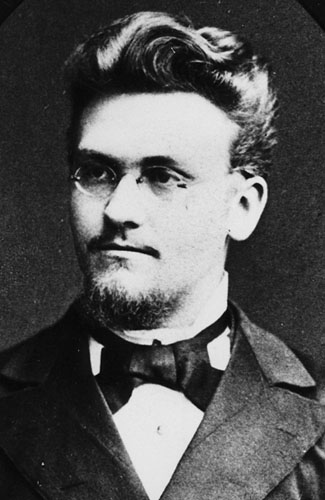
- Wilhelm Schauman, 1881.
- Born: Berndt Wilhelm Schauman; 8 November 1857; Jakobstad, Finland
- Died: 14 November 1911 (aged 54); Berlin, Germany
- Occupation: industrialist
- Spouse: Elin Wilhelmina (Mimmi) Roos (1858–1908)

Wilhelm Schauman (born 8 November 1857 in Jakobstad) was a prominent Finnish-Swedish industrialist and member of the noble Schauman family. He is best known as the founder of Finland's first veneer factory and for his significant contributions to the chicory, sugar, sawmill, and tobacco industries. He died on 14 November 1911 in Berlin.

A paper and pulp mill was also built in Jakobstad and remains the largest factory in the town. Today, it is owned by UPM-Kymmene following a merger in 1988.

== Biography ==
Wilhelm Schauman was born into an influential family, the son of pharmacist Victor Leonard Schauman and Elisabet (Elise) Vilhelmina Ekelund. The family had thirteen children, including Axel and Ossian Schauman, with ten surviving into adulthood. Five of the sons, including Wilhelm, chose a commercial path. Wilhelm studied mechanical engineering at the Polytechnic School in Helsinki and graduated in 1879. In 1882, he married Wilhelmina "Mimmi" Roos from Jakobstad, and shortly afterward, the couple moved to St. Petersburg, where Wilhelm found work at a mechanical workshop.

Four years later, Mimmi wanted to return home, and the couple moved back to Jakobstad after Wilhelm was denied a position as technical director at Serlachius Mänttä Mill, despite earlier promises. This setback led Wilhelm Schauman to start his own chicory factory in Jakobstad.

Wilhelm and Mimmi had six children: Astrid, Maria, Pehr, Bror, Erik, and Viktor. Wilhelm meticulously planned his children's futures, sending all his sons to Germany for studies. Pehr studied mechanical engineering, Bror attended a business school, Erik studied chemistry, and Viktor trained in technology.

== Career ==
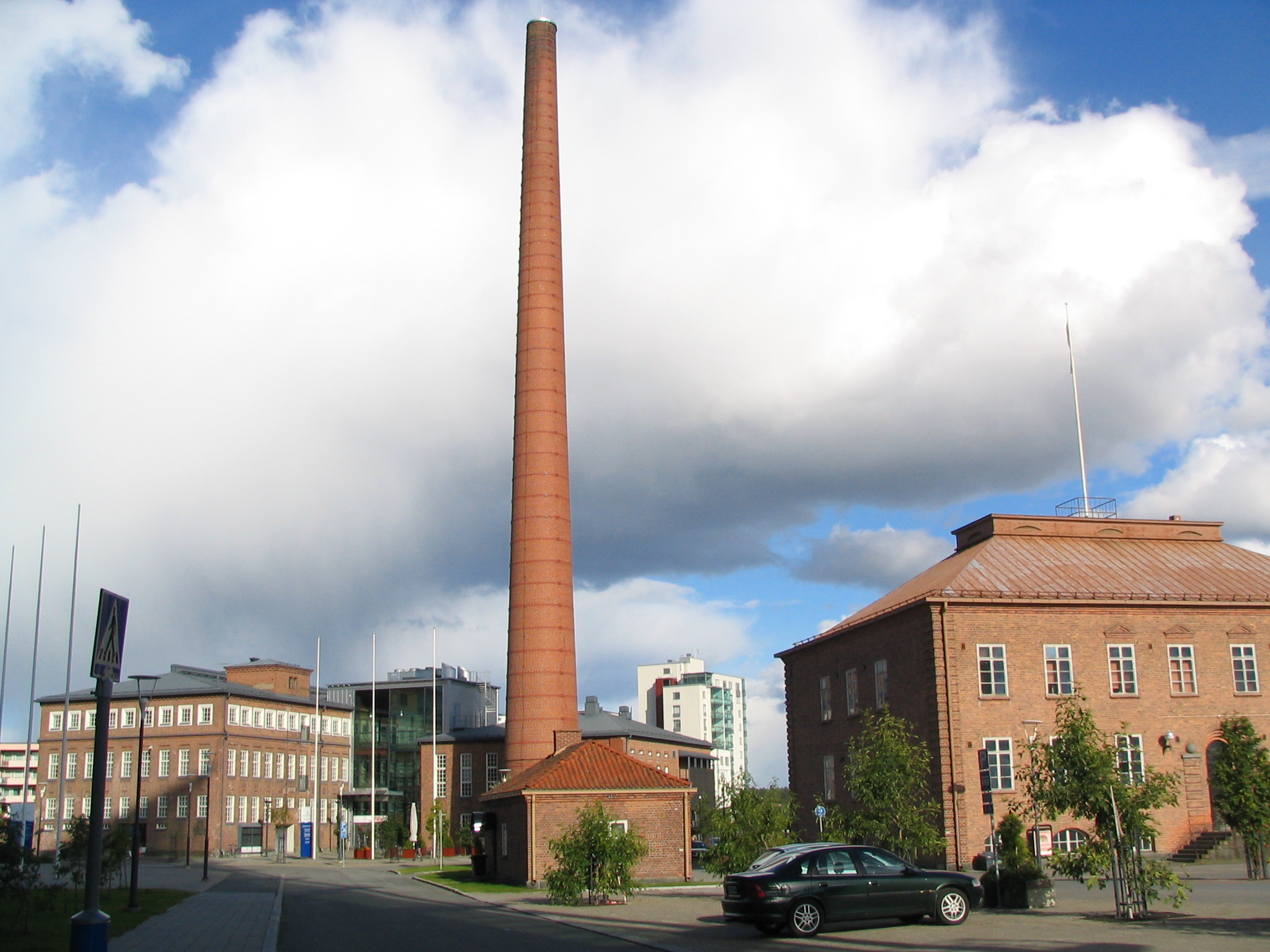
Schauman plywood factory complex in Jyväskylä. The Building is now used by the Jyväskylä University of Applied Sciences.

Wilhelm Schauman was a distinguished industrialist who founded several important companies in Finland. After completing his engineering studies and working in St. Petersburg, he returned to Jakobstad in 1883 and founded a successful chicory factory, becoming Finland's largest producer in the field.

In the mid-1890s, Schauman diversified his business to other areas, including timber exports, tugboat operations, and sawmill production. He also founded a sugar refinery at Alholmen near Jakobstad. In 1889, he joined the board of the tobacco factory Ph. U. Strengberg, in which he owned a significant stake. Seven years later, he became chairman and CEO. Strengberg Tobacco Factory was at the time the largest cigarette producer in the Nordic region and the first domestic tobacco manufacturer in the area.

Schauman continued to expand his business empire, and in 1910, he bought a steam-driven sawmill in Yxpila (near Kokkola) and founded a veneer factory in Jyväskylä. The veneer factory later became the most significant part of the business, but he died before it was completed.

Schauman's businesses in Jakobstad were based on four pillars: the sugar factory contributed nearly 50% of net profit between 1901 and 1911, timber exports accounted for 25-30%, the sawmill industry around 20%, and the chicory factory less than 5%. Schauman made very large deals for his time and, at the time of his death, was one of Finland's wealthiest people, with an estimated fortune of 2 million Finnish marks.

== Chicory Factory ==
After Wilhelm Schauman was denied a position at Serlachius Mänttä Mill, he visited chicory factories in Germany and Russia, which inspired him to start his own chicory factory in Jakobstad. The first factory was founded in 1883 in Thodén's bakery in the city center and employed 6-7 people. The business quickly became successful, leading to the construction of a second factory outside the town in 1884. Within a few years, Schauman became Finland's largest producer of chicory.

After the second factory burned down in 1892, a new factory was built near the harbor, which became operational in 1893. This factory is now a museum with preserved machinery. Initially, the raw material was imported from Germany, but Belgium later became the main supplier, followed by the Netherlands, Russia, Estonia, and Poland.

The company flourished as Schauman combined a high-quality product with competitive prices and successful marketing strategies. He employed his own agents in cities such as Helsinki, Turku, Tampere, and Vyborg, and placed great emphasis on designing attractive packaging with Russian elements like medallions and other decorations. Schauman himself traveled across Finland, inviting traders to taste his products. At the peak of chicory production, Schauman employed 60 people and produced nearly 1,400 tons of roasted and ground chicory.

Chicory production continued after Wilhelm Schauman's death and remained profitable annually between 1912 and 1935, although its contribution to the group's results was relatively modest. Demand declined over time, except during World War II when coffee shortages temporarily increased demand. The last batch of chicory was produced in February 1960, and the final delivery was made in September 1964.

== Tobacco Factory ==
However, Schauman's most significant contribution to his hometown was at Ph. U. Strengberg Tobacco Factory. The factory underwent substantial expansion and capacity increase after Schauman became its chairman in 1895. The old one-story wooden buildings were replaced with multi-story stone buildings covering two full blocks. Steam power was replaced with electric power, and new machines were purchased, primarily for the cigarette division. Between 1896 and 1911, cigarette production increased from 61 million to 308 million per year, and profits quadrupled. By the turn of the 20th century, Strengberg produced more cigarettes than all other factories in the country combined.

Thanks to successes in the tobacco industry, Strengberg opened new operations in Sweden, Norway, Denmark, and northern Germany. In 1903, a branch was opened in Härnösand, Sweden, which became very successful. The branch's cigarette sales multiplied sevenfold between 1904 and 1911, and profits increased twelvefold. Soon, Strengberg produced more cigarettes in Sweden than all other factories combined. A likely reason why tobacco production became a state monopoly in Sweden in 1915 was to eliminate competition from Finland.

== Veneer Factory ==
Wilhelm Schauman is primarily remembered for founding Finland's first veneer factory. During his last years, he initially planned to start producing box boards in Jakobstad but changed his plans after a spa visit in the Baltic states in 1910. There, he discovered the thriving veneer industry and decided to focus on veneer production instead.

Veneer manufacturing, where thin wood sheets are cross-laminated to create a strong material, became his new focus. Finland had abundant raw materials in the form of birch, which was plentiful due to slash-and-burn agriculture. In 1911, Finland's first veneer factory was founded in Jyväskylä, and Schauman obtained permits for cutting large birches in state forests around Päijänne.

The factory was nearly completed when Schauman suddenly died during a business trip in Berlin in November 1911. Despite this, production began the following year, and the factory became a great success. Veneer production quickly developed and remained the most vital part of the company for a long time.

== Legacy of Wilhelm Schauman ==
After Wilhelm Schauman's death in 1911, his business operations, according to his will, were transferred to a newly created and publicly listed company, Oy Wilhelm Schauman Ab. After selling the sugar business, the company focused on its veneer industries and eventually became a market leader in veneer products. The veneer factory in Jyväskylä was a promising and profitable new venture, flourishing in the first years of World War I. Veneer production also began in Savonlinna in 1921, and a factory in Joensuu was acquired in 1924. These factories were eventually merged under Oy Wilhelm Schauman Ab.

During World War II, the proportion of veneer products significantly increased, and in 1958, a particle board factory was opened in Jyväskylä. A particle board factory was purchased from Viiala Oy in 1962, and in 1969, Oy Wilhelm Schauman Ab opened a particle board factory in Joensuu. By the early 1990s, the company had particle board factories in Joensuu, Ristiina (Pello particle board factory), and Kitee (Puhos particle board factory).

Chicory production in Jakobstad continued after Schauman's death and remained profitable annually between 1912 and 1935, although its overall contribution to the company's results was relatively modest. Demand and production of chicory declined sharply over time, except during World War II when demand temporarily increased due to limited coffee availability. The Jakobstad factory produced its last batch of chicory in February 1960, and the final delivery was made in September 1964.

The foundation for Schauman's paper and pulp operations was laid with the construction of a sulfite pulp mill in Jakobstad in 1934. In the early 1960s, a sulfate pulp mill, paper mill, and paper sack factory were added. In the first half of the 1970s, significant investments were made in pulp production, making Schauman the largest producer of market pulp in Finland. The paper sack factory in Jakobstad soon became the largest of its kind in Finland, and in 1969, Schauman purchased the Craf’Sac factory in Rouen, France. By the early 1960s, Schauman had become a world leader in the development of veneer products and gained further market share through new and innovative methods for gluing, coating, and processing veneer, as well as using spruce as raw material.

At various times in its history, Schauman also acquired businesses unrelated to its core activities, such as furniture manufacturing and other conventional wood products. In 1971, Schauman even became a producer of large sailing yachts after purchasing Nautor, a boatyard near Jakobstad. Eventually, all such non-core businesses were divested.

In 1985, the Schauman family sold the majority of its shares in Oy Wilhelm Schauman Ab, and the forestry company Oy Kaukas Ab became its largest shareholder. In 1988, Schauman became part of Kymmene Oy, and two years later, it was reorganized as Schauman Wood Oy. Since 1996, Schauman Wood Oy has been part of the UPM-Kymmene Group.

== Sources ==
- History of UPM-Kymmene
- Chicory Museum in Jakobstad
- https://biografiasampo.fi/henkilo/p2904
