= Adolf Lindskog =

Businessman and shipbuilder (1751–1836)

- Born: Per Adolf Lindskog; 1751; Stockholm, Sweden
- Died: 30 June 1836 (aged 84–85); Jakobstad, Finland
- Occupation: Merchant
- Spouse: Anna Catharina Malm

Per Adolf Lindskog (Note: His given name is Adolph in some sources.) (1751 – 30 June 1836) was a prominent businessman and shipbuilder in Jakobstad. The town of Jakobstad was under Swedish rule until 1809, when it became part of the Grand Duchy of Finland. Born in Stockholm, Sweden, Lindskog was married to Anna Catharina Malm, the daughter of the prominent merchant and shipbuilder Niclas Malm. When Niclas Malm died in 1785, Lindskog took over the management of the Jakobstad's twist tobacco factory.

Trade started to develop rapidly in Jakobstad as of 1765, when the cities along the Finnish shore of the Gulf of Botnia were granted privileges by the Swedish crown to trade directly with foreign countries, and Jakobstad became one of the wealthiest cities per capita in Finland. This also meant brisk business for Lindskog, and he was periodically the city's wealthiest man, competing with his brother-in-law Pehr Malm for this title.

In 1797, Lindskog had built the city's first house built of stone at the market square (it is today Jakobstad's oldest house). The same year, he founded a shipyard, with the intention to concentrate all ship building in Jakobstad to the same location. This shipyard was built on Calholmen, and was named Calholmens skeppsvarv (the shipyard of Calholmen). This area is today called Varvet. During a period of 75 years, around 150 ships were built at this shipyard.
