= Otto Malm (businessman) =

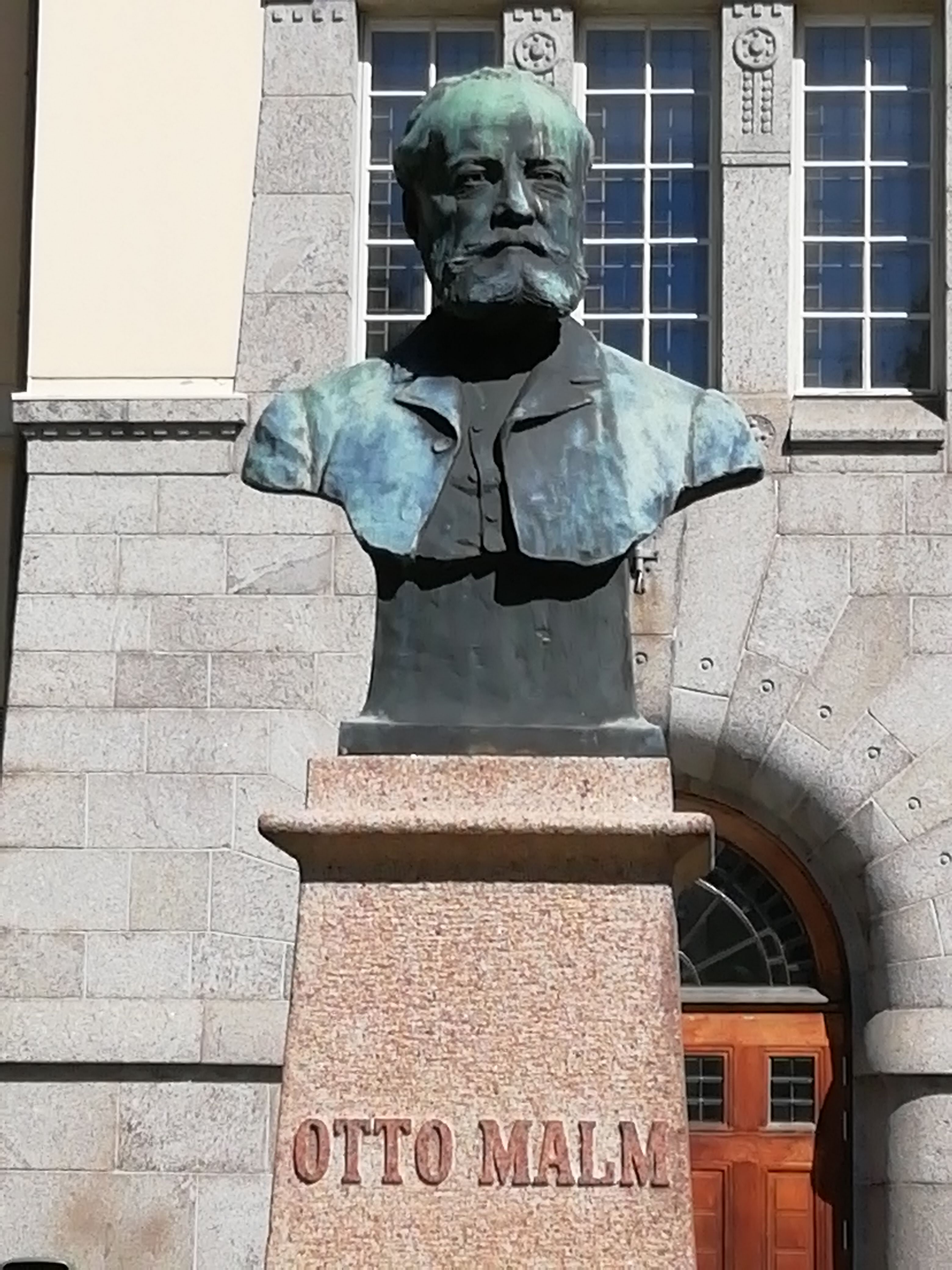
- Born: Otto August Malm; 25 July 1838; Jakobstad, Grand Duchy of Finland
- Died: 25 November 1898 (aged 60); Jakobstad, Grand Duchy of Finland
- Occupation: merchant
- Spouse: Maria Lovisa Malm (1849-1874)

Otto August Malm (25 July 1838 – 25 November 1898) was one of the most famous shipping magnates in Finland in the 19th century, and at the time of his death, the richest man in Finland.

== Life ==
Malm inherited a large fortune after his father Peter Malm, and further expanded it through many successful entrepreneurial activities. Despite being the younger of two brothers, Malm took over the management of the family business when his father died in 1868, as the older brother was deaf and deemed not fit to manage the family trading and shipping business.

Malm studied commerce at the commercial school in Rostock (Mecklenburg) between 1854–1855. After having worked abroad in England and France, he returned home to work with his father. As of 1863, Malm started to again expand the fleet of sailing ships which had been severely reduced as a consequence of the Crimean War, and at its peak in 1874, it consisted of 8 ships. In the same year, the last large sailing ship was built in Jakobstad, the frigate Vanadis. However, Malm had the foresight to divest into other business ventures such as the tobacco and forestry industry, before the increased competition from steam ships started to diminish the commercial viability of cargo sailing ships.

Malm was a dominating figure in the political life of his hometown, and also a major philanthropist. Having been married for barely a year, his pregnant wife drowned when the ship Österbotten sank after a fire on 20 August 1874. He chose never to marry again, and being without heirs, he donated large parts of his fortune to his native town Jakobstad. Among other things, these donations went to the building of a school and the main hospital in Jakobstad (Malmska Sjukhuset). In order to secure an extension of the railroad network to Jakobstad, Malm financed half of the costs for this railroad extension, while the Finnish state paid for the other half. Malm was also responsible for the first telephone installation in Jakobstad in 1882. One telephone was installed in his residence (Malmska gården), while the other was installed in the office building at his sawmill on Stockholmen.

After his death in 1898, the era of commercial sailing ships come to an end in Jakobstad, when the last sailing ships Vanadis and Europa were sold in 1899. When Malm died, he was considered to have the largest fortune in Finland, valued at 11 million Finnish mark. Although difficult to estimate, this would likely be the equivalent of several hundred million euro today.
