= Folkhälsan =

Samfundet Folkhälsan
- Founded: 1921
- Founder: Ossian Schauman
- Type: NGO
- Purpose: Public health
- Location: Helsinki, Finland
- Region served: Swedish-speaking Finland
- Members: 19,000
- Employees: 1,400

Samfundet Folkhälsan, or in short Folkhälsan (literally "Public Health"), is a non-governmental organization based in Finland. It is active in advocating social welfare and health care for the Swedish speakers of Finland. The organization carries out scientific research and informs and counsels in order to promote health and good quality of life. Folkhälsan’s activities include assistance, support, education, and care, being present at every stage of life. Founded in 1921, Folkhälsan employs today approximately 1,400 people. The local associations across Swedish-speaking Finland have almost 19,000 members. Folkhälsan works towards a society where health and quality of life are central concerns.

The organization was founded in 1921 by Ossian Schauman and a number of other doctors who wanted to reduce child mortality and cases of tuberculosis in Finland. The NGO was combining practical work with research already from the very start.

About 100 researchers do research into inheritable diseases and illnesses attributed to lifestyles. A further 1,400 persons work for, and some 19,000 persons pay membership to the organization.

Folkhälsan funds its activities by selling its services to the municipalities. Certain municipalities, like the town of Karis, have allocated its entire health care to Folkhälsan. The NGO also has activities within child care and the care of the elderly. Further sources of income are private donations and funding from the Finnish Slot Machine Association (RAY).

Folkhälsan organizes Finland's national Saint Lucy's Day celebrations in Helsinki. In 2024, Daniela Owusu was elected by public vote to represent Saint Lucy at the celebrations. Owusu, Finland's first Black Saint Lucia, and her family, received thousands of racist messages and attacks on social media. In response, Folkhälsan raised over 653,704.19 euros during a social media campaign to stand against racism.
