= Galeas =

Type of small merchant sailing ship

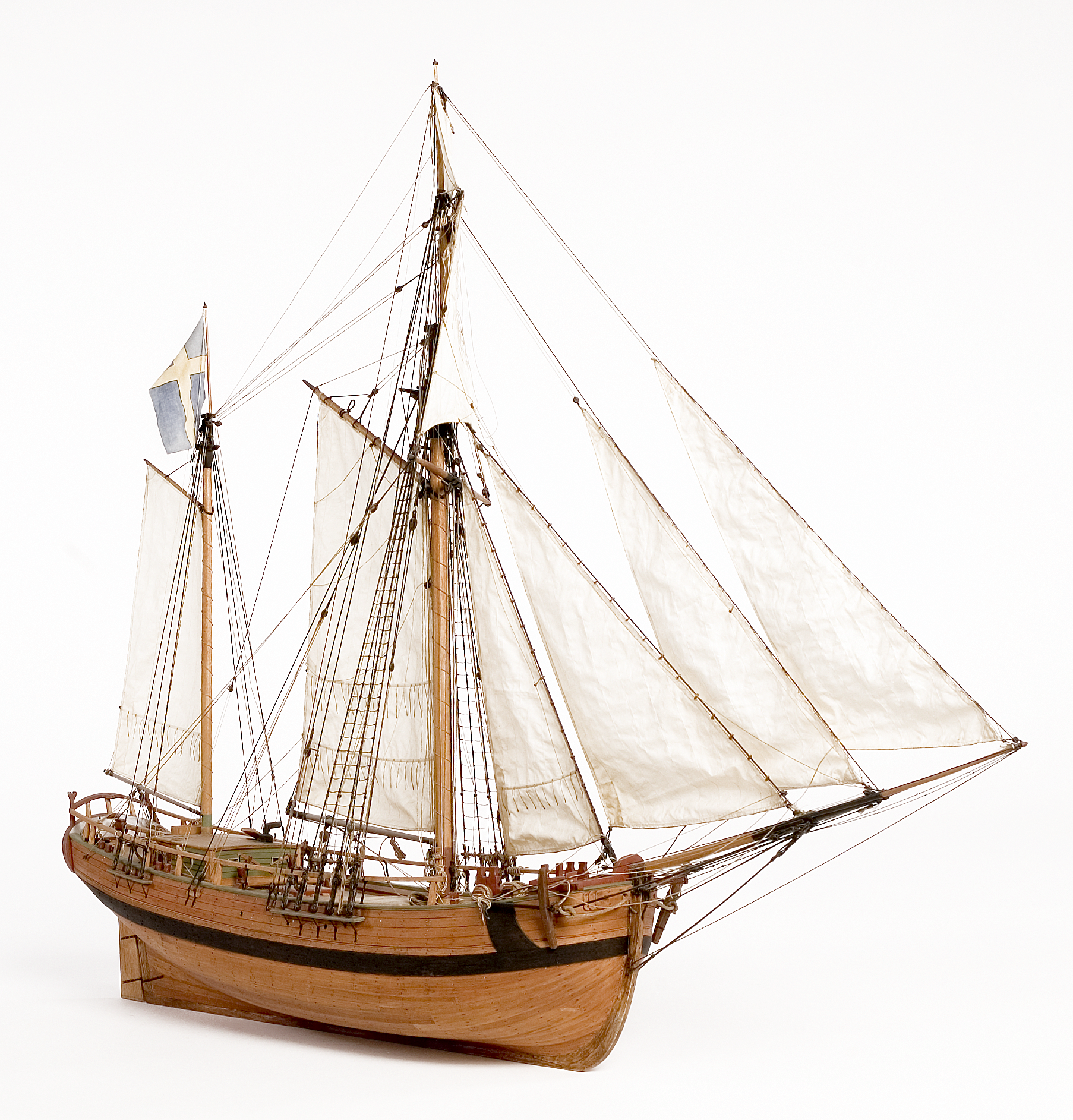
Model of a galeas from the collections of the Maritime Museum in Stockholm

A galeas is a type of small trade vessel that was common in the Baltic Sea and North Sea from the 17th to the early 20th centuries. The characteristics of the ships depend somewhat from where the ship originated. Swedish variants had two masts and were rigged as ketches or sometimes as schooners. The galeas was developed from the Dutch galliot, which was rigged in a similar way, but was equipped with a rounded stern. The Swedish galliot was sometimes called "Dutch hoy" or "English dogger". The galeas has a galliot's rig, but with a square stern.

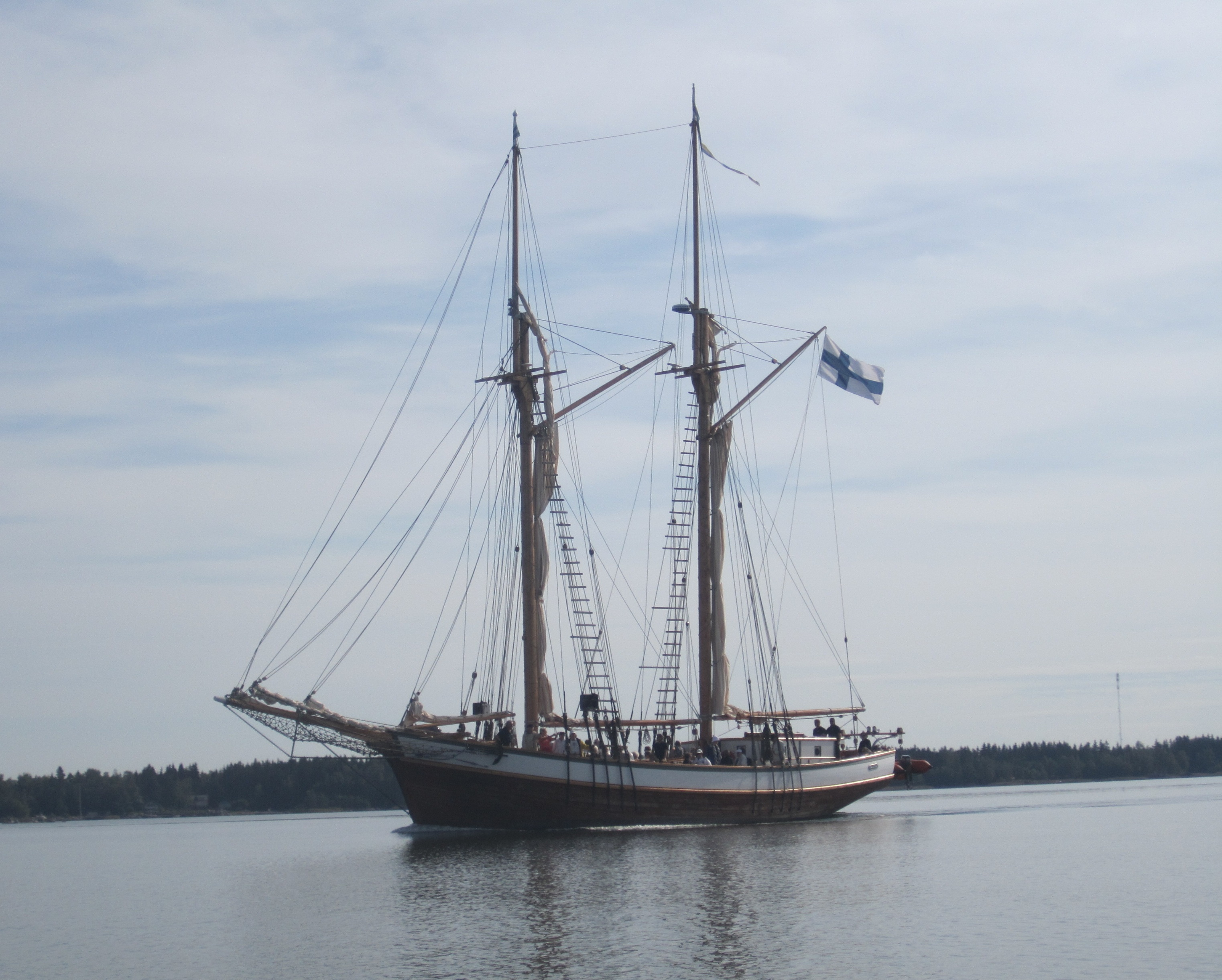
Finnish galeas Ihana with her sails down.

== Sources ==
- Skonare (skonert), brigantin, brigg (in Swedish)
- Nordisk familjebok (in Swedish)
- 18th century galeas from Stettin, Germany High resolution photos of a model
