= Empress Elizabeth's Manifesto of 1742 =

Historical document

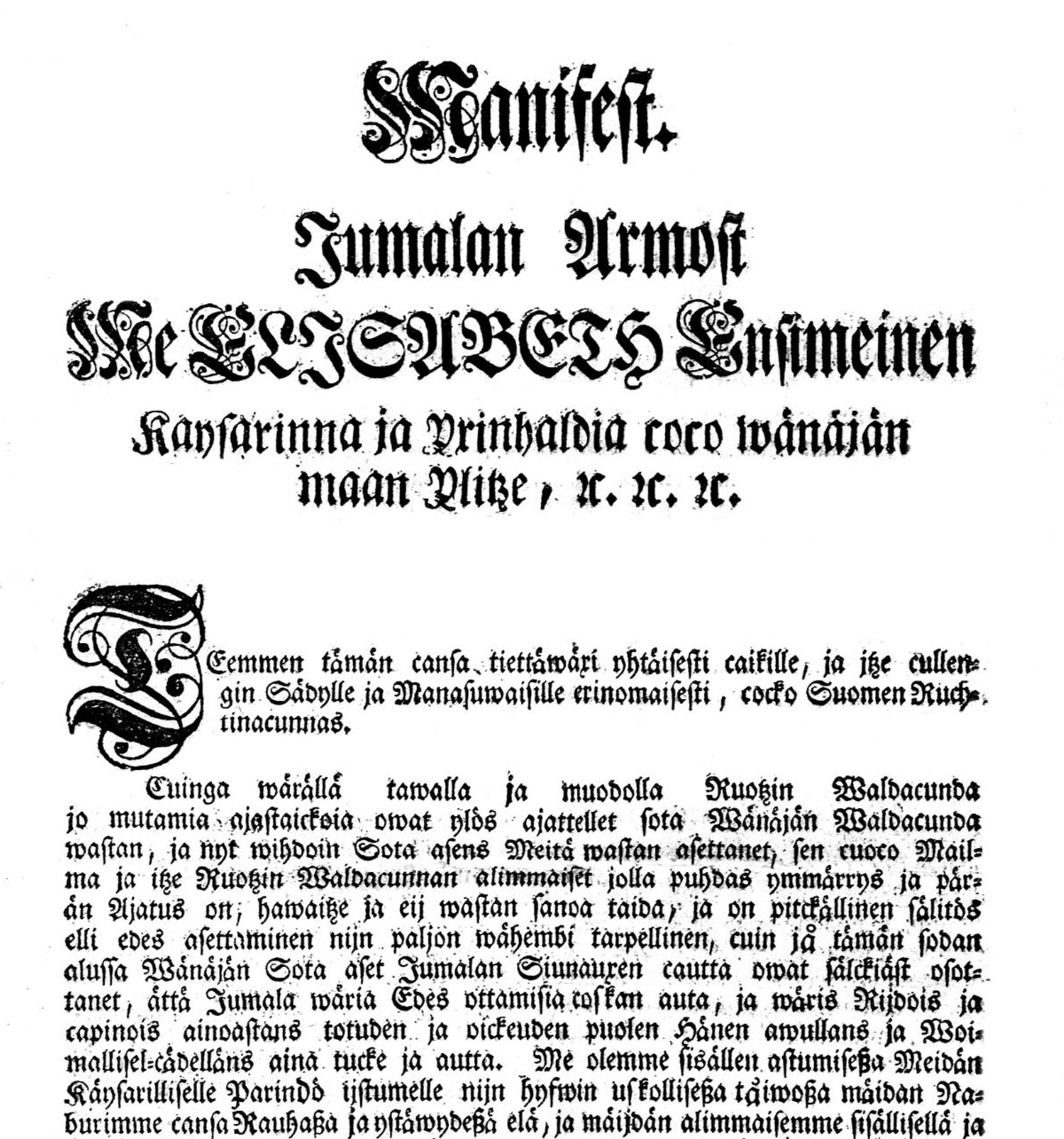
The manifest of 1742 in Finnish

In March 1742, during the Russo-Swedish War of 1741–1743, Empress Elizabeth of Russia issued a manifesto addressed to the people of Finland, at the time part of the Kingdom of Sweden. The manifesto promised peace and protection if Finns refrained from supporting the Swedish army. It also suggested that Finland could break away from Swedish rule and establish an autonomous government under Russian protection.

During the subsequent occupation, Finnish representatives sent a deputation to petition Empress Elizabeth to place Duke Charles Peter Ulrich of Holstein-Gottorp (the future Emperor Peter III of Russia) at the head of such a state. However, Elizabeth refused to receive the deputation, and the idea came to nothing. Under the Treaty of Åbo (Turku) in 1743, most of Finland was returned to Sweden, while the area east of the Kymi River was ceded to Russia.

The manifesto is historically significant as the first known document to suggest the possibility of an autonomous Finnish state. Such state was later realized with the creation of the Grand Duchy of Finland in 1809.

== Elizabeth's manifesto ==
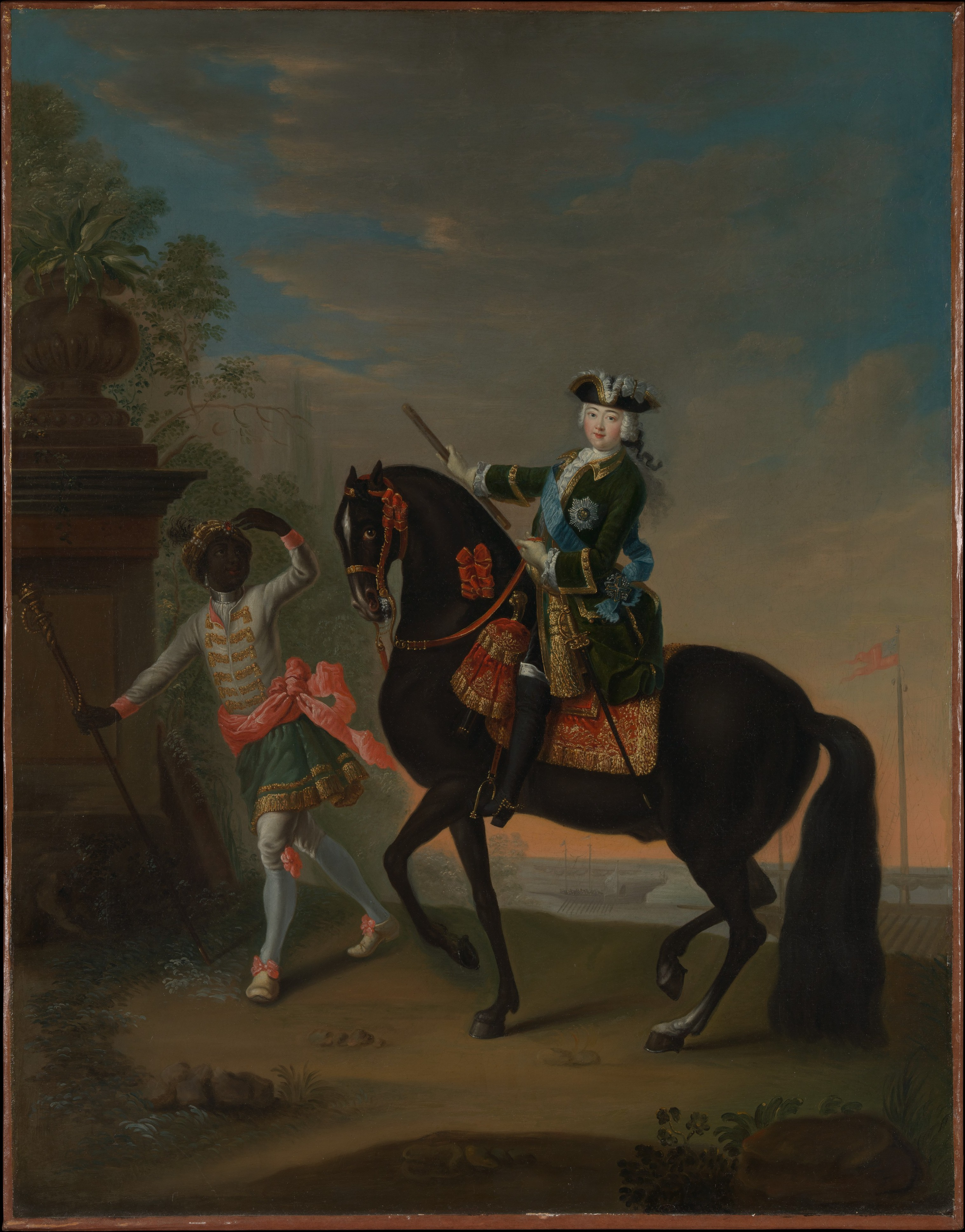
The Empress Elizabeth of Russia on Horseback, Attended by a Page, circa 1740s, in the collection of the Metropolitan Museum of Art.

The Russo-Swedish War of 1741–1743 was instigated by the Hats, a Swedish political party that aspired to regain the territories lost to Russia during the Great Northern War. The Hats declared war on Russia in July 1741, but Swedish inaction after the declaration allowed Russia to seize the initiative and launch the first attack. The Swedish forces were defeated at the Battle of Villmanstrand (Lappeenranta) in August 1741. Despite the loss, the Swedes started to plan for an attack towards Vyborg.

In November, Elizabeth, with the support of the Russian Guards regiments, made a successful coup d'état in Russia. In early December she offered a truce to Sweden, which the Swedish commander Charles Emil Lewenhaupt accepted, anticipating that it would lead to border negotiations. This expectation was shattered in February 1742, when Elizabeth denounced the truce. The Russian main army did not attempt to advance during the winter.

On 18 March 1742 Empress Elizabeth issued a manifesto that was distributed among the Finnish population in Finnish, Swedish and German. The manifesto declared that responsibility for the war rested with Sweden, not with the people of Finland, and that although Russia had been compelled to send troops into the country, it had not come "to destroy or oppress anyone," nor to annex a "foot's-breadth" of foreign land.

Elizabeth's manifesto promised that Russia would grant Finland independence—"as a free country, under the dominion of no power"—provided that the Finns desired it and ceased resistance. If, however, they continued to support the Swedish army, the manifesto warned that Russia would devastate the land "by fire and the sword's edge."

It is uncertain whether the manifesto was intended as a genuine proposal to create a buffer state between Russia and Sweden, or merely as war propaganda designed to weaken the morale of the Swedish army and sow discord between Finns and Swedes. The manifesto caused alarm in Stockholm, prompting the Swedish government to issue a counter-manifesto affirming its confidence in the loyalty of both the Finns and the Swedes. It warned them not to trust Russian promises of independence, asserting that such claims were merely a ruse to subjugate neighboring nations.

The authorship of Elizabeth's manifest has also been a matter of debate. In an attempt renew the truce, Lewenhaupt had dispatched Colonel Carl Otto Lagercrantz to negotiate with the Russian commander Peter von Lacy. When von Lacy proved unable to authorize a truce, Lagercrantz had continued on to Moscow against his orders. There, he issued a declaration stating that Sweden was satisfied with the pre-war borders, an act that Lewenhaupt regarded as treasonous. Lagercrantz may also have played a role in drafting Empress Elizabeth’s manifesto: before the war, he had argued that the loss of Finland would be a small price to pay if the war turned against Sweden, and when he returned from Russia to Lewenhaupt's headquarters, he carried with him a French translation of the manifesto.

== Diet of Turku ==
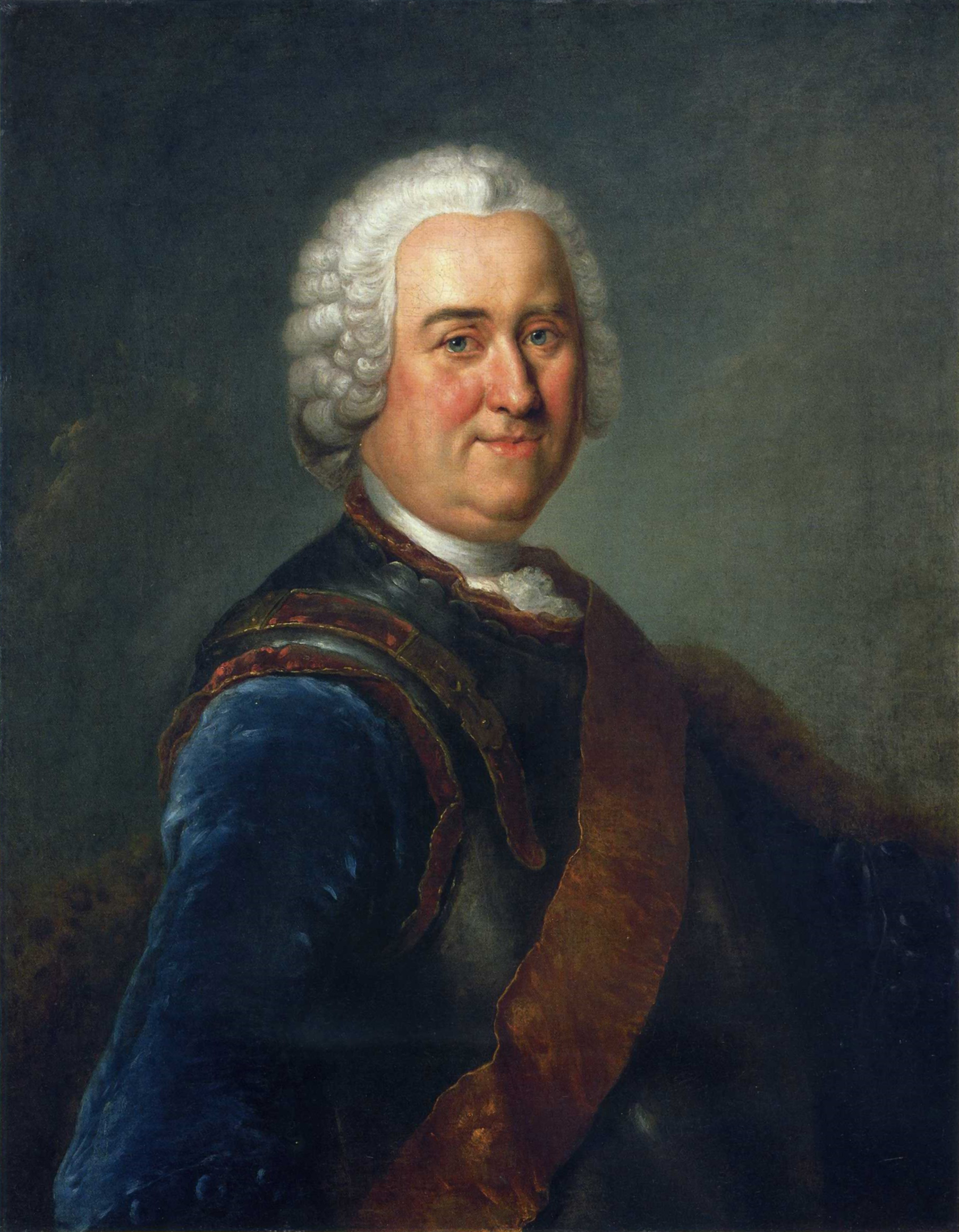
James Keith was a Scottish mercenary in the service of Russia and Prussia.

The Russian army began advancing into Finland in June 1742, encountering almost no resistance due to ineffective Swedish military leadership and forces. On 24 August 1742, the Swedish troops surrendered at Helsinki (Helsingfors) to an equally strong Russian army without a fight, allowing Russia to occupy all of Finland.

General James Keith, a Scottish mercenary responsible for the occupying Russian forces in the south, called for the estates of southwestern Finland — roughly today's Southwest Finland and Satakunta — to meet at lantdag (Diet) in Turku (Åbo) on 8 (or 18) October 1742. Each city and hundred was to send one from nobility and two from clergy, bourgeoisie and peasants to discuss matters important for the "cities and the whole country".

Known representatives that showed up in the city were e.g. freiherrs i.e. barons Henrik Rehbinder and Johannes Gripenberg, vicars from Loimaa, Halikko, Pöytyä and Maaria and mayors of Rauma and Pori. Names of peasants have not survived. On the official agenda presented by Keith were mostly daily proceedings, but Russians also assured to nominate only local officials and improve usage of the Finnish language in the domestic administration. Encouraged by Russians' earlier promises of independence, friendly occupation and their own apparent willingness to seize the moment, Finns decided to send a deputation to ask Duke Charles Peter Ulrich of Holstein-Gottorp (later Peter III or Russia) to be the Grand Duke of Finland. It is not known how the lantdag reached that decision as no official records of the meeting have survived, but from Russians' internal correspondence it seems evident that it was on the Finns' initiative. Preparations to form a delegation to present the Empress with the request started.

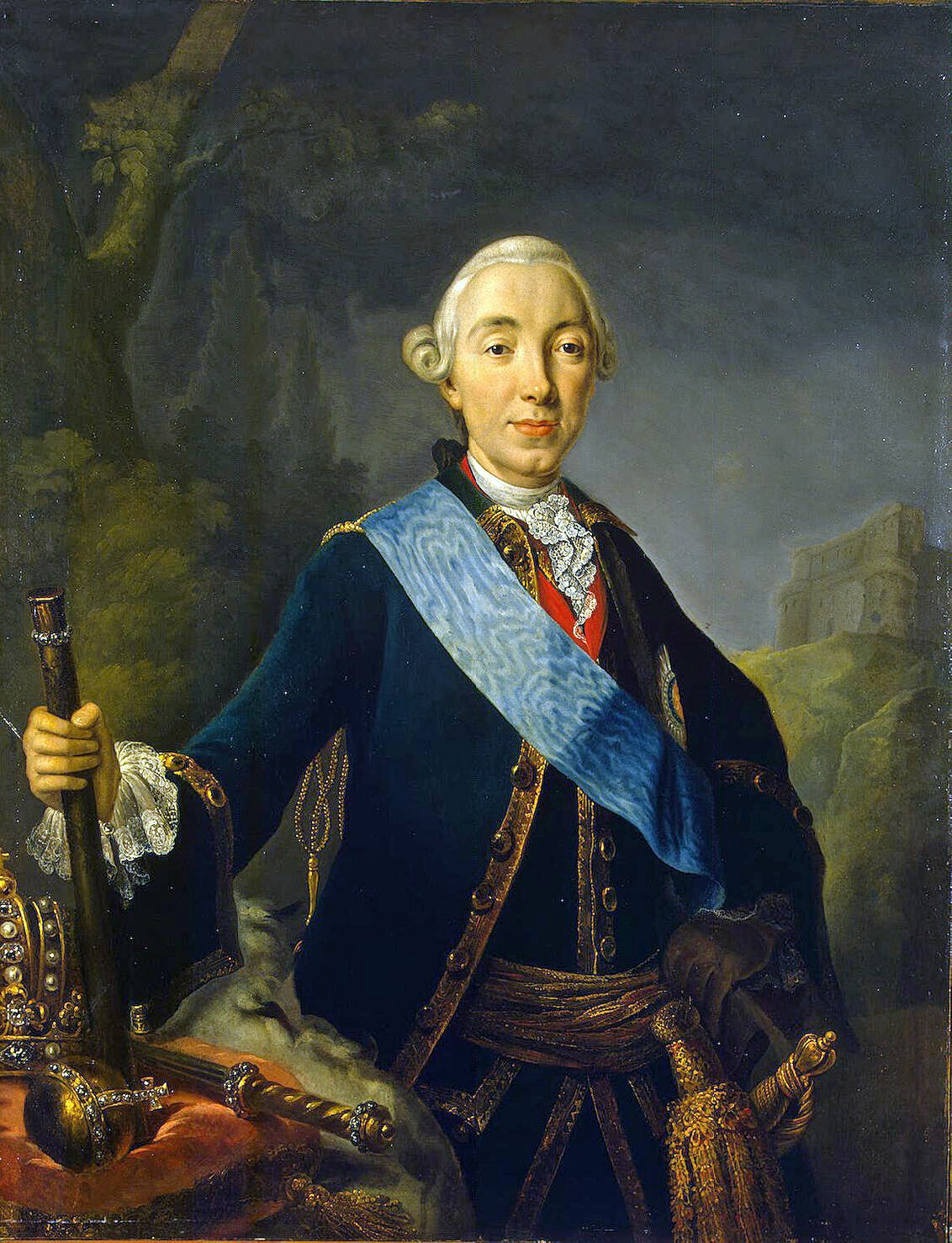
Duke Charles Peter Ulrich

At the same time, the riksdag of Sweden had gathered in Stockholm, trying to find a way out of the military and political situation generated by the Hats' hasty and ill-advised war. As King Frederick I was without an heir apparent, the Swedish estates decided to use the future crown in negotiations, also selecting the same Duke as the next King of Sweden.

Events were however developing at a fast pace. Russian troops had taken over Finland with much ease, and Elizabeth decided to make Duke Charles Peter Ulrich her own heir to the Imperial throne, as she was without an heir apparent herself. The Swedish parliament was unaware of this, and when their envoy arrived in Saint Petersburg, it was too late. The underage duke's succession rights to Sweden were renounced on his behalf.

New negotiations were thus opened, and Elizabeth agreed to restore the greater part of Finland if her cousin, Adolph Frederick of Holstein, was elected successor to the Swedish crown, thus concluding the war by the Treaty of Turku on 7 August 1743.

In late 1742, general Keith was succeeded in the leadership of civil administration of Finland (based at Turku) by the new Governor-General, Johannes Balthasar von Campenhausen.

== Aftermath ==
In general, the manifesto or the events of the Diet of Turku in 1742 had no direct consequences after the Russian occupation ended the following year. Elizabeth's new candidate was elected as the next King of Sweden, and Sweden ceded the territories east of Kymi River to Russia. Nevertheless, the events bore a resemblance to those of the Finnish War seventy years later, when the Finnish estates gathered at the Diet of Porvoo and swore their oaths of loyalty to Emperor Alexander I of Russia as Grand Duke of Finland. According to Georg Magnus Sprengtporten, a politician who played a key role in organizing Finland's transfer to Russia, the 1742 manifesto had provided the initial inspiration for his political plans to establish the Grand Duchy of Finland as a buffer state between Russia and Sweden.

Häkkinen and Sippu mention that still in the 1790s, certain farmers of the villages of Liikkala, Mämmälä and Ruotila in Old Finland, lodged a claim in court where they pleaded certain provisions of the 1742 Manifest of Empress Elisabeth among other points of law to support their position in that lawsuit. This implies that the 1742 manifest and the "statehood" of the ephemeral 1742 kingdom were still regarded as part of the fundamental rights in the Russian-held Old Finland.

== See also ==
- Walhalla-orden
- Monarchy of Finland
- Anjala conspiracy
- Kingdom of Finland
