= Henrik Magnus von Buddenbrock =

Swedish baron and Lieutenant General

Lieutenant general Baron Henrik Magnus von Buddenbrock
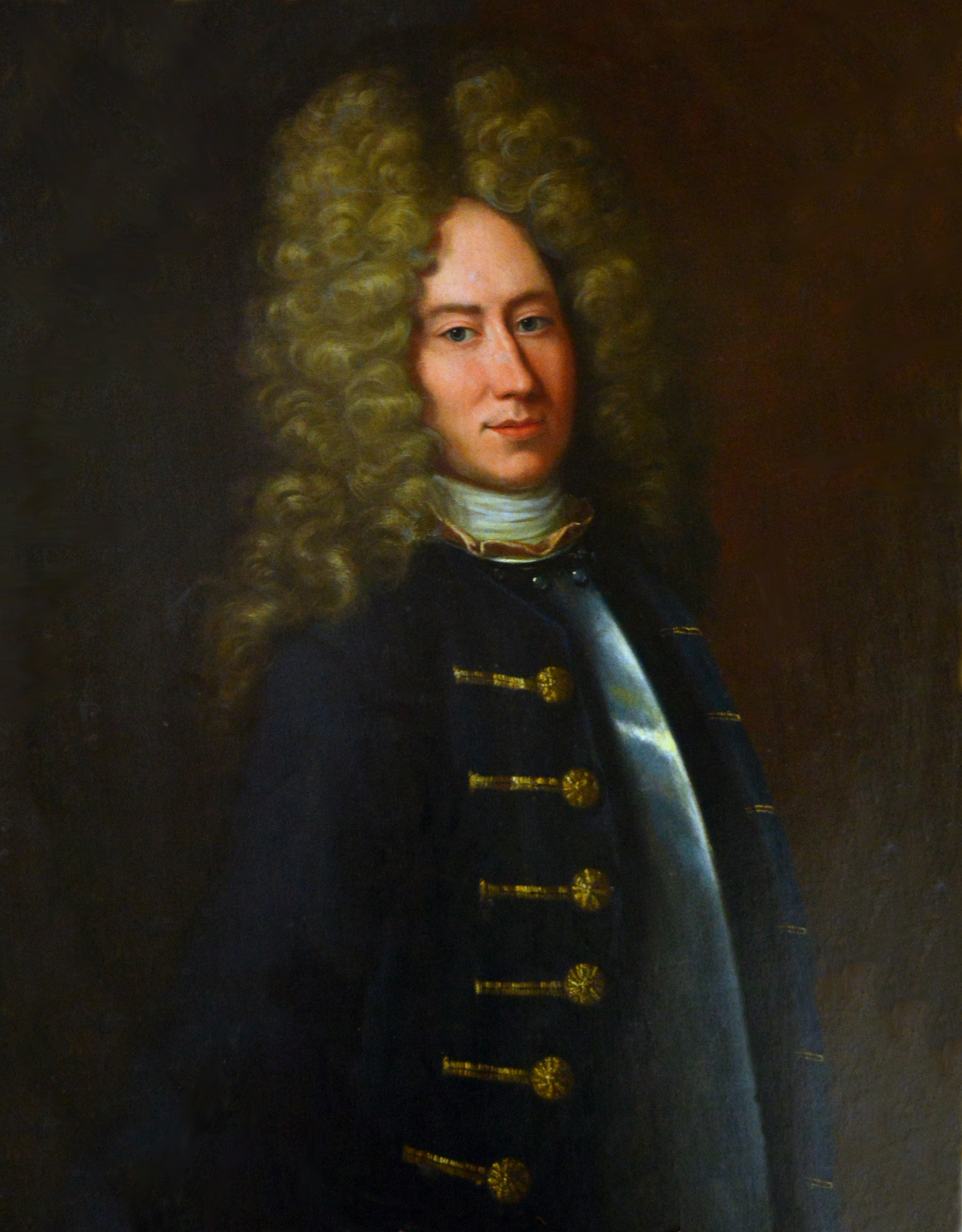
- Born: 22 July 1685; Swedish Livonia, Swedish Empire
- Died: 16 July 1743 (aged 57); Stockholm, Sweden
- Military career
- Allegiance: Swedish Empire; Sweden
- Branch: Swedish Army
- Service years: 1702–1743
- Rank: Lieutenant general
- Conflicts: Great Northern War; Russo-Swedish War (1741–1743)

Henrik Magnus von Buddenbrock (22 July 1685 – between 16 and 27 July 1743) was a Swedish baron and Lieutenant General. He and Carl Emil Lewenhaupt were executed for negligence in the Russo-Swedish War, in the aftermath of the defeat at Villmanstrand.

== Biography ==
He was born on 22 July 1685 in Swedish Livonia. He was the son of the landed gentleman and Swedish Empire army officer Henrik Gotthard von Buddenbrock and Charlotta Cronman. He enlisted as an officer of the Swedish army, becoming a captain of the Life Guards in 1711, Major of grenadiers in 1715, Major General in 1721. He was elevated to friherre (matricle number 206) in 1731 and promoted to Lieutenant General of the infantry in 1739. As such, he was in 1741 commander of the troops in Finland, under General Charles Emil Lewenhaupt, at the onset of the Russo-Swedish War.

On 23 August 1741 (3 September 1741) Swedish Major General Carl Henrik Wrangel and his corps in Villmanstrand in Karelia, at the long disputed frontier between Sweden and Russia, was attacked and defeated by a Russian army under General Peter Lacy before Buddenbrock, less than 10 kilometers away, could come to his assiantance.

As the war was developing unfavorably for Sweden, the defeat was blamed on Lewenhaupt and Buddenbrock. In August 1742 they were dismissed from Finland and immediately arrested by Vice Admiral Ritterstolpe upon their return. On the night of 28 September Buddenbrock was brought to Stockholm, where he was imprisoned and closely guarded. A court martial was convened under Field Marshal Hugo Johan Hamilton (sv) on 8 October to investigate the two cases. The prosecutor was Chancellor of Justice Silverschildt, who submitted an extensive indictment. Buddenbrock was accused of, among other things, not assembling his troops in a timely fashion to cross the Russian border, as planned. In addition he had not arrived at Villmanstrand in time to rescue Major General Wrangel.

Buddenbrock defended himself so well, that had he only faced the nobility, he would have left with his life. However the other Estates of the Riksdag, in particular the peasants, were embittered and demanded a scapegoat. The verdict of the commission was announced to a large congregation on 29 May. Buddenbrock was to be dishonored, his property confiscated, and he himself beheaded with an axe. In an appeal, Buddenbrock wrote a comprehensive account where he detailed his services to the kingdom, but despite this and the pleading of his family, the verdict was confirmed by the Estates the following day. Even a request to be beheaded with a sword as befitting a nobleman, or to be executed by firing squad was denied. The date of his execution was set to 20 July but king Frederick postponed it another week. On 27 July 1743 General von Buddenbrock was executed in Stockholm. His wife, Magdalena Elisabeth Rahm, and their four children left Sweden for the Netherlands.

== Children ==
- Magdalena Elisabeth von Buddenbrock (1717–1768), she married her cousin Carl Magnus von Buddenbrock (died 1778)
- Friedrich Magnus von Buddenbrock (1719–c.1785)
- Ulrike Dorothea von Buddenbrock (1721–1788) married in 1743 to Cornet Isaac Tham
- Carl Heinrich von Buddenbrock (1725–1745) Swedish Lieutenant who was killed in action at Tournay

== See also ==
- Carl Emil Lewenhaupt
