= Magdalena Elisabeth Rahm =

Dutch expatriate in Sweden

Magdalena Elisabeth de Ram van Hagedoorn (1687 – 21 November 1752 in Bergen-op-Zoom), was a Swedish (originally Dutch) politically active salon-holder during the Age of Liberty.

She was born in 1687 in Steenbergen in the Netherlands as the daughter of the Dutch colonel of the Aquila regiment Fredrik de Ram van Hagedoorn and Elisabeth Ruysch van Wayestein van Pijlsweert. She married the Swedish colonel lieutenant Baron Henrik Magnus von Buddenbrock in Utrecht 11 July 1706, and settled with him in Sweden. Magdalena Elisabeth Rahm was politically active in Sweden as the host of a political salon, and is foremost known for her support of the Russo-Swedish War (1741–1743), which is considered to have contributed to its realisation in 1741. After the execution of her spouse in 1743 she left for the Netherlands with her children, where she was the heir of large estates around Steenbergen after her brother.
