= Carl Wrangel =

Carl Wrangel may refer to:

- Carl Gustaf Wrangel (1613–1676), Swedish statesman and military commander
- Carl Henrik Wrangel (1681–1755), officer of the Swedish Army
