= Grand Duke of Finland =

Title of the ruler of Finland

The Grand Duke of Finland, (Note: Finnish: Suomen suuriruhtinas, Swedish: Storfurste av Finland, Russian: Великий князь Финляндский, romanized: Velikiy knyaz' Finlyandskiy, IPA: [vʲɪˈlʲikɪj knʲæsʲ fʲɪnˈlʲan(t)skʲɪj]) alternatively the Grand Prince of Finland, was a title used by most Swedish monarchs from 1580 to 1720. The title was first adopted by King Johan III of Sweden, who had been the duke of Finland in 1556–1563. It was briefly revived in 1802–1805 for Prince Carl Gustav, who died in childhood.

In 1809, after Finland was ceded to Russia, it became the autonomous Grand Duchy of Finland. Between 1809 and 1917, the emperor of Russia held the title of Grand Duke of Finland as the ruler of the grand duchy.

== Swedish rule ==
Around 1580, King Johan III of Sweden, who had previously (1556–63) been the duke of Finland (a royal duke), assumed the subsidiary title Grand Duke of Finland (Swedish: Storfurste, Finnish: Suomen suuriruhtinas) to the titles of the king of Sweden, first appearing in sources in 1581 (though first used by Johan III in 1577). In those years, Johan was and had been in a quarrel with his eastern neighbour, Tsar Ivan IV of Russia ("the Terrible"), who had a long list of subsidiary titles as the grand duke of several ancient Russian principalities and provinces. The use of the title of grand duke on Johan's behalf was a countermeasure to signify his mighty position as sovereign of Sweden, also a multinational or multi-country realm, and equal to a tsardom. Not only was Finland added, but Karelia, Ingria, and Livonia, all of which were along the Swedish–Russian border. It is said that the first use of the new title was in an occasion to contact Tsar Ivan.

During the next 140 years, the title was used by Johan's successors on the Swedish throne, with the exception of Charles IX, who listed Finns as one of the many nations over which he was the king during 1607–1611. As the title had only subsidiary nature without any concrete meaning, it was mainly used at formal occasions along with a long list of additional royal titles. The last Swedish monarch to use the title was Queen Ulrika Eleonora, who abdicated in 1720.

In 1802, to strengthen the unity between Finland and the rest of the kingdom, King Gustav IV Adolf gave the title to his newborn second son, Prince Carl Gustaf. The plan was for the prince to receive his education at the Royal Academy of Turku. Russia disapproved of the title, and Emperor Alexander I responded by renaming the Russian part of Finland the Finland Governorate. Prince Carl Gustaf died three years later in 1805.

Portrait	Grand Duke	Reign began	Reign ended	Death	Consort
	John III of Sweden	1581	17 November 1592		Catherine Jagiellon
	John III of Sweden	1581	17 November 1592		Gunilla Bielke
	Sigismund III Vasa	17 November 1592	24 July 1599 (deposed)	30 April 1632	Anne of Austria, Queen of Poland
	Charles IX of Sweden	22 March 1604	30 October 1611		Christina of Holstein-Gottorp
	Gustavus Adolphus II	30 October 1611	6 November 1632		Maria Eleonora of Brandenburg
	Christina, Queen of Sweden	6 November 1632	6 June 1664 (abdicated)	19 April 1689	
	Charles X Gustav	6 June 1664	13 February 1660		Hedwig Eleonora of Holstein-Gottorp
	Charles XI of Sweden	13 February 1660	5 April 1697		Ulrika Eleonora of Denmark
	Charles XII of Sweden	5 April 1697	30 November 1718		
	Ulrika Eleonora of Sweden	5 December 1718	29 February 1720 (abdicated)	24 November 1741	Frederick I of Sweden

== Russian rule ==
Coat of arms of the Grand Duke of Finland in the Russian Empire.

During the Finnish War between Sweden and Russia, the four estates of occupied Finland were assembled at the Diet of Porvoo on 29 March 1809. There they pledged allegiance to Emperor Alexander I of Russia, who had already earlier in the war added Grand Duke of Finland to his long imperial title. Following the Sweden's defeat and the signing of the Treaty of Fredrikshamn on 17 September 1809, Finland was formally ceded to Russia. The territory became the autonomous Grand Duchy of Finland under the Russian emperor, who personally held the grand ducal title.

From mid-19th century onwards, Finnish officials increasingly interpreted this arrangement as a personal union between two separate states, Russia and Finland, linked only by a common monarch. They considered the grand duke to be a constitutional monarch bound by the Swedish constitutional laws of 1772 and 1789, which they understood to remain in force in Finland. Russian officials and legal scholars generally rejected this view, regarding the emperor as an autocrat over the entire Empire, not constrained by such laws.

In practice, the emperor ruled Finland through his governor-general and the Finnish senate, both appointed by him. Although no emperor ever explicitly recognised Finland as a separate state in its own right, the country nevertheless enjoyed a high degree of autonomy, maintaining its own laws, currency, and substantial self-administration until its independence in 1917.

=== List of grand dukes ===
Portrait	Grand Duke	Reign began	Reign ended	Death	Consort
	Alexander I	17 September 1809	1 December 1825		Elizabeth Alexeievna
	Alexander I	Became ruler of the Grand Duchy of Finland following the Treaty of Fredrikshamn in 1809.			
	Nicholas I	25 December 1825	2 March 1855		Alexandra Feodorovna
	Nicholas I	Brother of Alexander I			
	Alexander II	2 March 1855	13 March 1881		Maria Alexandrovna
	Alexander II	Son of Nicholas I			
	Alexander III	13 March 1881	1 November 1894		Maria Feodorovna
	Alexander III	Son of Alexander II			
	Nicholas II	1 November 1894	15 March 1917 (abdicated)	17 July 1918, Yekaterinburg (murdered)	Alexandra Feodorovna
	Nicholas II	Son of Alexander III. Abdicated during the February Revolution.			

== Since independence ==
Finland was declared an independent nation state on 6 December 1917. After the Civil War in 1918, there was a brief attempt to make Finland a kingdom from 9 October to 14 December 1918.

In 1919, Finland adopted a republican constitution. Since then, all titles of monarchs are obsolete in the country.

== See also ==
- Anjala conspiracy
- Dukes of Swedish Provinces
- Finnish Declaration of Independence
- Governor-General of Finland
- History of Finland
- List of Finnish monarchs
- Monarchy of Finland

== Bibliography ==
- Jussila, Osmo; Hentilä, Seppo; Nevakivi, Jukka (1999). From Grand Duchy to a Modern State. London: Hurst & Company. ISBN 1-85065-421-2. Translated by David and Eva-Kaisa Arter.
- Katajala, Kimmo (2023). "Inventing the Grand Duchy of Finland in the 1580s: early modern state formation or medieval patterns of expressing the power". Scandinavian Journal of History. 48 (3): 273–298. doi:10.1080/03468755.2023.2200805. ISSN 0346-8755.
- "Storfurste". Nordisk familjebok / 1800-talsutgåvan (in Swedish). Vol. 20. Supplement. C - Öxnevalla. 1899. p. 2094.
