= Treaty of Åbo =

Treaty ending the Russo-Swedish War of 1741–43

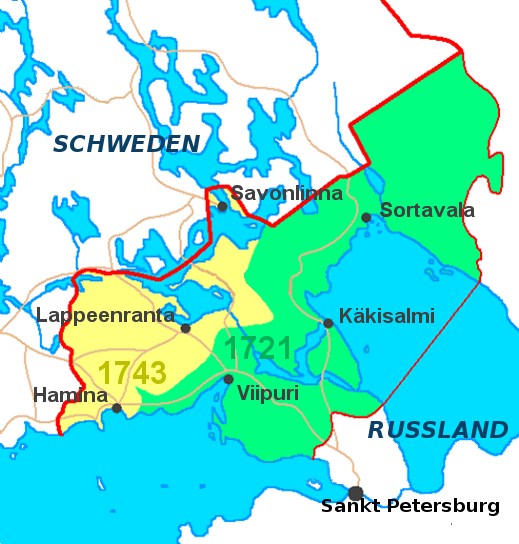
- Old Finland. The area in yellow was given to the Russian empire.
- Signed: 18 August 1743
- Location: Åbo (Turku), Sweden
- Original signatories: Russia; Sweden

The Treaty of Åbo, or the Treaty of Turku, was a peace treaty signed between the Russian Empire and Sweden in Åbo (Turku) on 18 August [O.S. 7 August] 1743 in the end of the Russo-Swedish War of 1741–1743.

== History ==
By the end of the war, the Imperial Russian Army had occupied most of Finland, prompting Field Marshal Trubetskoy and Chancellor Aleksey Bestuzhev to demand the application of uti possidetis principle in this case. By acquiring Finland, Russian politicians aspired to move the Swedish border considerably to the north, thus reducing the danger of Swedish attack on the Russian capital, Saint Petersburg. In the hope of gaining independence, the Finnish estates offered the ephemeral throne of their country to Duke Peter of Holsten-Gottorp, the heir apparent to the Russian Crown.

Another party at the Russian court, represented by pro-Swedish Count Jean Armand de Lestocq and Peter's Holsteinian relatives, proposed to return Finland to the Swedes in recompense for having his uncle, Adolf Frederick of Holstein-Gottorp, elected as heir to the throne of Sweden. Empress Elizabeth of Russia lent her support to the latter faction, partly because she fondly remembered Adolf Frederick's brother, her projected spouse who had died several months before the wedding could take place (in June 1727).

According to the resultant treaty, Sweden ceded to Russia the areas east of the Kymi River with the fortress of Olofsborg (Olavinlinna) and the towns of Villmanstrand (Lappeenranta) and Fredrikshamn (Hamina). Hence, the Swedish border was moved to the north in accordance with the wishes of Bestuzhev's faction. On the other hand, the Swedes agreed to elect Adolf Frederick as the crown prince. This move exposed the country to the risk of war against Denmark-Norway, hence the Baltic Fleet sailed to Stockholm to protect the Swedish capital in case of Danish attack. The territories were incorporated into the Governorate of Vyborg.

After the treaty, Russia came to control the southern part of Karelia. However, Elizabeth guaranteed religion, properties, laws and privileges of the inhabitants of ceded territories. For example, these territories had just a few years earlier adopted (together with the rest of then-Sweden) the 1734 General Law of Sweden.

== Other sources ==
- (in Russian) Shirokorad A.B. Northern Wars of Russia. Moscow, 2001.
