= The Empress Elizabeth of Russia on Horseback, Attended by a Page =

1743 painting by Georg Christoph Grooth

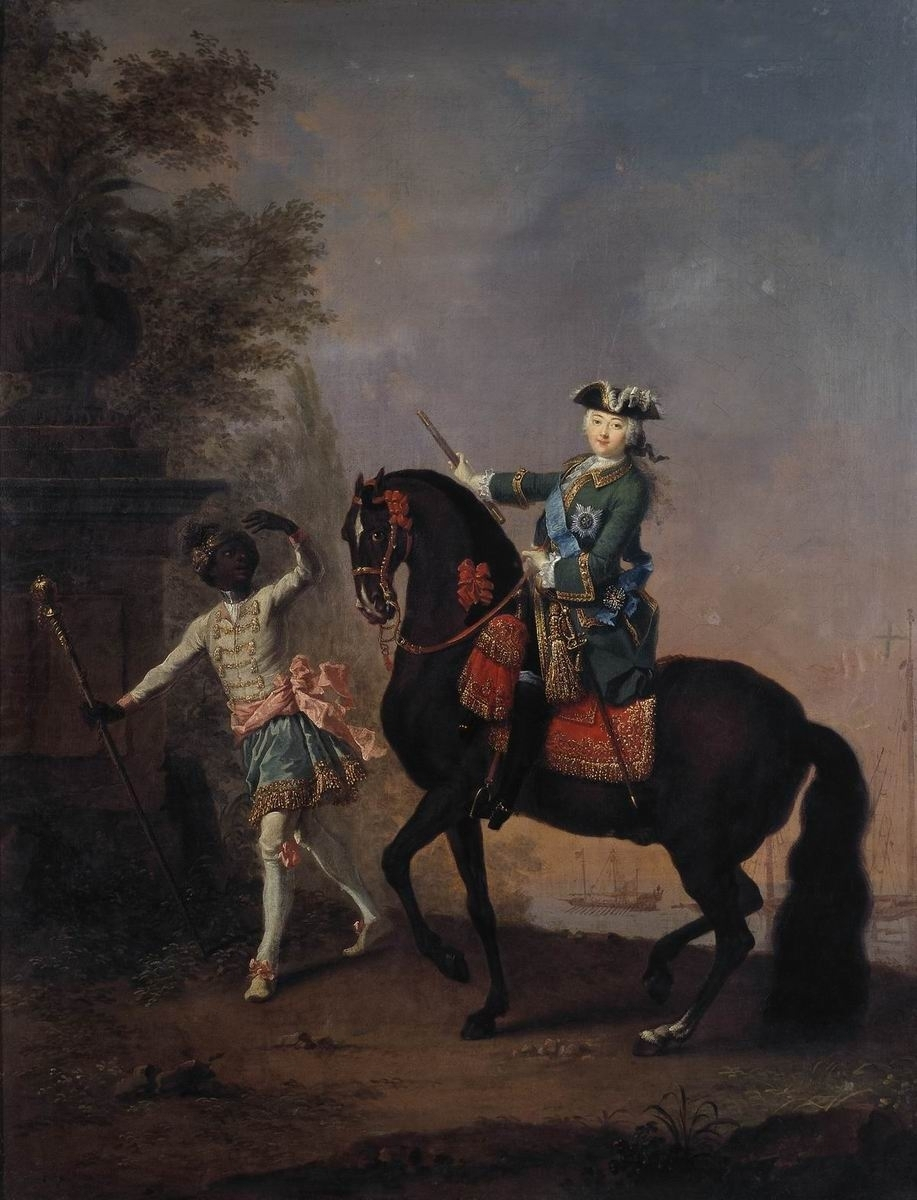
- Artist: Georg Christoph Grooth
- Year: c. 1743
- Medium: Oil on canvas
- Dimensions: 85 cm × 58.5 cm (33 in × 23.0 in)
- Location: Tretyakov Gallery; Moscow

The Empress Elizabeth of Russia on Horseback, Attended by a Page is an equestrian painting of 1743 in the Tretyakov Gallery, Moscow, with several replicas. Done in oil on canvas by Russo-German painter Georg Christoph Grooth, the work depicts Empress Elizabeth of Russia on horseback. The empress is shown dressed in military uniform, attended by a negro page. Elizabeth is shown to be in command of the horse, while her holding of a field marshal's baton represents her command over the sea. The painting was a notable success for Grooth, a former art curator turned painter.

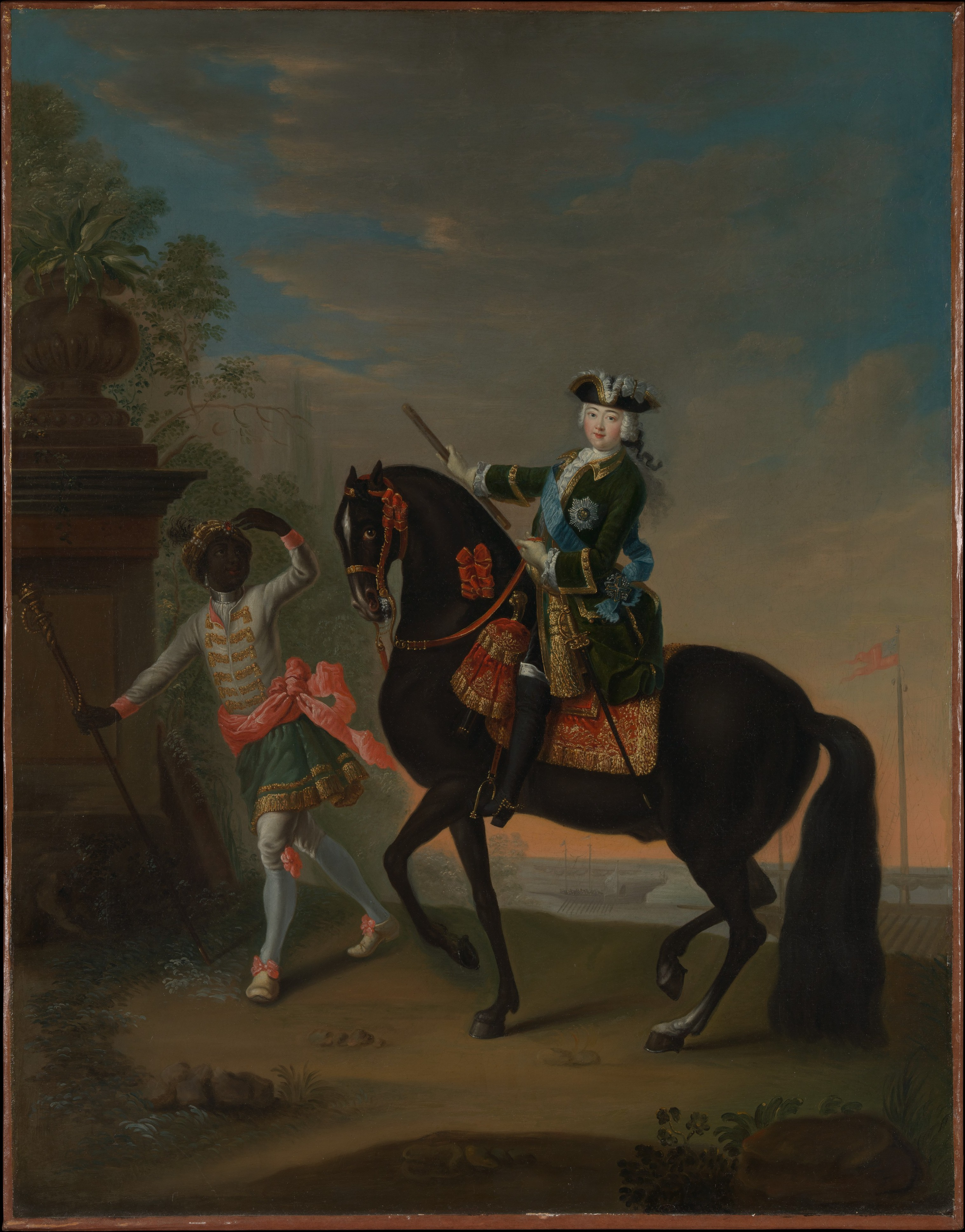
Metropolitan Museum of Art

The version in the collection of the Metropolitan Museum of Art is also attributed to Grooth, dated to the years after 1743.
