= Carl Henrik Wrangel =

Officer of the Swedish Army

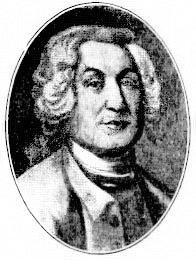
- Carl Henrik Wrangel
- Born: 28 January 1681; Hapsal, Duchy of Estonia
- Died: 23 March 1755 (aged 74); Halmstad in Halland, Sweden
- Occupation: Field marshal of Sweden

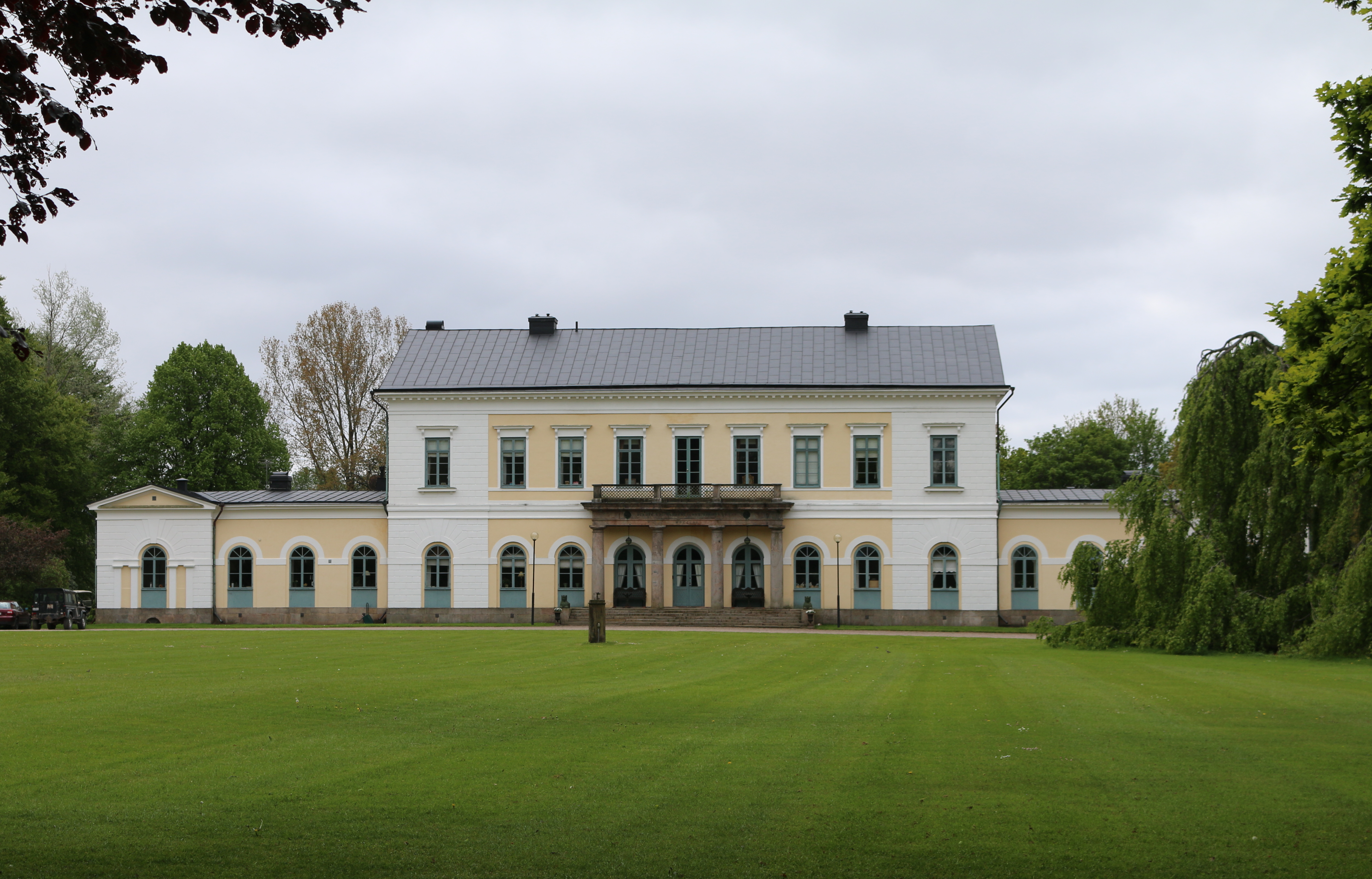
Sperlingsholm at Halmstad in Halland, Sweden

Carl Henrik Wrangel, friherre Wrangel af Adinal (28 January 1681 – 23 March 1755) was an officer of the Swedish Army, attaining the rank of field marshal.

== Biography ==
He was born in Haapsalu in the Duchy of Estonia as the son of Reinhold Wrangel. Wrangel entered military service at the age of 15 and participated in several of the Charles XII's campaigns during the Great Northern War, in the process of which he was promoted to captain of the Svea Life Guards and lieutenant colonel of Skånska ståndsdragonerna, but was captured in 1709 after the Battle of Poltava. After returning from captivity in 1722, he was promoted to colonel of the Nyland cavalry regiment, and in 1727 was made colonel of Tavastehus regiment and in 1729 of Nyland dragoon regiment, in 1732 major-general and in 1739 colonel of the Skaraborg Regiment. The same year, he offered the position of riksråd, but demurred in favour of remaining with the Army.

At the outbreak of the Russo-Swedish War in 1741, he led one of the two divisions of the Swedish Army in Finland, with a strength of 4,000 men. In 1741 at the Battle of Villmanstrand, he was ordered by General Henrik Magnus von Buddenbrock to lead his force into battle against the superior forces of General Peter Lacy. The numerically superior Russians won the battle and took Villmarstrand, whereupon Wrangel, who lost his right arm during the battle, was captured.

Upon his return from captivity in 1742, he received gifts from the king and the burghers of Stockholm and was made lieutenant-general in 1743 and colonel with the Närke-Värmland Regiment. In 1754, he was promoted to field marshal. During the Dalecarlian Rebellion in 1743, he was assigned the task of dissuading or diverting the march of the Dalecarlians on Stockholm, but despite his popularity he achieved neither.

In 1748 he bought the estate Sperlingsholm outside Halmstad where he died in 1755.
