= Monarchy of Finland =

Hypothetical head of state of Finland

Coordinates: 60.1700°N 24.9330°E

The nation of Finland has never been an independent sovereign monarchy; no attempt to establish a fully fledged Finnish monarchy has been successful. When it finally became established as a modern independent nation-state, it was – despite a very brief flirtation with monarchy – in the form of a republic.

The only royalty who are buried in Finland are the wife of King Eric XIV of Sweden, Queen Karin Månsdotter, and her daughter Sigrid of Sweden (1566–1633).

== Early developments ==
There are no records of ancient kings of Finland, but it is possible that various tribal leaders may have held the title of king.

Finland was historically a part of monarchies headquartered outside its own territory. After the 13th century Swedish conquest, Finland became part of the Kingdom of Sweden, nominally as the Duchy of Finland, with some brief feudal characteristics in the 16th century. The elevation of Finland to a Grand Duchy in 1581 had no real effect on Finland's political position.

King Charles IX of Sweden briefly used "King of Finns" (alla finnars konung) as part of his official titulary during 1607–1611, although this had no impact on the official status of Finns or Finland.

== Duke Peter of Holstein-Gottorp ==
In 1742, following the Russian occupation of Finland in the Russo-Swedish War (1741–1743) and vague promises of making the country independent, the four estates gathered in Turku and decided to ask Empress Elizabeth of Russia if the then Duke Peter of Holstein-Gottorp, grand-nephew of the late king Charles XII of Sweden, could be proclaimed as the King of Finland. However, the political situation had soon outgrown the idea of Finnish independence, and it quickly evaporated.

== Autonomous Grand Duchy of Finland ==
Following the capture of Finland from Sweden by Russia in 1809, Finland kept the Swedish constitution formally intact and became an autonomous state, however controlled by the Russian Empire as the Grand Duchy of Finland. The Russian Emperor wielded the powers formerly reserved for the King of Sweden as the Grand Duke of Finland, creatively applying the autocratic Swedish constitution of 1772 and 1789. The first Grand Prince, Alexander I of Russia, was the grandson of Duke Peter of Holstein-Gottorp, who had held the imperial throne for just 6 months in 1762 as Peter III of Russia.

== Monarchy and early independence ==
In December 1917, following the October Revolution, Finland declared its full independence from Russia. The internal unrest in the country soon descended into the Finnish Civil War, an open civil war between the Reds (i.e. revolutionary forces consisting of various socialist factions and the working class) and the Whites (i.e. pro-government forces, political conservatives and much of the middle and upper classes). In the end the White side emerged victorious. During the war, the Whites had been supported by Imperial Germany, and in an effort to cement the alliance with Germany, the Finnish parliament, now purged of socialist members, elected Prince Frederick Charles of Hesse as the King of Finland. Before Frederick Charles could move to Finland, the collapse of the Central Powers made the idea of a German-born Finnish king untenable and he declined the throne. After new elections, the parliament, now again composed of representatives from all political parties, adopted a republican constitution of 1919 which was in effect, with numerous modifications, until 2000 and the basic structure of which is continued in the current Constitution.

== Monarchy today ==
In June 2014 there was a suggestion for reinstituting monarchy by some members of the Finnish National Coalition Party for the party's general assembly. While the proposal failed to garner any meaningful support, it got some national media coverage, which discussed the proposal mostly as a comic relief.
