= Battle of Korpoström =

1743 naval battle in Finland

Sea Battle at Korpoström
- Part of Russo-Swedish War (1741–1743)
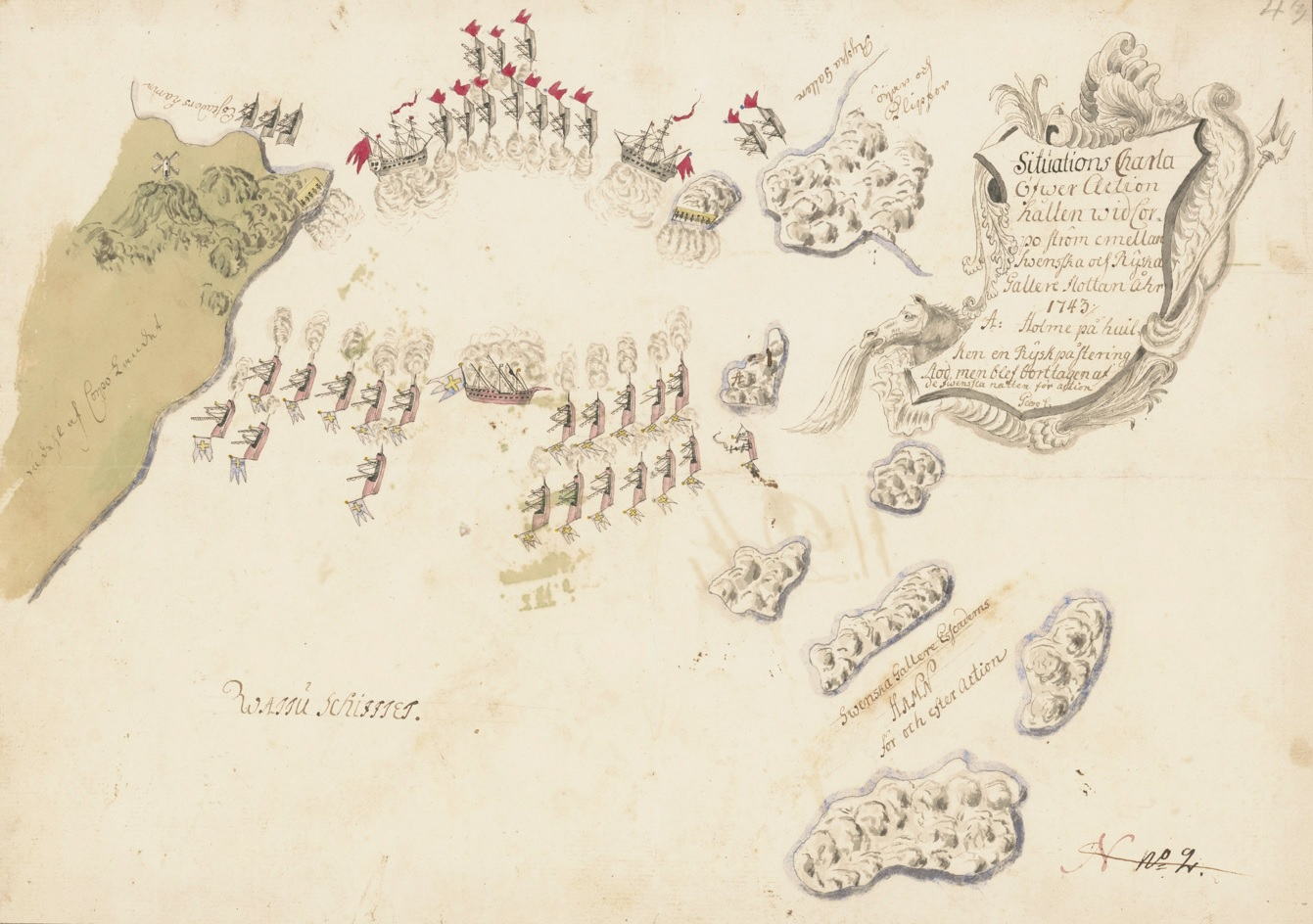
- The Sea Battle at Korpoström, by Cerrg C
Date	May 20, 1743
Location	Korpoström, Finland 60.0°N 22.0°E
Result	Russian victory

Belligerents
Sweden	Russian Empire

Commanders and leaders
Abraham Falkengréen	Yakov Keyt

Strength
31 ships	21 ships

The Battle at Korpoström was a naval engagement that took place during the Russo-Swedish war of 1741–1743. The battle occurred on May 20, 1743, near Korpoström, Finland, and resulted in a decisive Russian victory.

The Swedish fleet, commanded by Abraham Falkengréen, consisted of 31 ships, primarily composed of lightly armed galleys. The Russian forces, led by James Keith, fielded 21 ships, also mainly consisting of lightly armed galleys. Despite having a numerical advantage, the Swedish forces were unable to secure victory in this encounter.
