= Battle of Villmanstrand =

Battle in the Russo-Swedish War of 1741–1743

- Part of the Russo-Swedish War (1741–1743)
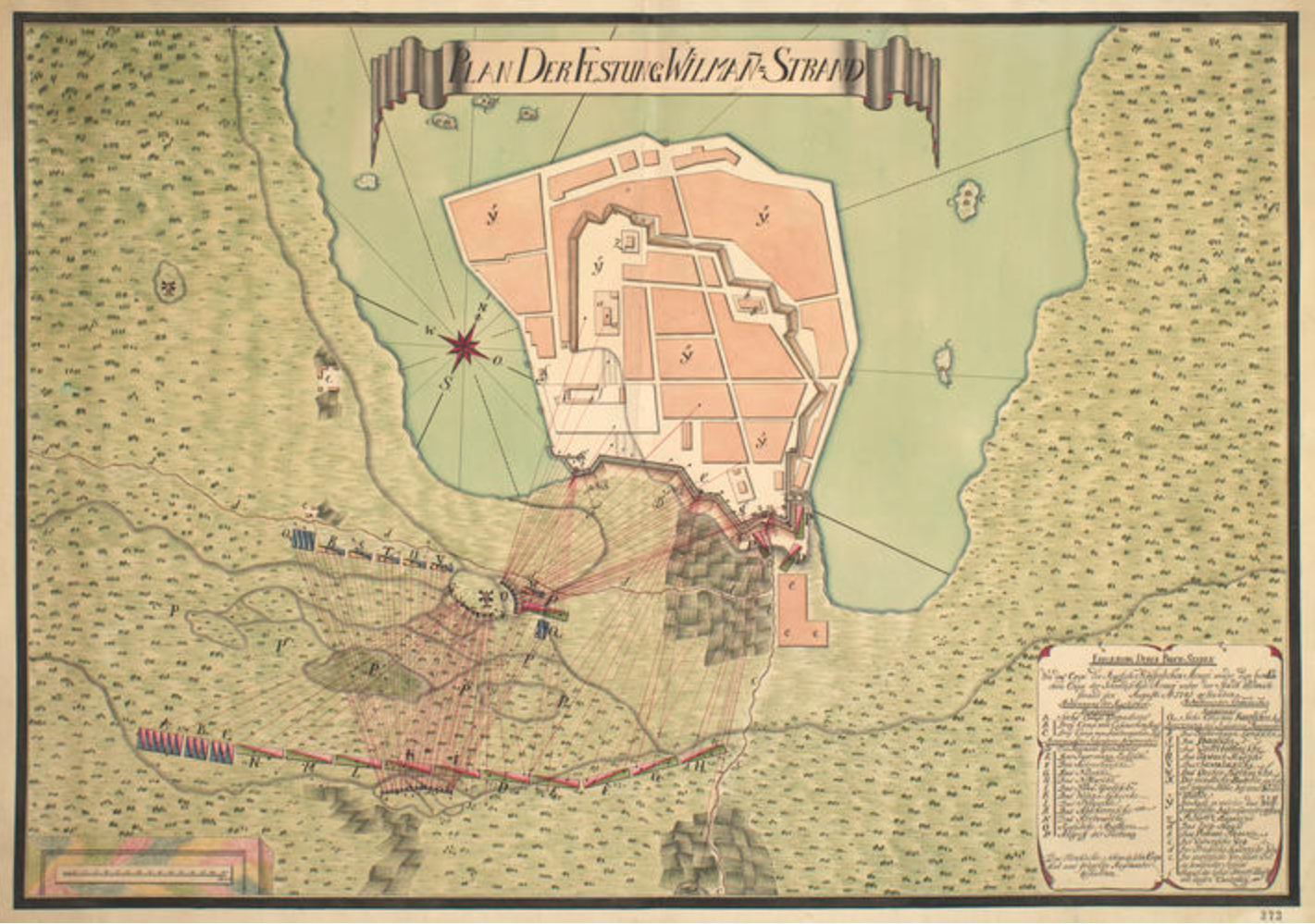
- Map of the battle of Villmanstrand
Date	N.S. 3 September 1741
Location	Villmanstrand, Sweden (present-day Lappeenranta, Finland)
Result	Russian victory

Belligerents
Sweden	Russian Empire

Commanders and leaders
Carl Henrik Wrangel (POW); Ernst Gustaf von Willebrand (POW)	Peter von Lacy; Fyodor Stoffeln; Ivan Bakhmetev

Strength
Swedish estimates: 3,000–4,000 Russian estimates: 5,256–5,600	Russian estimates: 10,000 Swedish estimates: 13,000–18,000

Casualties and losses
Swedish estimates: 2,345; • 1,000 killed or wounded; • 1,345 captured; Russian estimates: 4,637–5,337; • 3,300–4,000 killed or wounded; • 1,337 captured	Russian estimates: 2,385; • 515 killed; • 1,870 wounded

The Battle of Villmanstrand, (Note: Russian: Взятие Вильманстранда) also referred to as the storming of Villmanstrand, was fought during the Russo-Swedish War on 3 September 1741, (Note: O.S. 23 August 1741) when Russian forces of 10,000 men (13,000, or 16,000–18,000, according to Swedish estimates), under the command of General Peter von Lacy, assaulted the fortress of Villmanstrand (Finnish: Lappeenranta).

Lacy drawn up in 2 storming lines: the 1st (grenadier and 4 infantry regiments) was commanded by General Fyodor Stoffeln, the 2nd (5 infantry regiments and all cavalry) by General Ivan Bakhmetev.

Fighting began around 2pm but the Swedes under Carl Henrik Wrangel, counting 3,000–4,000 men (5,256–5,600 according to Russian estimates) withdrew already at 5pm. The Swedes occupied a strong position, protected by the natural landscape, reinforced and fortified. A field combat ensued at the defensive positions near the fortress walls between 2 and 5 pm. The Swedes managed to repel the initial assaults, but were overwhelmed by flanking maneuvers and retreated behind the walls. The Russians sent a drummer to deliver a demand for the fortress's surrender, but he was simply shot in response. Between 5 and 7 pm Lacy's Russians broke into the fortress under the cover of fire from their own and captured cannons. At 7pm the Swedes surrendered.

Swedish casualties amounted to between 2,000 and 2,500 men, or 3,300–4,000 killed and wounded, and 1,337 captured (among them General Carl Henrik Wrangel), with four colours, 12 cannons and one mortar lost according to Russian estimates. Soon after, the Swedes rallied 1,400 men from the Södermanland (300), Dalarna (above 400), Västerbotten (above 300), and Tavastehus (370) regiments (including sick or elsewhere commanded troops not present at the battle). This number does not count the Karelian Dragoons, Savolax Regiment or the Willebrand infantry which were the first Swedish units to flee and thus suffered the least casualties.

The Russians admitted a loss of 515 killed and 1,870 wounded. After the battle, the Swedes claim to have received reports from captured Russian officers stating a loss of 8,000 Russians killed. Von Lacy did not continue his movement after the battle. Henrik Magnus Buddenbrock was executed for his perceived incompetence.

== Swedish units ==
Russian Colonel Christoph Hermann Manstein's estimates of the Swedish strength, reportedly derived from Wrangel's muster roll at the day of the battle. It is unknown if this also includes sick and elsewhere commanded soldiers not present at the battle. Manstein's figures does, however, include the Kymmenegård (Kiminogon) battalion and the second Savolax battalion, neither of which were present at the battle (these are struck through).

- Dalarna Regiment—623 men (311 killed or captured, 44 wounded)
- Södermanland Regiment—681 men
- Västerbotten Regiment—594 men (157 killed or captured)
- Savolax Regiment—~~876 men~~/one battalion (Note: According to Bergenstråhle, the Savolax and Willebrand regiments together had 800 men on the battlefield.)
- Tavastehus Regiment—955 men
- Willebrand Regiment—432 men
- Kymmenegård (Kiminogon) battalion—~~476 men~~/none
- Karelian Dragoons—506 men
- Artillery personnel—113 men

== Sources ==
- Malmström, Carl Gustaf (1863). Sveriges politiska historia: från K. Carl XII: s död till statshvaelfningen 1772, Volume 2 (in Swedish). Stockholm: Hjerta. OCLC 457964593.
- Novitsky, Vasily Fedorovich (1912). Sytin Military Encyclopedia: Volume 6. Верещагин — Воинская повинность. Тип. Т-ва И.Д. Сытина. (in Russian). St. Petersburg: Ivan Sytin.
- Arwidsson, Adolph Ivar (1854). Handlingar till upplysning af Finlands häfder, Volume 7 (in Swedish). Stockholm: Norstedt. OCLC 558098460.
- ten Hoorn, Nicolaas (1744). Maandelyksche berichten uit de andere waerelt; of de spreekende dooden: Bestaande in redeneeringen tusschen allerhande verstorvene potentaten en personagien van rang; zo van den deegen, tabbaart, letteren, als anders .., Volume 46 (in Dutch). Amsterdam: Nicolaas ten Hoorn. OCLC 72721912.
- Manstein, Christoph Hermann (1770). Memoirs of Russia, Historical, Political and Military, from 1727 to 1744. London: Becket and De Hondt. OCLC 246984026.
- Bergenstråhle, Carl Gillis Alexander (1917). Kungl. Västerbottens regementes krigshistoria (in Swedish). Stockholm: P. A. Norstedt och söner. OCLC 465033463.
- Pihlström, Anton; Westerlund, Carl (1910). Kungl. Dalregementets historia: Kungl. Dalregementet under frihetstiden 1722-72. Volume 4 (in Swedish). Stockholm: P. A. Norstedt och söner. OCLC 928729467.
- Paasikivi, Jyrki; Talka, Anu (2018). Rajamaa - Etelä Karjalan Historia I (in Finnish). Keuruu: Otavan Kirjapaino Oy. ISBN 978-951-37-7468-4.
