= Capitulation at Helsingfors =

Russian military campaign in 1742

- Part of Russo-Swedish War (1741–1743)
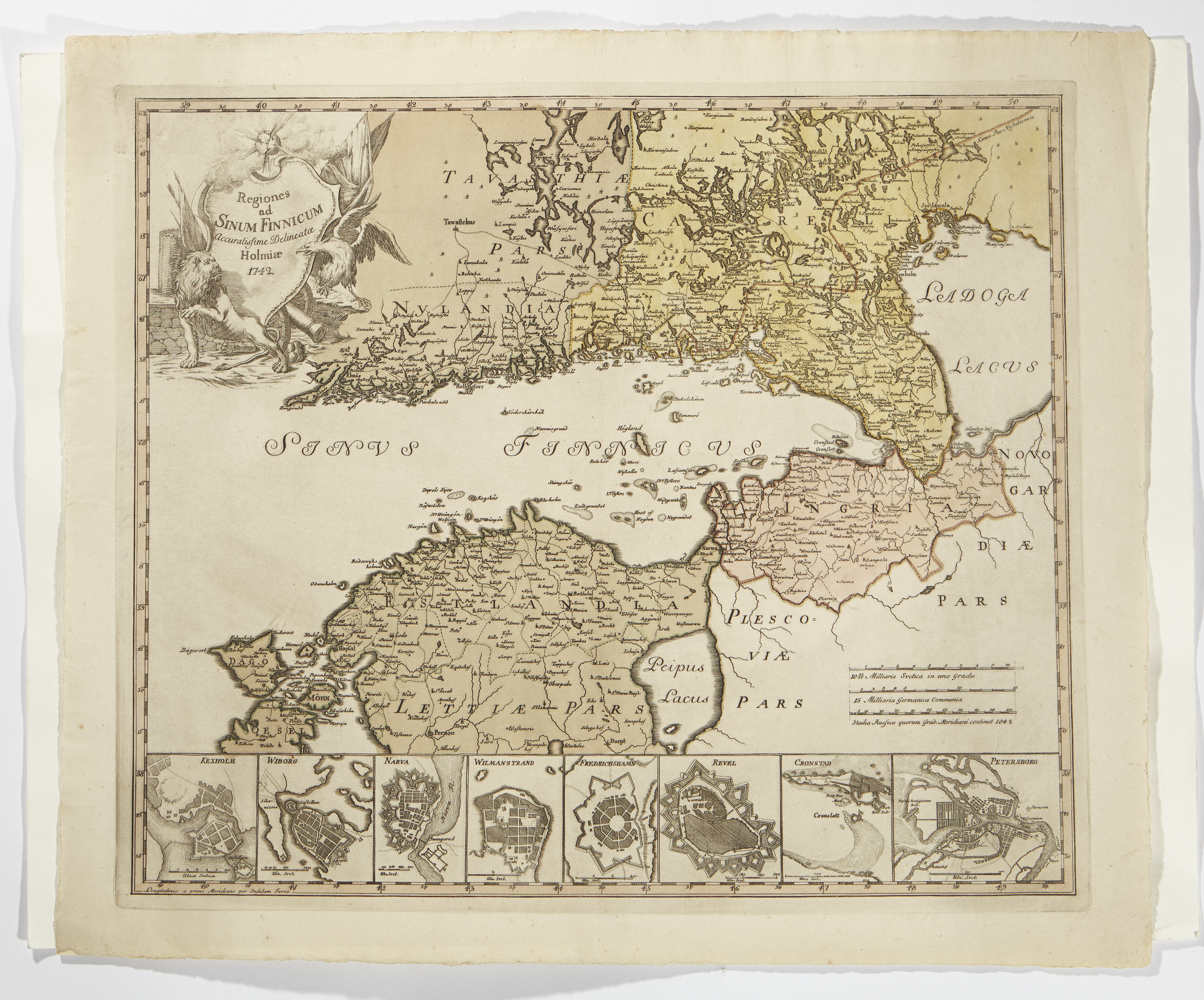
- Map of Gulf of Finland in 1742
Date	12–24 August, 1742
Location	Helsingfors (Helsinki), Finland, Kingdom of Sweden
Result	Russian victory
Territorial changes	Whole of Finland is completely occupied by the Russians

Belligerents
(yes) Sweden	Russia

Commanders and leaders
(Swedish Empire) Charles Lewenhaupt (Swedish Empire) Jean Louis Bousquet (surrendered)	(Russian Empire) Peter Lacy (Russian Empire) James Keith

Strength
17,000	17,500 to 30,000

Casualties and losses
Entire army (Note: The entire army was dispersed, but only Finns 7,000 were captured, the rest returned to Sweden); 90 cannons	Few

The Capitulation at Helsingfors (Note: Russian: Капитуляция у Хельсингфорса; Swedish: Kapitulation vid Helsingfors) was a military campaign in the summer of 1742, during the Russo-Swedish War of 1741–1743, as a result of which the Russians were able to surround and then force the main forces of the Swedish army to capitulate in Helsingfors (Helsinki).

== Background ==
=== Previous events ===
In February 1742, the Russians terminated the previous armistice and again launched an offensive into Finland, the Swedish army made maneuvers, moving away from the battle, first from Fredrikshamn (Hamina), later from Borgå (Porvoo), where it was possible to destroy the Swedish army, but because of the fog, the latter successfully retreated. The losses of the Swedes here are only 106 people, of whom 89 died.

=== The forces of the parties ===
Swedish sources estimate their forces at 12,000, however, this estimate is most likely underestimated. Russian historian Alexei Shkvarov with a full recalculation of the surrendered army noted that in the case of such an estimate, 5,000 simply disappeared, so he estimated its strength at 17,000, which is consistent with other estimates from the Russian side.

Russian army numbers range from 17,500 to 30,000 according to Russian and Swedish estimates, respectively.

== Siege and capitulation ==
On August 11, the Swedes were cut off from a direct escape route, the fleet was considered weak enough, so it retreated without a fight and allowed the siege to be closed. The Swedes planned to put up fierce resistance, but after the news of the fall of Nyslott (Savonlinna), defeatist sentiments began to grow in the army, at the same time Lewenhaupt was recalled to Stockholm, his deputy Bousquet tried to carry out an attack, but the Russians managed to avoid a battle, two day later he capitulated.

== Aftermath ==
After the surrender, most of the scattered troops returned to Sweden, 7,000 Finns surrendered to the Russians and were forced to accept their citizenship, as noted, the Russian cavalry acted almost flawlessly, and the case itself was one of the cleanest victories of the Russia.

== References and notes ==
=== Bibliography ===
- Mattila, Tapani (1983). Meri maamme turvana [Sea safeguarding our country] (in Finnish). Jyväskylä: K. J. Gummerus Osakeyhtiö. ISBN 951-99487-0-8.
- Egorshina, O.; Petrova, A. (2023). История русской армии [The history of the Russian Army] (in Russian). Moscow: Edition of the Russian Imperial Library. ISBN 978-5-699-42397-2.
- Shkvarov, Alexei (2012). Россия и Швеция. История военных конфликтов 1142-1809 [Russia and Sweden. The history of military conflicts 1142-1809] (in Russian). Saint-Petersburg: RME Group Oy:Алетейя. ISBN 978-5-91419-754-1.
- Shpilevskaya, Natalya (1859). Описание войны между Россией и Швецией в Финляндии в 1741, 1742 и 1743 гг. [Description of the war between Russia and Sweden in Finland in 1741, 1742 and 1743.] (in Russian). Saint-Petersburg.
