= Kingdom of Finland =

Failed attempt to establish a monarchy in Finland

Coordinates: 60°10′N 024°56′E

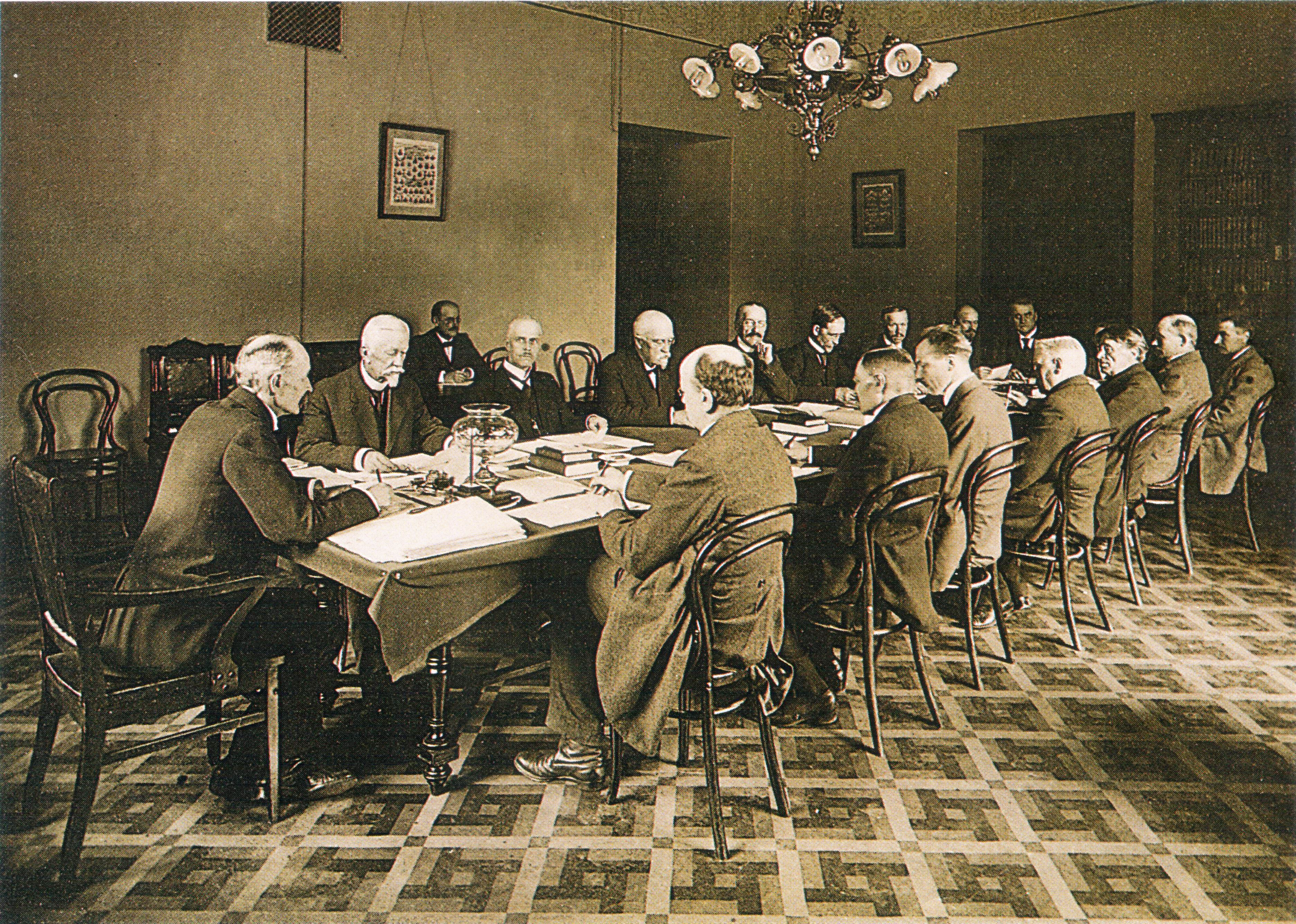
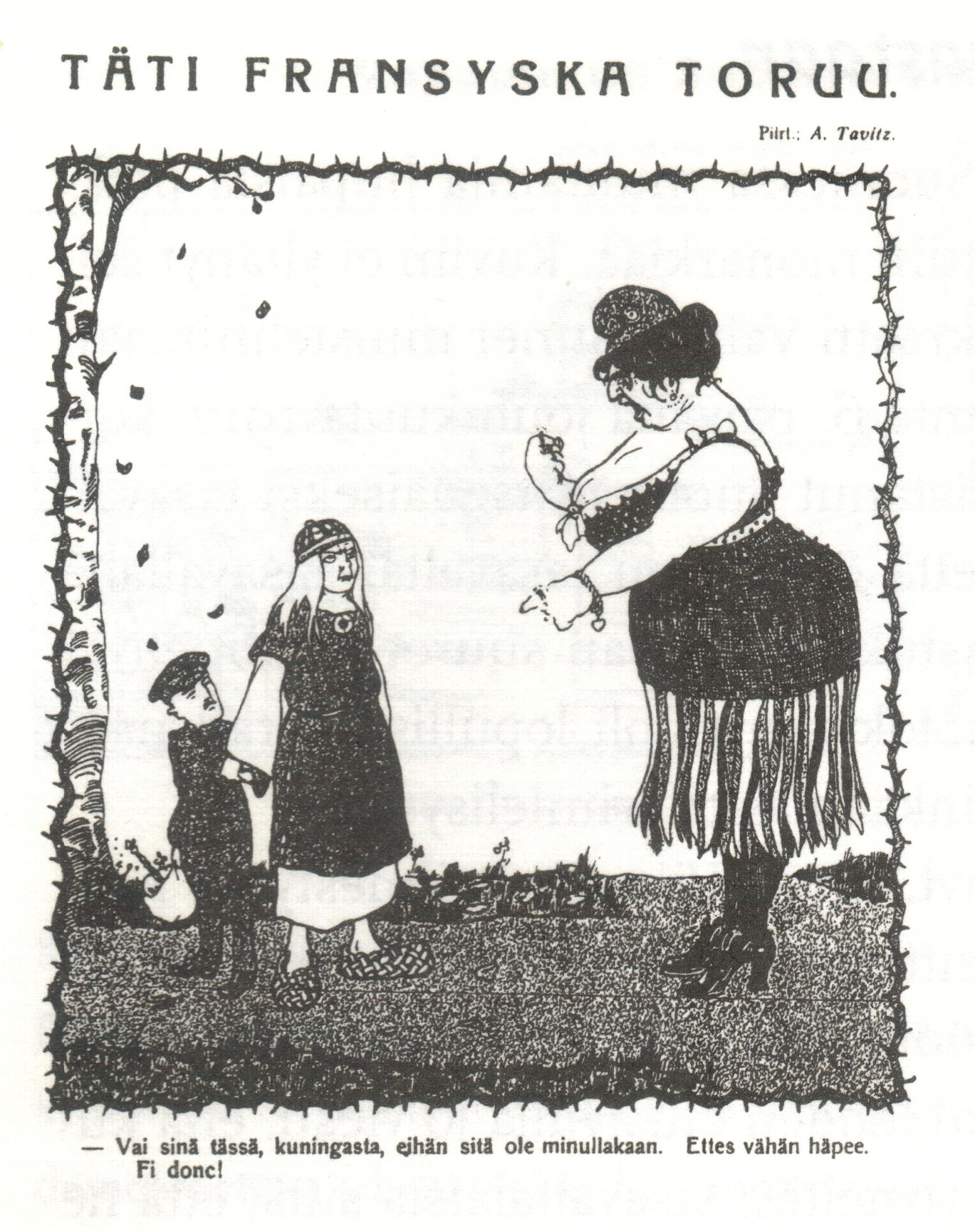
- From top to bottom; left to right: Finnish Constitutional Committee of 1918; State flag of Finland (1918-1920) with a coat of arms as designed by Eric O. W. Ehrström in 1919.; Replica of the king's crown displayed at the Kemi Historical Museum.; Political cartoon titled Täti Fransyska toruu by Alexander Tawitz, published in the Finnish satirical magazine Tuulispää on November 15, 1918. Depicting a caricatured Marianne (in a phrygian cap) scolding the Finnish Maiden for trying to crown the German Prince Frederick Charles of Hesse as King of Finland after World War I.
- Native name: Suomen kuningaskunta
- Date: May 18, 1918 – July 17, 1919
- Location: Finland
- Also known as: Finnish kingdom project
- Type: State formation Interregnum
- Cause: Finnish Declaration of Independence; Finnish Civil War; World War I
- Motive: Securing independence and stability of Finland; Diplomatic alliance with the German Empire; Monarchism in Finland
- Participants: Pehr Evind Svinhufvud; Carl Gustaf Emil Mannerheim; Juho Kusti Paasikivi; Lauri Ingman; Kaarlo Juho Ståhlberg –Leaders of Finland Prince Frederick Charles of Hesse –Elected king of Finland on 9 October 1918); Emperor Wilhelm II
- Outcome: Constitution of 1919 adopted 1919 Presidential and Parliamentary elections held

The Kingdom of Finland (Finnish: Suomen kuningaskunta, Swedish: Konungariket Finland) was a political episode in Finland that attempted to install a monarch for the country. The Finnish Whites looked to establish a new, stable form of government in the aftermath of the Finnish Declaration of Independence in December 1917, and upon the end of the Finnish Civil War in May 1918. The project ultimately failed by 1919, as Finland adopted republicanism in its constitution.

During the Finnish Civil War of 1918, Finnish Reds on friendly terms with Soviet Russia fought Finnish Whites who allied with the German Empire. Direct aid from the German Baltic Sea Division helped the Whites win the war. The victorious Whites in the Parliament of Finland began the process of turning Finland into a kingdom and creating a monarchy. The parliament drew up plans to create a Finnish monarchy on the legal theory that the Swedish Constitution of 1772 was still in effect, but there had been an extended interregnum with no monarch on the throne. Prince Friedrich Karl of Hesse was elected to the throne of Finland on 9 October 1918 by the Finnish parliament, but he never took the position nor traveled to Finland. Soon after the election, Finnish leaders as well as the population belatedly came to understand the grave situation their German allies were in, and the wisdom of electing a German prince as monarch as Germany was about to lose World War I was called into question. Germany itself became a republic, deposed Kaiser Wilhelm II and signed an armistice with the Allies in November. The victorious powers informed the Finnish government that the independence of Finland would only be recognized if it abandoned its alliance with Germany. As a result, Friedrich Karl renounced the throne in December and the Baltic Sea Division withdrew from Finland. In the March 1919 election, with the Finnish left and socialists able to vote, republicans won a crushing victory. Finland's status as a republic was confirmed in the Finnish Constitution of 1919.

== History ==
Finland declared independence from the Russian Empire on 6 December 1917, during the Russian Civil War. While a minority of Members of Parliament (MPs) were inclined towards monarchy, this issue was deferred in favor of achieving national sovereignty as quickly as possible, and the Parliament unanimously declared Finland a republic.

The declaration of independence was followed by the Finnish Civil War (January–May 1918). The war was a brutal conflict between the socialist Reds and the conservative, non-socialist Whites. The victorious Whites subsequently excluded the Social Democratic Party from the Parliament, with the exception of a single representative, Matti Paasivuori. Before the Civil War, the social democrats had held 92 out of 200 seats in the Parliament, and this exclusion radically altered the political balance. The monarchists now began to question the initial declaration of Finland as a republic, arguing that the Civil War had demonstrated the inherent instability of an unconstrained, democratically elected Parliament. They contended that the new nation needed a king who would stand above factional disputes and guarantee the continuity and order of the state.

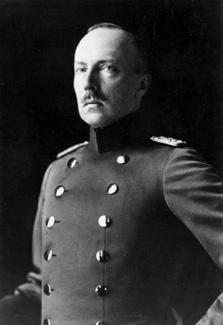
Prince Friedrich Karl of Hesse, the king-elect of Finland

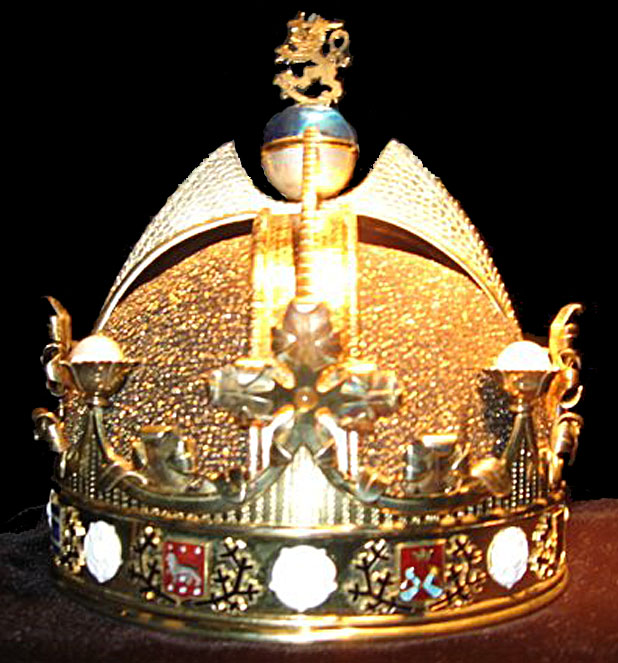
Replica of the Crown designed for the Finnish monarch. The actual crown was never crafted; however, this replica was made from original drawings in the 1980s.

Lithuania had already taken a similar step in July 1918, electing Wilhelm Karl, Duke of Urach and Count of Württemberg, as King Mindaugas II of Lithuania. In Latvia and Estonia, a "General Provincial Assembly" consisting of Baltic-German aristocrats had called upon the German Emperor, Wilhelm II, to recognize the Baltic provinces as a joint monarchy and a German protectorate. Adolf Friedrich, Duke of Mecklenburg-Schwerin, was nominated Duke of "the United Baltic Duchy" by the Germans.

There were several candidates for the post of King of Finland in the spring and summer of 1918. Oskar, the second youngest son of German Kaiser Wilhelm II, was primarily hoped to be king, as he would have created a strong connection between Finland and the German royal houses and thus guaranteed Germany's support for Finland during a possible crisis. Von der Goltz encouraged the Finns to pursue a ruler belonging to the Hohenzollern family, but on the recommendation of his Ministry of Foreign Affairs, Kaiser Wilhelm was reluctant to give Oscar or any other Hohenzollern family to Finland, which was still considered an unstable state. Regent Svinhufvud visited the Emperor on 26 August to persuade him to accept Oskar's candidacy, with little success. Oskar's kingship was also supported at an early stage by Germany's chief quartermaster, General Erich Ludendorff.

The most active candidate in the royal debates was Duke Adolf Friedrich of Mecklenburg, former governor of Togo. He was strongly supported by, among others, Edvard Hjelt, who was Finland's diplomatic representative in Berlin, and his assistant Rafael Erich. Adolf Friedrich was also recommended by some foreign kings. However, Adolf Friedrich's credibility was undermined at the beginning of July by the overzealous and open lobbying of his representatives and active opponents. On 28 August, the newspapers reported that he had withdrawn his candidacy for good. At the suggestion of the Germans, the Senate also considered Prince Friedrich Wilhelm of Prussia, whom at least Svinhufvud and Paasikivi considered to be the next best option. However, the emperor also opposed his election, in addition to which Friedrich Wilhelm's problems were the lack of male heirs and a Roman Catholic spouse, which was opposed especially by the Finnish clergy.

Even the marshals of the German headquarters, Paul von Hindenburg and August von Mackensen, as well as General Ludendorff, were mentioned in passing as possible candidates for king. Candidates from Scandinavia were also considered: Prince Wilhelm, the second son of King Gustav V of Sweden, and his school-age son Prince Lennart were offered to the Finns, as well as Prince Aage, Count of Rosenberg. In Finland, however, a Nordic and especially Swedish ruler was considered an impossible option, as it would have been feared that this would favour Swedish speakers, Sweden was unpopular in Finland due to the dispute over the Åland Islands, and in addition, the Finnish monarchists did not want a weak monarch like the Scandinavian countries.The possibility of a Finnish-born king was practically not considered at all.

At independence, Finland, like the Baltic provinces, had close ties with the German Empire. Germany was the only international power that had supported the preparations for independence, not least by training volunteers as Finnish Jäger troops. Germany had also intervened in the Finnish Civil War, despite its own precarious situation. Finland's position vis-a-vis Germany was already evolving towards that of a protectorate by spring 1918, and the election of Prince Frederick, brother-in-law of Wilhelm II, was viewed as a confirmation of the close relations between the two nations. The strongly pro-German prime minister, Juho Kusti Paasikivi, and his government offered the crown to Prince Frederick in October 1918, while Pehr Evind Svinhufvud was declared Regent.

The adoption of a new monarchist constitution had been delayed because it did not get the required qualified majority. The legitimacy of the royal election was based upon the Instrument of Government of 1772, adopted under King Gustav III of Sweden, when Finland had been a part of the Kingdom of Sweden. The same constitutional document had also served as the basis for the rule of the Russian Emperors, as Grand Dukes of Finland, during the 19th century.

Member of parliament Gustaf Arokallio suggested the monarchical designation "Karl I, King of Finland and Karelia, Duke of Åland, Grand Duke of Lapland, Lord of Kaleva and the North" (Finnish: Kaarle I, Suomen ja Karjalan kuningas, Ahvenanmaan herttua, Lapinmaan suuriruhtinas, Kalevan ja Pohjolan isäntä; Swedish: Karl I, Kung av Finland och Karelen, hertig av Åland, storhertig av Lappland, herre över Kaleva och Pohjola).

By 9 November 1918 the German Emperor Wilhelm II had abdicated and Germany was declared a republic. Two days later, on 11 November 1918, the armistice between the belligerents of World War I was signed. Little is known of the Allied powers' view regarding the possibility of a German-born prince as the King of Finland. However, warnings received from the West convinced the Finnish government of Prime Minister Lauri Ingman – a monarchist himself – to ask Prince Friedrich Karl to give up the crown, which he had not yet come to wear in Finland.

The king-elect Friedrich Karl renounced the throne on 14 December 1918. Svinhufvud resigned and Lieutenant General Carl Gustaf Mannerheim, the leader of the Whites during the Finnish Civil War, was appointed as Regent of Finland. Republican parties won three-quarters of the parliament's seats in the election of 1919 and Finland adopted a republican constitution. In July 1919, Finland's first president Kaarlo Juho Ståhlberg replaced Mannerheim as the first President of the Republic.

== See also ==
- Empress Elizabeth's Manifesto of 1742
- Finnish crown jewels
- House of Hesse
- Monarchy of Finland
- Prince Wolfgang of Hesse
- United Baltic Duchy

== Sources ==
- Nash, Michael L (2012). "The Last King of Finland." Royalty Digest Quarterly, 2012:1.
