= Style of the Swedish sovereign =

Formal mode of address of the monarch of Sweden

The style of the Swedish sovereign is the formal mode of address used by the reigning monarch of Sweden. Its precise form has changed over the years, by either geopolitical change or replacement of ruling house.

== Styles and titles ==
This list only include monarchs subsequent to the reign of Gustav I in the 16th century, specifically since 1523 when he was elected king and the House of Vasa came to rule Sweden. During the 12th and 13th century, most kings were styled "King of the Swedes" until the age of Magnus Eriksson.

=== House of Vasa ===
| Monarch | Period | Style in Swedish | English translation |
|---|---|---|---|
| Gustav I (1496–1560) | 1521–1523 | Jag Gustav Eriksson i Rydboholm utvald Hövitsman över Dalarna, Hälsingland, Gästrikland, Östragötaland och Uppland | I Gustav Eriksson in Rydboholm, elected Headman of Dalarna, Hälsingland, Gästrikland, Östragötaland and Uppland (Note: An early example of the style of Gustav I as regent follows: Headman of Kopparberg, Silvberg, Järnberg and the general Dalarna, Hälsingland, Gästrikland, Norrland and of all Rumboland (Swedish: Hövitsman över Kopparberg, Silvberg, Järnberg och menige Dalarna, Hälsingland, Gästrikland, Norrland och allt Rumboland).) |
| Gustav I (1496–1560) | 1523–1528 | Vi Gustav, med Guds Nåde, utvald Sveriges och Götes konung | We Gustav, by the Grace of God, elected King of Sweden and of the Goths |
| Gustav I (1496–1560) | 1528–1560 | Vi Gustav, med Guds Nåde, Sveriges, Götes och Vendes konung | We Gustav, by the Grace of God, King of Sweden, the Goths and the Wends |
| Eric XIV (1533–1577) | 1560–1568 | Vi Erik XIV, med Guds Nåde, Sveriges, Götes och Vendes konung | We Eric XIV, by the Grace of God, King of Sweden, the Goths and the Wends |
| John III (1537–1592) | 1568–1581 | Vi Johan III, med Guds Nåde, Sveriges, Götes och Vendes konung, storfurste till Finland, till Karelen, Votskij pätin och Ingermanland i Ryssland samt över de Ester i Livland hertig | We John III, by the Grace of God, King of Sweden, the Goths and the Wends, Grand Prince of Finland, Duke of Karelia, the Pyatina of the Wods, of Ingria in Russia and of the Estonians of Livonia |
| John III (1537–1592) | 1581–1583 | Vi Johan III, med Guds Nåde, Sveriges, Götes och Vendes konung, storfurste till Finland, av Karelen, Sjelonskij pätin och Ingermanland i Ryssland samt över de Ester i Livland hertig | We John III, by the Grace of God, King of Sweden, the Goths and the Wends, Grand Prince of Finland, Duke of Karelia, the Pyatina of Shelon, of Ingria in Russia and of the Estonians of Livonia |
| John III (1537–1592) | 1583–1592 | Vi Johan III, med Guds Nåde, Sveriges, Götes och Vendes konung, storfurste till Finland, till Karelen, Votskij pätin och Ingermanland i Ryssland samt över de Ester i Livland hertig | We John III, by the Grace of God, King of Sweden, the Goths and the Wends, Grand Prince of Finland, Duke of Karelia, the Pyatina of the Wods, of Ingria in Russia and of the Estonians of Livonia |
| Sigismund (1566–1632) | 1592–1599 | Vi Sigismund, med Guds Nåde, Sveriges, Götes och Vendes konung, storfurste till Finland, till Karelen, Votskij pätin och Ingermanland i Ryssland samt över de Ester i Livland hertig; så ock konung till Polen, storfurste till Litauen, till Ryssland, Preussen, Masovien, Samogitien, Kiev, Volynien och Livland herre | We Sigismund, by the Grace of God, King of Sweden, the Goths and the Wends, Grand Prince of Finland, Duke of Karelia, the Pyatina of the Wods, Ingria in Russia and of the Estonians of Livonia; King of Poland, Grand Duke of Lithuania, Lord of Ruthenia, Prussia, Mazovia, Samogitia, Kiev, Volhinia and Livonia |
| Charles IX (1550–1611) | 1599–1604 | Vi Karl, med Guds Nåde, Sveriges rikes regerande arvfurste, hertig till Södermanland, Närke och Värmland | We Charles, by the Grace of God, reigning Hereditary Prince of Sweden, Duke of Södermanland, Närke and Värmland |
| Charles IX (1550–1611) | 1604–1607 | Vi Karl, med Guds Nåde, Sveriges rikes utkorade konung och arvfurste, hertig till Södermanland, Närke och Värmland | We Charles, by the Grace of God, chosen King of the Swedish Realm and Hereditary Prince, Duke of Södermanland, Närke and Värmland |
| Charles IX (1550–1611) | 1607–1611 | Vi Karl IX, med Guds Nåde, Sveriges, Götes, Vendes, Finnars, Karelers, de Lapparna i Norrlands, Kajaners och de Ester i Livlands konung | We Charles IX, by the Grace of God, King of Sweden, the Goths, the Wends, the Finns, the Karelians, of the Lapps of the Northern Lands, of the Kajanas and of the Estonians of Livonia |
| Gustavus Adolphus (1594–1632) | 1611–1617 | Vi Gustav Adolf, med Guds Nåde, Sveriges, Götes och Vendes utkorade konung och arvfurste, storfurste till Finland, hertig till Estland och Västmanland | We Gustavus Adolphus, by the Grace of God, chosen King and heir of Sweden, the Goths and the Wends, Grand Prince of Finland, Duke of Estonia and Västmanland |
| Gustavus Adolphus (1594–1632) | 1617–1632 | Vi Gustav Adolf, med Guds Nåde, Sveriges, Götes och Vendes konung, storfurste till Finland, hertig uti Estland och Karelen, herre över Ingermanland | We Gustavus Adolphus, by the Grace of God, King of Sweden, the Goths, the Wends, Grand Prince of Finland, Duke of Estonia and Karelia, Lord of Ingria |
| Christina (1626–1689) | 1632–1650 | Vi Kristina, med Guds Nåde, Sveriges, Götes och Vendes drottning, storfurstinna till Finland, hertiginna uti Estland och Karelen, fru över Ingermanland | We Christina, by the Grace of God, Queen of Sweden, the Goths and the Wends, Grand Princess of Finland, Duchess of Estonia and Karelia, Lady of Ingria |
| Christina (1626–1689) | 1650–1654 | Vi Kristina, med Guds Nåde, Sveriges, Götes och Vendes drottning, storfurstinna till Finland, hertiginna uti Estland, Karelen, Bremen, Verden, Stettin-Pommern, Kassuben och Wenden, furstinna till Rügen, fru över Ingermanland och Wismar | We Christina, by the Grace of God, Queen of Sweden, the Goths and the Wends, Grand Princess of Finland, Duchess of Estonia, Karelia, Bremen, Verden, Stettin-Pomerania, Kashubia and of Wenden, Princess of Rügen, Lady of Ingria and Wismar |

=== House of Palatinate-Zweibrücken ===
| Monarch | Period | Style in Swedish | English translation |
|---|---|---|---|
| Charles X Gustav (1622–1660) | 1654–1658 | Vi Karl Gustav, med Guds Nåde, Sveriges, Götes och Vendes konung, storfurste till Finland, hertig uti Estland, Karelen, Bremen, Verden, Stettin-Pommern, Kassuben och Wenden, furste till Rügen, herre över Ingermanland och Wismar; så och pfalzgeve vid Rhen, i Bayern, Jülich, Kleve och Berg hertig | We Charles Gustav, by the Grace of God, King of Sweden, the Goths and the Wends, Grand Prince of Finland, Duke of Estonia, Karelia, Bremen, Verden, Stettin-Pomerania, Kashubia and of Wenden, Prince of Rügen, Lord of Ingria and Wismar; Count Palatine of the Rhine, Duke in Bavaria, of Jülich, Cleves and Berg |
| Charles X Gustav (1622–1660) | 1658–1660 | Vi Karl Gustav, med Guds Nåde, Sveriges, Götes och Vendes konung, storfurste till Finland, hertig uti Skåne, Estland, Livland, Karelen, Bremen, Verden, Stettin-Pommern, Kassuben och Wenden, furste till Rügen, herre över Ingermanland och Wismar; så och pfalzgeve vid Rhen, i Bayern, Jülich, Kleve och Berg hertig | We Charles Gustav, by the Grace of God, King of Sweden, the Goths and the Wends, Grand Prince of Finland, Duke of Scania, Estonia, Livonia, Karelia, Bremen, Verden, Stettin-Pomerania, Kashubia and Wenden, Prince of Rügen, Lord of Ingria and Wismar; Count Palatine of the Rhine, Duke in Bavaria, of Jülich, Cleves and Berg |
| Charles XI (1655–1697) | 1660–1697 | Vi Karl, av Guds Nåde, Sveriges, Götes och Vendes konung, storfurste till Finland, hertig uti Skåne, Estland, Livland, Karelen, Bremen, Verden, Stettin-Pommern, Kassuben och Wenden, furste till Rügen, herre över Ingermanland och Wismar; så och pfalzgeve vid Rhen, i Bayern, Jülich, Kleve och Berg hertig | We Charles, by the Grace of God, King of Sweden, the Goths and the Wends, Grand Prince of Finland, Duke of Scania, Estonia, Livonia, Karelia, Bremen, Verden, Stettin-Pomerania, Kashubia and of Wenden, Prince of Rügen, Lord of Ingria and Wismar; Count Palatine of the Rhine, Duke in Bavaria, of Jülich, Cleves and Berg |
| Charles XII (1682–1718) | 1697–1718 | Vi Karl, av Guds Nåde, Sveriges, Götes och Vendes konung, storfurste till Finland, hertig uti Skåne, Estland, Livland, Karelen, Bremen, Verden, Stettin-Pommern, Kassuben och Wenden, furste till Rügen, herre över Ingermanland och Wismar; så och pfalzgreve vid Rhen, i Bayern, samt till Jülich, Kleve och Berg hertig | We Charles, by the Grace of God, King of Sweden, the Goths and the Wends, Grand Prince of Finland, Duke of Scania, Estonia, Livonia, Karelia, Bremen, Verden, Stettin-Pomerania, of Kashubia and of Wenden, Prince of Rügen, Lord of Ingria and Wismar; Count Palatine of the Rhine, Duke in Bavaria, of Jülich, Cleves and Berg |
| Ulrica Eleanor (1688–1741) | 1718–1720 | Vi Ulrika Eleonora, av Guds Nåde, Sveriges, Götes och Vendes drottning, storfurstinna till Finland, hertiginna uti Skåne, Estland, Livland, Karelen, Bremen, Verden, Stettin-Pommern, Kassuben och Venden, furste till Rügen, fru över Ingermanland och Wismar; så och pfalzgrevinna vid Rhen, i Bayern, samt till Jülich, Kleve och Berg hertiginna. Grevinna till Valdens, Sponheim, Mark och Ravensburg, fru till Ravenstein; lantgrevinna och arvprinsessa till Hessen, furstinna till Hersfeld, grevinna till Katzenelnbogen, Diez, Ziegenhain, Nidda och Schaumburg | We Ulrica Eleanor, by the Grace of God, Queen of Sweden, the Goths and the Wends, Grand Princess of Finland, Duchess of Scania, Estonia, Livonia, Karelia, Bremen, Verden, Stettin-Pomerania, Kashubia and of Wenden, Princess of Rügen, Lady of Ingria and Wismar; Countess Palatine of the Rhine, Duchess in Bavaria, of Jülich, Cleves and Berg; Landgravine and Hereditary Princess of Hesse, Princess of Hersfeld, Countess of Katzenelnbogen, Diez, Ziegenhain, Nidda and Schaumburg |

=== House of Hesse-Kassel ===
| Monarch | Period | Style in Swedish | English translation |
|---|---|---|---|
| Frederick I (1676–1751) | 1720–1751 | Vi Fredrik, med Guds Nåde, Sveriges, Götes och Vendes konung; lantgreve till Hessen, furste till Hersfeld, greve till Katzenelnbogen, Diez, Ziegenhain, Nidda och Schaumburg | We Frederick, by the Grace of God, King of Sweden, the Goths and the Wends; Landgrave of Hesse, Prince of Hersfeld, Count of Katzenelnbogen, Diez, Ziegenhain, Nidda and Schaumburg |

=== House of Holstein-Gottorp ===
| Monarch | Period | Style in Swedish | English translation |
|---|---|---|---|
| Adolph Frederick (1710–1771) | 1751–1771 | Vi Adolf Fredrik, med Guds Nåde, Sveriges, Götes och Vendes konung; arvinge till Norge, hertig till Schleswig, Holstein, Srormarn, Dithmarschen, greve till Oldenburg och Delmenhorst | We Adolph Frederick, by the Grace of God, King of Sweden, the Goths and the Wends; Heir to Norway, Duke of Schleswig, Holstein, Stormarn, Dithmarschen, Count of Oldenburg and Delmenhorst |
| Gustav III (1746–1792) | 1771–1792 | Vi Gustav, med Guds Nåde, Sveriges, Götes och Vendes konung; arvinge till Norge, hertig till Schleswig, Holstein, Srormaren, Dithmarschen, greve till Oldenburg och Delmenhorst | We Gustav, by the Grace of God, King of Sweden, the Goths and the Wends; Heir to Norway, Duke of Schleswig, Holstein, Stormarn, Dithmarschen, Count of Oldenburg and Delmenhorstin |
| Gustav IV Adolph (1778–1837) | 1792–1809 | Vi Gustav Adolf, med Guds Nåde, Sveriges, Götes och Vendes konung; arvinge till Danmark och Norge, hertig till Schleswig, Holstein, Stormarn, Dithmarschen, greve till Oldenburg och Delmenhorst | We Gustav Adolph, by the Grace of God, King of Sweden, the Goths and the Wends; Heir to Denmark and Norway, Duke of Schleswig, Holstein, Stormarn, Dithmarschen, Count of Oldenburg and Delmenhorst |
| Charles XIII (1748–1818) | 1792–1796 | Vi Karl, med Guds Nåde, Sveriges, Götes och Vendes arvfurste och riksföreståndare, hertig till Södermanland; arvinge till Norge, hertig till Schleswig, Holstein, Srormaren, Dithmarschen, greve till Oldenburg och Delmenhorst. Svea rikes storamiral | We Charles, by the Grace of God, Hereditary Prince and Regent of Sweden, the Goths and the Wends, Duke of Södermanland; Heir to Norway, Duke of Schleswig, Holstein, Stormarn, Dithmarschen, Count of Oldenburg and Delmenhorst. Grand Admiral of the Swedish Realm |
| Charles XIII (1748–1818) | 1809–1814 | Vi Karl, med Guds Nåde, Sveriges, Götes och Vendes konung, hertig till Södermanland; arvinge till Norge, hertig till Schleswig, Holstein, Srormarn, Dithmarschen, greve till Oldenburg och Delmenhorst | We Charles, by the Grace of God, King of Sweden, the Goths and the Wends; Heir to Norway, Duke of Schleswig, Holstein, Stormarn and Dithmarschen, Count of Oldenburg and Delmenhorst |
| Charles XIII (1748–1818) | 1814–1818 | Vi Carl, med Guds Nåde, Sveriges, Norges, Götes och Vendes konung; hertig till Schleswig, Holstein, Stormarn, Dithmarschen, greve till Oldenburg och Delmenhorst | We Charles, by the Grace of God, King of Sweden, Norway, the Goths and the Wends; Duke of Schleswig, Holstein, Stormarn and Dithmarschen, Count of Oldenburg and Delmenhorst |

=== House of Bernadotte ===
| Monarch | Period | Style in Swedish | English translation |
|---|---|---|---|
| Charles XIV John (1763–1844) | 1818–1844 | Vi Karl Johan, med Guds Nåde, Sveriges, Norges, Götes och Vendes konung | We Charles John, by the Grace of God, King of Sweden, Norway, the Goths and the Wends |
| Oscar I (1799–1859) | 1844–1859 | Vi Oscar, med Guds Nåde, Sveriges, Norges, Götes och Vendes konung | We Oscar, by the Grace of God, King of Sweden, Norway, the Goths and the Wends |
| Charles XV (1826–1872) | 1859–1872 | Vi Karl, med Guds Nåde, Sveriges, Norges, Götes och Vendes konung | We Charles, by the Grace of God, King of Sweden, Norway, the Goths and the Wends |
| Oscar II (1829–1907) | 1872–1905 | Vi Oscar, med Guds Nåde, Sveriges, Norges, Götes och Vendes konung | We Oscar, by the Grace of God, King of Sweden, Norway, the Goths and the Wends |
| Oscar II (1829–1907) | 1905–1907 | Vi Oscar, med Guds Nåde, Sveriges, Götes och Vendes konung | We Oscar, by the Grace of God, King of Sweden, the Goths and the Wends |
| Gustaf V (1858–1950) | 1907–1950 | Vi Gustaf, med Guds Nåde, Sveriges, Götes och Vendes konung | We Gustaf, by the Grace of God, King of Sweden, the Goths and the Wends |
| Gustaf VI Adolf (1882–1973) | 1950–1973 | Vi Gustaf Adolf, med Guds Nåde, Sveriges, Götes och Vendes konung | We Gustaf Adolf, by the Grace of God, King of Sweden, the Goths and the Wends |
| Carl XVI Gustaf (born 1946) | 1973–present | Vi Carl Gustaf, Sveriges konung | We Carl Gustaf, King of Sweden |

== See also ==
- Royal mottos of Swedish monarchs
- King of the Wends
- King of the Goths
