= Savolax Infantry Regiment =

Savolax Infantry Regiment

The Savolax Infantry Regiment (Swedish: Savolax infanteriregemente) was an infantry musketeer regiment in the Swedish Army, in the province of Savolax (Savonia). The regiment was created in 1626 as the Savolax and Nyslotts Land Regiment. It was allotted regiment in 1695. The regiment contained musketeer and grenadier units.

== History ==
The Savolax Infantry Regiment was created in 1626 as the Savolax and Nyslotts Land Regiment. (Swedish: Savolax regemente) It was created as part of the Swedish Allotment System. In 1634, Savolax Regiment was ranked 14th amongst the Swedish infantry regiments by a Swedish government regulation. The regiment's origins go back to the Gustav Horn's regiment.

== Uniform ==
Standard Uniform
Headgear: Musketeer: Black tricorne with white lacing and a tin button on the left side. Grenadier: Prussian style mitre.
Neckstock: Black.
Coat: Dark blue with 10 tin buttons down the front with yellow trimmings and 2 tin buttons on small of the back.
Waistcoat: Yellow.
Breeches: Yellow.
Leggings: White stockings with brown leather strap at knee.
Leather gear: Crossbelt: Broad white leather shoulder-strap. Waistbelt: White with brass buckle. Cartridge Box: Black. Bayonet Scabbard: None. Footgear: Black shoes with brass buckles.

Troopers were armed with a bayonet and a musket, the bayonet was fixed to the musket at all times. Non - Commissioned Officers carried halberds and wore almost identical uniforms to regular infantry, with some differences. These were:

- Silver lacing on the tricorne.
- Brass buttons instead of tin buttons.
