= Georg Christoph Grooth =

German painter (1716–1749)

Georg Christoph Grooth (21 January 1716 in Stuttgart – 8 October 1749 in St. Petersburg) was a German painter employed at the Duchy of Württemberg before moving to Imperial Russia to paint portraits of Elizabeth of Russia and Peter III of Russia.

== Sources ==
- "Грот, немецкие живописцы" . Brockhaus and Efron Encyclopedic Dictionary (in Russian). 1906.
