= Charles Emil Lewenhaupt =

Swedish general (1691–1743)

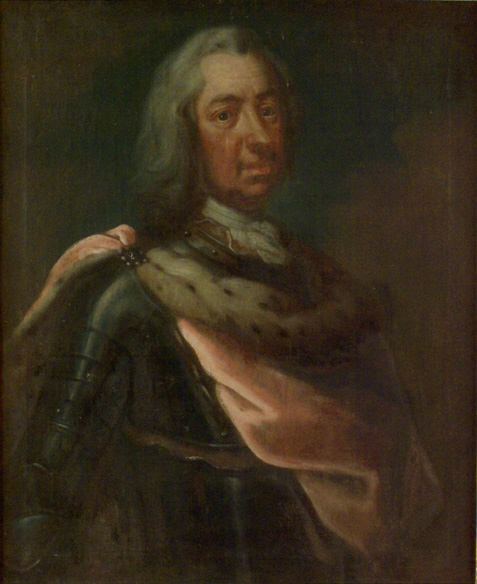
- Portrait by David Klöcker Ehrenstrahl
- Born: 28 March 1691; Stockholm, Sweden
- Died: 4 August 1743 (aged 52); Stockholm, Sweden
- Military career
- Allegiance: Sweden
- Rank: General
- Conflicts: Great Northern War; Battle of Gadebusch; Russo-Swedish War; Capitulation at Helsingfors

Charles Emil Lewenhaupt the Elder (28 March 1691 – 4 August 1743) was a Swedish general.

== Biography ==
Lewenhaupt was born to Count Carl Gustaf Löwenhaupt and Countess Amalia Königsmarck. At the age of 16, he entered Dutch service where he was promoted to the rank of captain in 1709. A year later he entered Swedish service. He was promoted to lieutenant colonel and participated at the battle of Gadebusch in 1712.

In 1720, Lewenhaupt married Beata Cronhielm. The couple had one son, Charles Emil Lewenhaupt the Younger. In 1722, he was promoted to major general. At the Riksdag of the Estates of 1741, he was a factor in the decision to wage war against Imperial Russia, in what became the Russo-Swedish War of 1741–1743.

Following the war, on 20 June 1743, Lewenhaupt was sentenced to death on grounds of poor performance and conduct in the war. The execution was set to 20 July, and later postponed to 30 July. Lewenhaupts' son and a small party managed to free him, but Lewenhaupt was re-arrested when aboard a vessel in the Stockholm archipelago bound for Danzig. On 4 August 1743, Lewenhaupt was decapitated at Norrtull in Stockholm.

== Bibliography ==
- Bergquist, L. (2005). Swedenborg's Secret. London: Swedenborg Society. ISBN 9780854481439.
