= Peter Lacy =

Russian military leader (1678–1751)

Graf Peter von Lacy
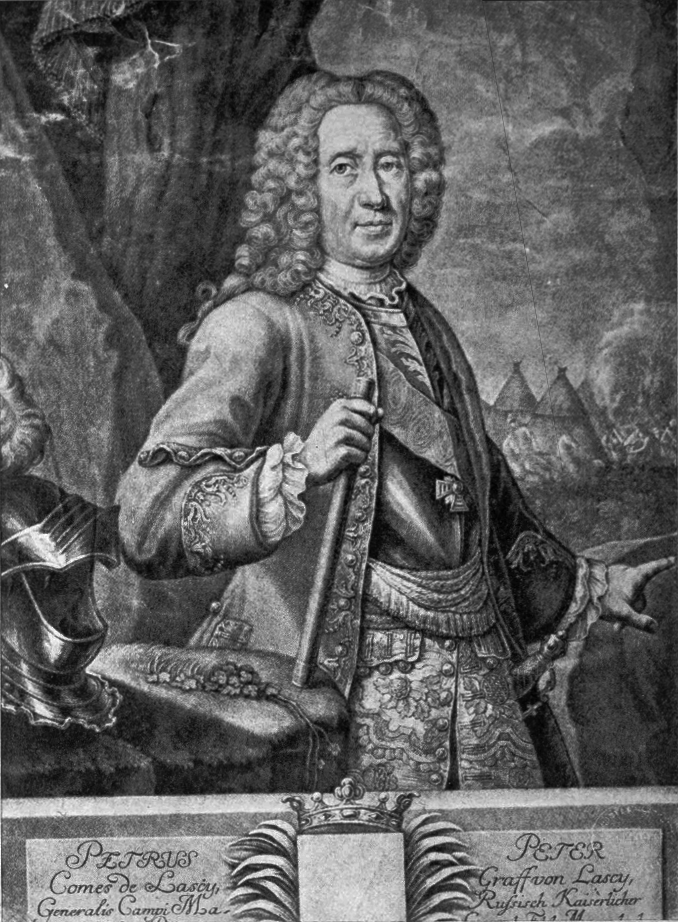
- Peter Lacy by Johann Jacob Haid

Governor of Riga
- In office 1729–1740

Commander of Saint Petersburg and Veliky Novgorod
- In office 1725–1728

Personal details
- Born: Pierce Edmond de Lacy; 30 October 1678 Killeedy, County Limerick, Ireland
- Died: 30 April 1751 (aged 72) Governorate of Livonia, Russian Empire
- Resting place: Skaistkalne
- Spouse: Maret Philippine "Martha" von Funcken
- Children: Count Franz Moritz von Lacy
- Occupation: Soldier
- Awards: Order of Saint Andrew; Order of Saint Alexander Nevsky; Order of the White Eagle (Poland)

Military service
- Years of service: 1691 to 1751
- Rank: General-feldmarshal
- Battles/wars: Expand list: Williamite War in Ireland; Nine Years' War; Great Turkish War; Great Northern War; Battle of Narva; Battle of Hummelshof; Battle of Grodno; Battle of Poltava; Capitulation of Estonia and Livonia; Landings on the coast of Sweden; Russo-Turkish War (1710–1713); Pruth River Campaign; War of the Polish Succession; Siege of Gdańsk; Battle of Wyszecino; Rhine campaign (1735); Russo-Turkish War (1735–1739); Battle of Azov; Crimea; Russo-Swedish War (1741–1743); Battle of Villmanstrand; Capitulation at Helsingfors

Peter Graf von Lacy (Note: Russian: Пётр Петрович Ласси, romanized: Pyotr Petrovich Lassi; English: Pierce Edmond de Lacy; Irish: Peadar (Piarais Éamonn) de Lása.) (26 September 1678 – 30 April 1751) was an Irish-born soldier who later served in the Imperial Russian Army.

Considered one of the most successful Russian commanders before Rumyantsev and Suvorov, in a military career that spanned half a century he claimed to have participated in 31 campaigns, 18 battles, and 18 sieges. He died on his private estate in Riga, where he served as governor for many years. His remains were buried in the crypt of the Catholic church in Skaistkalne, in southern Latvia.

One of his sons was Count Franz Moritz von Lacy, who went on to serve in the Imperial Habsburg Army, while his nephew George Browne (1698–1792) was also a general in the Russian army.

== Life ==
=== Family ===
Peter Lacy was born Pierce Edmond de Lacy on 26 September 1678 in Killeedy near Limerick into a noble Irish family.

In an autobiography preserved by his descendants, Lacy claimed that his father Peter was the son of John Lacy of Ballingarry. Count Peter also claimed Pierce Oge de Lacy of Bruff as a kinsman. It appears that Count Peter's grandfather John Lacy of Ballingarry was of the House of Bruff, and possibly the brother of Pierce (Peter) Oge (the young) Lacy of Bruff (−1607, executed) celebrated from the wars against Elizabeth I, the son of Sir Hempon Pierce de Lacy, who maintained that he was 18th in direct descent from William Gorm de Lacy, son of Hugh de Lacy, Lord of Meath, and great-great-grandson of Walter I de Lacy (–c.1085), the Norman soldier.

His uncle was Lieutenant-Colonel John Lacy of the House of Bruff, and this was the uncle John with whom Count Peter served at the age of 13 in the defence of Limerick, who had rescued Count Peter by buying him off at the capitulation of Limerick, then fled overseas with Count Peter and the rest of his regiment (which included Count Peter's father and brother) to join the Irish Brigade in France, and who was killed in October 1693 while fighting with Count Peter in the battle of the "Val de Marseilles". Lieutenant-Colonel John Lacy of the House of Bruff who had resided in Kilmallock had, before 1647, been an officer in the time of Charles I of England, had fought in France and Flanders, and been a prisoner in England for 2 years. In 1647 he was the only Lacy to be a member of the Supreme Council of Confederate Catholics, and in 1651 he was excluded from amnesty after the 1st Siege of Limerick. He was Deputy Governor of Limerick 1685–86, and one of the representatives of Kilmallock in the Parliament of Dublin in 1689.

=== Early career in Ireland and Western Europe ===
At the age of 13, during the Williamite war in Ireland Peter was attached to the Jacobite defence of Limerick against the Williamites with the rank of Lieutenant. The Flight of the Wild Geese followed, with Peter, his father and his brother joining the Irish Brigade in France. After his relatives lost their lives fighting for Louis XIV in Italy, Peter was induced to seek his fortune elsewhere. After two years of service in the Austrian army, Lacy followed his commander, Charles Eugène de Croÿ, into the Russian service.

=== Service under Peter the Great ===
His first taste of land battle in Russia was the disastrous defeat at Narva, in which Lacy commanded a unit of musketeers, holding the rank of poruchik. During the Great Northern War he was seriously wounded on two occasions, also gaining the rank of colonel in 1706. In the same year, Peter gave him command of the Polotskii regiment and three new regiments raising him to colonel status. The following year he led his brigade at Poltava, in which battle he greatly distinguished himself. In the battle of Rumna, 1708 he attacked and captured the headquarters of Charles XII. He gained fame at this stage by advising the Czar that musketeers should wait until they were within a few yards of the enemy before opening fire. Prior to this, the Russians were known for uncoordinated fire. From this point began his fame as a soldier. His next active service, still under Prince Repnin, was the siege of Riga. Lacy was reputedly the first Russian officer to enter the capital of Livland and he was appointed the first Russian chatelain of Riga Castle in the aftermath.

In 1719 as a Major General Apraksin's fleet landed Lacy with 5,000 infantry and 370 cavalry near Umeå in Sweden, where they proceeded to devastate a dozen iron foundries and a number of mills. Two years later he led a similar action against Sundsvall. Soon promoted to General, he entered the Military Collegium (modelled by Peter I upon the Swedish administrative reforms introduced by Axel Oxenstierna) – as the Russian Ministry of Defense was then known – in 1723. Three years later, Lacy succeeded Repnin in command of the Russian forces quartered in Livland, and in 1729 he was appointed Governor of Riga. These positions brought him in contact with the Duchess of Courland, who before long ascended the Russian throne as Empress Anna. During her reign, Lacy's capacity for supreme command would never be doubted.

Lacy was one of the first recipients of the Order of Saint Alexander Nevsky when it was established, furthermore, he was given command of all infantry in St Petersburg, Ingria and Novgorod. By 1728 he was ranked third of only six full generals in the Russian Army and the only foreigner. As a foreigner, his salary was 3,600 Roubles a year, 15% higher than Russian generals. Higher salaries for foreign-born generals were seen in other ranks too. Lacy's signature, even on documents in Cyrillic script, always appears in English and Latin script which would suggest he never gained proficiency in Russian.

When Catherine was Empress Lacy was given responsibility for removing Maurice de Saxe from Courland. Saxe had managed to gain support and was even mentioned as marrying Anna, Duchess of Courland.

=== Service under Empress Anna ===
Having saved her from marriage to Saxe, Anna was very familiar with Lacy and he became one of her most trusted generals. The War of the Polish Succession again called him into the field. In 1733, Lacy and Munnich expelled the Polish king, Stanisław I, from Warsaw to Danzig, which was besieged by them in 1734. Thereupon the Irishman was commanded to march towards the Rhine and join his 13,500-strong contingent with the forces of Eugene of Savoy. To that end his corps advanced into Germany and, meeting the Austrians on 16 August, returned to winter quarters in Moravia with exemplary discipline. In 1734 he commanded Russian forces at the Siege of Gdańsk in which French and Polish forces were defeated. Lacy led the Russians in two other decisive battles of the conflict, Wisiczin and Busawitza. In the latter battle, he was outnumbered ten to one but nevertheless prevailed. For this victory, he was awarded Order of the White Eagle. After Busawitza Lacy was ordered to reinforce the Austrians at Mannheim. however, when he reached Mannheim peace had been declared. Lacy was received by Emperor Charles and Viennese society. On his return from Vienna, he was met by a courier from St Petersburg who delivered to him his patent honouring him as Field Marshal.

With the patent of Field Marshal was the news that Russia was at war with Turkey and Lacy was ordered at once to capture Azov Fortress. This he did despite being wounded in the fray. Lacy's rival, Burkhard Christoph von Münnich, had been campaigning in the Crimea with little success. Thus, after taking Azov, Lacy was ordered to capture Crimea. Lacy bridged the Sea of Azov at a narrow point near Perekop. Within four days, aided by favourable winds and tides, his entire army crossed it and began marching on Arabat. The Russians met the Khan's much larger Crimean army and routed them in two battles, on 12 and 14 June. In 1738, Lacy's corps again landed in Crimea and took the fortress of Çufut Qale near the Khan's capital, Bakhchisaray. For his success in Poland and Crimea Lacy was awarded the Order of St. Andrew.

As soon as peace had been restored, Lacy was reinstated as the Governor of Livland, while Emperor Charles VI conferred on him the title of an imperial count. His indifference to politics prevented his downfall following Anna's death, when other foreign commanders, most notably von Münnich, fell into disgrace and were expelled from active service.

=== Service under Empress Elizabeth ===
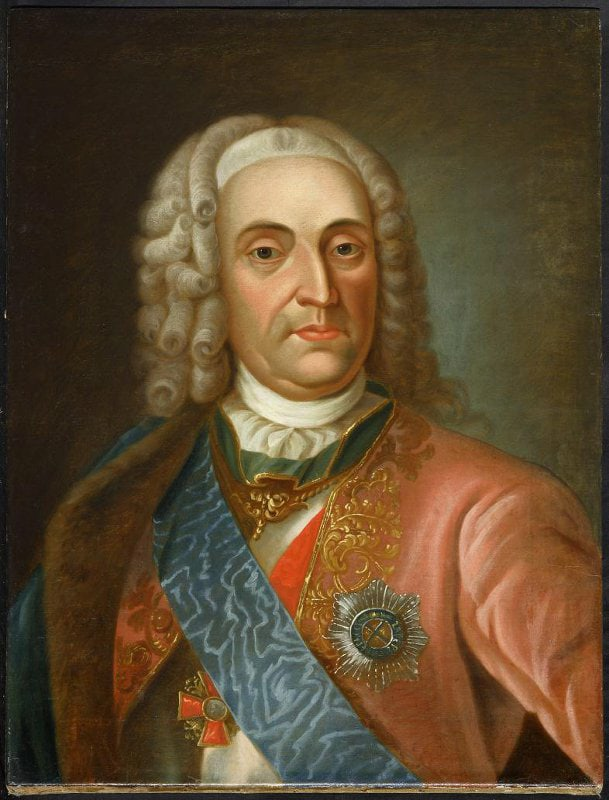
Lacy on 18th-century portrait

In December 1741 Elizabeth seized power. Lacy was roused from bed in the early hours of the morning in a test of his loyalty. He was not aware if the men sent to him were from Elizabeth or Grand Duchess Anna. Lacy was asked what party he was of, Anne or Elizabeth, Lacy answered "Of the party of the reigning Empress." A period of unrest followed and Lacy was called upon to restore order. Most of what was known as the German Faction fell out of favour at this stage. The restoration of order in St Petersburg was largely down to the prompt actions of Lacy.

When the Russo-Swedish War broke out in 1741, the government of Anna Leopoldovna appointed him Commander-in-Chief as the most experienced among Russian generals. Lacy quickly struck against Finland and won his last brilliant victory at Lappeenranta (August 1741). Lacy's force, however, was poorly supplied and he was forced to withdraw to St Petersburg. The following year he rallied his forces and proceeded to capture Hamina, Porvoo and Hämeenlinna, by August encircling more than 17,000 Swedes near Helsinki and effectively bringing the hostilities to an end.

The war over, Lacy withdrew to Riga and resumed the command of the Russian forces stationed in Livland. He administered what is now Northern Latvia and Southern Estonia until his death on 30 April 1751 in Riga. His son Franz Moritz von Lacy had entered the Austrian service in 1743 and became one of the most successful imperial commanders of the 18th century.

Lacy was one of those knightly natures that were still encountered in the first half of the 18th century. He had to sell his sword out of necessity, but he faithfully and honestly served the one who paid. A warrior by nature and inclination, he loved and knew his business and stood out from other Russian commanders from among foreigners in that he always and everywhere pursued the interests of Russia, and not his own. He never showed any inclination to become famous for the needless shedding of Russian blood, which was alien to him, and never dared to undertake such desperate deeds as Münnich had thundered about.

— Alexander Polovtsov, Russian Biographical Dictionary, vol. 10 (1914): Лабзина – Ляшенко, p. 86

=== Marriage and children ===
Count Peter married Baltic German noblewoman Maret Philippine ("Martha") von Funcken from Liezere, widow of the young Count Hannes Kristof Frölich (d. 1710), and daughter of General Remmert von Funcken, Lord of Liezere, and his second wife, Baroness Helena Üksküla. They had five daughters and two sons.

One son was Franz Moritz von Lacy, the famous Austrian field marshal who was also a count of the Holy Roman Empire.

Nothing is known about the other, supposedly older, son and in some references, he is incorrectly attributed with accolades that belong to his father Count Peter and/or his brother Count Franz.

== Ancestry ==
Ancestors of Peter Lacy

4. John (de) Lacy of Ballingarry (Limerick)
2. Peter (Pierce) (de) Lacy; of Killeedy (Limerick)
1. Count Peter von Lacy; [Peter (Pierce) (de) Lacy of Killeedy (Limerick)] (1678–1751)
3. Maria Courteney

== Orders ==
- Order of St. Andrew
- Order of St. Alexander Nevsky granted 1725 during Coronation ceremonies of the Czarina, Catherine I
- Order of the White Eagle (Poland)

== See also ==
- Irish military diaspora
- Irish regiments

== Sources ==
- "Ласси, русские военачальники" . Brockhaus and Efron Encyclopedic Dictionary (in Russian). 1906.
- Ó'Ciardha, Eamonn (2014). "Peter Lacy, the Prince Eugene of Muscovy". History Ireland. 22 (6): 14–16. JSTOR 44897442.
