= Russo-Swedish War (1741–1743) =

18th-century war in Finland

- Part of the War of the Austrian Succession and a series of Russo-Swedish wars
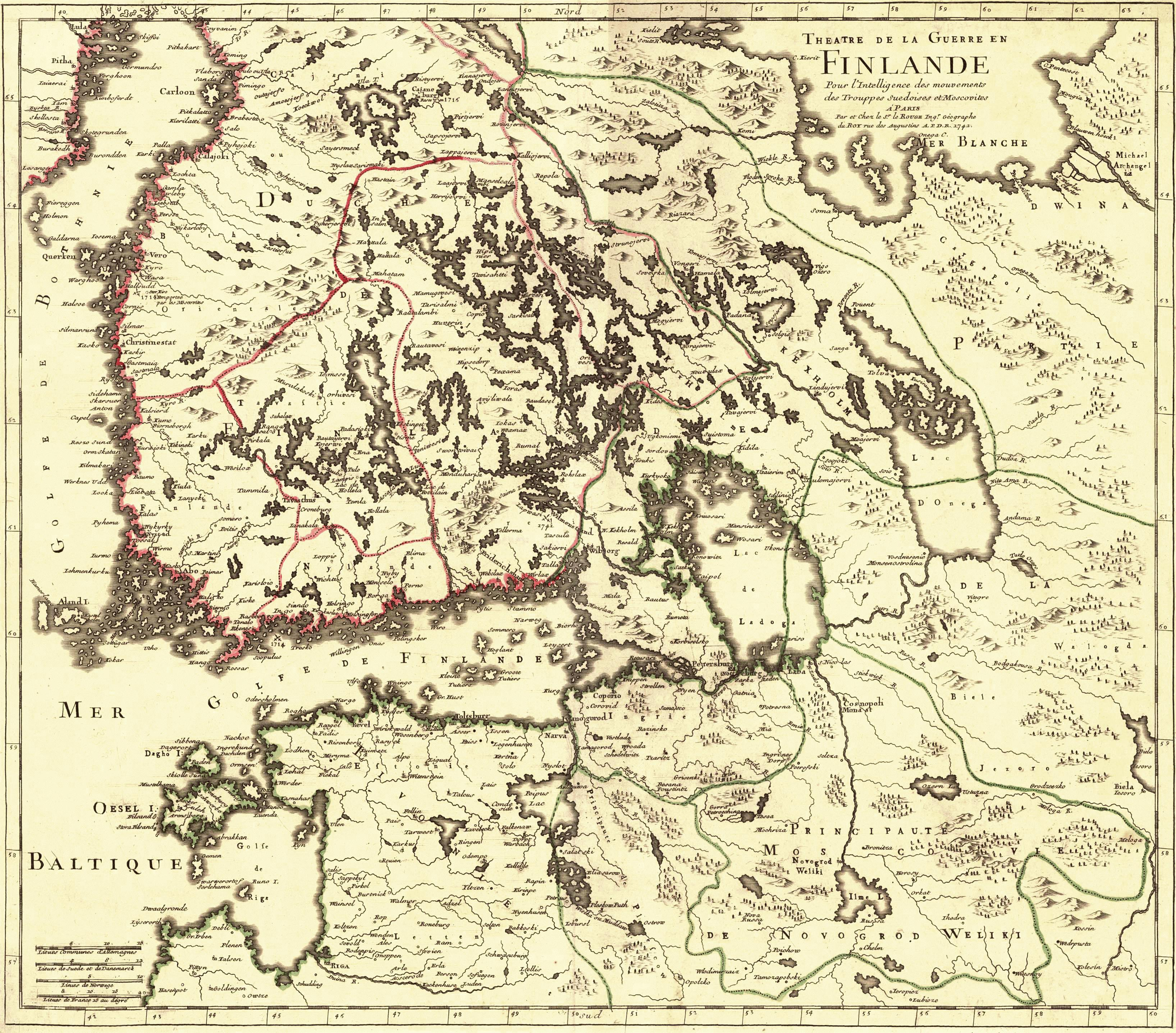
- A 1742 map of the location of the war.
Date	8 August 1741 – 18 August 1743
Location	Finland
Result	Russian victory; Treaty of Åbo (Turku)
Territorial changes	Russia acquires the land east of the Kymi River with the fortress of Olofsborg (Olavinlinna) and the towns of Villmanstrand (Lappeenranta) and Fredrikshamn (Hamina)

Belligerents
Russian Empire: Kingdom of Finland	Sweden

Commanders and leaders
(Russian Empire) Peter von Lacy; (Russian Empire) James Keith	Charles Lewenhaupt; Henrik Magnus von Buddenbrock

Strength
70,000 total	Unknown

Casualties and losses
10,000 dead	50,000 total loses

The Russo-Swedish War of 1741–1743 (also known as The War of the Hats or The Hats' war) was instigated by the Hats, a Swedish political party that aspired to regain the territories lost to Russia during the Great Northern War, and by French diplomacy, which sought to divert Russia's attention from supporting its long-standing ally the Habsburg monarchy in the War of the Austrian Succession. The war was a disaster for Sweden, which lost more territory to Russia.

== Swedish preparations ==
Swedish officer Malcolm Sinclair undertook a trip with the aim of trying to arrange a safer way of diplomatic communications between Sweden and the Ottoman Empire in 1738. He brought an extra copy of a letter intended for the Swedish ministers in Constantinople on the subject of negotiations with the Ottoman Empire on a possible alliance against Russia. Although the diplomatic mission was kept in high secrecy the Russian Minister Plenipotentiary in Stockholm, Bestuzhev-Ryumin, became aware of it and forwarded the information to the Russian government. Sinclair accomplished his mission and at the beginning of April 1739 left Constantinople. On 17 June, between Grüneberg (Zielona Góra) and Neustadt (Prudnik), he was overtaken by two Russian officers, captain Kütler and lieutenant Lewitzki, who were dispatched by Münnich with an order to "catch up" the envoy. The officers took away from Sinclair his diplomatic papers, pulled him out of the coach and took him aside to a forest where he was killed and looted. The Russian government denied the responsibility for the assassination. In Sweden the assassination brought tremendous resentment around the country and hatred towards Russia.

In the summer of 1740, the commander of Swedish forces in Finland, General Carl Cronstedt, was removed from his post due to his opposition to the planned war and Charles Emil Lewenhaupt was elevated to the vacant position. However, Finnish defenses had fallen into disrepair as most of the funds for their support were used elsewhere in the kingdom. Neither had any preparations been made as a result of what had taken place in the Great Northern War. In the end what funds that were allocated for Finland were used for preparations for offensive war instead of strengthening the defenses.

The Swedish war plan was to first capture Vyborg and then advance further towards Saint Petersburg. The objective of these maneuvers was to threaten Saint Petersburg and to set the stage for a coup d'état engineered by French and Swedish diplomats and aimed at toppling the pro-Austrian regime of Anna Leopoldovna. The coup did take place in December, but the new empress, Elizaveta Petrovna, reneged on her promises to return the Baltic provinces to Sweden and continued the vigorous prosecution of the war, under the guidance of her pro-Austrian chancellor, Aleksey Bestuzhev.

While Swedish troops were being deployed at the Russian border, near Villmanstrand (Lappeenranta) and Frederikshamn (Hamina), Swedish naval forces consisting of ten ships of the line and four frigates under Admiral Tomas von Rajalin and 20 galley strong rowing fleet under Admiral Abraham Falkengren moved on 20 May 1741 to the islands near the border. While standing idle an epidemic broke out in the fleet largely paralyzing it and claiming the life of Admiral von Rajalin. The Swedish declaration of war in late July had been intended to coincide with the invasion but now it failed to do so since the fleet was unable to take action and concentration of the ground forces had not yet been carried out. The situation was not improved by the fact that Lewenhaupt arrived in Finland two months after the declaration of war and command of the army fell to General Henrik Magnus von Buddenbrock.

== War ==
=== 1741 ===
Due to Swedish inaction, the Russians seized the initiative and struck first with an army of 16,000 men under Field Marshal Peter Lacy, advancing from Vyborg (Viborg, Viipuri) towards Villmanstrand (Lappeenranta). With a nearly fourfold superiority in numbers, the Russians inflicted a major defeat on General Carl Henrik Wrangel's Swedish garrison in the Battle of Villmanstrand. Blame for the defeat at Villmanstrand was placed on General von Buddenbrock who had not believed that the Russians were seriously attacking and did not move to aid Wrangel.

Lewenhaupt, who arrived ten days after the defeat, tried to organize a joint operation by both land and naval forces towards Vyborg but Admiral Aron Sjöstierna, who took von Rajalin's position, made it clear that the fleet would not be able to do it. The Russian fleet had also fallen into disrepair and was unable to take part in the fighting in 1741. Sjöstierna sailed home on 22 September and the commander of the remaining Swedish vessels ignored Lewenhaupt's attempts to persuade him to sail to Beryozovye Islands (Björkö, Koivisto) and instead sailed back to Sweden on 27 October. Operations on the land front also came to a halt when an armistice was agreed to with Russia in early December.

=== 1742 ===
The Russians reneged on their ceasefire agreement early in March 1742, but a harsh winter made it impossible for the main armies to operate. Light Russian cavalry forces (cossacks and hussars) raided the Swedish side of the border but were often repulsed by local populations. In March, the Russians, under the command of Woldemar Löwendal, also attempted to raid the Swedish anchorage near Frederikshamn over ice, but the harsh weather made it impossible. Swedish General Lewenhaupt planned to renew the attack against Vyborg in the spring of 1742. Swedish naval units required to support the attack started to arrive in mid-May. However, since the naval commanders had been ordered to patrol between Reval (Tallinn) and Helsingfors (Helsinki) they refused to follow Lewenhaupt's orders.

The main Swedish fleet arrived on 3 June from Sweden under Admiral Sjöstierna and consisted of fifteen ships of the line and five frigates. The fleet sailed to Äspö (Haapasaaret; 25 km SSE from modern-day Kotka). A week later, a galley fleet commanded by Admiral Falkengren joined the main fleet, bringing 25 galleys and some support ships. However, unlike in the previous year, the Russian fleet was also active with a galley fleet of 45 galleys under General Vasily Yakovlevich Levashov and an open sea fleet of at least 12 ships of the line under Admiral Zahar Danilovich Mishukov. Regardless, Lewenhaupt held a council of war on 5 June in an attempt to get naval units to sail to the Beryozovye Islands (Björkö, Koivisto) but the naval commanders judged the risk for the fleet to be too great and Lewenhaupt was forced to back down from his plan.

Since the Swedish army remained inactive, the Russians again seized the initiative and moved onto the offensive. With the support of the Russian galley fleet, a 30,000 men strong Russian army under the command of Field Marshal Lacy marched from Vyborg. It crossed the border on 13 June and then continued advancing towards Frederikshamn. The Swedes had prepared a strong defensive position outside of Frederikshamn, at Mäntlahti. The Swedish colonel defending the position had become aware of the Russian approach and withdrew all his forces from the fortified positions to Frederikshamn a day before the Russian attack, which was to take place on 25 June. However, the abandoned position was critical for the town's defense and by 28 June, the Swedish army under Lewenhaupt set the town on fire and started withdrawing.

Co-operation with Swedish naval and land forces did not go smoothly and instead of supporting the army, the bulk of the fleet sailed directly to Hangö (Hanko) when the army started its withdrawal. Galleys sailed to Pellinge (Pellinki). This in turn cut off the army from its supply lines and Lewenhaupt started withdrawing further towards the army's supply depots at Borgå (Porvoo). Russians followed the withdrawing Swedes but no real action between the armies, apart from skirmishes between the Swedish rearguard and Russian cavalry patrols, took place. On 18 July after learning that Swedish garrisons further inland had left their posts, Lewenhaupt and the army council judged it to be best to withdraw to Helsingfors to prepare its defenses.

The Swedes started to dismantle and transport away the food and supply stores concentrated in Borgå. On 27 July Russians arrived in the vicinity and moved into Borgå on 30 July, which the Swedish army had abandoned one day earlier. The Swedish withdrawal, which had lasted nearly two months, finally ended in Helsingfors on 11 August. A couple of days later, the Russians had managed to completely surround the town on land. The Swedish galley fleet was stationed east of Helsingfors but judged its position to be untenable and withdrew into the town as well, allowing the Russian galley fleet to complete encirclement of the town after 20 August.

Before the town was completely cut off, on 19 August General Lewenhaupt and General Buddenbrock were summoned to proceed immediately to Stockholm for an inquiry into their actions. Both generals were imprisoned on their arrival and they were placed on trial. The deputy commander of Swedish forces, General Jean Louis Bousquet, signed a surrender document on 24 August. According to the terms of the document, the Finnish men were released from the army while the Swedish men were allowed to sail back home. All guns, supplies, and even fodder stores were to be given over to the Russians. All Swedish naval forces returned to Sweden in early September 1742. The Russians advanced all the way to Åland and cut Finland off from the rest of the Sweden. At about this time a small Swedish detachment attacked a Russian cavalry detachment at Kemi. All of Finland fell under Russian occupation (1742–1743) which became later known as the Lesser Wrath (Finnish: Pikkuviha).

=== 1743 ===
The Swedish army retook Åland in March 1743 and at the start of May, a fleet of 16 ships of the line and 5 frigates under Admiral Jean von Utfall arrived to block the coastal sea route past Hangö. Admiral Falkengren's galley fleet was sent to Åland. The task of these naval forces was to prevent Russian forces from reaching Sweden. However, before the Swedish forces arrived, a Russian galley fleet under General James Francis Edward Keith passed Hangö. The Swedish galley fleet attacked the Russian galley fleet in the Battle of Korpoström at the narrows of Korpoström, just south of the island of Korpo, where the Swedish attack was repulsed. Falkengren returned to Åland.

The Swedish open sea fleet at Hangö still blocked the passage of Field-Marshal Peter Lacy's 50 galley strong coastal fleet. However, on 7 June, a Russian fleet led by Admiral Nikolai Fedorovich Golovin managed to draw the Swedish fleet out of its anchorage while not actually engaging in a fight. This allowed the Russian galley fleet to safely pass the cape. The result was overwhelming Russian naval superiority in south-western Finland and areas near Åland, which forced the Swedish fleet to move to the west of Åland and hastened the peace negotiations. Admiral Golovin later faced a military tribunal for his refusal to engage the Swedish squadron of equal strength but was cleared when he referred to an edict from Peter the Great which stated that a Russian fleet should not engage in battle unless having 3:2 superiority or better. Swedish generals Lewenhaupt and Buddenbrock were both beheaded primarily as scapegoats for the failed war-policy of the ruling "Hat" faction.

== Treaty of Åbo ==
As soon as hostilities ceased and the Russian army entered Åbo (Turku), the statesmen Alexander Rumyantsev and Erik Mathias von Nolcken arrived at the city in order to discuss a peace settlement. The Tsarina promised to evacuate her army from Finland on the condition that Adolf Frederick of Holstein-Gottorp—that is, the uncle of her own heir apparent—was named as the heir to the throne of Sweden. (The latter had been offered the crown of Finland by the local lantdag). The Hats acquiesced in her proposal in the hope that Adolf Frederick would be able to obtain better terms from her. Elizabeth also wanted Russian forces to occupy Sweden in order to ensure Adolf Frederick's peaceful election, but this plan aroused the vehement opposition of the Swedish representatives and was abandoned.

While peace negotiations lumbered on Lacy—who had distinguished himself in similar operations during the Great Northern War—embarked from Kronstadt in order to effect a landing in Sweden proper. When the Baltic Fleet was approaching Umeå, news came that the Treaty of Åbo had been finalized, with Sweden ceding to Russia the towns of Villmanstrand (Lappeenranta) and Fredrikshamn (Hamina) and a strip of Finland to the northwest of Saint Petersburg. The Kymi River was to form part of the border between the two powers. The treaty marked the further decline of Sweden as a great power in Northern Europe.

The territory ceded to Russia was added to the Russian gains in the Treaty of Nystad (Uusikaupunki) in 1721, under the Governorate of Vyborg. This was later incorporated into the Russian Grand Duchy of Finland in 1812.

== See also ==
- Battle of Villmanstrand
- Anna Margareta Salmelin (1716–1789), a Finnish prisoner of war
- Finnish War, a Russo-Swedish war in 1808–1809
- Old Finland, the area that Russia gained from Sweden in war

== Bibliography ==
- Hatakka, Sampsa. "The supply challenges of the Swedish army during the Russo-Swedish War of 1741–1743". In Petri Talvitie & Juha-Matti Granqvist (Eds.), Civilians and military supply in early modern Finland (Helsinki University Press, 2021) pp. 177–202. doi:10.33134/HUP-10-6
- Merovuo, Jenni. "‘Divided and validated’? The institutionalization of the Russo-Swedish border region in the 1743 peace treaty." Hungarian Geographical Bulletin 66.4 (2017): 283–293. online
- Mattila, Tapani (1983). Meri maamme turvana [Sea safeguarding our country] (in Finnish). Jyväskylä: K. J. Gummerus Osakeyhtiö. ISBN 951-99487-0-8.
- Shpilevskaya, Natalya (1859). Описание войны между Россией и Швецией в Финляндии в 1741, 1742 и 1743 гг. [Description of the war between Russia and Sweden in Finland in 1741, 1742 and 1743.] (in Russian). Saint-Petersburg.
- Егоршина, Петрова (2023). История русской армии [The history of the Russian Army] (in Russian). Moscow: Edition of the Russian Imperial Library. ISBN 978-5-699-42397-2.
