= Grand Duchy of Finland =

Administrative unit of the Russian Empire (1809–1917) and the Russian Republic (1917)

Grand Duchy of Finland: Suomen suuriruhtinaanmaa (Finnish); Storfurstendömet Finland (Swedish); Великое княжество Финляндское (Russian)
- 1809–1917
- Coat of arms

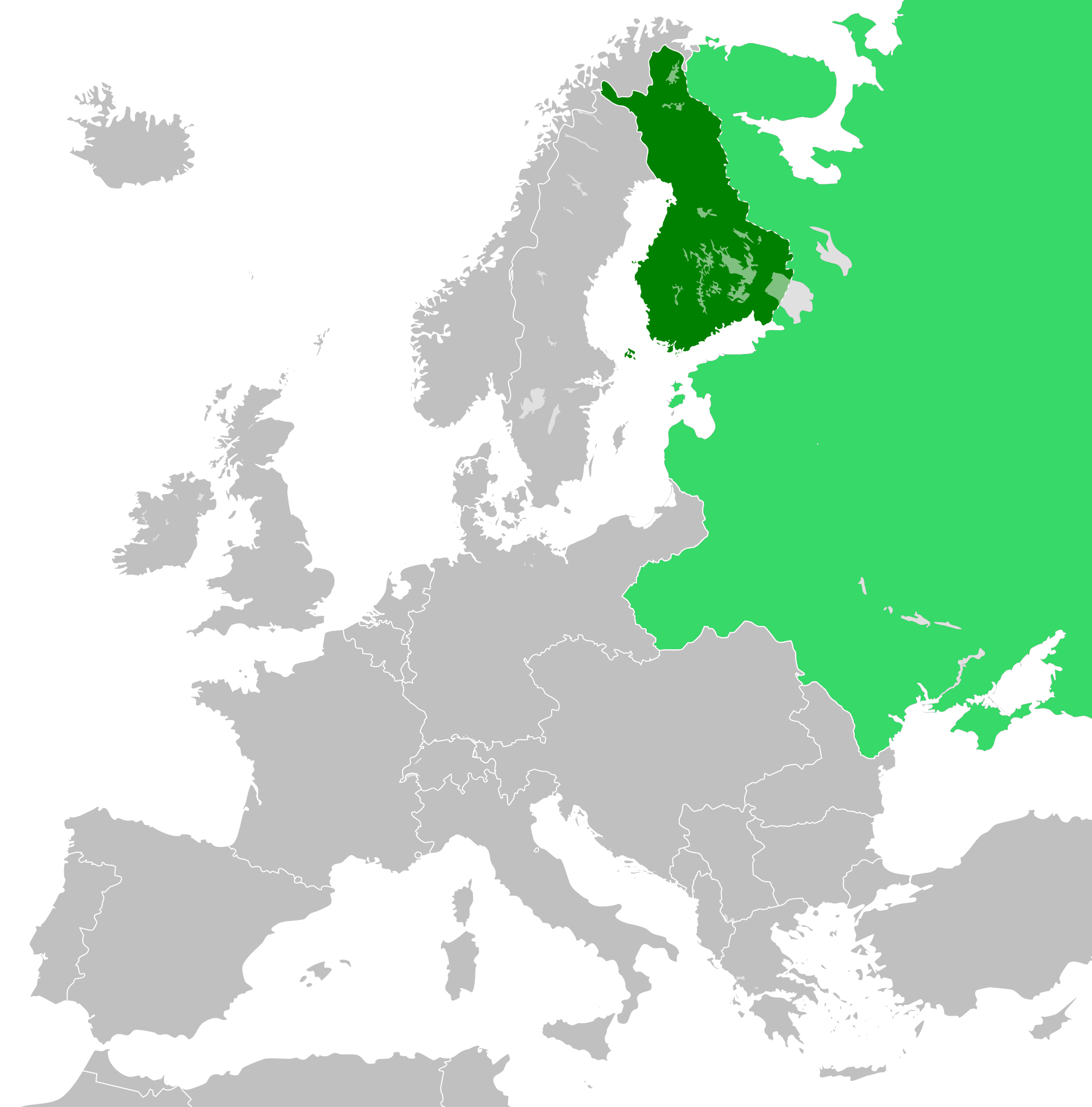
- The Grand Duchy of Finland (dark green) within the Russian Empire (the rest of which in light green) at the turn of the 20th century
- Status: Autonomous grand duchy within the Russian Empire
- Capital: Turku (1809–1812); Helsinki (1812–1917)
- Official languages: Swedish; Finnish (regionally since 1858, country-wide since 1863); Russian (co-official 1900–1917) (Note: Sole "language of administration" following the 1899 February Manifesto, which was de facto suspended and partially reversed following the 1905 Revolution.)
- Common languages: German; Northern Sámi; Inari Sámi; Skolt Sámi; Karelian; Finnish Romani
- Religion: Official religions: Evangelical Lutheran (until 1867); Russian Orthodox (until 1917); Minority religions: Roman Catholic; Baptist; Sunni Islam; Judaism
- Demonym: Finnish
- Government: Monarchy
- Grand Prince
  - 1809–1825: Alexander I
  - 1825–1855: Nicholas I
  - 1855–1881: Alexander II
  - 1881–1894: Alexander III
  - 1894–1917: Nicholas II
- Governor-General
  - 1809 (first): Georg Sprengtporten
  - 1917 (last): Nikolai Nekrasov
- Vice Chairman
  - 1822–1826 (first): Carl Erik Mannerheim
  - 1917 (last): Anders Wirenius
- Legislature: Diet (1809–1906); Parliament (1906–1917)
- History
  - Diet of Porvoo: 29 March 1809
  - Treaty of Fredrikshamn: 17 September 1809
  - Independence declared: 6 December 1917
- Currency: Swedish riksdaler (1809–1840); Russian ruble (1840–1860); Finnish markka 1860–1917)
Preceded by	Succeeded by
Finland under Swedish rule; Vyborg Governorate	Republic of Finland
- Today part of: Finland; Russia

The Grand Duchy of Finland (Note: While modern Finnish historiography uses the term Suomen suuriruhtinaskunta, matching Swedish Storfurstendömet Finland and Russian Великое княжество Финляндское (Velikoye knyazhestvo Finlyandskoye), all of which better translate to Grand Principality of Finland, contemporary sources use the term Suomen suuriruhtinaanmaa.) was the direct predecessor to modern Finland, existing from 1809 to 1917 as an autonomous region within the Russian Empire and briefly under the Russian Provisional Government.

Originating in the 16th century as a titular grand duchy held by the King of Sweden, Finland was ceded to Russia following the Finnish War of 1808–1809. At the 1809 Diet of Porvoo, Emperor Alexander I pledged to uphold Finland's fundamental laws, Lutheran religion, and estate privileges. The emperor of Russia ruled as the Grand Duke of Finland, represented locally by a governor-general, while domestic administration was conducted by native officials through the Senate of Finland. Throughout most of the 19th century, Finland maintained broad internal autonomy, preserving its Swedish legal system and establishing its own customs boundary, currency (1860), and separate civil service.

The reign of Alexander II (1855–1881) brought significant liberalization, industrial expansion, and the elevation of the Finnish language to official status alongside Swedish. In 1906, following the 1905 Russian Revolution, Finland replaced its four-estate Diet with a unicameral Parliament based on universal suffrage, becoming the first European territory to grant women the right to stand for election. Tensions escalated in the late 19th and early 20th centuries as imperial authorities implemented Russification policies aimed at curtailing Finnish legislative and administrative autonomy. Following the collapse of the Russian monarchy in 1917, the Finnish Parliament approved the Declaration of Independence on 6 December 1917.

== History ==
An extended Southwest Finland was made a titular grand duchy in 1581, when King Johan III of Sweden, who as a prince had been the duke of Finland (1556–1561/63), extended the list of subsidiary titles of the kings of Sweden considerably. The new title of grand duke of Finland did not result in any Finnish autonomy, as Finland was an integrated part of the Kingdom of Sweden with full parliamentary representation for its counties. During the next two centuries, the title was used by some of Johan's successors on the throne, but not all. Usually, it was just a subsidiary title of the King, used only on very formal occasions. However, in 1802, as an indication of his resolve to keep Finland within Sweden in the face of increased Russian pressure, King Gustav IV Adolf gave the title to his new-born son, Prince Carl Gustaf, who died three years later.

During the Finnish War between Sweden and Russia, the four Estates of occupied Finland were assembled at the Diet of Porvoo on 29 March 1809 to pledge allegiance to Tsar Alexander I of Russia, who in return guaranteed that the area's laws and liberties, as well as religion, would be left unchanged. Following the Swedish defeat in the war and the signing of the Treaty of Fredrikshamn on 17 September 1809, Finland became a true autonomous grand duchy within the Russian Empire; but the usual balance of power between monarch and diet resting on taxation was not in place, since the emperor could rely on the rest of his vast empire. The title "Grand Duke of Finland" was added to the long list of titles of the Russian tsar.

After his return to Finland in 1812, the Finnish-born Gustaf Mauritz Armfelt became counsellor to the Russian emperor. Armfelt was instrumental in securing the grand duchy as state with greater autonomy within the Russian Empire, and acquiring so-called Old Finland that Russia had annexed from Sweden in the Treaty of Nystad (1721) and the Treaty of Åbo (1743).

=== Beginning of the Grand Duchy ===
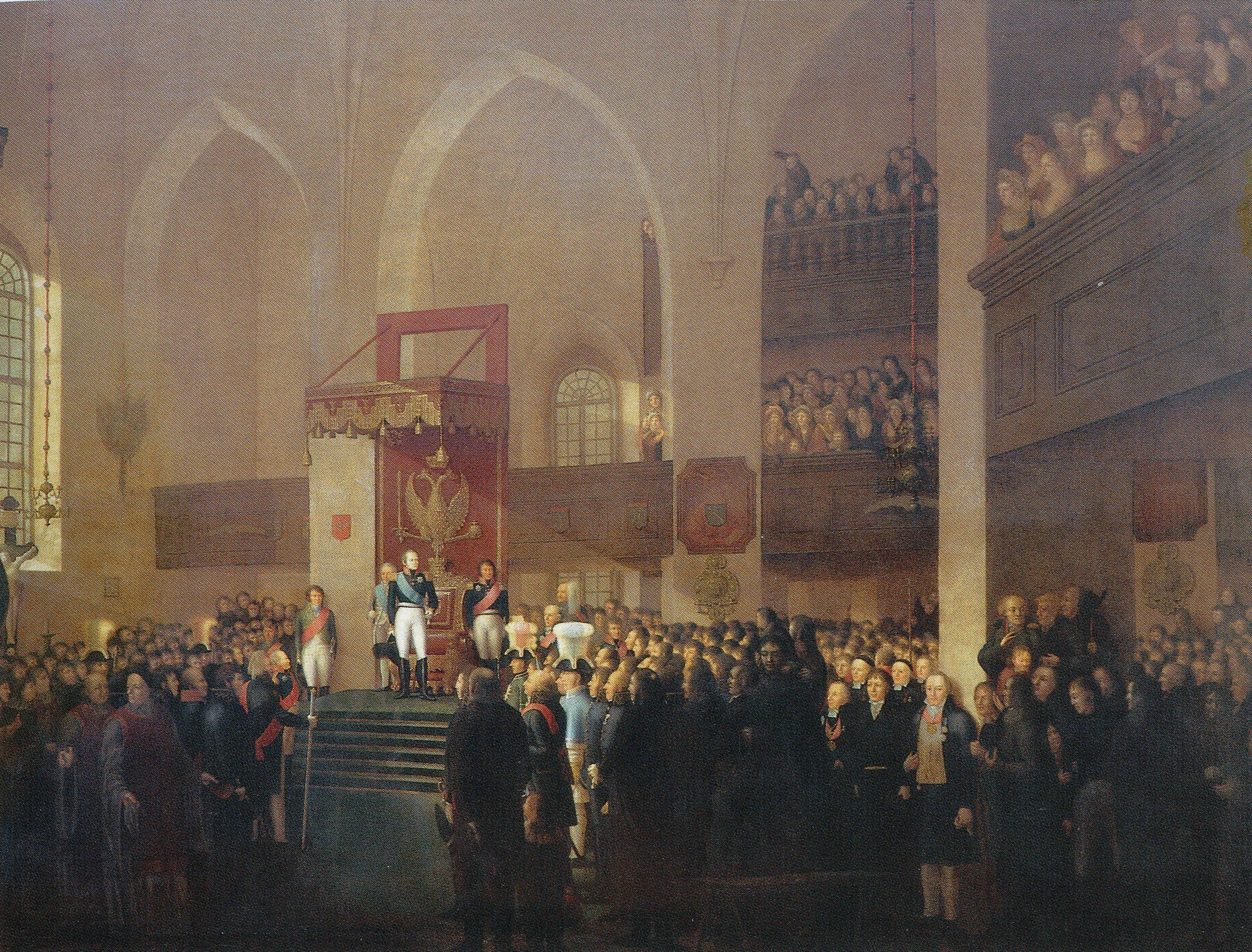
The Diet of Porvoo marked the beginning of autonomous Grand Duchy of Finland. Emperor Alexander I of Russia on the podium.

The formation of the grand duchy stems from the Treaty of Tilsit between Tsar Alexander I of Russia and Emperor Napoleon I of the French. The treaty mediated peace between Russia and France and allied the two countries against Napoleon's remaining threats: the United Kingdom and Sweden. Russia invaded Finland in February 1808, claimed as an effort to impose military sanctions against Sweden, but not a war of conquest, and that Russia decided to only temporarily control Finland. Collectively, the Finns were predominately anti-Russian, and Finnish guerrillas and peasant uprisings were large obstacles for the Russians, forcing Russia to use various tactics to quash armed Finnish rebellion. Thus, in the beginning of the war, General roda Voysk Friedrich Wilhelm von Buxhoeveden, with permission of the tsar, imposed an oath of fealty on Finland, in which Russia would honour Finland's Lutheran faith, the Diet of Finland, and the Finnish estates as long as the Finns would remain loyal to the Russian imperial crown. The oath also dubbed any person who gave aid to the Swedish or Finnish armies a rebel.

The cession of Finland to the Russian Empire in 1809 represented a significant and bitter loss for the Kingdom of Sweden. For more than six centuries, Finland had formed an integral part of the Swedish realm, providing both manpower and strategic depth. Finnish participation was instrumental in Sweden's ascent to great-power status during the seventeenth century, when the Swedish Empire expanded across the Baltic region.

The Finns complied, bitter over Sweden abandoning the country for their war against Denmark and France, and begrudgingly embraced Russian conquest. The Diet of Finland was now to only meet whenever requested, and was never mentioned in the manifesto published by the Ministry of Foreign Affairs. Further on, Alexander I requested a deputation of the four Finnish estates, as he expressed concern over continued Finnish resistance. The deputation refused to act without the Diet, to which Alexander agreed with, and promised the Diet would shortly be summoned. By 1809, all of Finland had been conquered and the Diet was summoned in March. Finland was then united through Russia via the crown, and Finland was able to keep the majority of its own laws, giving it autonomy.

Instead of the newly acquired territory being subjected to direct rule by an imperial governor-general, a novel administrative system was established in Finland, drafted in part by the liberal Mikhail Speransky. The new grand duchy would be governed by a Government Council, later the Senate of Finland, a body made up of Finnish citizens. The governor-general would accordingly have a relatively diminished role. Further, the emperor would deal with matters relating to Finland directly through a dedicated Secretary of State, without the involvement of his Russian cabinet or administration. This laid the foundation for the considerable autonomy enjoyed by Finland for most of the period of Russian rule.

=== Early years ===
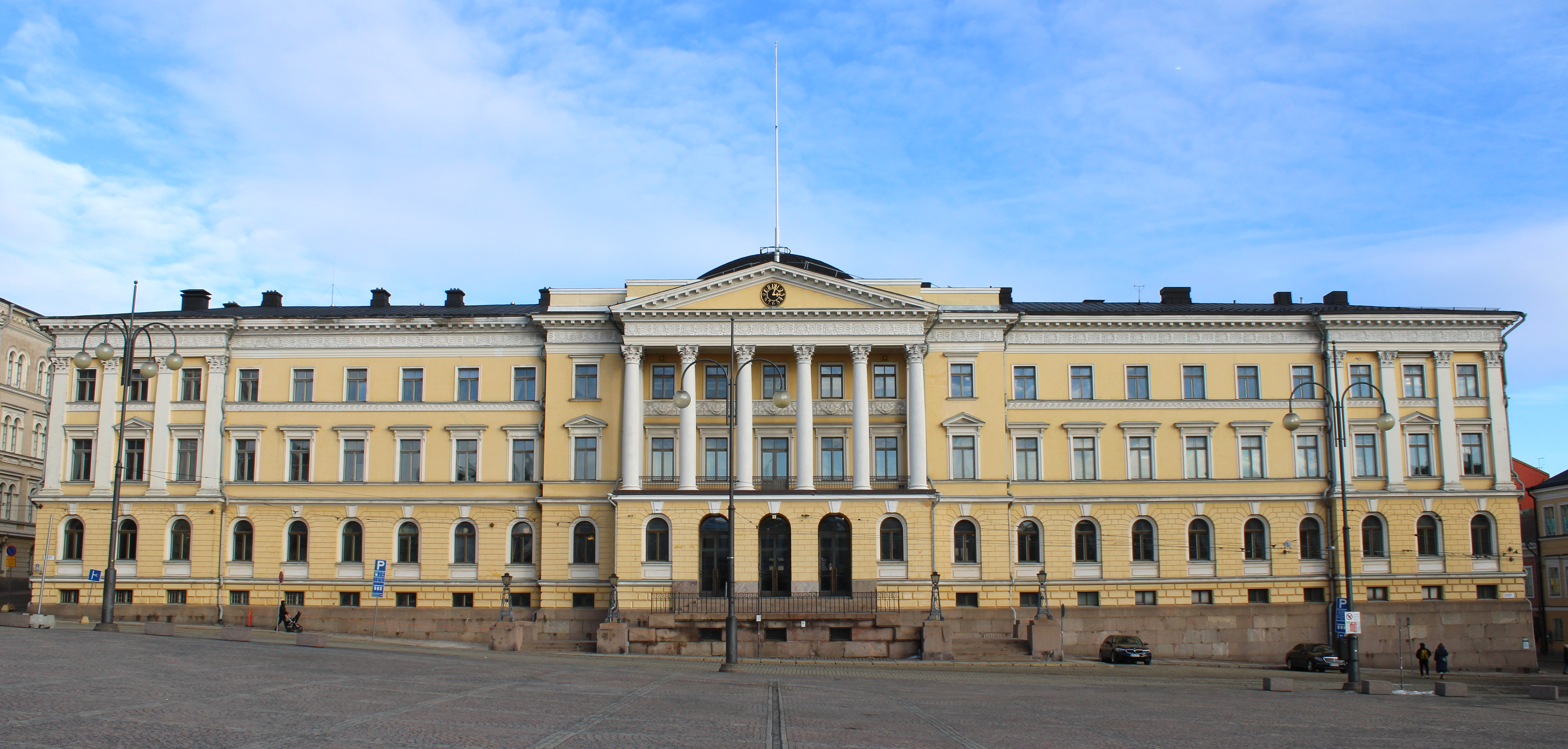
The Imperial Senate of Finland in the new capital of Finland, Helsinki.

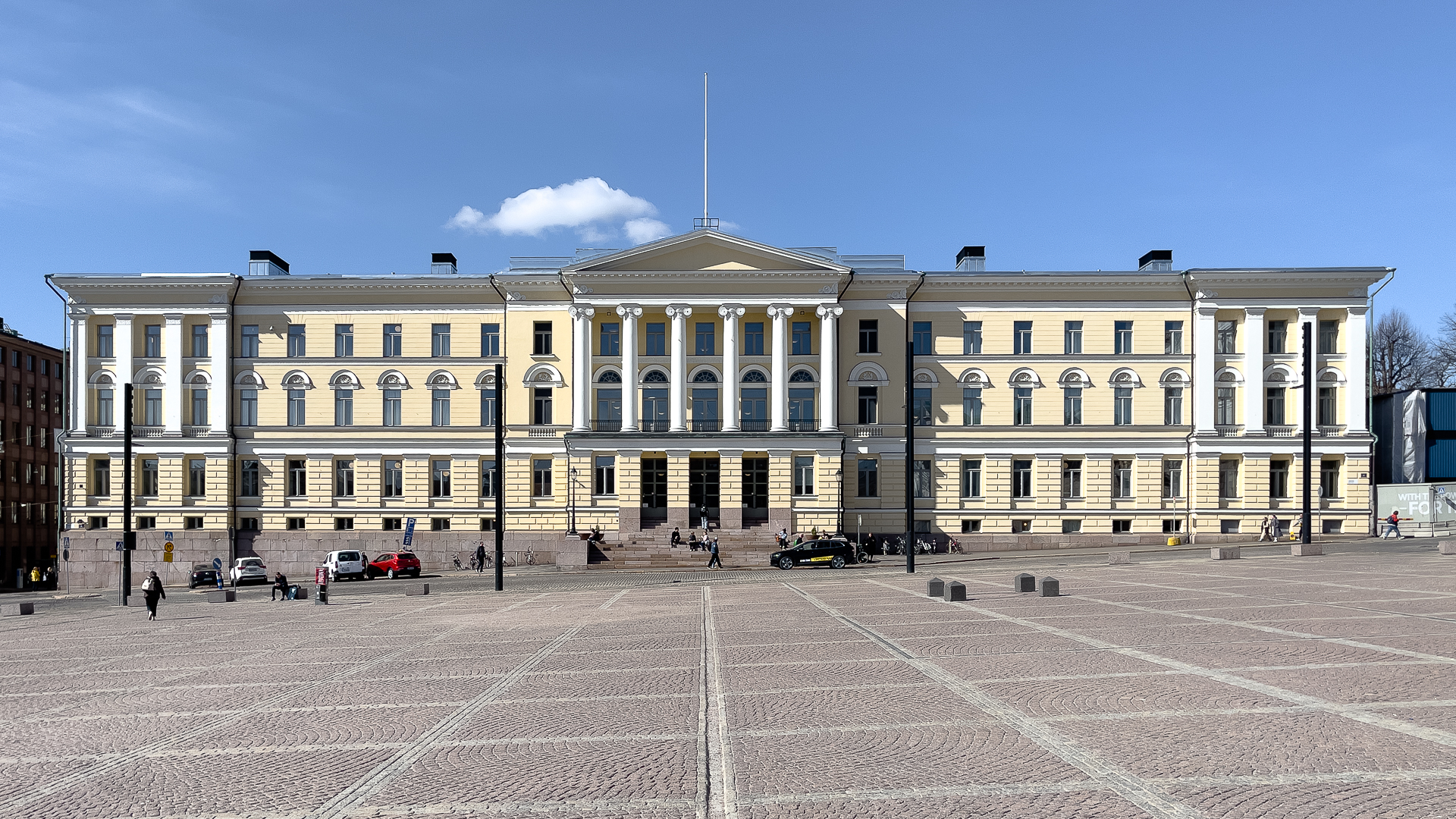
The Imperial Alexander University in Helsinki.

Despite promises of a Finnish Diet, the Diet was not called to meet until 1863 and many new laws going through the legislature were laws that would have required the approval of the Diet while under Swedish rule. Alexander went a step further to demand a Finnish House of Nobles, which organised in 1818. The house was designed to register all noble families in Finland so that the highest Finnish estate would be representative of the next Finnish Diet.

Whether or not Alexander purposely ignored the existence of the Diet is debatable, with notable factors such as the fall of Napoleon and the creation of the Holy Alliance, newfound religious mysticism of the Russian crown, and the negative experience with the Polish Sejm. Despite this, Alexander I ceased to give in to Finnish affairs and returned to governing Russia.

=== Alexander's death and the assimilation of Finland: 1820s–1850s ===
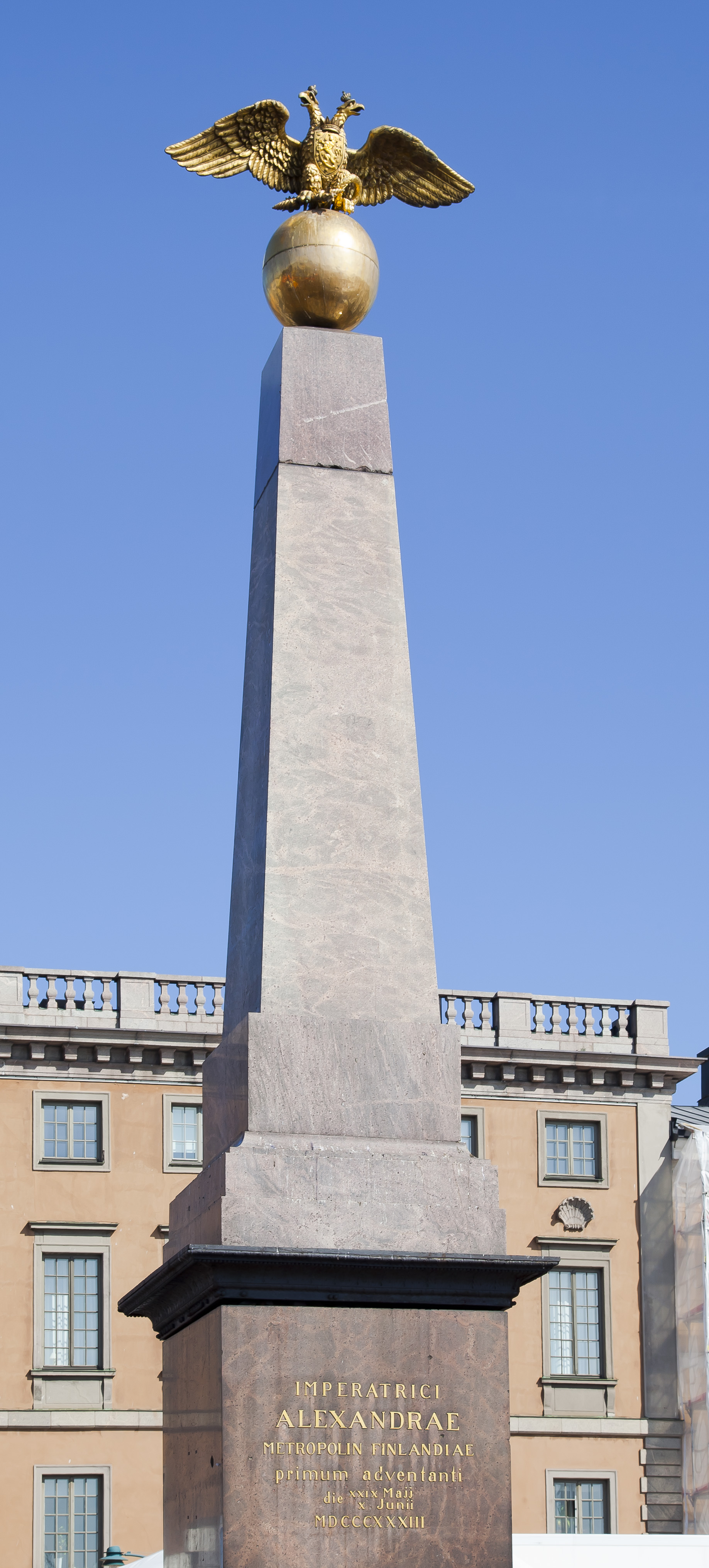
Emperor Nicholas I and Empress Alexandra Feodorovna visited Helsinki in 1833. Carl Ludvig Engel designed the Stone of the Empress in their honour. The monument was unveiled in 1835.

In 1823, Count Arseny Zakrevsky was made Governor-General of Finland and quickly became unpopular among both Finns and Swedes alike. Zakrevsky abolished the Committee for Finnish Affairs and managed to obtain the right to submit Finnish affairs to the Russian emperor, bypassing the Finnish Secretary of State. Two years later, Alexander I died (1 December [O.S. 19 November] 1825). Zakrevsky seized the opportunity to require Finland to swear an oath of fealty which would refer to the emperor as the absolute ruler of Finland – expecting that emperor would be Constantine, Alexander's next-eldest brother. However, Nicholas, younger brother of Constantine and Alexander, became emperor despite the Decembrist revolt against him in December 1825. Nicholas assured Finland's secretary of state, Robert Henrik Rehbinder, that he (Nicholas) would continue to uphold Alexander's liberal policies regarding Finland.

In 1830, Europe became a hotbed of revolution and reform as a result of the July Revolution in France. Poland, another Russian client state, saw a massive uprising against Saint Petersburg during the November Uprising of 1830–1831. Finland made no such move, as Russia had already won over Finnish loyalty. Thus, Russia continued its policies respecting Finnish autonomy and the quiet assimilation of the Finns into the empire. Zakrevsky died in 1831; Knyaz Alexander Sergeyevich Menshikov succeeded him as Governor-General of Finland and continued Finnish appeasement.

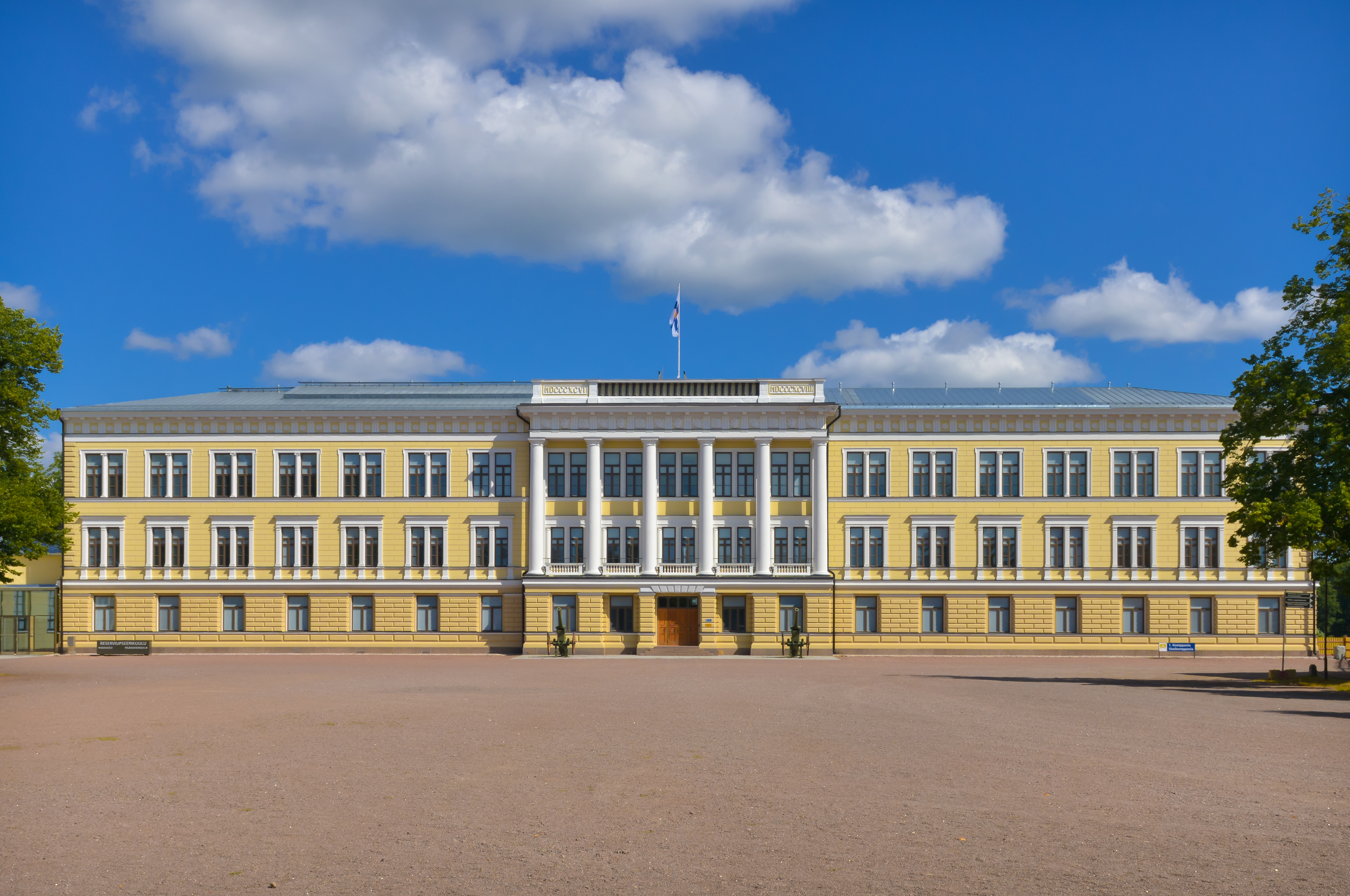
The Hamina Cadet School.

However, Finland did experience a nationalistic revolution in the 1830s – one based around literature. This marked the beginning of the Fennoman movement, a nationalistic movement that would operate in Finland until its independence. In 1831, the Finnish Literature Society was founded, which formed on the basis of appreciation of the Finnish language. Finnish was not represented as language of the scholarly elite, as most printed academic works, novels, and poetry was written in either Swedish or Russian. Copying the German reading craze, Lesewut, and subsequent Swedish mania, Finland entered the reading craze by the 1830s. This fad peaked in 1835 with the publication of The Kalevala, the Finnish epic. The Kalevala's influence on Finland was massive, and strengthened Finnish nationalism and unity. The quest for literature expanded into the 1840s and 1850s and caught the eye of the Finnish church and the Russian crown. Finnish newspapers, such as Maamiehen Ystävä (The Farmer's Friend), began publication in both urban and rural areas of Finland. However, the Swedish academic elite, the church, and the Russian government opposed Finland's literature movement. Edvard Bergenheim, Archbishop of Turku from 1850 to 1884, called for double censorship on works opposing the church and works appearing socialist or communist. The reactionary policies of the Lutheran Church convinced the also reactionary Nicholas I (r. 1825–1855) to prohibit (1850) the publishing of all Finnish works that were not religious or economic in nature, as such works would have been considered revolutionary and might encourage the Finnish majority to revolt against the church and crown. However, the censorship only fueled Finland's language strife and the Fennomanian movement.

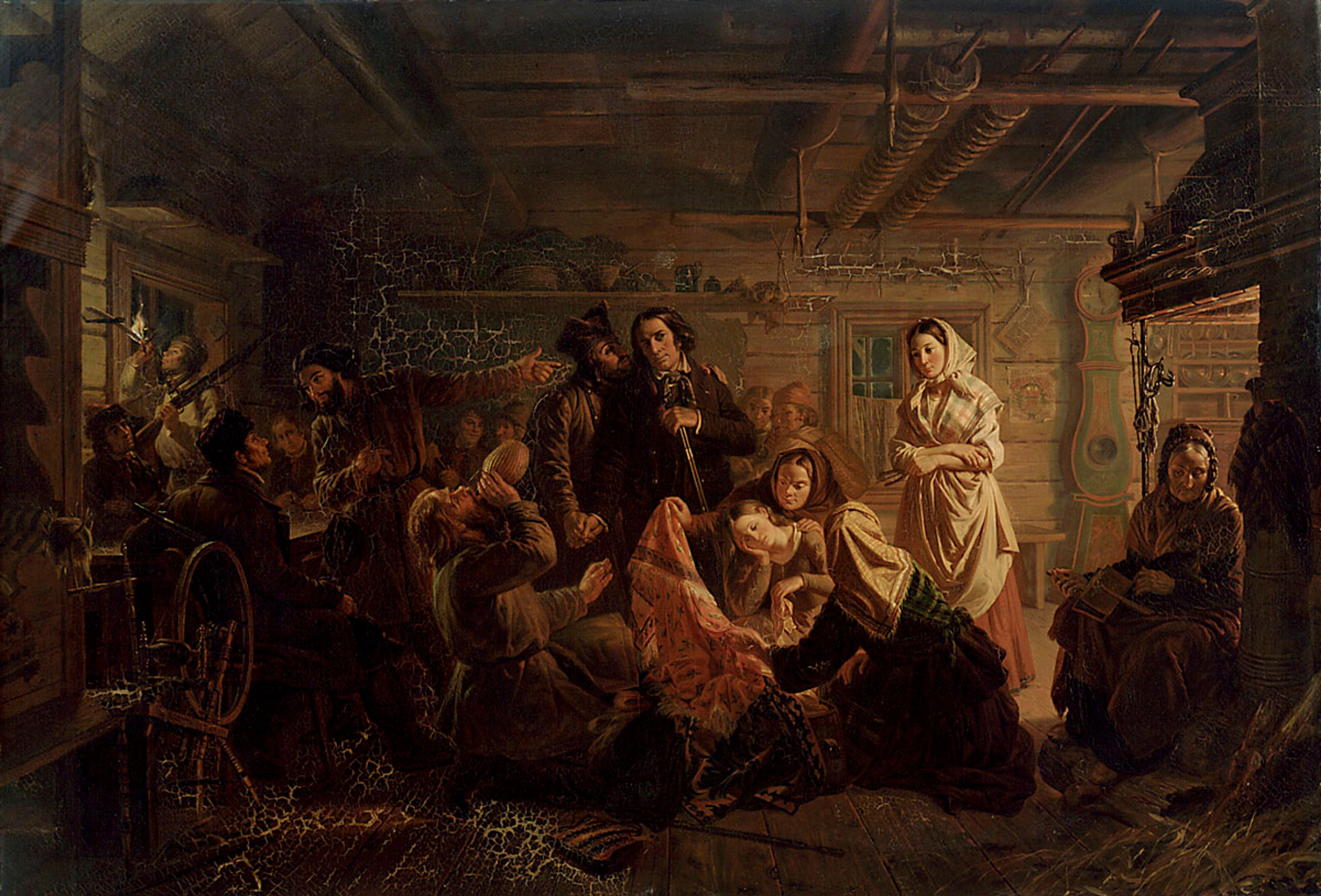
Social pastime in a Finnish countryside cabin.

=== Crimean War and 1860s–1870s ===
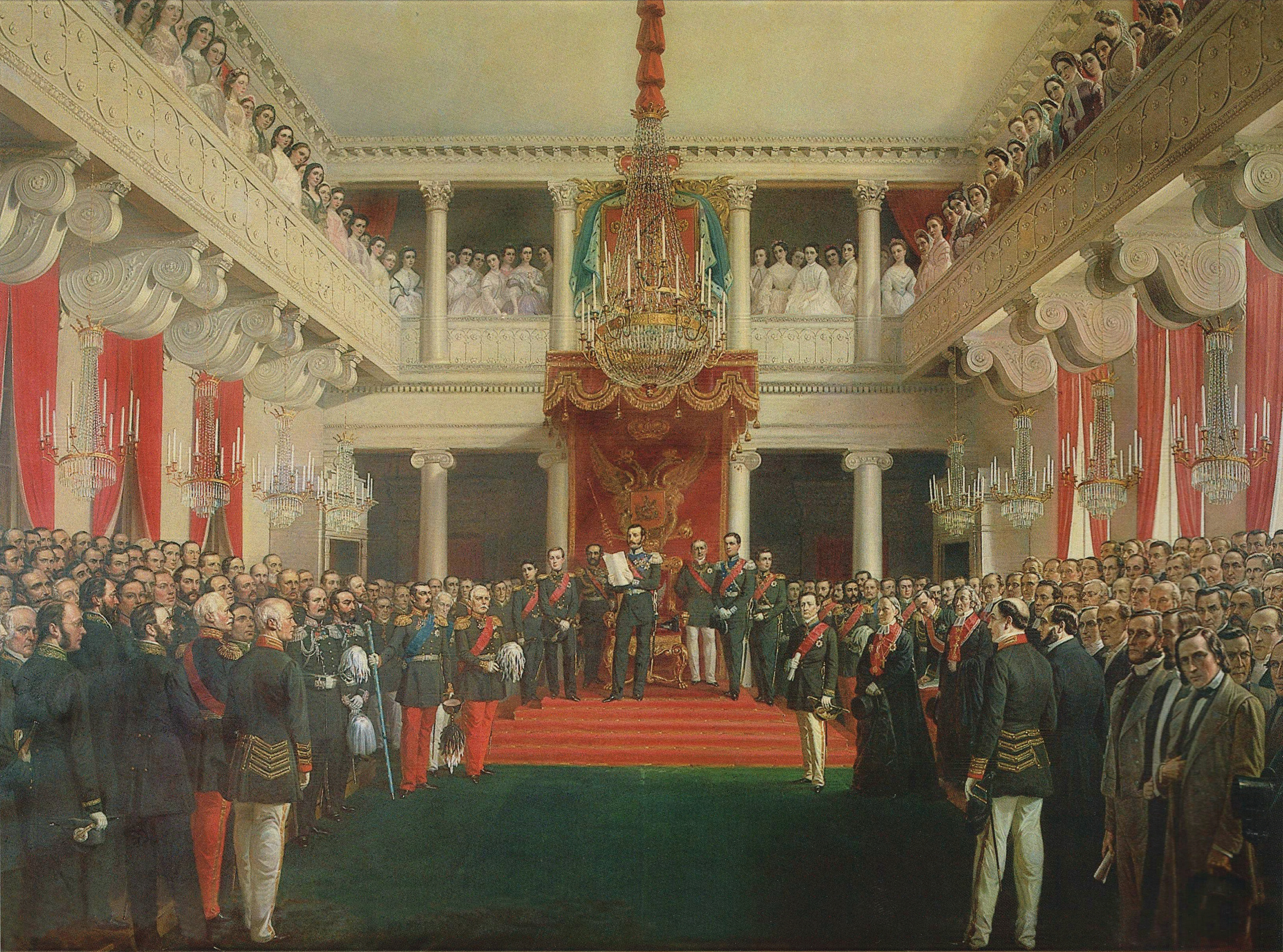
Emperor Alexander II opened the Diet of Finland at the Imperial Palace in Helsinki in 1863.

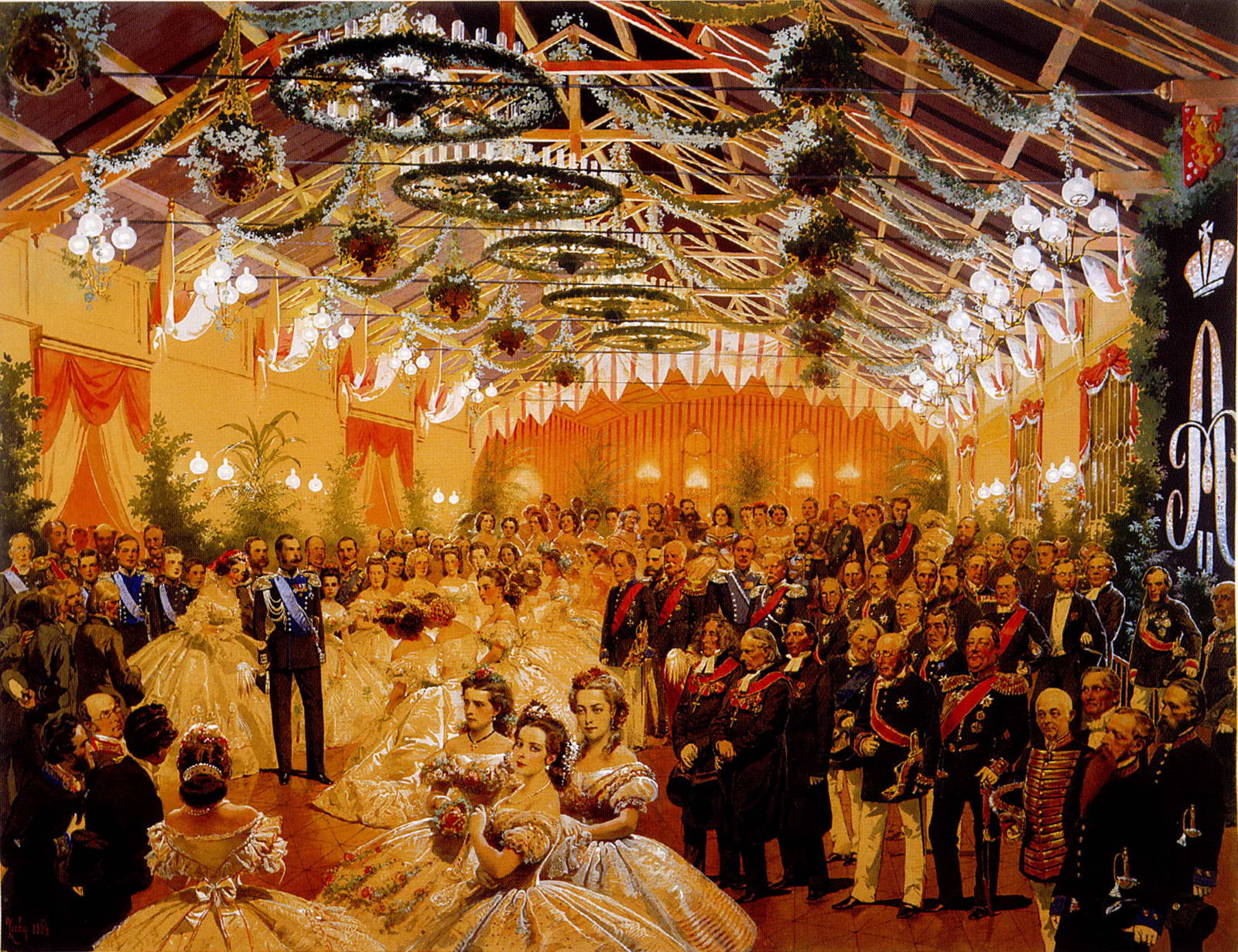
Ball in Helsinki in honour of Alexander II in 1863.

The works of Johan Snellman and other Fennoman authors combined literature and nationalism and increased the calls for language recognition and education reforms in Finland. This heightened during the Crimean War in which Finnish ports and fortresses on the Baltic Sea became subject for Allied attacks, specifically Suomenlinna and Bomarsund in Åland during the Åland War. As newspapers were printed in Swedish and Russian due to censorship, many Finns could not read about the events of the Battle of Bomarsund and the Battle of Suomenlinna. Moreover, Nicholas I died in 1855.

The new emperor, Alexander II, had already planned educational reforms in outlying territories in Russia, including Finland.

Alexander II also planned to call on the Diet of the Estates in 1863. Under Alexander's rule, Finland experienced a period of liberalization in education, the arts, and the economy.

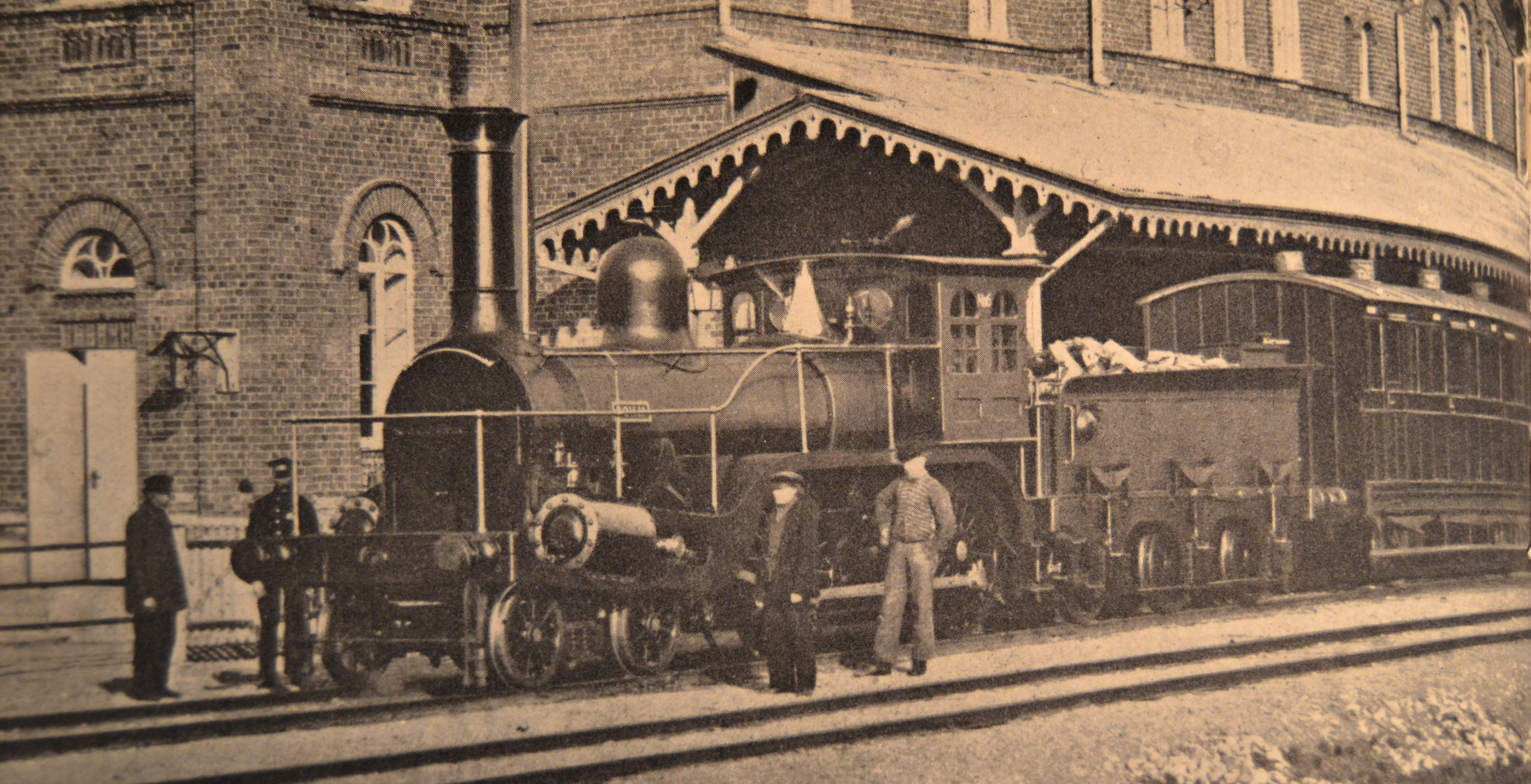
Steam locomotive at Hämeenlinna Railway Station in 1865.

There was a certain uncertainty among Finns in the 19th century as to whether the Russian Tsar Alexander II would keep his promise to convene the Diet, since Finland enjoyed autonomy and special rights that neither Poland nor "proper" Russia had, which caused tensions and fears for the future. The background was precisely the situation in Congress Poland: in 1863 there was the January Uprising, which made Russian authorities hostile to regional self-government rights. In Finland, there was concern that the unrest in Poland and the tightening Russian rule might lead to Finns also losing their privileges and autonomy - and that the Diet would no longer be convened. In Poland, the Russian army of 90,000 men were commanded by the Finnish‑born General Anders Edvard Ramsay, whose forces suppressed the uprising.

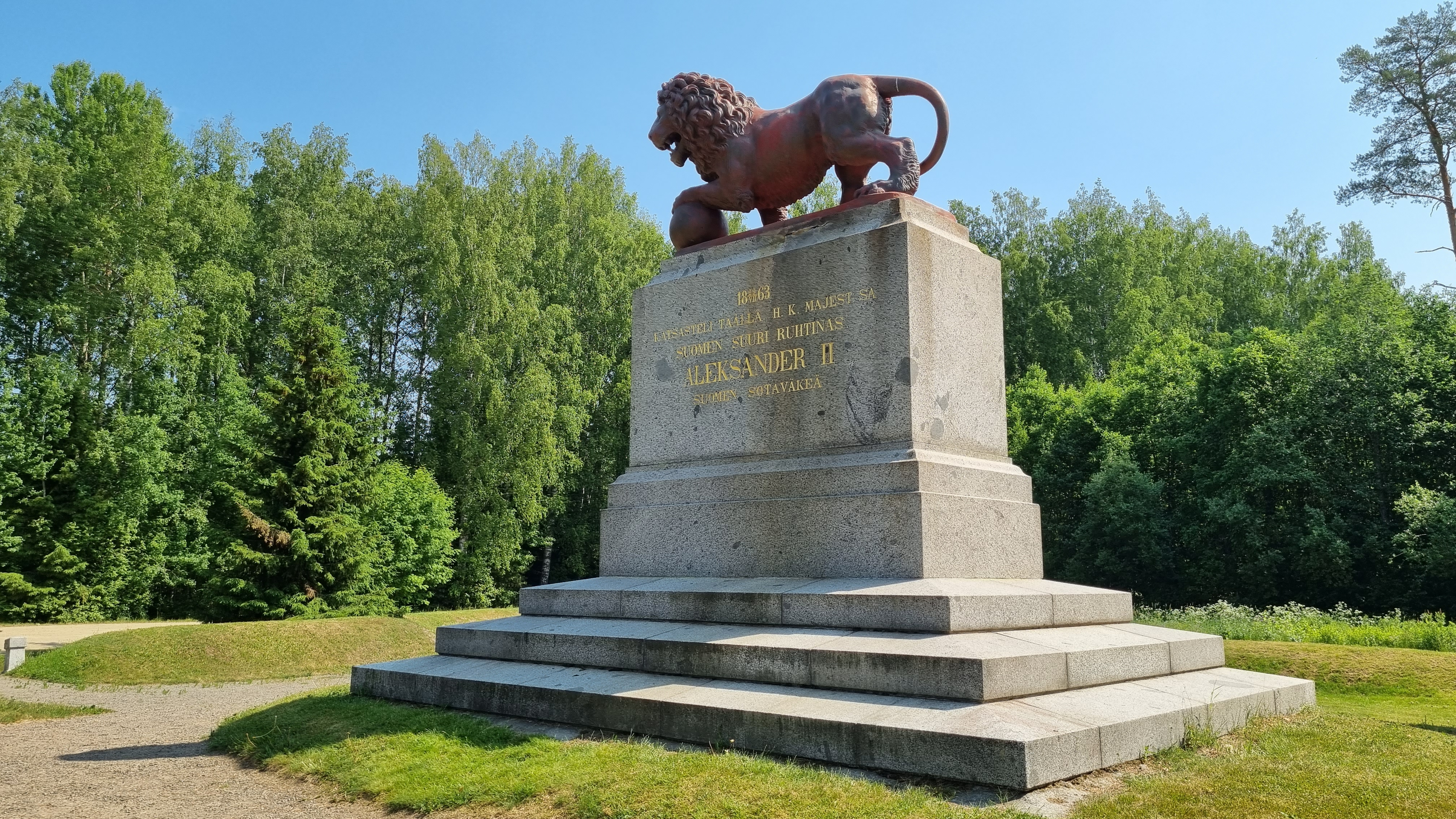
The Lion of Parola in Hattula. The statue was erected in 1868.

Alexander II signed a decree that elevated the Finnish language to equal status with Swedish on July 30, 1863. The law was expanded in 1865 to require that state offices must serve the public in Finnish if requested. Despite this, the language laws took time to be fully implemented due to the interference of the Swedish elite, who owned most of these offices and businesses.

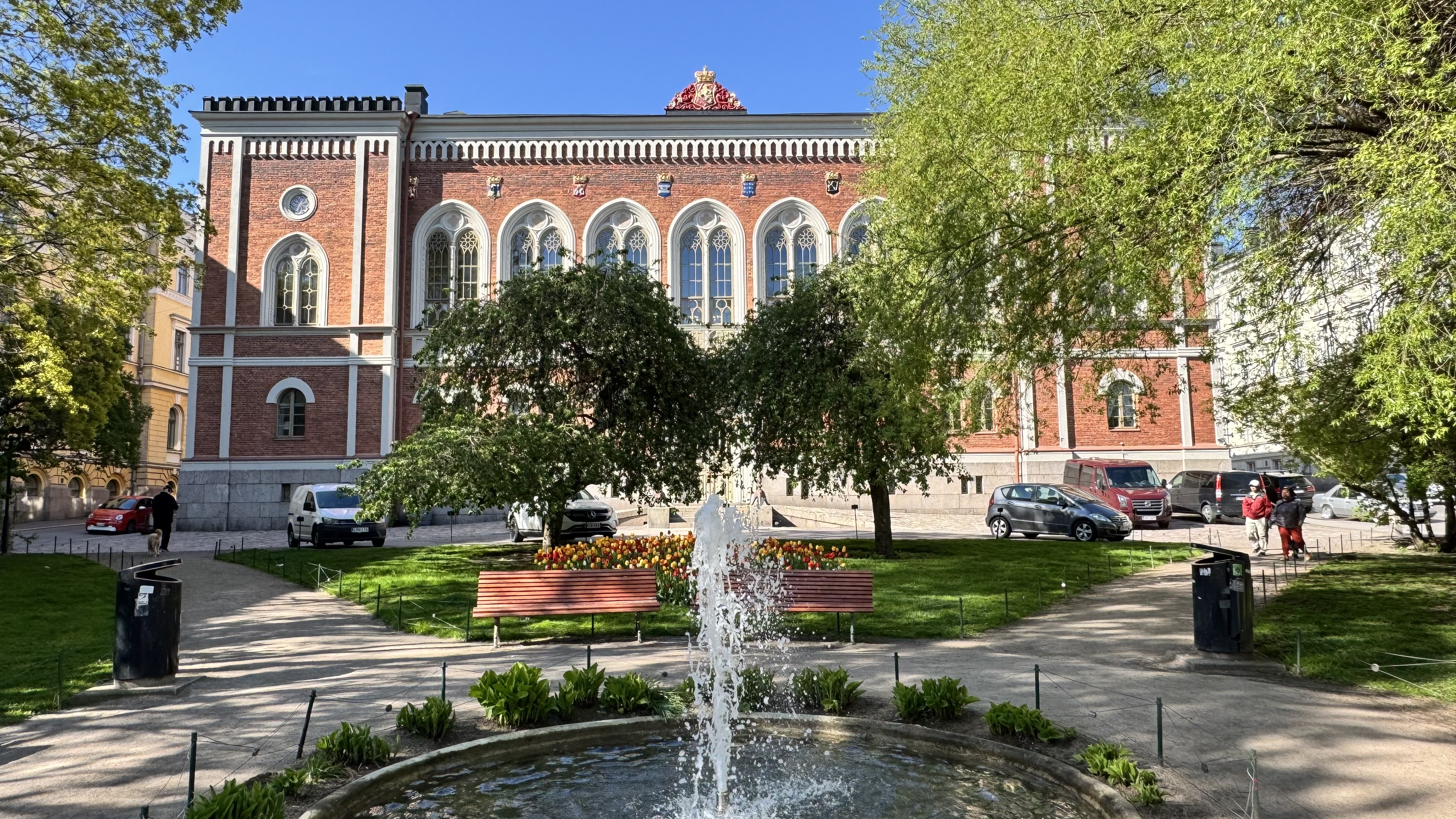
The House of Nobility in Helsinki.

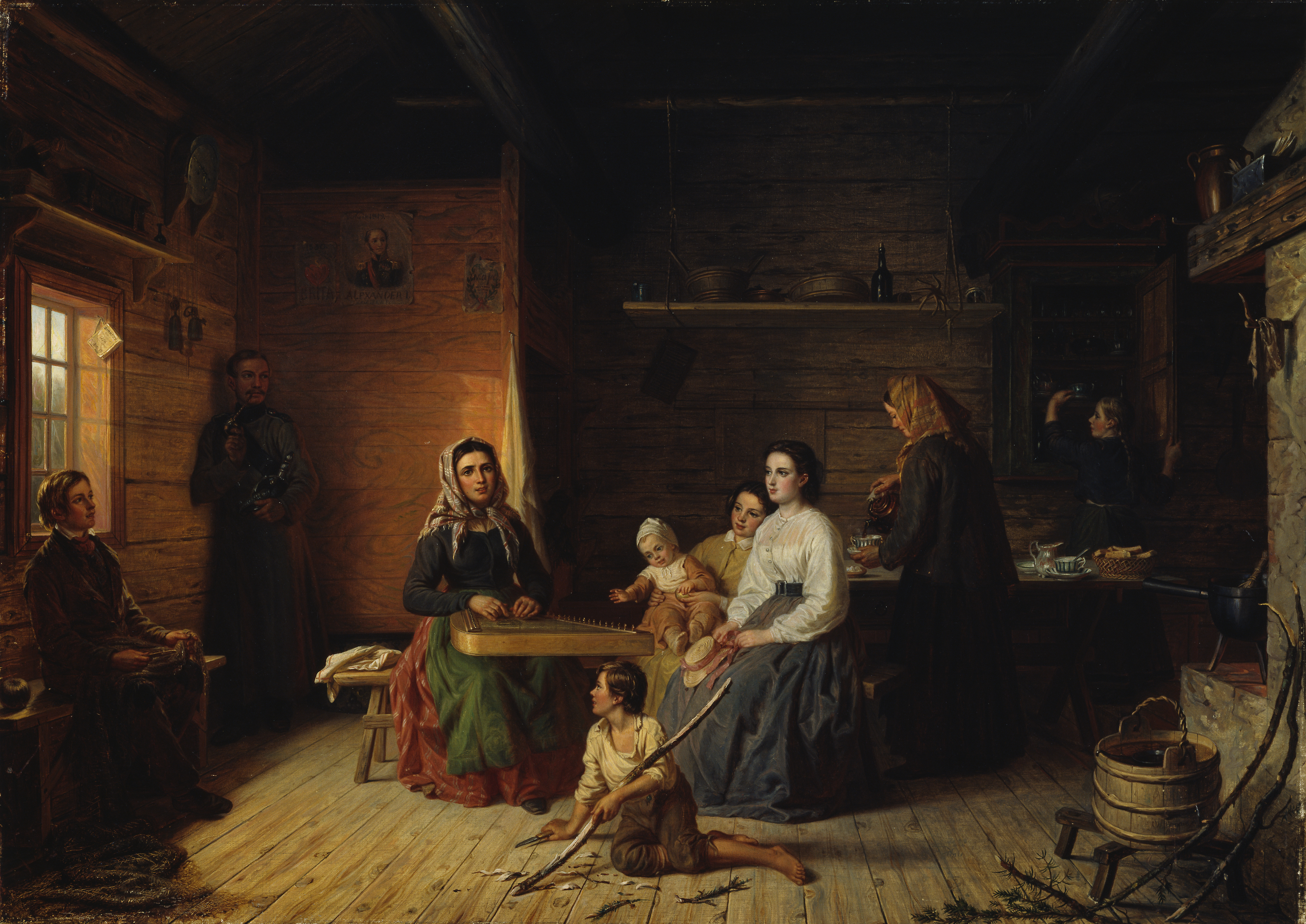
Folk musician Kreeta Haapasalo plays kantele in a Peasant Cottage (1868).

In 1863, Alexander called the Diet and passed laws regarding infrastructure and currency. Alexander came to favor the Finnish working class over the Swedish elite, due to Swedish propaganda during the Crimean War urging revolt against the Russians. The education laws pushed through and the first secondary schools instructed in Finnish began in the 1870s. The power of the Diet was also expanded in 1869, as it allowed the Diet more power and the ability to initiate various legislation; the act also called the tsar to call upon the Diet every five years. An act passed regarding religion was also passed in 1869 which prevented the power of the state over the church. Moreover, Finland also received its own monetary system, the Finnish markka, and its own army.

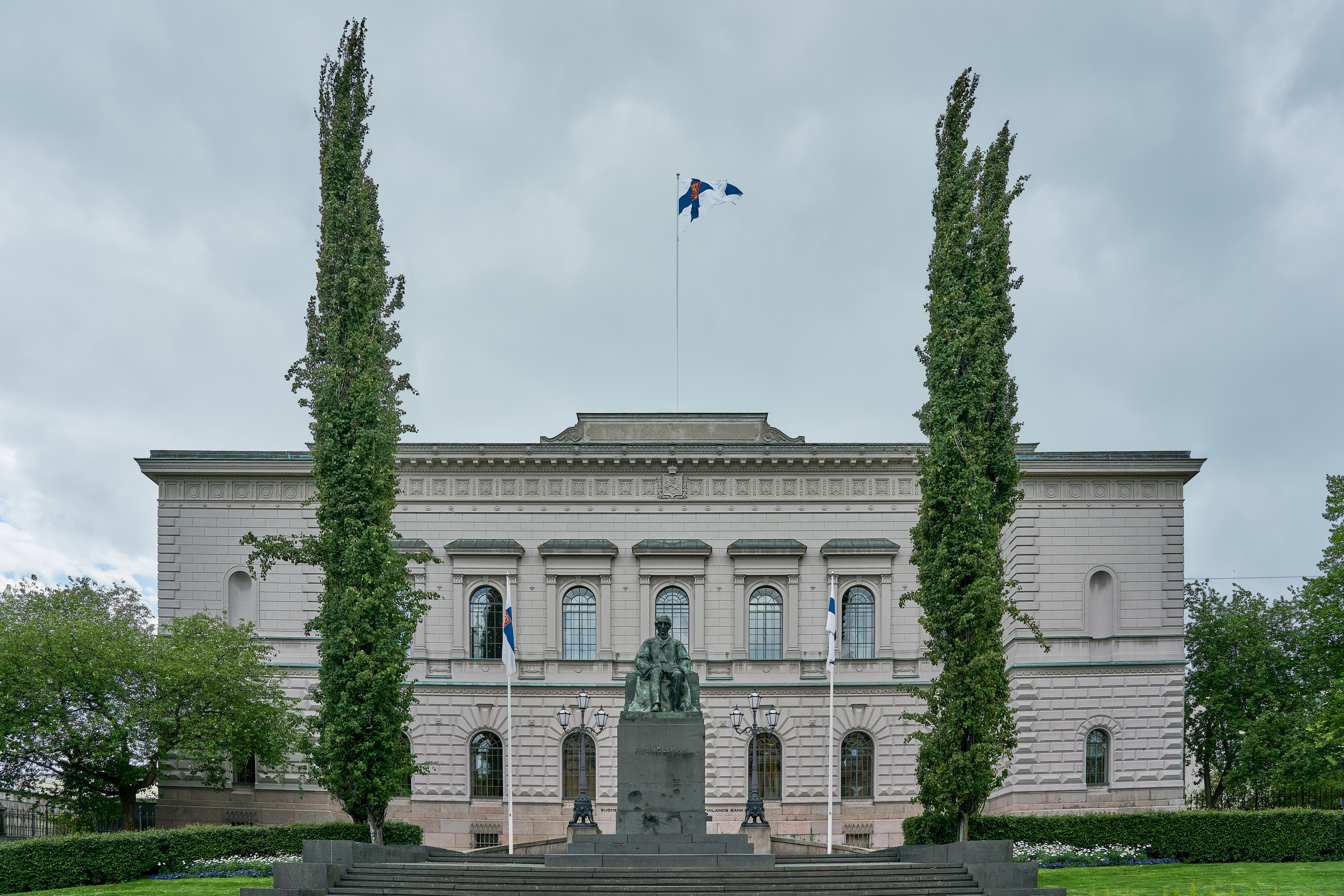
The Bank of Finland in Helsinki.

Alexander II granted permission for the founding of Handelsgillet i Helsingfors and the Finnish Club of Helsinki. The Tsar supported the construction of the Alexander Theatre and the establishment of the Finnish National Theatre.

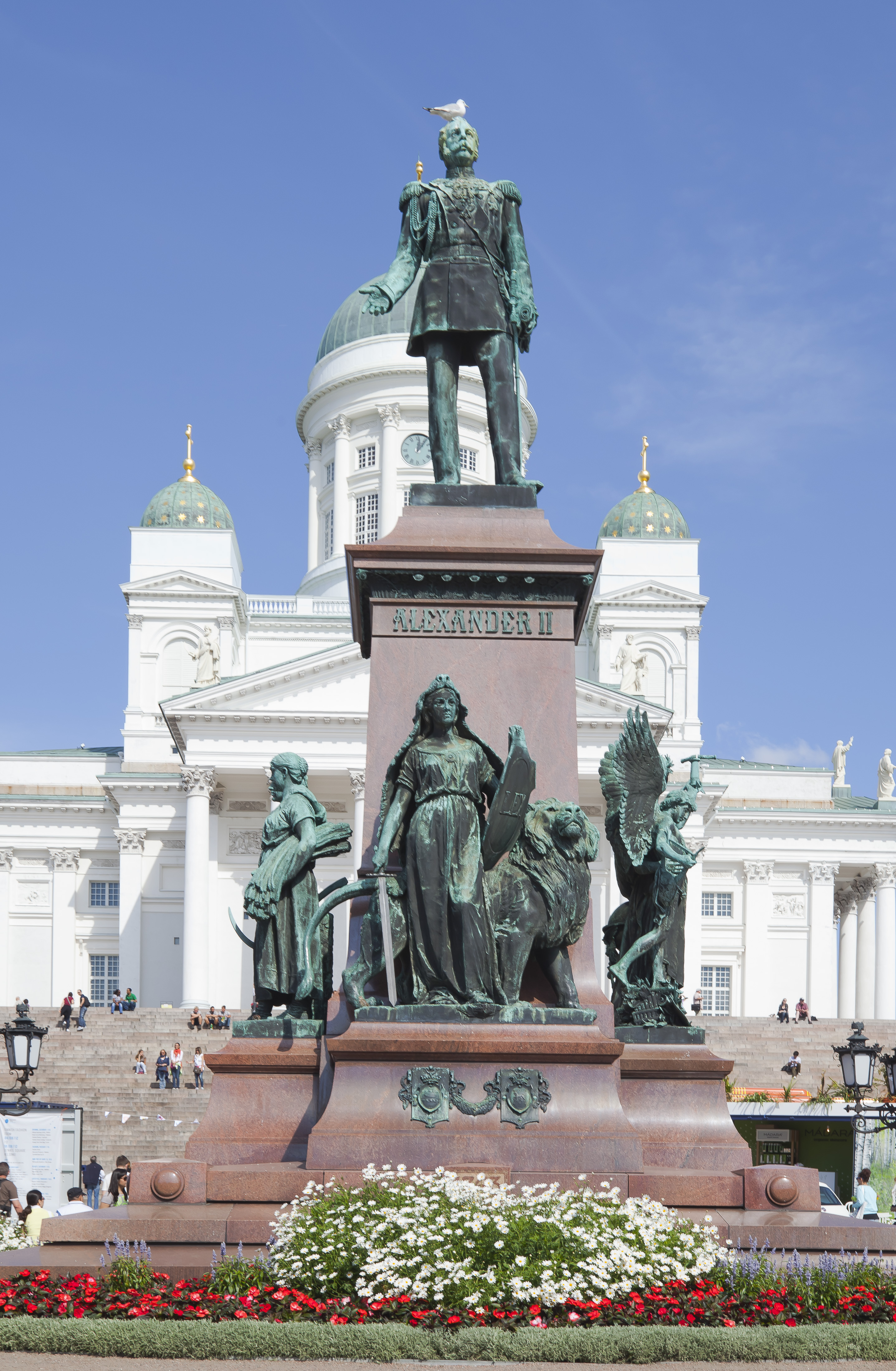
Statue of Alexander II at the Senate Square in Helsinki was built to commemorate his re-establishment of the Diet of Finland in 1863.

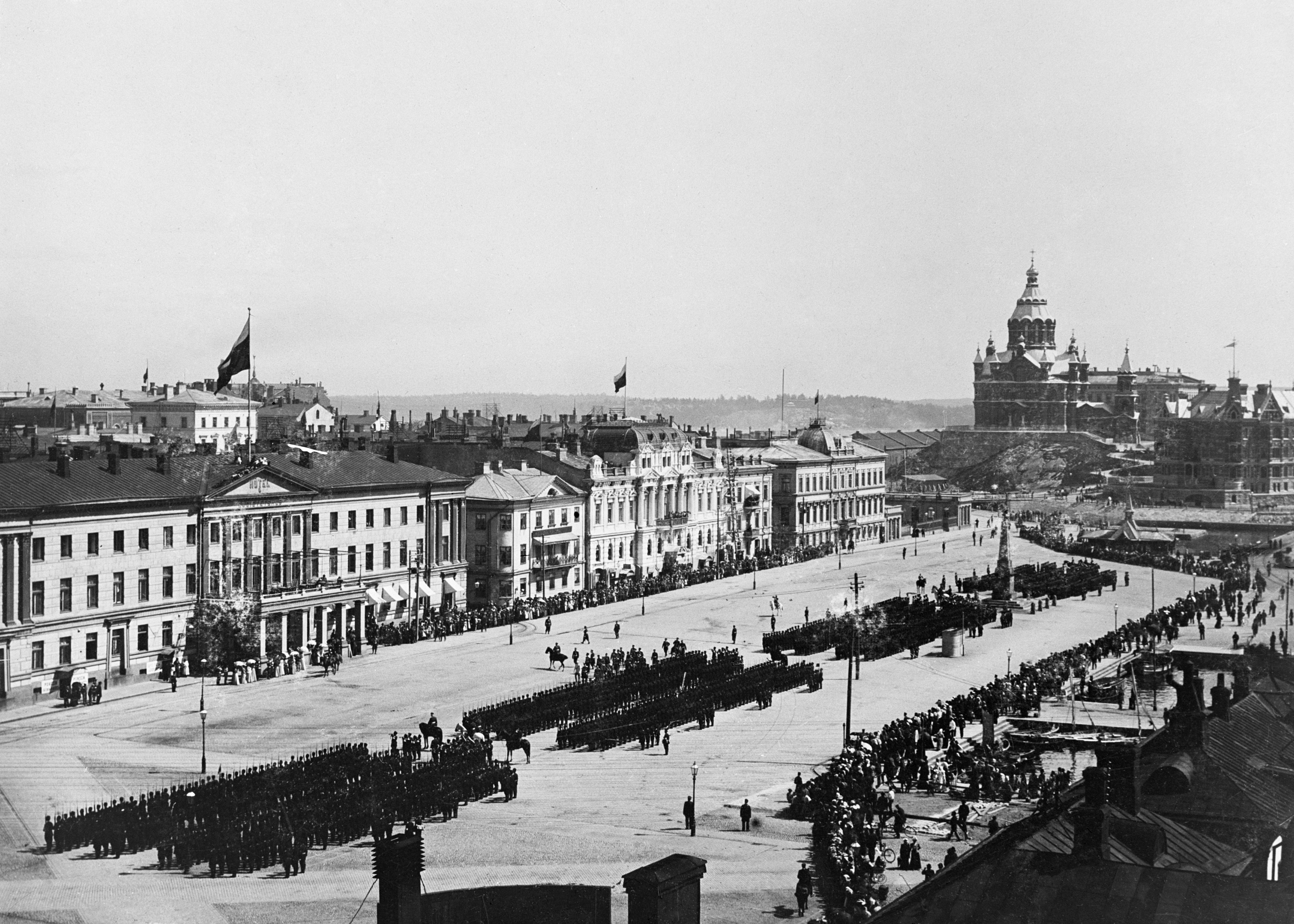
Parade in Helsinki in the 1890s.

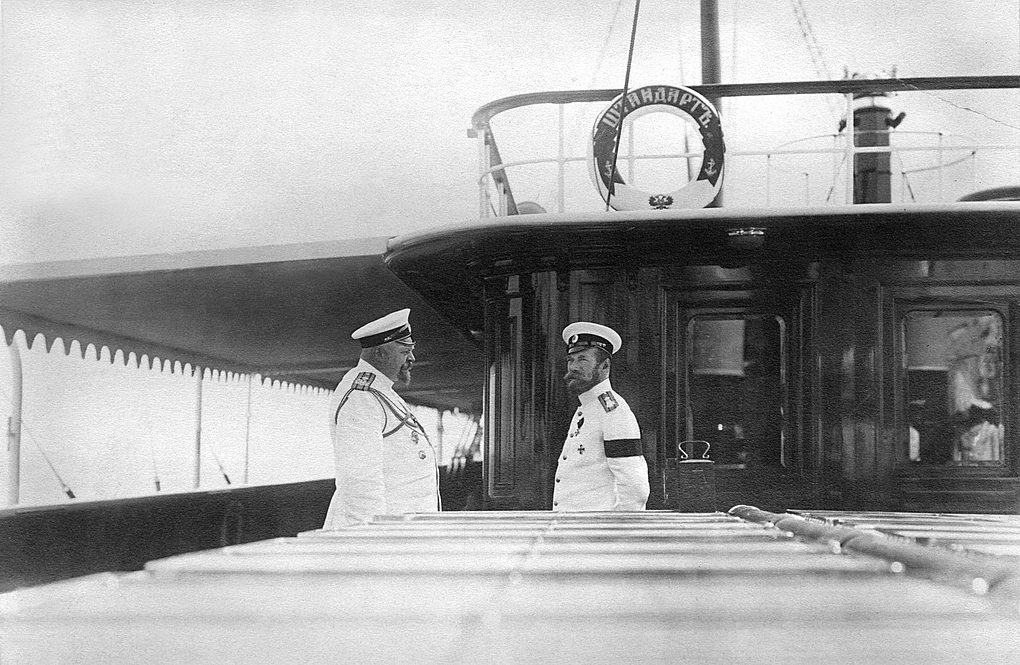
Emperor Nicholas II of Russia on the board of the Imperial Yacht Standart.

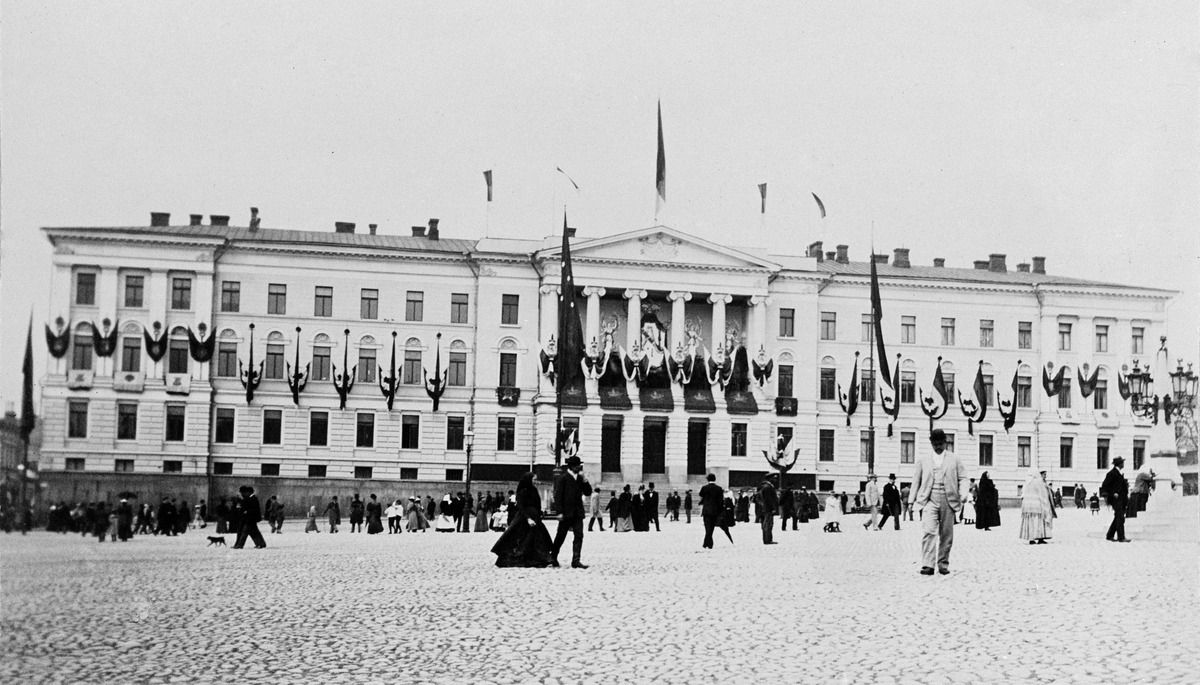
The Imperial Alexander University in Helsinki decorated during the coronation day of Nicholas II in 1896.

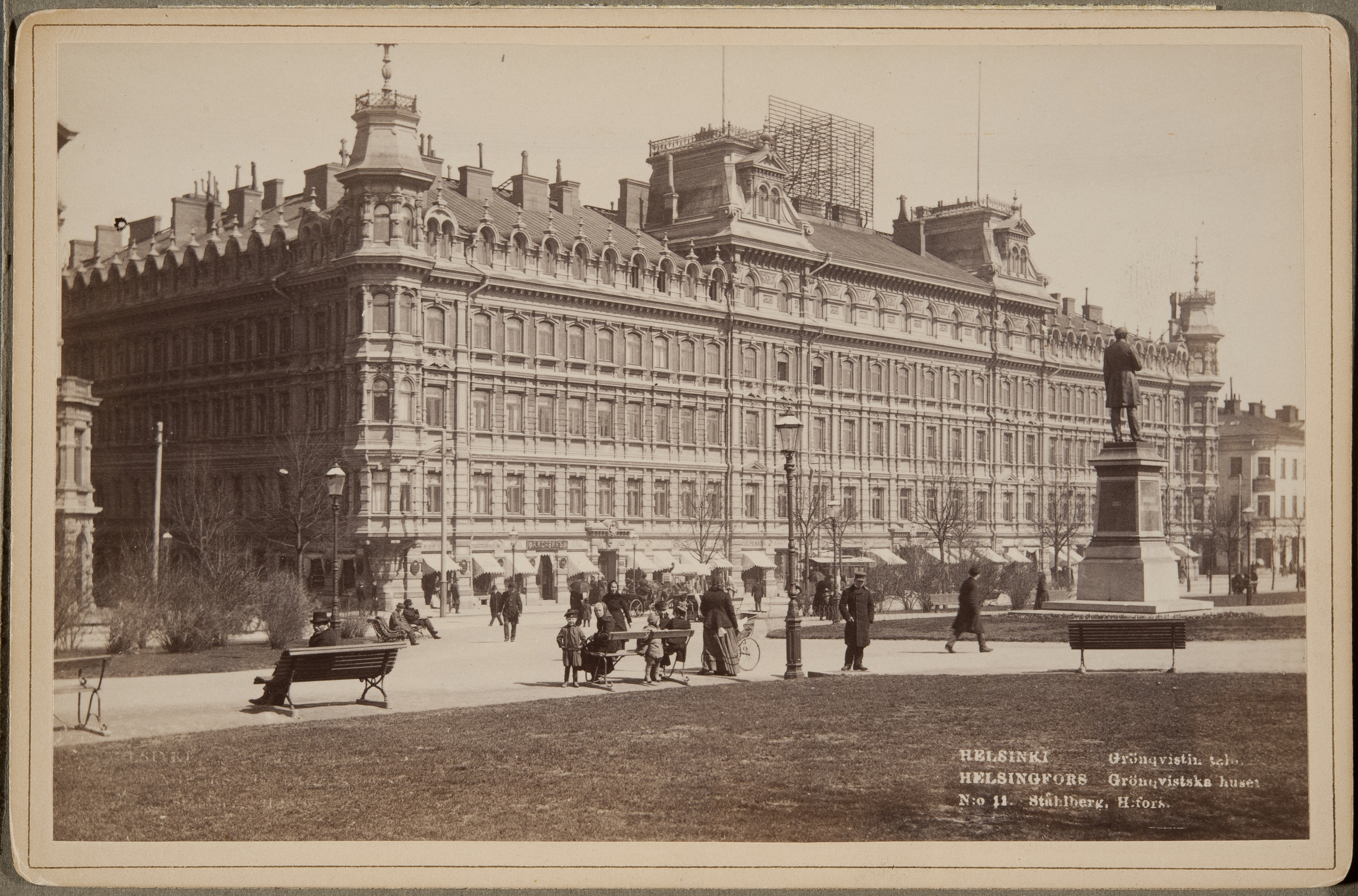
Helsinki in 1899.

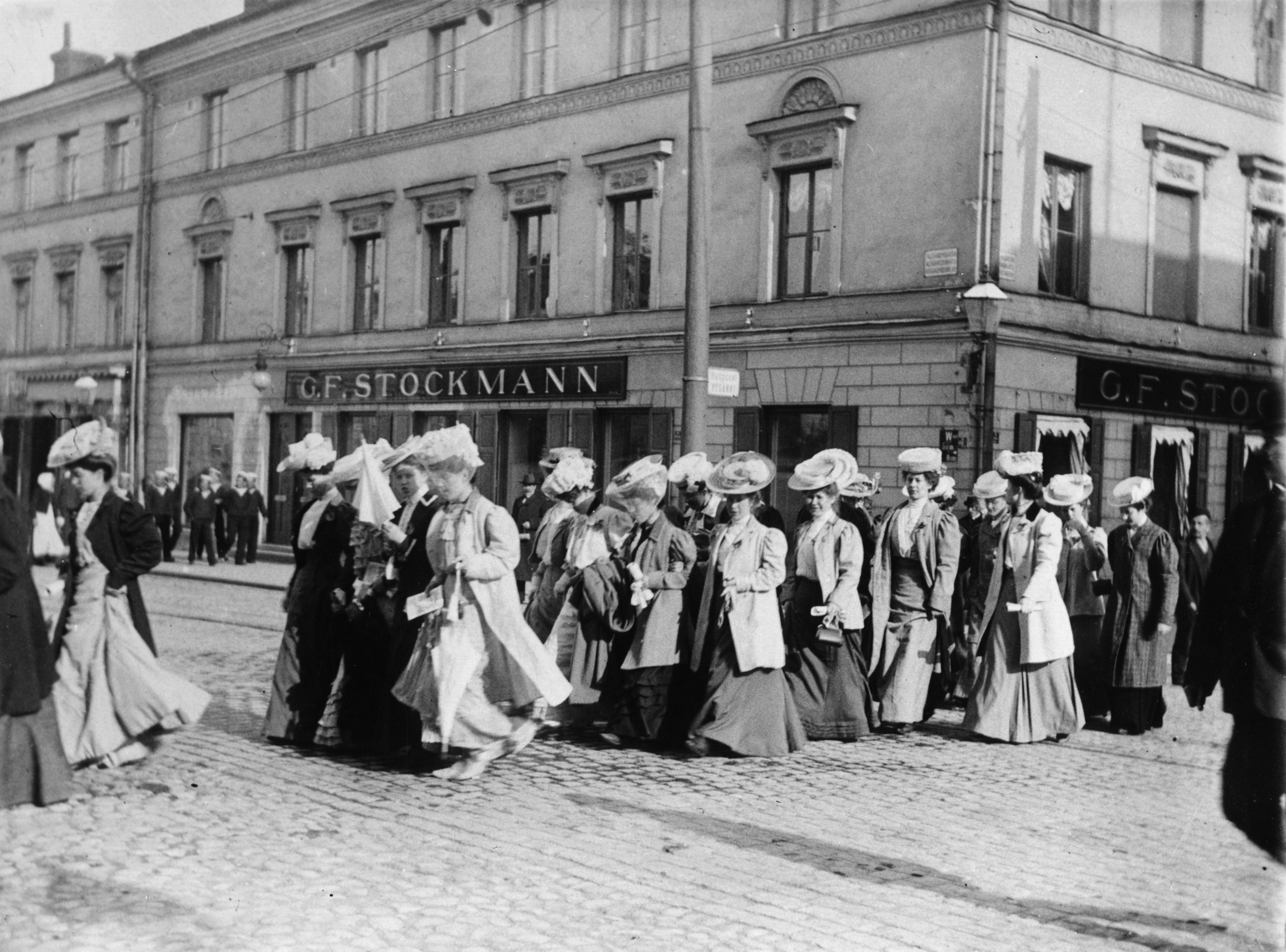
In 1905, a women's protest march, possibly in support of suffrage.

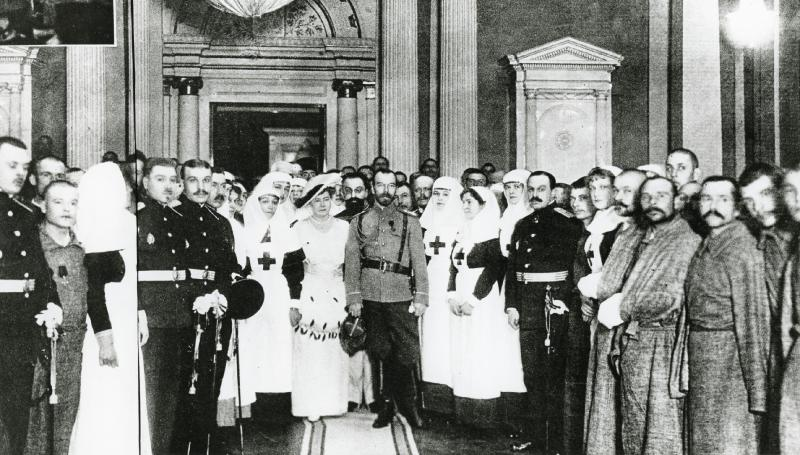
Tsar Nicholas II at the Imperial Palace in Helsinki during the World War I in 1915.

=== Russification: 1881-1905 ===
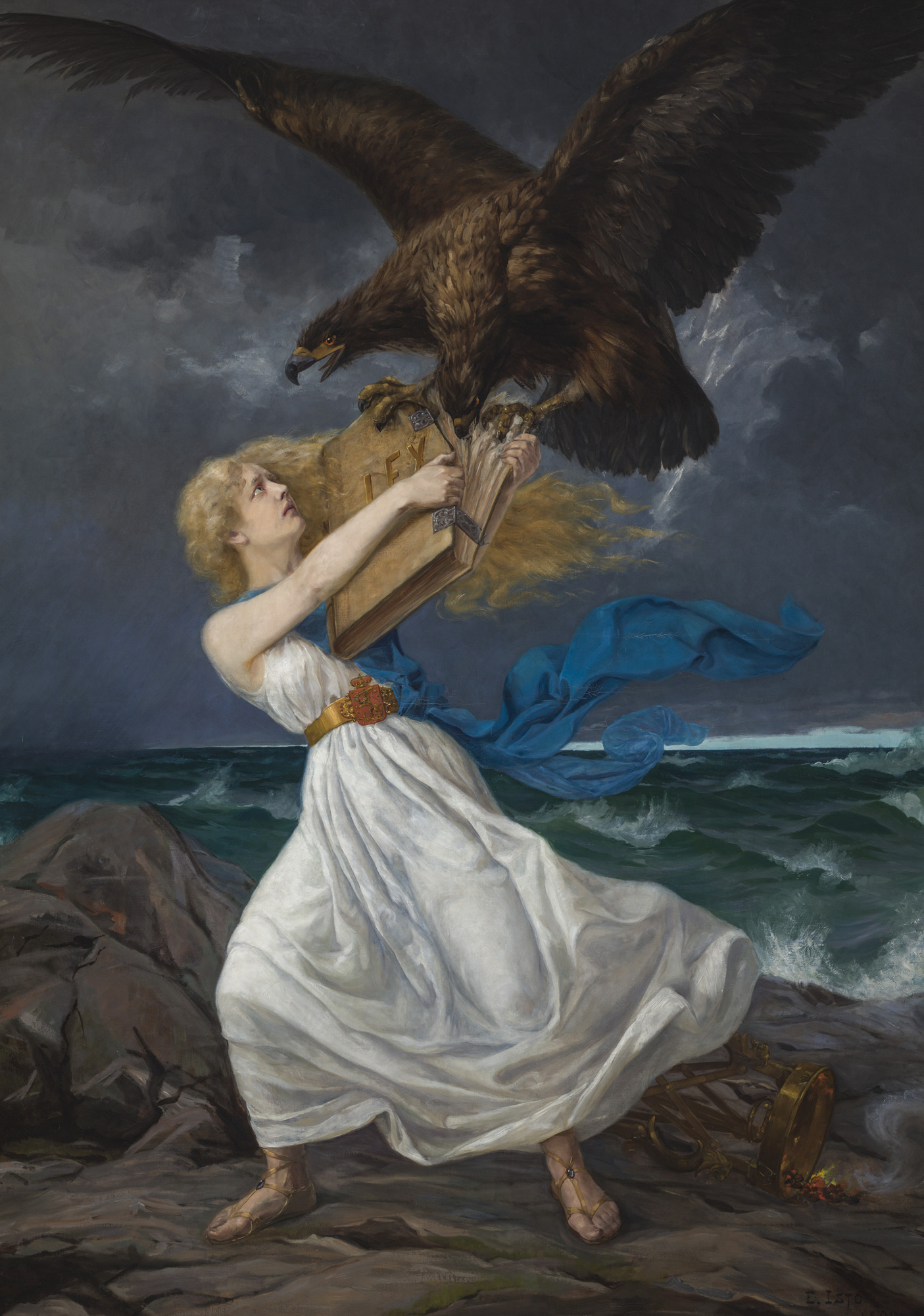
The Attack by Edward Isto.

The policies of Russification under Alexander III and Nicholas II easily sum up the time period from 1881 to 1917. In 1881, Alexander III took the throne after the death of his father and began a period of staunchly conservative, yet peaceful, rule of Russia. Finland, as well as many other outlying Russian territories, faced the burden of Russification, the cultural, social, economical, and political absorption into Russia. Compared to the early Russification of the 1830s and 1840s, the Russification of the late 19th-early 20th century was much more vigorous in its policies. Moreover, Finland faced political turmoil within its nation between various factions such as liberals, Social Democrats, Young Finns, and communists. Finland became a target for the pan-Slavist movement, which called for Slavic unity in eastern Europe. Finland was viewed as conquered territory, and that as subjects, Finland was to respect the tsar. Finland was also viewed as a land of settlement and that the "alien race" of the Finns were to be assimilated and protected from Western interference, thereby "blessing" the Finns with their presence. Moreover, Finnish representatives to the tsar were replaced with pan-Slavist advocates.

Russification only increased from there, but from the 1880s on, the conflict between the Swedish minority halted. Compared to the Baltic states, the Finnish majority was far better educated and more keen in Russian politics. The reactionary policies of Russification, which aimed to combine secular nationalism and a divine right monarchy, infiltrated the Finnish economy in 1885. Finland had managed to create a thriving modern industry based around textiles and timber that managed to rival the Russian economy at the time. Russian bureaucrats, out of both shock and envy, called for the revision of the Russo-Finnish Tariff. Russification had taken an economic turn as well, as the basis of the reformed tariff was economic uniformity, which only furthered economic difficulties of Finland. The tariff's revision in 1885, and subsequently 1897, was formed out of spite of Finland's commercial success and working-class unity. Russification policies continued into 1890, with the addition of the Imperial Post System in Finland, replacing the Finnish post. It was not until the mid-1890s, that the Finnish people realized the true intentions of the Russian crown.

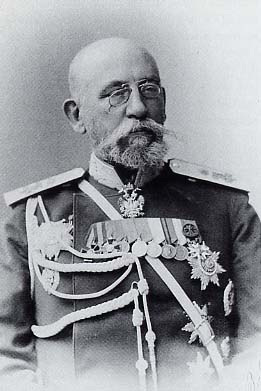
Governor-General of Finland Nikolay Bobrikov.

Nicholas II ascended the throne in 1894 after Alexander's death, and with him came General Nikolay Bobrikov, who was appointed governor-general. Under Bobrikov, the Finns had a near collective hatred of him, whose reactionary policies gave rise to socialism and communism among the Finnish working class. The Party of Active Resistance and Kagal, in particular, became very popular in Finland for the former's tactics of violence and the latter's tactic of propaganda and persuasion. At the beginning of this reign, Bobrikov almost immediately introduced a mandatory five-year military service, in which Finns had the possibility of being drafted into Russian units. Furthermore, he instituted that Russians be given the opportunity to serve in public office and that Russian be made the administrative language of Finland. In 1899, the February Manifesto under Nicholas II declared that Russian law was the law of the land, and Finland was to pledge allegiance to Russian law. The Diet was essentially downgraded to a state assembly and that Finland was a province of Russia, ignoring its autonomy. The Finnish Army as a whole was dissolved in 1901.

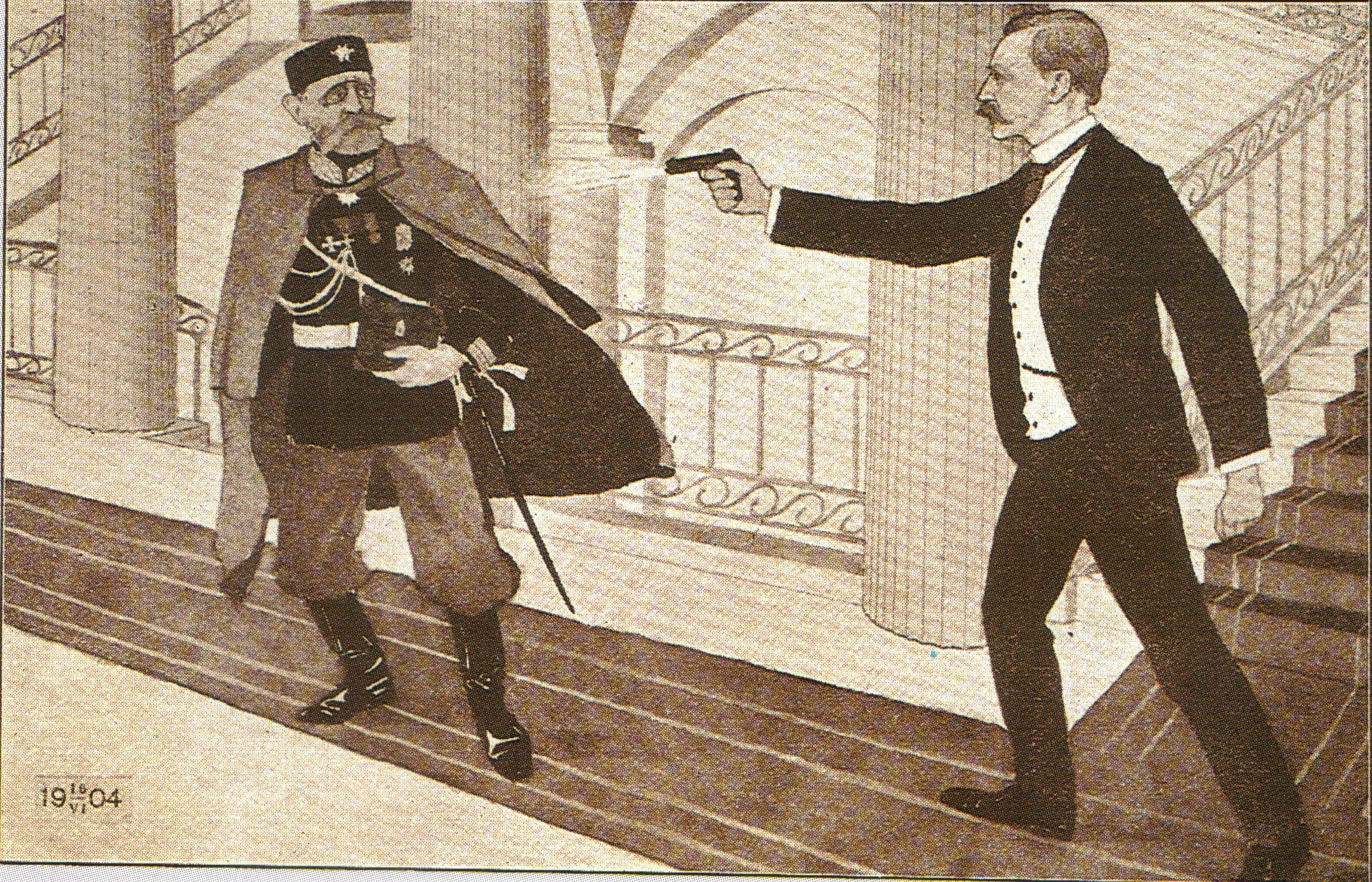
Governor-General Bobrikov assassinated by Eugen Schauman on 16 June 1904, in Helsinki. A drawing of the assassination by an unknown author.

Bobrikov unintentionally united both Finns and Swedes against Russia, which only angered him more. With churches refusing to proclaim the law, judges refusing to carry it out, and conscripts refusing service, Bobrikov went on a frenzy with the current state of Finland. Bobrikov found little support in Finland, mainly from the Russian minority and members of the Old Finnish Party. Bobrikov brought in Russian officials to take government and state spots and, in an extreme act of anger, suspended the Finnish Constitution in 1903. His actions were met with extreme anger from Finns and Swedes, in which the moderate parties, the Young Finns and the Swedish Party combined to collectively fight Bobrikov. The Social Democratic Party of Finland, a left-wing party popular among peasants was also extremely hostile and advocated armed resistance. Finally, the Party of Active Resistance, a nationalist party that advocated an armed struggle and guerilla tactics, received fame when member Eugen Schauman assassinated Bobrikov in Helsinki on 16 June 1904.

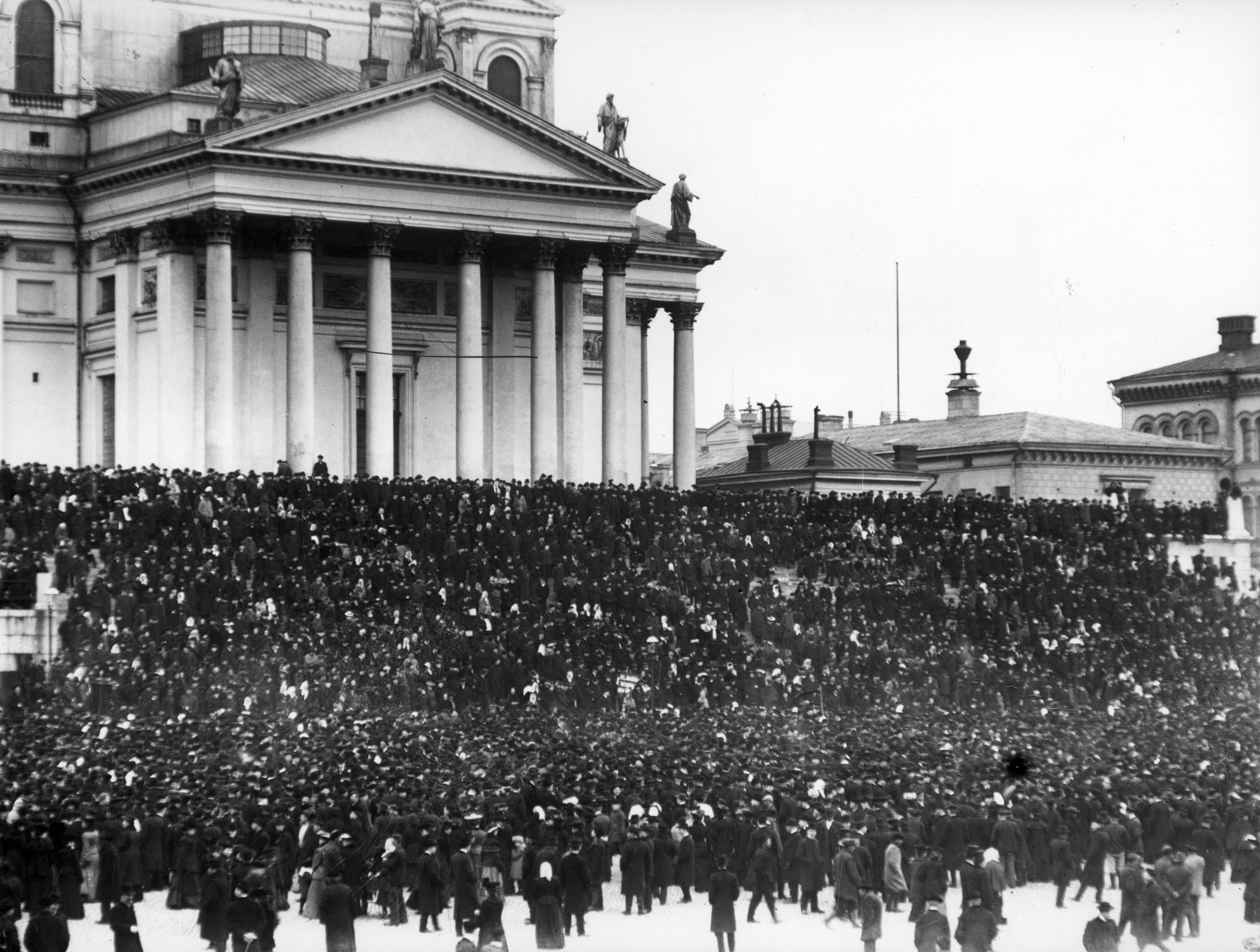
General strike in Helsinki in 1905.

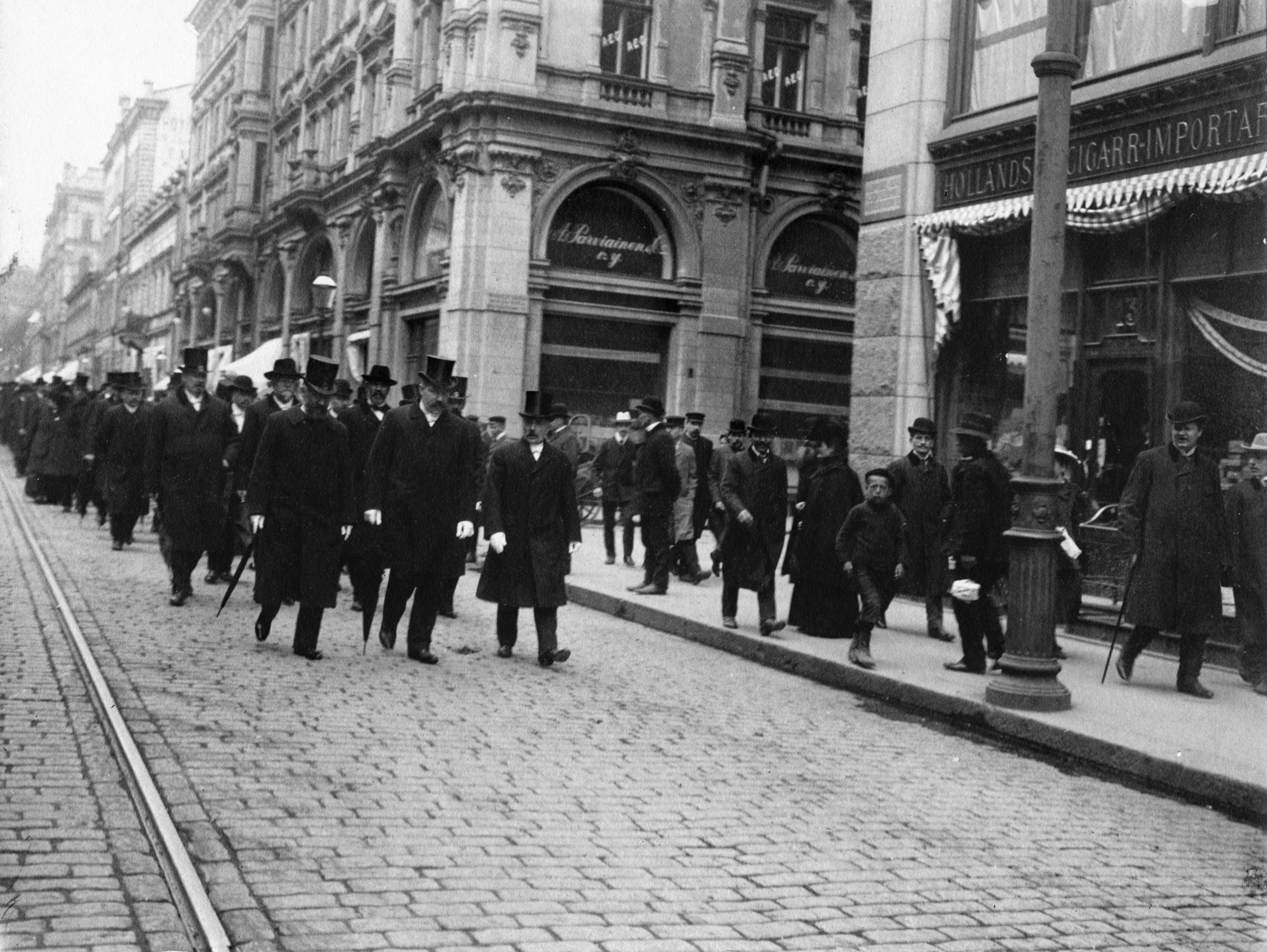
Helsinki in 1907

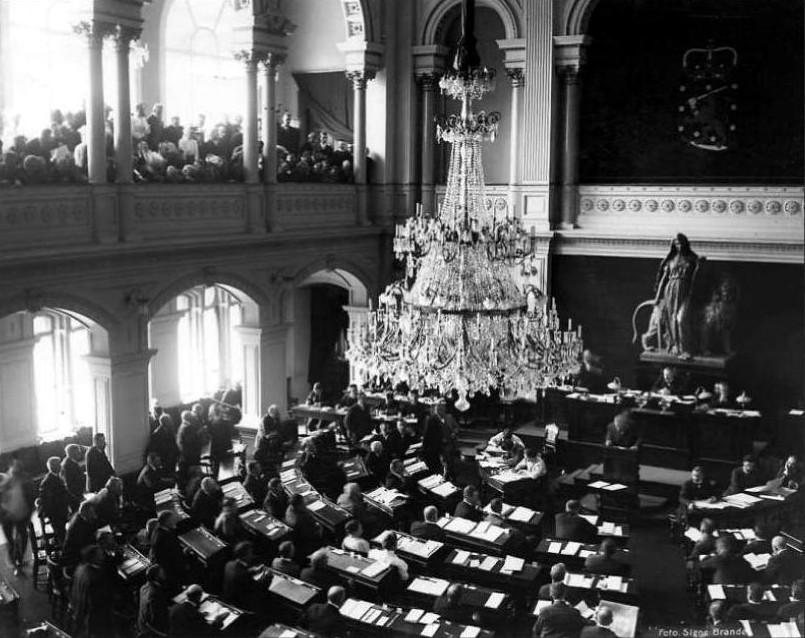
The first session of the Parliament of Finland in 1907

=== Reforms post-Revolution of 1905 ===
In 1905, Russia faced a humiliating defeat in the Russo-Japanese War and amidst the turmoil in St. Petersburg, Finns remade their constitution and formed a new parliament whose representation was based on universal suffrage, giving women full suffrage before any other European nation after the short-lived Republic of Corsica. However, the parliament was quickly destroyed by Pyotr Stolypin, Nicholas II's prime minister. Stolypin proved to be even more vigorous than Bobrikov, as he believed every subject should be a stoic patriot to the crown and uphold undying loyalty to Russia. Stolypin wished to destroy Finland's autonomy and disregarded native tongues and cultures of non-Russian subjects, believing them to be traditional and ritualistic at best. The Finnish parliament once again formed to combat Stolypin, but Stolypin was bent on quashing Finnish insurrection and permanently disbanded the parliament in 1909. As with Bobrikov before him, Stolypin was unaware that such actions only fanned the flames and was subsequently assassinated by Dmitry Bogrov, a Jewish member of the far-left. From Stolypin's death henceforward, the Russian crown ruled Finland as a monarchist dictatorship until Russia's collapse during the Russian Revolution, from which Finland declared independence, a war of independence that soon transformed into a civil war.

== Government and politics ==
The Russian emperor ruled as the Grand Duke of Finland and was represented in Finland by the Governor-General. The Senate of Finland was the highest governing body of the Grand Duchy and was composed of native Finns. In Saint Petersburg, Finnish matters were represented by the Minister–Secretary of State for Finland. The Senate had a primarily advisory role until it got the right to representation in 1886. On top of having its own central, regional and local administration, Finland had its own stamps, currency and army.

Alexander I did not want the Grand Duchy to be a constitutional monarchy but the governmental institutions born during the Swedish rule offered him a more efficient form of government than the absolute monarchy in Russia. This evolved into a high level of autonomy by the end of the 19th century.

There were twenty Governors-General from the Finnish War until independence:

- General Count Göran Magnus Sprengtporten 1808–1809
- General Knyaz Michael Andreas Barclay de Tolly 1809–1810
- General Count Fabian Steinheil 1810–1823
- Count Gustav Mauritz Armfelt 1812–1813
- General Count Arseny Zakrevsky 1823–1831
- Admiral Aleksander Menshikov 1831–1855
- General Friedrich Wilhelm Rembert Graf von Berg 1855–1861
- General Baron Platon Rokassovsky 1854–1855, 1861–1866
- General Johan Mauritz Nordenstam 1861, 1864, 1868, 1870, 1872–1873
- General Count Nikolai Adlerberg 1866–1881
- General Count Fyodor Logginovich van Heiden 1881–1897
- General-Lieutenant Stepan Goncharov 1897–1898
- General Nikolai Bobrikov 1898–1904
- General-Lieutenant Knyaz Ivan Obolenski 1904–1905
- Privy Councillor Nikolai Gerard 1905–1908
- General Vladimir von Boeckmann 1908–1909
- General-Lieutenant Franz Albert Seyn 1909–1917
- Privy Councilor Adam Lipski 1917
- Mikhail Stakhovich 1917
- Nikolai Nekrasov 1917

=== Provinces ===
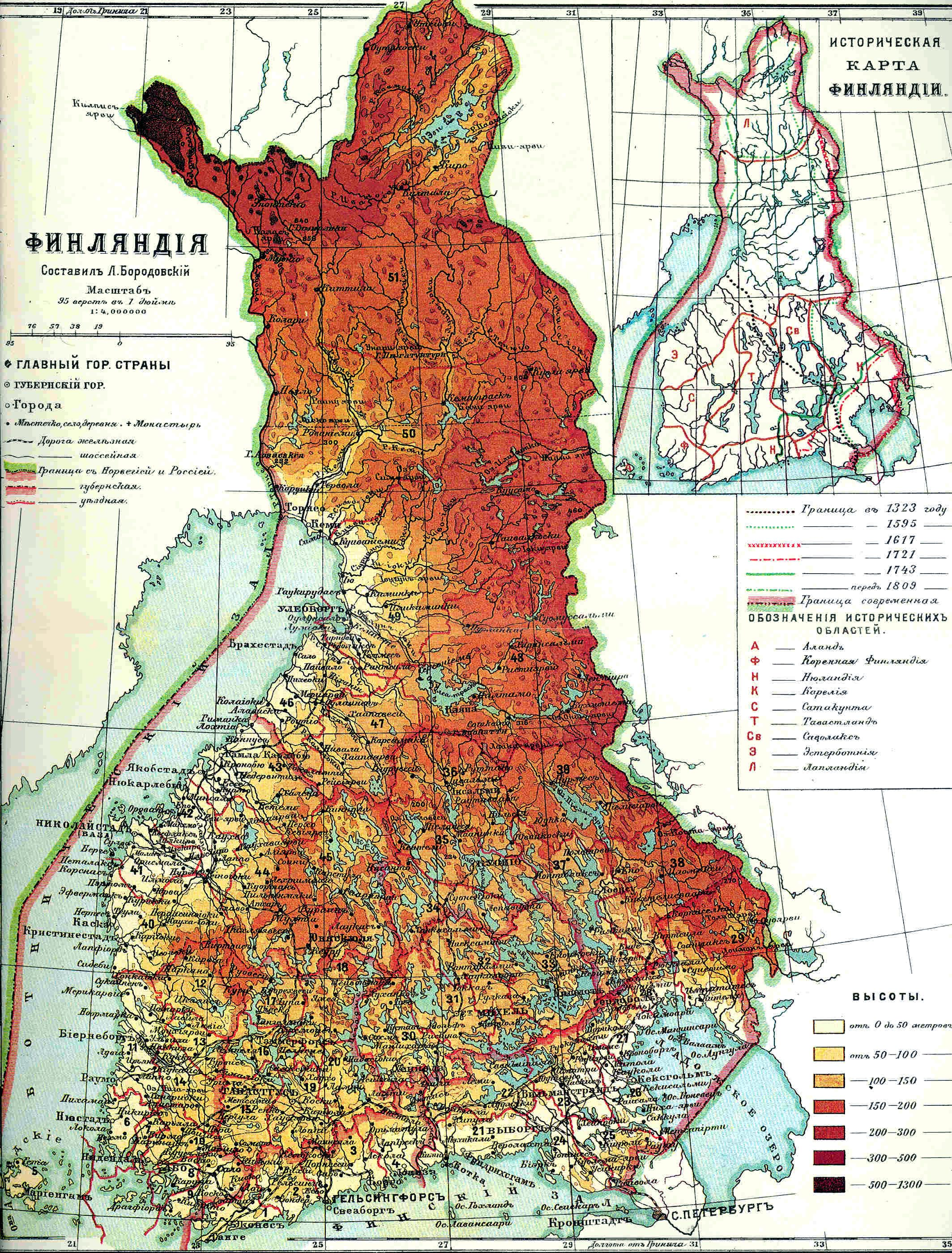
Map of Finland, about 1900. The map is in Russian and uses the Swedish place names written in Cyrillic.

Provinces of the Grand Duchy of Finland

The administrative division of the Grand Duchy followed the Russian imperial model with provinces (Russian: губерния governorate, Swedish: län, Finnish: lääni) headed by governors. Few changes were made however, and as the language of the administrators was still Swedish the old terminology from the Swedish time continued in local use. The Viipuri Province was not initially part of the Grand Duchy, but in 1812 it was transferred by Tsar Alexander I from Russia proper to Finland. After 1831 there were eight provinces in the Grand Duchy until the end and that continued in the independent Finland:

- Turku and Pori Province (Swedish: Åbo och Björneborgs län, Finnish: Turun ja Porin lääni, Russian: Або-Бьернеборгская губерния)
- Kuopio Province (Swedish: Kuopio län, Finnish: Kuopion lääni, Russian: Куопиоская губерния)
- Vaasa Province (Swedish: Vasa län, Finnish: Vaasan lääni, Russian: Вазаская губерния)
- Uusimaa Province (Swedish: Nylands län, Finnish: Uudenmaan lääni, Russian: Нюландская губерния)
- Mikkeli Province (Swedish: S:t Michels län, Finnish: Mikkelin lääni, Russian: Санкт-Михельская губерния)
- Häme Province (Swedish: Tavastehus län, Finnish: Hämeen lääni, Russian: Тавастгусская губерния)
- Oulu Province (Swedish: Uleåborgs län, Finnish: Oulun lääni, Russian: Улеаборгская губерния)
- Viipuri Province (Swedish: Viborgs län, Finnish: Viipurin lääni, Russian: Выборгская губерния)

=== Flags ===
The Grand Duchy of Finland had no official flag of its own, but different types of flags were used in different occasions. An official flag was debated even in the Diet of Finland in the 1860s, but one was never officially chosen. The flag of Russia was Finland's official flag until independence.

An official maritime flag was chosen in 1812 for governmental use. It was a white flag, with the Russian flag in the upper corner and a compass rose in the middle. In 1883 it was replaced with a blue cross flag with the compass rose in the upper corner. A post flag (a white flag with the Russian flag in the upper corner and a post horn in the middle) was also used in the Grand Duchy, along with a customs flag (a blue flag, with the Russian flag on the upper corner and the logo of the customs agency in the middle).

Originally, there were no regulations regarding merchant flags until 3 October 1821, when Finnish ships were given the right to fly the Russian flag without permission. White, blue and red flags with the Russian flag in the corner were also used. Later on six and nine-striped flags with the colors of the Russian flag twice or thrice saw some use.

A blue cross flag similar to that of the modern flag of Finland was first used by the yacht club Nyländska Jaktklubben in 1861, equipped with the coat of arms of Uusimaa in the upper corner. It was inspired by the similar flag used by the Neva Yacht Club. The flag of the yacht club was made official by the Senate in 1890 when the Swedish-speaking Östra Nylands Segelförening adopted the Flag of Sweden.

At the end of the 19th century, flags with the coat of arms were used in unofficial contexts such as private estates and protests. In official contexts, the Russian white-blue-red tricolour was primarily used.

The Grand Duchy of Finland participated in the 1912 Summer Olympics with their own team. In the opening ceremony, the Finnish team marched behind the Russian team with a Finland-sign. In the medal ceremonies, the Russian flag above a white-blue pennant reading "Finland" was raised for the Finnish athletes.

Flag of the Russian Empire was the official flag of the Grand Duchy

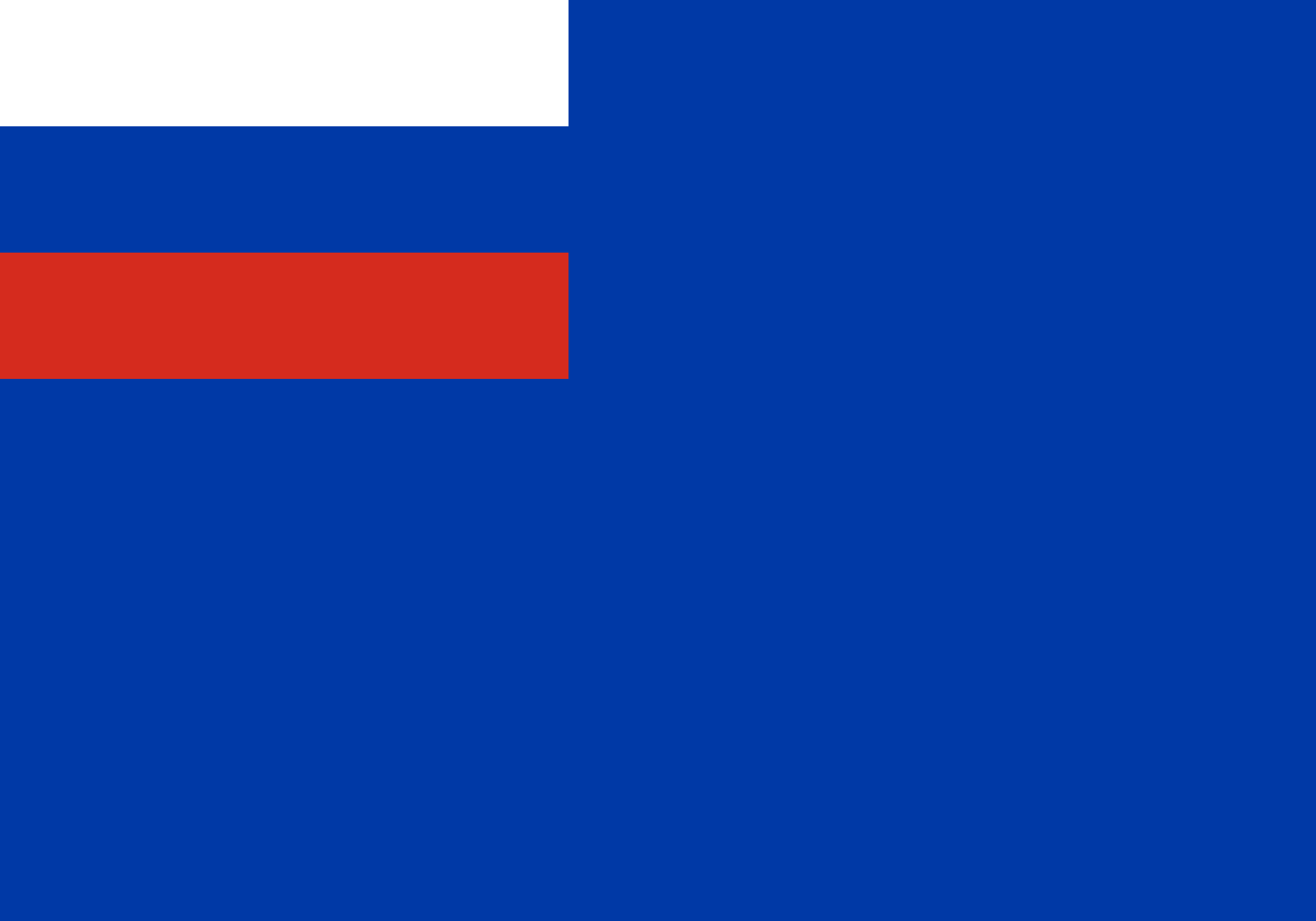
A variant of the Finnish merchant flag, 1809–1821

The yacht ensign used by Nyländska Jaktklubben, 1861–1900

A variant of the Finnish merchant flag used by the Swedish-speaking population, 1905

A Finnish-speaker version of the same flag

== Economy ==
Although promises of legislative autonomy were unfulfilled in the first fifty years, the Russian government encouraged economic development in Finland during this period. In the 1820s, English manufacturers were given the right to duty-free import "machines, raw materials and other materials for the textile industry" into Finland. In the following decade, the mining industry was developed, and by the 1840s, production had increased threefold. The number of workers in the textile industry also doubled in the 1840s. By 1856, Finland was given the right to have its own consular representatives in the major European centers of trade.

== Demographics ==
=== Population ===
1810: 863,000
1830: 1,372,000
1850: 1,637,000
1870: 1,769,000
1890: 2,380,000
1910: 2,943,000
1920: 3,148,000 (independent Finland, since 1917)

== See also ==
- Independence of Finland
- Military of the Grand Duchy of Finland
- Finnish Socialist Workers' Republic
- Old Finland
- Congress Poland – Kingdom of Poland (1815–1831), another constitutional monarchy within the Russian Empire
- Åland War
- Governorate of Estonia
- Grand Duchy of Lithuania
- Finnish Civil War

== Bibliography ==
- Hall, Wendy (1953), Green, Gold, and Granite, London: Max Parrish & Co.
- Jussila, Osmo; Henttilä, Seppo; Nevakivi, Jukka (1995), From Grand Duchy to a Modern State, London, United Kingdom: Hurst & Company.
- Jutikkala, Eino; Pirinen, Kauko (1962), A History of Finland (rev. ed.), New York, Washington: Praeger Publishers.
- Kirby, David (13 July 2006). A Concise History of Finland. Cambridge University Press. ISBN 978-0-5218-3225-0.
- Mäkinen, Ilkka. (Winter 2015), "From Literacy to Love of Reading: The Fennomanian Ideology of Reading in the 19th-Century Finland", Journal of Social History, vol. 49, no. 2.
- Pogorelskin, Alexis E. (1979). "Finland's position within the Russian Empire". The Modern Encyclopedia of Russian and Soviet History. Vol. 11. Academic International Press. pp. 155–162. ISBN 978-0-87569-064-3.
- Seton-Watson, Hugh (1967), The Russian Empire 1801–1917, London: Oxford.
- Wieczynski, Joseph L., ed. (1983). "Senate in Finland". The Modern Encyclopedia of Russian and Soviet History. Vol. 34. Academic International Press. p. 6. ISBN 978-0-87569-064-3..
