= Ivan Obolensky =

Ivan Obolensky may refer to:

- Ivan Mikhailovich Obolensky (1853–1910), Imperial Russian Lieutenant-General
- Ivan Sergeyevich Obolensky (1925-2019), American financial analyst and corporate officer
