= Franz Albert Seyn =

Russian general (1862 – c. 1918)

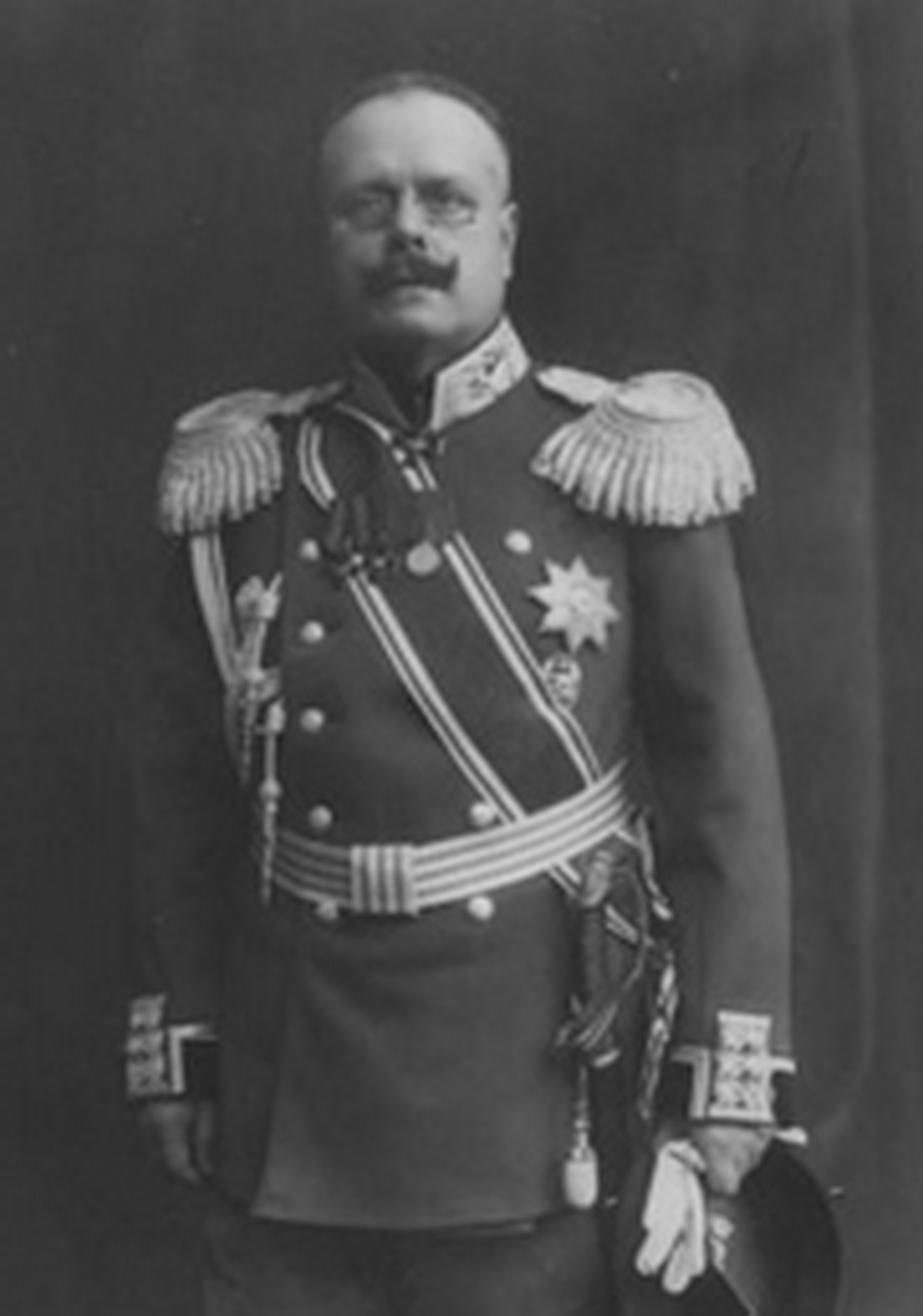
- Born: 27 July 1862; Vitebsk, Russian Empire
- Died: c. 1918 Kronstadt, Russian Empire
- Allegiance: Russia
- Rank: Lieutenant general

Governor-General of Finland
- In office 24 November 1909 – 16 March 1917
- Monarch: Nicholas II
- Preceded by: Woldemar von Boeckmann
- Succeeded by: Mikhail Stakhovich

Franz Albert Seyn (Russian: Франц Альберт Александрович Зейн, romanized: Frants Albert Aleksandrovich Zeyn; 27 July 1862 – summer 1918) was a Russian general who served as the governor-general of Finland from 24 November 1909 to 16 March 1917. He was one of the main implementers of Russification policies from 1909 to 1917.

== Biography ==
=== Early life and career ===
Seyn came from the lower nobility of Vitebsk Governorate, where his father, Aleksandr Seyn, served first as an officer and later as a civil servant. The area was populated by Belarusians, Lithuanians, Poles and Jews of various religious affiliations. Seyn became familiar from a young age with the Russian government's way of dealing with national minorities, something he later encountered when he served as a second lieutenant in the Caucasus, after completing officer and artillery school. He was admitted to the Imperial Military Academy in 1885, where he distinguished himself through his diligence and conscientiousness.

In 1890, Seyn was transferred to Helsinki and the staff of the Finnish Military District. There, he became acquainted with the practical problems caused by the fact that the armed forces in Finland were separate from the Russian one, and he was irritated by what he experienced as the Finns' sense of national superiority.

Before he became the governor-general of Finland, Seyn had been a staff officer in the Finnish Military District and an aide to the incumbent governor-general, Nikolai Ivanovich Bobrikov. After the assassination of Bobrikov in 1904 and the general strike in 1905, Seyn was forced to flee the country. He was appointed the governor of Grodno, a Russian-Polish-Jewish area in the western part of the empire near his hometown.

=== Governor-General of Finland ===
When Russia, under Prime Minister Pyotr Stolypin, had recovered from the revolution, work resumed on bringing Finland under the power of the imperial government. Seyn was called to the post of adjoint to Governor-General Nikolai Gerhard in 1907, and appointed governor-general in 1909, whereupon he also received the rank of lieutenant general.

Seyn advanced significant Russification policies. During his time, politically unaffiliated Finns and Russians who embraced the national ideology were appointed as senators and governors. The civil service was urged to use the common language of the empire, Russian teaching was expanded in schools, and history and geography textbooks were purged of expressions considered offensive to Russia. Finnish autonomy was further limited in 1908 and 1910 when laws passed that granted the Russian State Duma, instead of the Diet of Finland, rights to make laws concerning the Grand Duchy of Finland. There were also plans to detach parts of the Karelian Isthmus and attach them to Saint Petersburg Governorate, which caused protests among the population of the border areas.

During World War I, he actively opposed plans to conscript Finns into war service, warning that coercive measures would require an increased Russian military presence to maintain order. He also tried to secure grain imports from southern Russia despite the wartime overburdened railway lines.

=== Later life ===
After the February Revolution, Seyn was ordered arrested by the Provisional Government. The order was carried out by Adrian Nepenin, and Seyn was taken under guard to Saint Petersburg on 16 March. He was released after a while and applied for a pension from the Finnish state, which was denied. He was instead advised to apply for a pension from the Russian state because the office of governor-general had been changed to a Russian civil service at Seyn's own request. Seyn's life after that is unclear but it is believed that he was drowned in the Gulf of Finland, like many other imperial officers.

His wife Sofia Ivanovna Seyn, née Stewen, began working as Mikhail Borovitinov's housekeeper at some point after his death.

== Awards ==
- Order of Saint Anna, 1st class
- Order of Saint Anna, 3rd class
- Order of the White Eagle
- Order of Saint Stanislaus, 1st class
- Order of Saint Stanislaus, 2nd class
- Order of Saint Stanislaus, 3rd class
- Order of St. Vladimir, 2nd class
- Order of St. Vladimir, 3rd class
- Order of St. Vladimir, 4th class

== Sources ==
Political offices
Preceded by Woldemar von Boeckmann	Governor-General of Finland; 1909–1917	Succeeded by Mihail Aleksandrovich Stahovich
