= Governor-General of Finland =

Military commander and highest administrator of Finland from the 17th century to 1917

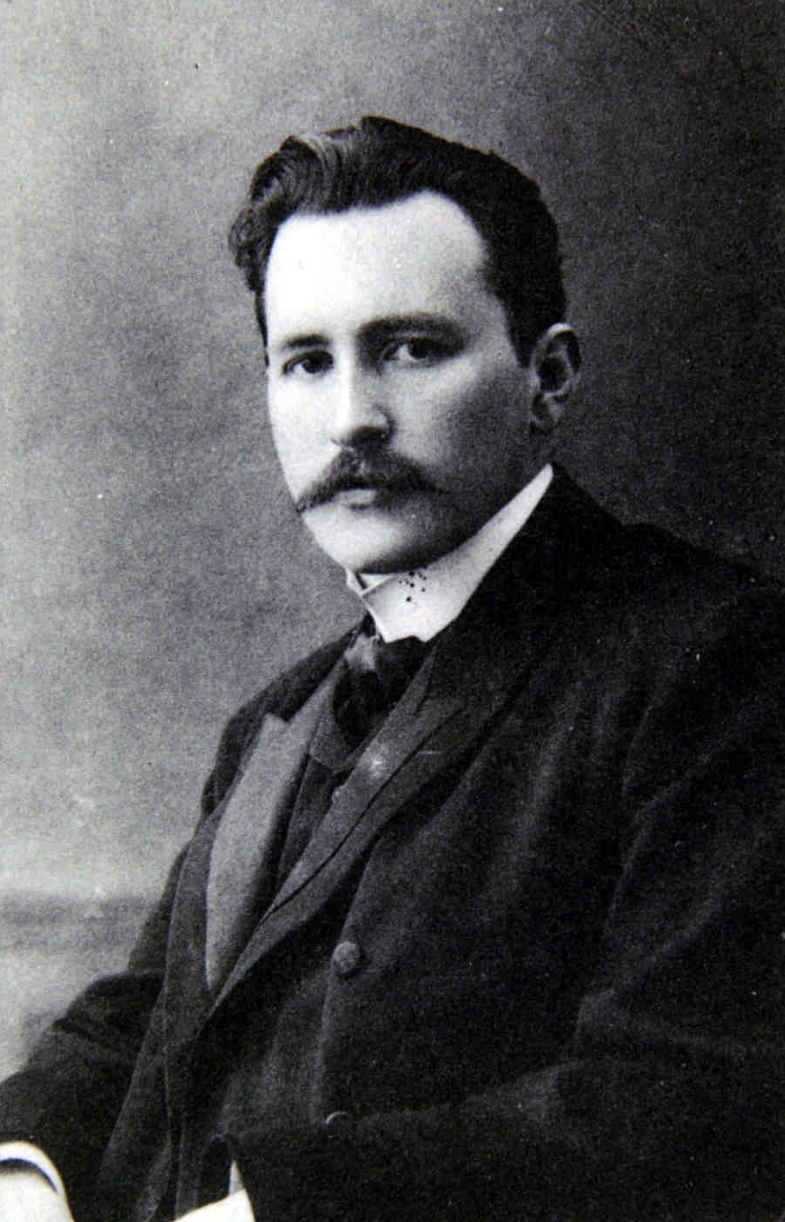
- Nikolai Vissarionovich Nekrasov, the last governor-general of Finland
- Appointer: King of Sweden, later Emperor of Russia
- Formation: 1623
- First holder: Nils Turesson Bielke
- Final holder: Nikolai Vissarionovich Nekrasov
- Abolished: 1917

The governor-general of Finland (Note: Finnish: Suomen kenraalikuvernööri; Swedish: generalguvernör över Finland; Russian: генерал-губернатор Финляндии) was the military commander and the highest administrator of Finland sporadically under Swedish rule in the 17th and 18th centuries and continuously in the autonomous Grand Duchy of Finland between 1809 and 1917.

== Swedish realm ==
Coat of arms of Finland under Swedish rule

After the final abolition of the Duchy of Finland and related feudal privileges in the late 16th century, the king of Sweden sporadically granted most or all of Finland under a specially appointed governor-general, who took care of the matters in the eastern part of the country more or less according to his own best judgement.

The best-known of these officials is Count Per Brahe the Younger, who served as Governor-General of Finland in the 17th century. His tenure, remembered as a period of reforms and progress in both economy and education, is referred to in Finnish as "kreivin aika" ("the count's era"). Over the centuries, the phrase has taken on a new meaning and is now commonly used to describe something happening just in time, as in the expression "Tulit kreivin aikaan" ("You arrived at the perfect moment").

=== List of Swedish governors-general of Finland ===
Translation in Swedish: Generalguvernör av Finland

Governor-general	In office
Nils Turesson Bielke	1623–1631
Gabriel Bengtsson Oxenstierna	1631–1634
Per Brahe the Younger	1637–1640 and 1648–1654
Gustaf Evertsson Horn	1657
Herman Fleming	1664–1669
Carl Nieroth	1710–1712
Gustaf Otto Douglas (during the Russian occupation in Great Northern War)	1717–1721
Johan Balthasar von Campenhausen (during the Russian occupation in the War of 1741–1743)	1742–1743
Gustaf Fredrik von Rosen	1747–1752

== Grand Duchy of Finland ==
Coat of arms of Finland under Russian rule

During the time when Finland was ruled by the Russian Empire as a grand duchy, the governor-general's position was permanent. He was viceroy of the emperor, who was not personally present in Helsinki, but resided in St Petersburg, just outside of Finnish borders. The governor-general was constitutionally the chairman of the Senate of Finland, the government in the autonomous grand duchy. The chairmanship he represented, with two votes in the Senate, belonged to the grand duke of Finland, a title held by the emperor of Russia. The governor-general was the highest representative of the emperor and received his instructions directly from the imperial government in Saint Petersburg.

Finnish citizenship was not required of the governor-general, contrary to all other highest positions such as senators and the minister-secretary of state. Most governors-general were Russians, men whom the emperor trusted as counterparts of potential Finnish separatism. Many of them, up to Baron Rokassovski, however were also made Finnish subjects, by granting them a Finnish nobility rank.

Many of the governors-general were disliked by the Finnish population. The first man on the post, Georg Magnus Sprengtporten, resigned after only a year. Another, Nikolai Bobrikov, was assassinated in 1904 by the Finnish nationalist Eugen Schauman. On the other hand, several governors-general worked in a way that guaranteed the Finnish autonomy in face of the interests of ministers of the imperial court.

The governor-general between 1831 and 1855, Prince Menshikov, sojourned his entire term in St Petersburg, being simultaneously the Russian minister of navy. Gubernatorial duties in Helsinki were cared for by the deputy governor-general. For most of the term, in that position was general Alexander Amatus Thesleff.

=== List of Russian governors-general of Finland ===
Translation in Russian: Генерал-губернатор Финляндии, romanized: general-gubernator Finlyandii

Governor-general	In office
Göran Magnus Sprengtporten	1808–1809
Michael Barclay de Tolly	1809–1810
Fabian Steinheil	1810–1823 (acting until spring 1824)
Arseny Zakrevsky	1823 (active from March 1824) – 1831
Alexander Menshikov	1831–1855
Friedrich Wilhelm Rembert von Berg	1855–1861
Platon Rokassovsky	1861–1866
Nikolay Adlerberg	1866–1881
Feodor Logginovich Heiden	1881–1897
Stepan Goncharov	1897–1898 (acting)
Nikolai Bobrikov	1898–1904
Ivan Obolensky	1904–1905
Nikolai Gerard	1905–1908
Vladimir Aleksandrovich Böckmann	1908–1909
Franz Albert Seyn	1909–1917
Adam Lipsky	1917 (acting)
Mikhail Aleksandrovich Stakhovich	1917
Nikolai Vissarionovich Nekrasov	1917

== See also ==
- Grand Duke of Finland
- Duke of Finland
- Diet of Finland
- Governor-General in the Swedish Realm
- Monarchy of Finland
- Finnish Minister Secretary of State
- List of Finnish rulers
