= Woldemar von Boeckmann =

Russian general (1848–1923)

- Born: 12 June 1848; Saint Petersburg, Russia
- Died: 26 November 1923 (aged 75) Nykyrka, Finland
- Allegiance: Russia
- Branch: Imperial Russian Army
- Rank: General of the cavalry
- Commands: 8th Cavalry Division; 12th Army Corps; 20th Army Corps; 22nd Army Corps
- Conflicts: Russian Revolution of 1905

Governor-General of Finland
- In office 1908–1909
- Preceded by: Nikolai Gerhard
- Succeeded by: Franz Albert Seyn

Woldemar Alexander Valerian von (Note: In German personal names, von is a preposition which approximately means 'of' or 'from' and usually denotes some sort of nobility. While von (always lower case) is part of the family name or territorial designation, not a first or middle name, if the noble is referred to by their last name, use Schiller, Clausewitz or Goethe, not von Schiller, etc.) Boeckmann (Russian: Влади́мир Алекса́ндрович Бе́кман, romanized: Vladimir Aleksandrovich Bekman; (Note: Alternatively Böckmann.) 12 June 1848 – 26 November 1923) was a Russian general who served as the governor-general of Finland from 1908 to 1909. Although known in Russian government circles as a "hard man" expected to advance Russification policies, he refused to provoke a constitutional conflict with the Finns and was forced to resign as a result.

== Biography ==
=== Military career ===
Boeckmann pursued a long military career in the Imperial Russian Army, commanding the 8th Cavalry Division from 1899 to 1904, the 12th Army Corps from 1904 to 1905, and the 20th Army Corps from 1905 to 1906. He led the suppression of the uprising in Courland during the Russian Revolution of 1905, and from 1906 to 1908 commanded the 22nd Army Corps stationed in Finland.

=== Governor-General of Finland ===
Boeckmann succeeded Nikolai Gerhard as the governor-general of Finland in February 1908.

In May 1908, Leo Mechelin's constitutional senate was forced to resign and was replaced by a coalition senate led by Edvard Hjelt. Most of the senators resigned in April 1909, however, following a dispute over a land lease decree. Boeckmann proposed that native Finns serving in the Russian military outside Finland be appointed to the senate, a solution that was accepted and led to the formation of the so-called Admiral Senate in October 1909.

In the summer of 1909, Boeckmann responded to a petition from Finns by stating that, if it were up to him, Finnish laws would be upheld. This statement provoked the nationalist Russian press, and at the end of November 1909, Boeckmann was forced to submit his resignation.

=== Later life ===
He was appointed to the State Council in 1909 but took little further part in public life. After the Russian Revolution, he returned to Finland and spent his final years at the Halila sanatorium in Nykyrka on the Karelian Isthmus as a guest of the Finnish state.

== Awards ==
- Order of Saint Anna, 3rd class, 1874
- Order of Saint Stanislaus (House of Romanov), 2nd class, 1878
- Order of Saint Anna, 2nd class, 1885
- Order of Saint Vladimir, 4th class, 1889
- Order of Saint Vladimir, 3rd class, 1895
- Order of Saint Stanislaus (House of Romanov), 1st class, 1898
- Order of Saint Anna, 1st class, 1902
- Order of Saint Vladimir, 2nd class, 1907
- Order of the White Eagle (Russian Empire) (8 August 1916)

Preceded by	Chief of Staff of the 6th Cavalry Division; 1884–1886	Succeeded by
Preceded by	Commander of the 8th Cavalry Division; 1899–1904	Succeeded by
Preceded by	Commander of the 12th Army Corps; 1904–1905	Succeeded by
Preceded by Semyon Vasilyevich Kakhanov	Commander of the 20th Army Corps; 1905–1906	Succeeded by Vladimir Vasilyevich Smirnov
Preceded by	Commander of the 22nd Army Corps; 1906–1908	Succeeded by
Preceded by Nikolai Gerhard	Governor-General of Finland; 1908–1909	Succeeded by Franz Albert Seyn

== Sources ==
- Institut für Ost- und Südosteuropaforschung (Institute for East and Southeast European Studies)
