= Nikolai Gerhard =

Russian military officer and politician

Nikolai Gerard
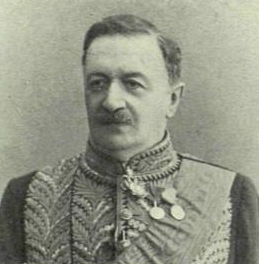
- Born: 3 September 1838; Gomelsky Uyezd, Mogilev Governorate, Russian Empire
- Died: 9 December 1929 (aged 91); Halila sanatorium, Viipuri Province, Finland
- Occupations: Civil servant, politician
- Title: Governor-General
- Spouse: Zinaida Afanasieva (married 1878)

Nikolai Nikolaevich Gerhard (Russian: Никола́й Никола́евич Ге́рард; born 3 September 1838 in Mogilev Governorate – 9 December 1929 in Halila sanatorium, Viipuri province, Finland) was a Russian civil servant and politician. He served as the Governor-General of Finland from 6 December 1905 to 2 February 1908.

== Biography ==
Gerhard's parents were the guards officer Nikolai Gerhard and Helena Piramidov. Before his appointment as Governor-General, Gerhard had handled legal assignments and served in the directing Senate. He was appointed governor-general in 1905 after Ivan Mikhailovich Obolensky resigned after the general strike.

His most important collaborators were initially the leader of the Constitutional Senate Leo Mechelin and the governor of Uusimaa County Max Theodor Alfthan. The cooperation between the governor-general and the senate went very well. During Gerhard's time, the objectives of the general strike were implemented: the old legal order was restored, pro-Russian governors, police chiefs and other officials were replaced, and the unicameral Diet began its work.

Gerhard had a benevolent attitude towards the White Guard, the Red Guards and the Voima Union (Finnish: Voimaliitto) and was of the opinion that peaceful and local demonstrations should not be interfered with. On 30 July 1906, a rebellion broke out in Suomenlinna, followed by riots in Hakaniemi. As a result of the rebellion, Gerhard was forced to agree to call up soldiers. After the events, plans were made to strengthen the police force. Due to Gerhard's opposition, the police were not provided with rifles as originally proposed, but only with pistols.

When the new parliamentary system was being drafted, Gerhard also supported women's suffrage, arguing that Finnish women had achieved a high level of intellectual development and held an independent position in society. According to Gerhard, the most important thing was that the emperor's power was not limited and that no obstacles were in the way of national legislation. He was of the opinion that Finland was an inseparable part of the Russian Empire. He advocated the idea of Finland being a separate administrative area under Russian authorities, but nevertheless stressed that the powers of the Finnish administration should be clearly limited.

The more nationalistic press began to attack Gerhard in the autumn of 1907, and the appointment in November 1907 of Franz Albert Seyn, who had been dismissed as head of the Governor-General's office two years earlier, as Gerhard's deputy was a clear sign that the Governor-General had fallen out of favor. Gerhard immediately applied for a resignation, which was granted and announced in February 1908.

As a result of the October Revolution of 1917, Gerhard lost his entire fortune. In 1922, he was invited to live as a guest of the Finnish state at the Halila sanatorium in Uusikirkko, where he lived until his death in 1929.

== Sources ==
- "Герард, Николай Николаевич" . Brockhaus and Efron Encyclopedic Dictionary (in Russian). 1906.

Political offices
Preceded by Ivan Mikhailovich Obolensky	Governor-General of Finland; 1905–1908	Succeeded by Vladimir von Boeckmann
