= Ivan Mikhailovich Obolensky =

Russian general, Governor-General of Finland (1853–1910)

Knyaz Ivan Mikhailovich Obolensky
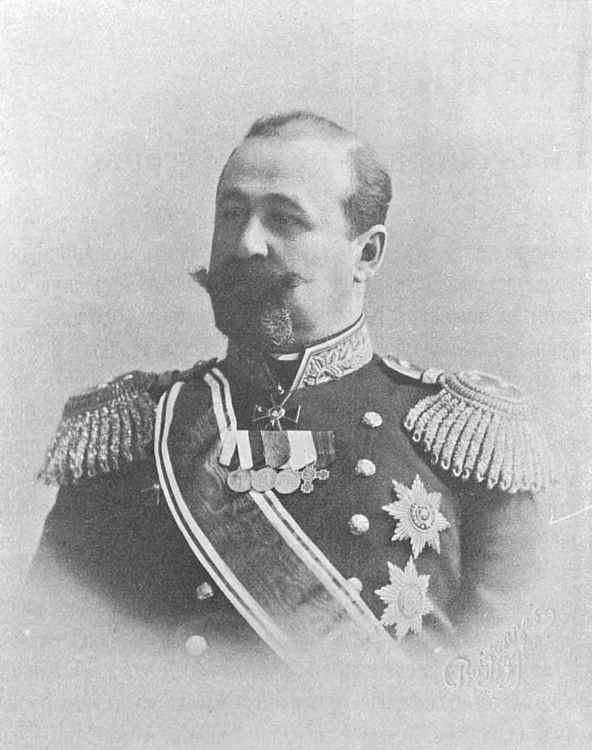
- Prince Ivan Mikhailovich Obolensky as Lieutenant general of the Imperial Russian Army (1904)
- Born: 1853; Moscow, Russian Empire
- Died: 28 February 1910 (aged 56–57) Saint Petersburg, Russian Empire
- Allegiance: Russian Empire
- Rank: Lieutenant-General
- Conflicts: Russo-Turkish War (1877–1878)

Knyaz Ivan Mikhailovich Obolensky (Russian: Ива́н Миха́йлович Оболе́нский), or Prince John Obolenski (1853 – 28 February 1910), was an Imperial Russian Lieutenant-General.

== Early life and ancestry ==
He was the son of Prince Mikhail Aleksandrovich Obolensky (1821–1886) of the Rurikid princely Obolensky family, whose ancestors once ruled one of the Upper Principalities, and his wife Olga Sturdza (1830–1895), a Romanian aristocrat. She was the daughter of Alexandru Sturdza—from a non-princely branch of the family and third cousin once removed of the Russian statesman Alexandru Sturdza—who served as Grand Treasurer of the Principality of Moldavia, and his wife, Princess Elena Ghika (1812–1881).

== Career ==
He served as the Governor-General of Finland from 18 August 1904 to 18 November 1905. His predecessor General Nikolai Ivanovich Bobrikov was assassinated in June 1904. He received a telegram from an unknown sender, saying: "We are expecting you in the near future -stop- The weather here is +200°C -stop- Bobrikov".

His term of office saw revolutionary turmoil in both Russia and the Grand Duchy of Finland. The Russian Revolution of 1905 resulted in a general strike in Finland and the replacement of the feudal Diet of Finland with the modern Parliament of Finland.

== Private life ==
As a young man, he fell in love with his second cousin, Natalie Keșco, and, with the support of his family, decided to propose to her. However, she had already fallen in love with another of her second cousins, Milan I of Serbia, and rejected his proposal in favor of him. She later became the first modern Queen Consort of Serbia.

He later married the wealthy heiress Alexandra Nikolaevna Topornina (1861–1945), the last descendant of an old Russian aristocratic family. Thanks to her inheritance, they lived in considerable luxury and became the parents of five children.

== Death ==
In 1905, he retired from public life and died in St. Petersburg in 1910.

Political offices
Preceded by Nikolai Ivanovich Bobrikov	Governor-General of Finland; 1904-1905	Succeeded by Nikolai Nikolajevich Gerhard
