= Polyany, Leningrad Oblast =

Rural locality in Vyborgsky District, Russia

Polyany Поляны
- Urban-type settlement
- Polyany WWII Memorial
- Interactive map of Polyany
- Location within Leningrad Oblast Location within European Russia Location within Russia
- Country: Russia
- Federal subject: Leningrad Oblast

Population
  - Estimate (2021): 1,337 )
- Time zone: UTC+3 (MSK)
- Postal code: 188824
- OKTMO ID: 41615464101

Polyany (Russian: Поля́ны; Finnish: Uusikirkko (Kirkkojärvi) Swedish: Nykyrka) is a settlement in Vyborgsky District of Leningrad Oblast, Russia, on the Karelian Isthmus. Before the Winter War and Continuation War, so until September 1944, it was the administrative center of the Uusikirkko municipality of the Viipuri province of Finland.

The Finnish names mean "New Church (Church Lake)" and the Swedish name also means "New Church". Mikael Agricola died there on return from the negotiations for the Treaty of Novgorod (1557).
