= Independence of Finland =

Separation from Russia, ending in 1917

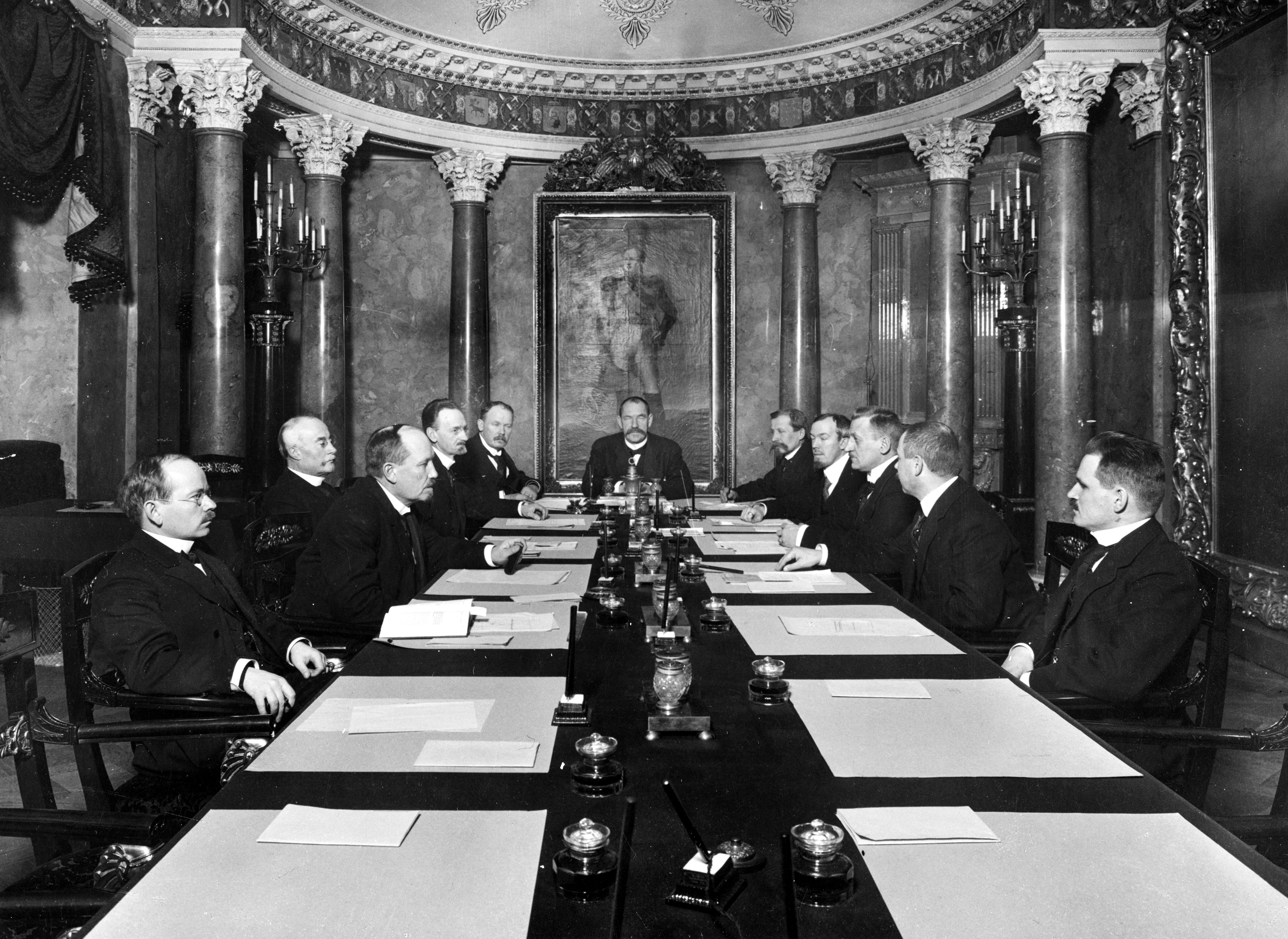
The Finnish Senate of 1917, Prime Minister P. E. Svinhufvud in the head of the table. Note the portrait of Alexander I of Russia in the background

Finland declared its independence on 6 December 1917. The formal Declaration of Independence was only part of the long process leading to the independence of Finland.

== History ==
=== Proclamation of Empress Elizabeth (1742) ===
The idea of an independent Finland was first raised in the 18th century, when the region was still part of Sweden. On 18 March 1742, during the Russo-Swedish War (1741–1743), Empress Elizabeth of Russia issued a proclamation addressed to the Finnish population. The proclamation promised that Russia would grant Finland independence "as a free country, under the dominion of no power", provided that the Finns ceased their resistance against the Russian forces. Although the proclamation can be regarded as wartime propaganda, the establishment of a Finnish buffer state, as well as the possible incorporation of Finland into the Russian Empire, was seriously discussed in Saint Petersburg.

After the Swedish forces capitulated in August 1742 and Finland came under Russian occupation, a Finnish delegation sought to petition Elizabeth to appoint her nephew Duke Charles Peter Ulrich of Holstein-Gottorp (later Tsar Peter III of Russia) as Grand Duke of Finland, hoping to avoid total annexation by Russia. However, the delegation was not permitted to travel to Saint Petersburg, and most of Finland was returned to Sweden under the Treaty of Åbo (Turku). Nevertheless, the idea of a Finnish buffer state lingered and resurfaced in Russian discussions in 1769.

=== Anjala conspiracy (1788) ===
The Anjala conspiracy was a scheme in 1788–1790 as a response to end Gustav III's Russian War, and it included the independence of Finland to some degree. Several people involved were linked to Walhalla-orden. Russian occupations and plundering of 1713–21 (the "Greater Wrath") (Finnish: Isoviha) and 1741–43 (the "Lesser Wrath") (Finnish: Pikkuviha) were still in vivid memory when Finns waged partisan warfare against the Russians.

Georg Magnus Sprengtporten, who took no direct part in the conspiracy, had written a proposal for a Finnish constitution in 1786. Sprengtporten later had a role in forming the autonomous Grand Duchy of Finland within the Russian Empire, as he became the first Governor-General of Finland after Sweden ceded the rest of Finland to Russia in 1809 at the conclusion of the Finnish War.

=== Rise of national identity ===
Hyökkäys by Eetu Isto, 1905, was a symbol of Russification, with the Maiden of Finland defending the law against the Russian eagle.

According to professor Martti Häikiö, before a nation declares independence, it must develop a national identity and certain institutions. Governing bodies for Finland were developed after 1809, when it was "elevated as a nation among nations" (as declared by Tsar Alexander I) by becoming an autonomous Grand Duchy under the Russian tsar. The Diet of Finland met regularly from 1863.

National identity grew simultaneously with Pan-European nationalism. Johan Ludvig Runeberg and Elias Lönnrot created an idealized image of Finnish people and Finnish nature in the 1830s and 1840s. Also J. V. Snellman was a central person in national romanticism and the modern nationality debate. He encouraged the use of the Finnish language (instead of Swedish) among the educated classes during Finland's language strife. The Finnish markka was introduced as currency in 1860 by the Bank of Finland, which Snellman pegged to silver instead of the ruble. During the famine of 1866–1868, Snellman worked to obtain aid and distribute it in a country with low resources and undeveloped communications.

Elisabeth Järnefelt held the literary salon Järnefelts skola (Järnefelt School), which became a center of the Fennoman movement. During the time 1880–1910 the golden age of Finnish art coincided with the national awakening. The central figure of the time was Akseli Gallen-Kallela. Other notable people were Aleksis Kivi and Albert Edelfelt.

The Fennoman motto was:

Swedes we are no more,
Russians we cannot become,
therefore Finns we must be.

The first period of Russification of Finland (Finnish: Ensimmäinen sortokausi) began in 1899 with the February Manifesto, a legislative act given by Nicholas II, when Nikolay Bobrikov was Governor-General of Finland. As a response, the cultural address Pro Finlandia was gathered with 523,000 names, and a delegation of 500 people was sent to Saint Petersburg to deliver it. The Kagal resistance movement formed at this time. In 1901 Russia tried to alter the nature of the Finnish army with a new conscription law, which demanded that Finns not only defend Finland, but also fight for Russia on any front. Finnish resistance grew into a mass movement, and only half of the eligible men reported for duty. Bobrikov was shot in 1904 by Eugen Schauman, who shot himself afterwards. The Finnish newspaper Päivälehti, which had been censored before, was closed permanently as a result of an editorial written about the assassination. Jean Sibelius composed In Memoriam in memory of Schauman. The steamship SS John Grafton unsuccessfully attempted to smuggle large quantities of arms for the Finnish resistance during the Russo-Japanese War (1904–1905). The Finnish general strike of 1905 temporarily halted russification.

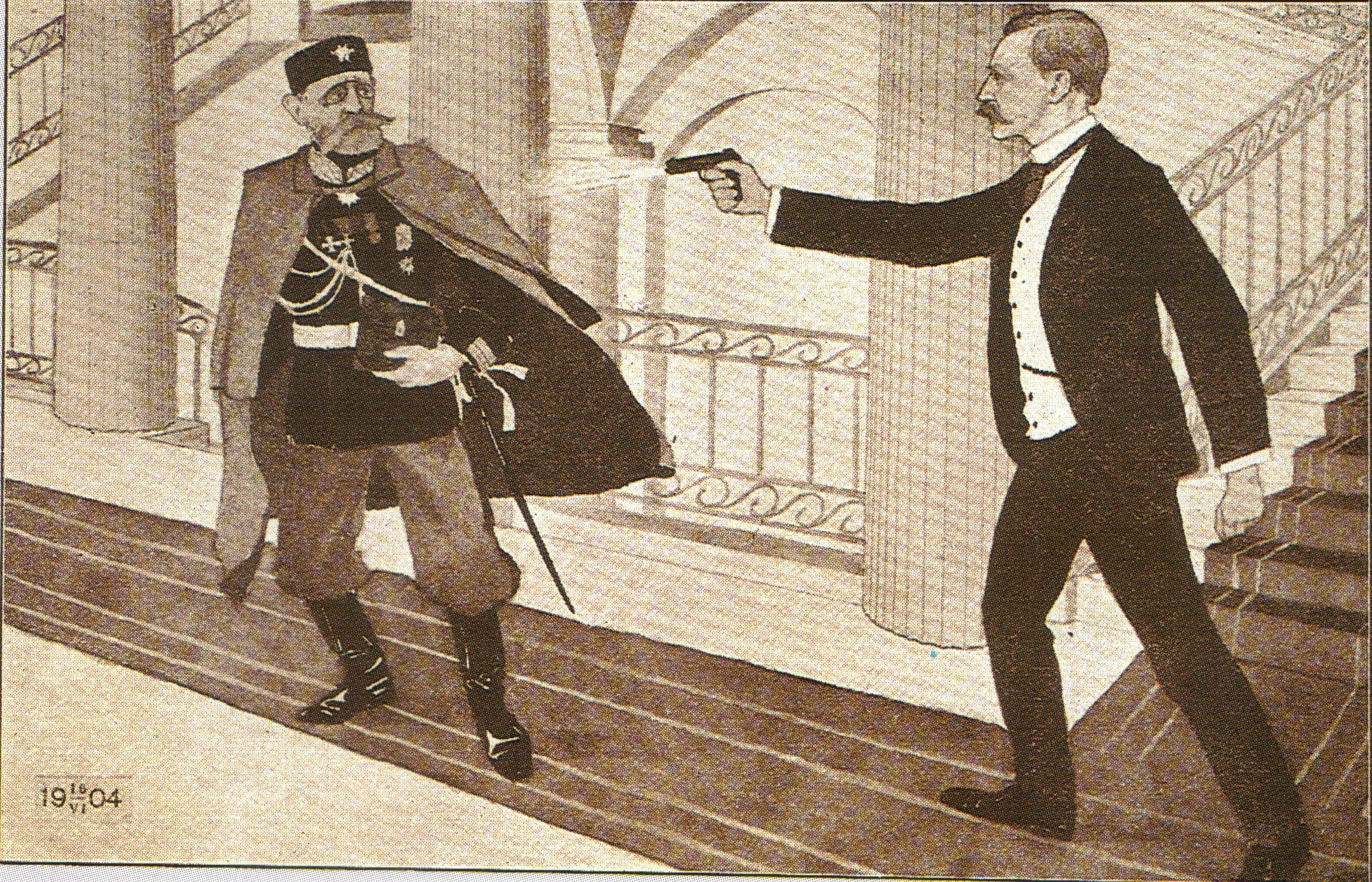
A drawing by an unknown artist about the assassination of Nikolay Bobrikov by Eugen Schauman

During 1905–1908 Leo Mechelin formed a government and created a liberal democracy with the universal right to vote and be elected. In 1906, the unicameral Parliament of Finland was created, with universal and equal suffrage. However, the power of the parliament was limited by the tsar from 1908 to 1916.

The second period of Russification of Finland (Finnish: Toinen sortokausi) in 1908 and World War I led activist groups to unite. Under Franz Albert Seyn, Bobrikov's successor as Governor-General, all legislation was moved to the Russian State Duma, which then pushed for laws restricting Finnish autonomy. Russia demanded higher payments and the Senate of Finland was replaced with the admiral-senate or saber-senate. Nicholas II pushed for complete russification and the end of Finnish autonomy in 1914, but this was halted by the beginning of the First World War. The Jäger Movement was formed and sent first 200, and later 1900, Finnish volunteers to Germany to be trained as Jägers (elite light infantry) for armed resistance. The Finnish Jägers formed the 27th Jäger Battalion and were eventually sent to Libau to fight against the Russian Empire. Sibelius composed the Jäger March on lyrics written by Heikki Nurmio, who served in the 27th Battalion.

=== Discussions in 1917 ===
==== Revolution in Russia ====
The February and October Revolutions in 1917 ignited hope in the Grand Duchy of Finland. After the abdication of Tsar Nicholas II on 2 March (15 March N.S.) 1917, the personal union between Russia and Finland lost its legal base – at least according to the view in Helsinki – as he was the Grand Duke of Finland. Negotiations began between the Russian Provisional Government and Finnish authorities.

==== Power act ====
The resulting proposal, approved by the Russian Provisional Government, was heavily rewritten in the Finnish Parliament and transformed into the so-called Power Act (Finnish: Valtalaki, Swedish: Maktlagen), whereby the Parliament declared itself to now hold all powers of legislation, except with respect to foreign policy and military issues, and also declared that it could be dissolved only by itself. At the time of the vote it was believed that the Provisional Government would be quickly defeated by the rebellion in Saint Petersburg. The Provisional Government survived, however, and disapproved of the Power Act and dissolved the Finnish Parliament.

After new elections and the ultimate defeat of the Provisional Government in the October Revolution, the Finnish Parliament decided to create a three-man regency council, based on Finland's Constitution, and more precisely on §38 of the old Instrument of Government of 1772, which had been enacted by the Estates after Gustav III's bloodless coup. This paragraph provided for the election of a new monarch in case of the extinction of the royal line and was interpreted in Finland as vesting sovereignty in the Estates, later the Parliament, during such an interregnum. The regency council was never elected, however, because of the strong opposition of Finnish socialists and their general strike of 1917 which demanded more radical action.

On 2 November (15 November N.S.) 1917, the Bolsheviks declared a general right of self-determination, including the right of complete secession, "for the Peoples of Russia". On the same day, the Finnish Parliament issued a declaration by which it assumed, pro tempore, all the powers of the Sovereign in Finland.

The old Instrument of Government was, however, no longer deemed suitable. Leading circles had long held that monarchism and hereditary nobility were antiquated, and advocated a republican constitution for Finland.

=== The Declaration and 15 November ===
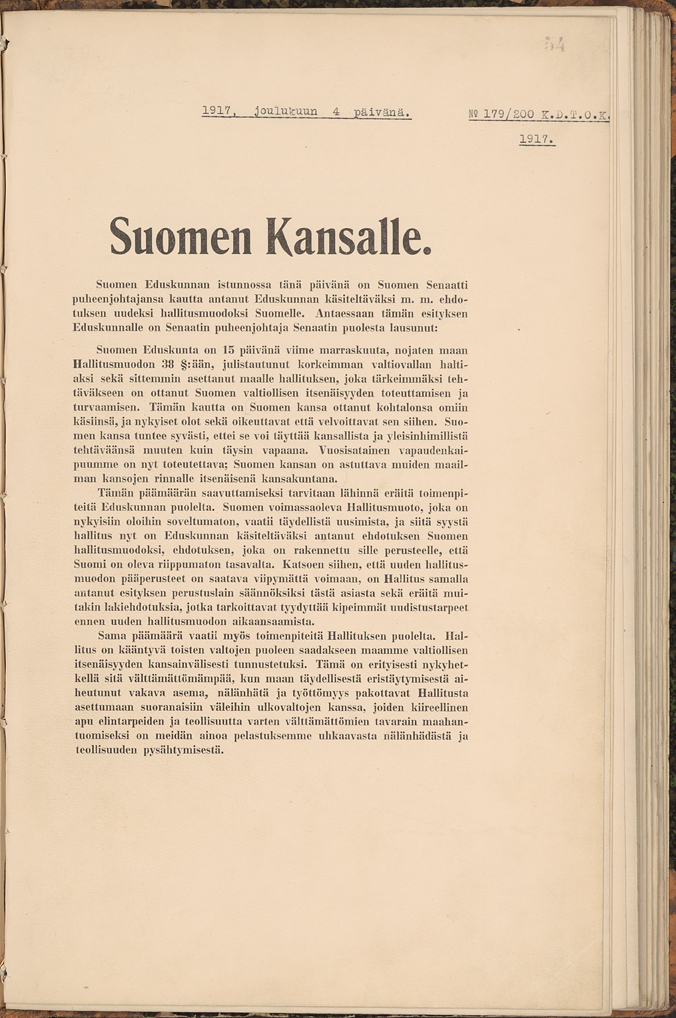
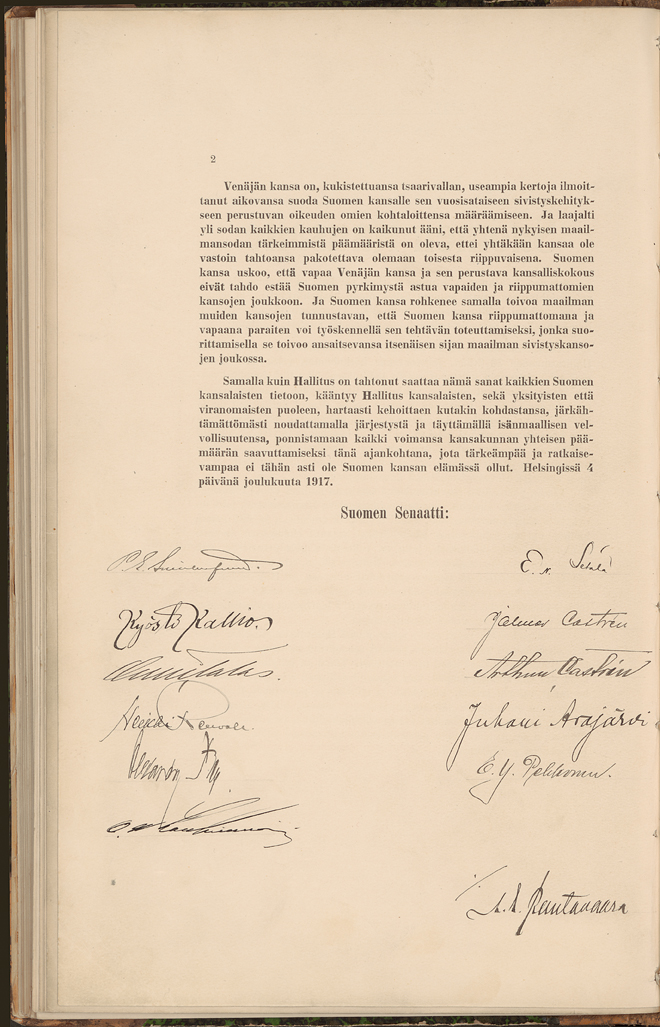
Image of the Declaration in Finnish with the senators' signatures
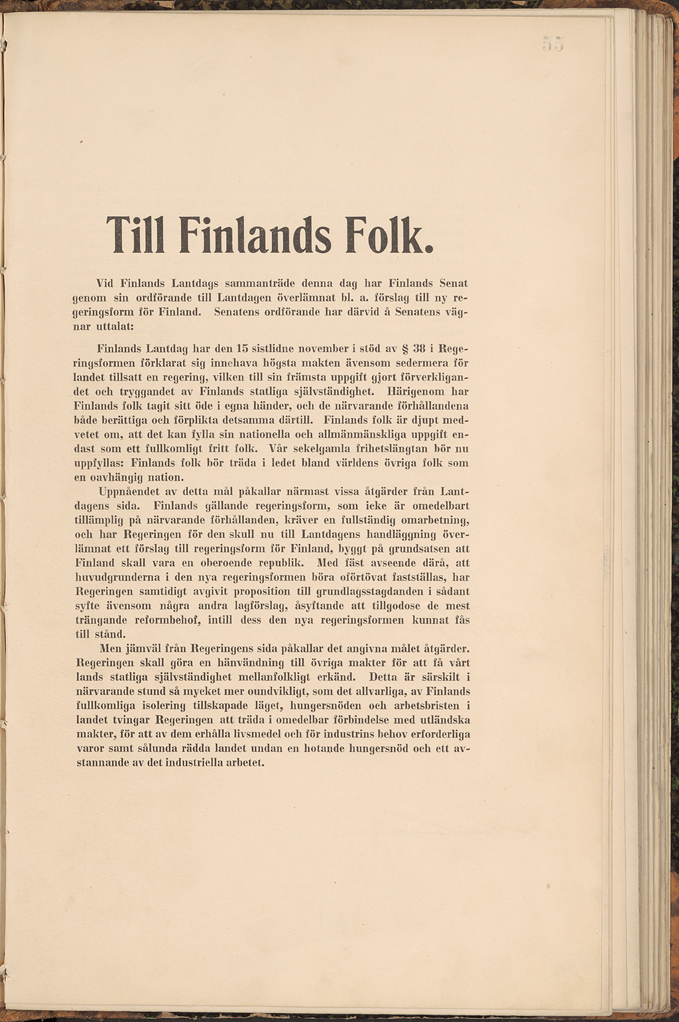
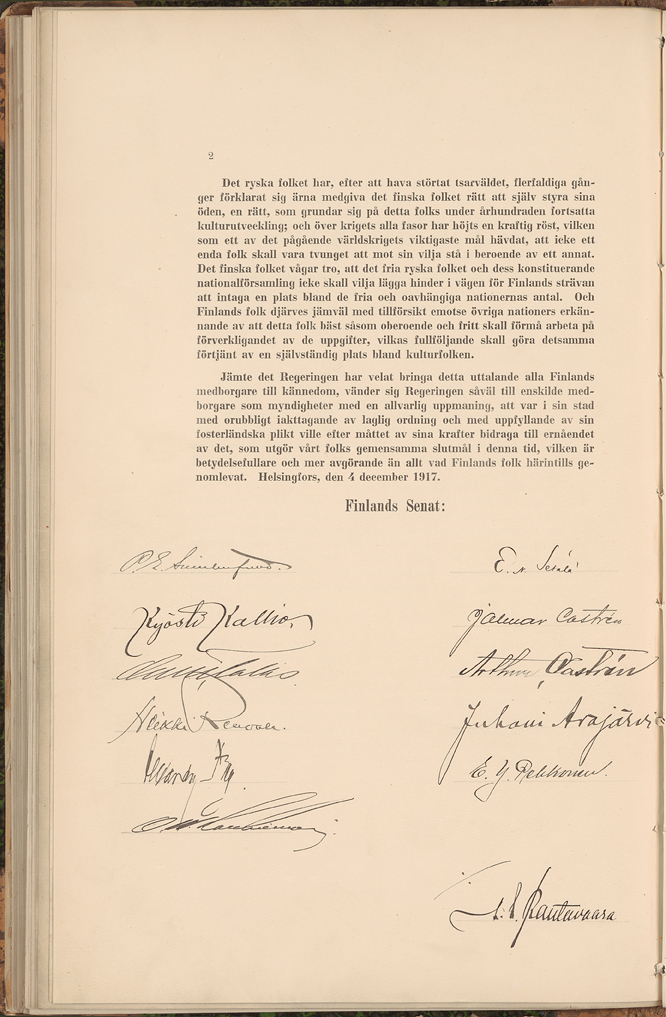
Image of the Declaration in Swedish with the senators' signatures

Pehr Evind Svinhufvud formed a Senate which started on 27 November 1917. Its goal was to execute independence as soon as possible. The Senate returned to the Parliament with a Declaration of Independence and proposal for a new republican Instrument of Government on 4 December. The Declaration of Independence was technically given the form of a preamble of the proposition, and was intended to be agreed upon by the Parliament. Parliament adopted the Declaration on 6 December with 100 votes against 88.

With reference to the declaration of 15 November, the new declaration says:

The people of Finland have by this step taken their fate in their own hands; a step both justified and demanded by present conditions. The people of Finland feel deeply that they cannot fulfil their national and international duty without complete sovereignty. The century-old desire for freedom awaits fulfilment now; Finland's people step forward as a free nation among the other nations in the world. ... The people of Finland dare to confidently await how other nations in the world recognize that with their full independence and freedom, the people of Finland can do their best in fulfilment of those purposes that will win them a place amongst civilized peoples.

==== International recognition ====
Svinhufvud immediately asked Sweden, Norway, Denmark, Germany, and France to recognize Finland's independence. The West, however, said they would wait until the former ruler, Russia, recognized the declaration. They told Svinhufvud to talk to Lenin's Bolshevik Government. Svinhufvud was hesitant to do this, as he did not want to recognize the Bolsheviks as the legal rulers of Russia. Besides, he thought that the Bolshevik government would probably fall soon, so the parliament decided instead to ask for recognition from the Russian Constituent Assembly. Germany, which was in middle of peace negotiations with Soviet Russia, pressured the Finns to talk to Lenin and the Council of People's Commissars. Svinhufvud followed their advice, as Finland wanted Germany's recognition as soon as possible.

On 18 December (31 December N.S.), the Soviet Russian government issued a decree recognizing Finland's independence, and on 22 December (4 January 1918 N.S.) it was approved by the highest Soviet executive body, the All-Russian Central Executive Committee (VTsIK). This is how the meeting is told in Svinhufvud's biography, Svinhufvud ja itsenäisyyssenaatti written by Erkki Räikkönen:

After trying in vain to meet the Soviets on December 30, 1917 - then Sunday - the next day, the delegation managed to submit this letter to Lenin's secretary, and in the evening at 9 o'clock it went to Smolny to hear the decision. "We waited a couple of hours in the big hallway and sat at the corner of the table," says Svinhufvud, "and we had the furs on and the caps on hand, because they didn't dare leave them." Smolna was busy despite the late hours. Guests came and went, typists ran down the hallways, even toddlers on the floor. On several occasions, Enckell tried to rush to the Soviet government's head of office, Vladimir Bonch-Bruyevich, but nothing helped. "We could only see", says Enckell, "how in one room the People's Commissars sat in thick tobacco smoke and probably pondered our case." Despite the fact that the furs were on, it became cold in the hallway while waiting. Finally, almost at midnight, Bonch-Bruyevich brought the decision of the Board of Commissioners.

It was worded as follows: "We rose one after another and signed with special satisfaction the recognition of Finland's independence," writes I. Steinberg, who was a justice commissioner in Lenin's government. "We knew that Finland's current hero Svinhufvud, once sent to exile by the tsar, was our public social enemy. and that he would not spare any of us in the future. But if we free the Finnish people from the oppression of Russia, there will be one less historical injustice in the world." Despite the fact that this letter merely announced the proposed recognition of Finland's independence, it actually meant full recognition of independence, as the confirmation of the Executive Committee was only a formality. Thus, in the last hour of the last day of the year, Finland had received an official certificate of resignation from Russia. After handing over this formal declaration of independence to the delegation, Bonch-Bruyevich planned to say goodbye and leave, but then Enckell pointed out: "When the Chairman of the Finnish Government is here, would it not be desirable for him to meet Lenin in person and express his gratitude to the Finnish people for the recognition of their independence.

Bonch-Bruyevich now went back to the commissioners' room, informing the commissioners that Svinhufvud was waiting in the hallway and wanted to thank Lenin. This resulted in great confusion, Lenin shrugged, laughed a little embarrassed, and refused. "What can I say to those bourgeoisie!" It was then suggested that Leon Trotsky go to greet the guests, but he too refused sharply. It was finally invented that Justice Commissioner Steinberg should agree to the request. "What can I tell them," he asked and continued: "I could only arrest them in my post!" Trotsky laughed cunningly at this: "Like you would capture!" Now Bonch-Bruyevich was nervous. He interrupted the play and again asked Lenin to go out to greet the Finns. In a worn suit and head presses, Lenin was now following Bonch-Bruyevich, while the hall was still laughing and counting dives. "Lenin came and held out his hand to us, and we introduced him to Svinhufvud," says Enckell of this historic scene, adding that "Lenin squeezed Svinhufvud's hand cordially." "Are you satisfied now?" Lenin asked. "Very satisfied," replied Svinhufvud. "Russia was spoken there and answered in Russian," says Svinhufvud, adding that "it only said a sad thank you for the letter of resignation." The Finns left now. Svinhufvud, Enckell, and Idman rushed quickly to the Secretary of State's Office. A typewritten copy of the recognition of independence was urgently taken there, after which we left for the station and from there continued by train to Finland. A few days later, the Russian Central Executive Committee confirmed the recognition of Finland's independence, which was thus finally decided for Russia.

The independence of Finland was recognized after that by Germany, Sweden, and France on 4 January 1918, by Norway and Denmark on 10 January, and by Austria-Hungary on 13 January.

=== Organizing a new country ===
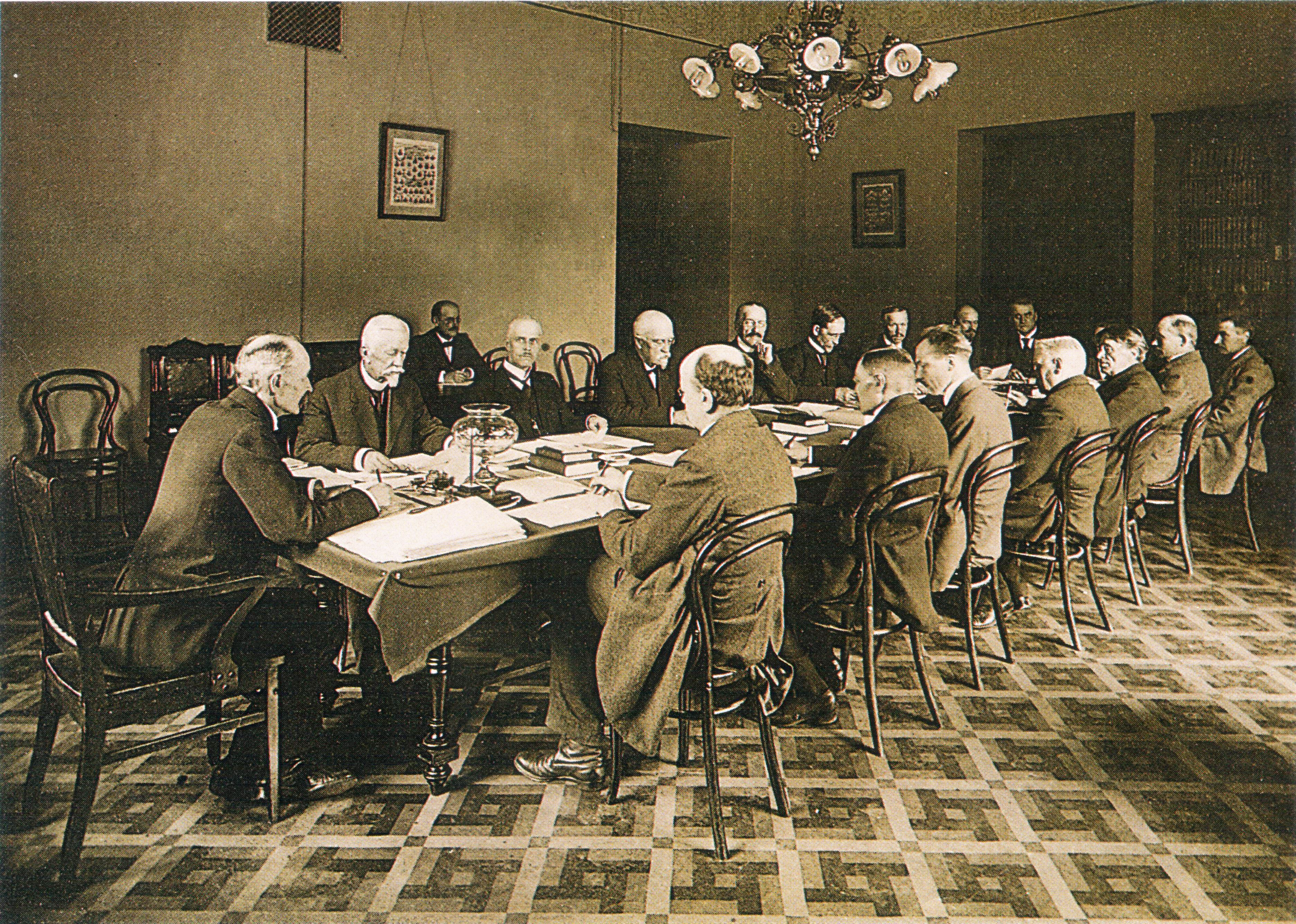
The meeting of the Finnish Parliament's Constitutional Law Committee in Säätytalo in 1918

Hardship burdened the common people, resulting in polarization, and soon ignited the Civil War. The declaration actually addresses this problem:

The Government will approach foreign powers to seek the recognition of our political independence. All the complications, famine and unemployment ensuing from the present external isolation make it urgent for the Government to tie direct contacts with foreign powers without delay. Urgent, concrete assistance in the form of necessities for living and industry is our only rescue from imminent famine and industrial standstill.

Many of the necessary ministries and authorities had been founded during years of autonomy, and they continued their activities perhaps after a change of name. The Bank of Finland had the same position as before. As pilotage has military significance, the National pilot office had been subjected to russification. The National Board of Navigation, later called the Finnish Maritime Administration, was founded 15 December 1917, and piloting became its responsibility.

The attempt to establish a monarchy in Finland failed and in 1919 Kaarlo Juho Ståhlberg became the first president. The first parliamentary elections were held in March 1919.

== List of recognition ==
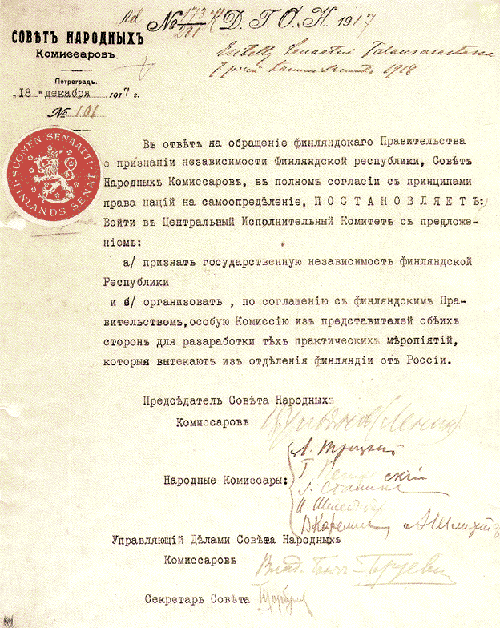
The decision of the Soviet of the People's Comissars' to recognise Finnish independence, signed by Vladimir Lenin, Leon Trotsky, Grigory Petrovsky, Joseph Stalin, Isaac Steinberg, Vladimir Karelin, and Alexander Schlichter

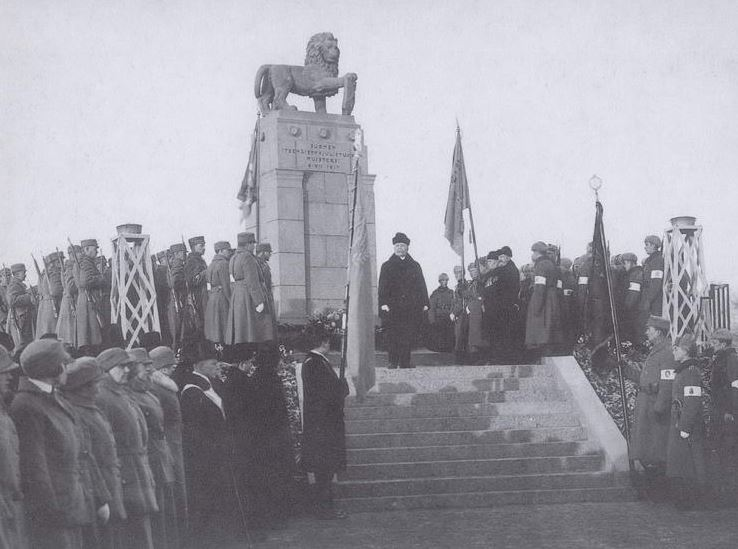
"The Lion of Independence" monument was erected in honor of the tenth anniversary of Finland's independence.

State	Date
Russian Soviet Federative Socialist Republic	4 January 1918
France	4 January 1918
Sweden	4 January 1918
German Empire	4 January 1918
Kingdom of Greece	5 January 1918
Norway	10 January 1918
Denmark	10 January 1918
Switzerland	11 January 1918
Austria-Hungary	13 January 1918
Netherlands	28 January 1918
Spain	21 February 1918
Ottoman Empire	21 February 1918
Kingdom of Bulgaria	21 February 1918
Holy See	2 March 1918
Argentina	11 May 1918
Qajar Iran	23 July 1918
Siam	9 October 1919
Poland	8 March 1919
United Kingdom	6 May 1919
United States	7 May 1919
Japan	23 May 1919
Belgium	10 June 1919
Chile	17 June 1919
Peru	23 June 1919
Kingdom of Italy	27 June 1919
Uruguay	18 August 1919
Liechtenstein	27 October 1919
Portugal	19 December 1919
Brazil	26 December 1919
Colombia	31 December 1919
Kingdom of Romania	8 April 1920
Venezuela	18 April 1920
Panama	17 May 1920
Ecuador	25 June 1920
Mexico	13 July 1920
Kingdom of Hungary	23 August 1920
Paraguay	3 June 1921
Luxembourg	25 October 1921
Kingdom of Yugoslavia	27 July 1922
Emirate of Afghanistan	17 July 1928
Kingdom of Albania	1 December 1928
Chile	20 February 1931

== National symbols ==
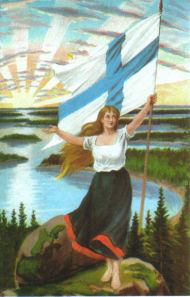
The Maiden of Finland and the blue and white flag

From several suggestions, the parliament selected a blue and white flag, which was flown over the house of parliament on 28 May 1918. The coat of arms of Finland, with a crowned lion on a red field had existed since Swedish rule.

Selection of the national anthem divided social classes. The conservatives preferred "Maamme" by Runeberg and Pacius, while the working class was singing "La Marseillaise" and "The Internationale". After the Whites won the Finnish Civil War, "Maamme" was chosen.

Finland's Independence Day was declared to be 6 December and a national holiday. The bill to make Finland a republic was passed by the Diet in 1919.

On 24 February 2026, Finland counted 39,527 days as an independent state. This means that Finland has been independent for longer than it was under Russian rule.

== Commemoration ==
The 90th anniversary of Finland's Declaration of Independence was selected as the main motif for the €5 90th Anniversary of Finland's Declaration of Independence commemorative coin, minted in 2007. The reverse shows petroglyph aesthetics, while the obverse has a nine-oar boat with rowers as a symbol of collaboration. Musical symbols and Finnish kantele strings are also included in the coin's design.

== See also ==
- Timeline of Independence of Finland (1917–1920)
- History of Finland
- Politics of Finland
- Finland under Swedish rule
- Heimosodat
- Trust (1976 film)
