= 1930 in Nordic music =

The following is a list of notable events and compositions of the year 1930 in Nordic music.

== Events ==
- June – Carl Nielsen begins work on his final composition, Commotio.
- June – The Althing Festival, commemorating the millennium of the Icelandic Althing, is held in Thingvellir and includes the first performance of Páll Ísólfsson’s Althing Festival Cantata. Jón Leifs decides not to submit his (as yet unfinished) work to the competition; his work, Þjóðhvöt, is premiered at a festival in Greifswald later that year.
- unknown date
  - The Reykjavik College of Music (Tónlistarskólinn í Reykjavík) is founded by Páll Ísólfsson.
  - Julius Röntgen publishes his biography of his friend, Norwegian composer Edvard Grieg.
  - Ture Rangström loses his job as a critic on Stockholms Dagblad.

== New works ==
- Hugo Alfvén – Natt
- Jón Leifs – Organ Concerto
- Jón Leifs - Þjóðhvöt
- Jean Sibelius
  - 4 Pieces for Violin and Piano, Op.115
  - 3 Pieces for Violin and Piano, Op.116
  - Karelia's Fate
- Páll Ísólfsson - Althingi Festival Cantata

== Popular music ==
- Hiski Salomaa – "Lännen lokari"

== Film music ==
- Eric Bengtson
  - Fridas visor
  - (with John Kåhrman) Kronans kavaljerer

== Births ==
- 27 January – Usko Meriläinen, Finnish composer (died 2004)
- 14 April – Ola Calmeyer, jazz pianist (died 2003).
- 23 April – Mikkel Flagstad, Norwegian saxophonist (died 2005)
- 28 April – Jürgen Ahrend, German organ builder who worked in Scandinavia (died 2024)
- 8 May – Papa Bue, Danish jazz trombonist (died 2011)
- 13 May – Erik Moseholm, Danish jazz bassist (died 2012)
- 27 July – Einar Iversen, Norwegian pianist and composer (died 2019)
- 10 August – Jorma Panula, Finnish conductor and composer
- 22 August – Rolf Billberg, Swedish jazz saxophonist (died 1966)

== Deaths ==
- 1 January – Peter Brynie Lindeman, Norwegian organist, cellist, and composer (born 1858)
- 1 May – Emil Genetz, Finnish composer (born 1852)
- 5 May – Henning Mankell, Swedish pianist and composer (born 1868)
- 16 June – Hannah Løvenskiold, composer (born 1860)
- 21 June – Hans Ingi Hedemark, Norwegian operatic tenor (born 1875)
- 12 July – Lotten Edholm, Swedish composer and a pioneer in the Swedish Red Cross (born 1839)
- 30 October – Joël Blomqvist, hymnwriter (born 1840)
- 1 December – Michael Flagstad, Norwegian conductor, grandfather of Mikkel Flagstad (born 1869)
- 29 December – Oscar Borg, Norwegian conductor and composer (born 1851)

== See also ==
- 1930 in Denmark
- 1930 in Iceland
- 1930 in Norwegian music
- 1930 in Sweden
