= 1917 in Nordic music =

The following is a list of notable events and compositions of the year 1917 in Nordic music.

== Events ==
- 24 October – The Norwegian Society of Composers (Norsk komponistforening) is founded in Oslo by Gerhard Schjelderup, Eyvind Alnæs and others.
- early in the year – Jean Sibelius, following another drinking bout, is inspired by the Russian Revolution and begins writing the Jäger March, setting Heikki Nurmio's words to music.

== New works ==
- Hugo Alfvén – Kantat vid Reformationsfesten i Uppsala 1917 [Cantata for the 1917 Reformation Festivities in Uppsala]
- Nancy Dalberg – Symphony in C-sharp minor
- Launy Grøndahl – Violin Concerto in D Major
- Armas Launis – Kullervo (opera)
- Carl Nielsen – Chaconne, for piano
- Jean Sibelius – Humoresques for Violin and Orchestra op. 87 and 89

== Popular music ==
- Hjalmar Peterson – "Nikolina"
- Jean Sibelius & Heikki Nurmio – "Jäger March"
- Jean Sibelius & Jonatan Reuter – "Till havs"

== Births ==
- 2 January – Vera Zorina, Norwegian dancer and actress (died 2003)
- 18 February – Eva Gustavson, Norwegian operatic contralto (died 2009)
- 20 April – Eva Prytz, Norwegian operatic soprano (died 1987)
- 19 May – Ingvar Wieslander, Swedish composer (died 1963)
- 9 September – Maj Sønstevold, Norwegian composer and music teacher (died 1996).
- 22 December – Hans W. Brimi, Norwegian folk musician (died 1998)

== Deaths ==
- 4 March – Julius Bechgaard, Danish composer (born 1843)
- 20 March – Sophie Cysch, Swedish operatic mezzo-soprano (born 1847)

== See also ==
- 1917 in Denmark
- 1917 in Norwegian music
- 1917 in Sweden
