= Nurmio =

Nurmio is a Finnish surname. Notable people with the surname include:

- Heikki Nurmio (1887–1947), Finnish jäger and writer
- Tuomari Nurmio (born 1950), Finnish singer-songwriter
- Yrjö Nurmio (1901–1983), Finnish historian and archivist

== See also ==
- Nurmi
