= Kurikkala (surname) =

Kurikkala is a Finnish surname.

== Geographical distribution ==
As of 2014, 98.8% of all known bearers of the surname Kurikkala were residents of Finland (frequency 1:32,915).

In Finland, the frequency of the surname was higher than national average (1:32,915) in the following regions:

1. Central Ostrobothnia (1:2,229)
2. North Ostrobothnia (1:3,559)
3. Southern Savonia (1:20,436)

== People ==
- Jussi Kurikkala (1912–1951), Finnish cross-country skier

== See also ==
- Kurikka (magazine), Finnish satirical magazine
