= Alex Federley =

Finnish artist and political cartoonist (1864–1932)

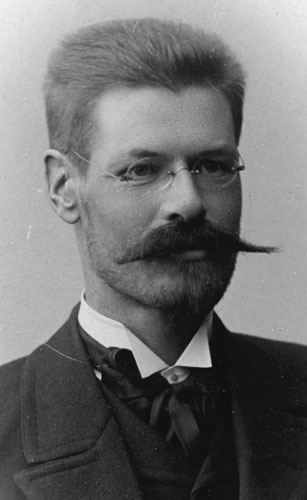
- Alex Federley (c.1900); from the Biografiskt Lexikon för Finland
- Born: July 12, 1864; Turku
- Died: November 17, 1932 (aged 68)

Alexander Thiodolf Federley (12 July 1864, in Turku – 17 November 1932, in Helsinki) was a Finland-Swedish graphic artist who created political cartoons, posters, book illustrations and postcards. His works are generally signed AFley.

== Biography ==
His father was Axel Thiodolf Federley, a military judge, and his mother was Ida Josefina Thomé. He studied at the drawing school of the Finnish Art Society in Turku from 1882 to 1885 and then in the same school in Helsinki (now part of the Academy of Fine Arts, Helsinki), from 1885 to 1888, after which he attended the Académie Julian in Paris from 1891 to 1893, where he studied with Jules Joseph Lefebvre and Tony Robert-Fleury.

In the late 1880s, he was already providing illustrations to the Swedish-language satirical magazine Spets (Nib), then to the Finnish-language equivalent, Velikulta (Dear Brother), published by the Young Finnish Party. During that time, he also became one of the first political cartoonists in Finland to sign his drawings. Among his best-known book illustrations are those for the multi-volume collection of historical short-stories, Fältskärns berättelser (The Surgeon's Tales), by Zachris Topelius.

In 1898, he became a regular contributor to Fyren (Lighthouse), published by the Swedish Party (forerunner to the Swedish People's Party of Finland) and remained associated with it until its demise in 1922. His primary artistic influence was Adolf Oberländer of the Munich magazine Fliegende Blätter, whose naively unaffected style he emulated, often working under the pseudonym Ante. In 1907, ahead of the first elections to the unicameral Parliament of Finland, he designed the party's election poster depicting a coastal fisherman on a skerry holding a flag with Finland's heraldic lion – an emblem known as "Mannen med flaggan" (The Man with the Flag) that remained in use for over fifty years. During the 1920s, he was the party's representative to the Haaga Township Council.

In addition to his other activities, from 1894 to 1916, he was the Chief Curator for the "Finnish Artists' Association", and he taught at a boys' preparatory vocational school from 1900 until his death, serving as the school's Director from 1905 to 1927. His wife, Sanny Hagelstam, whom he married in 1898, was also an artist.

== Selected works ==
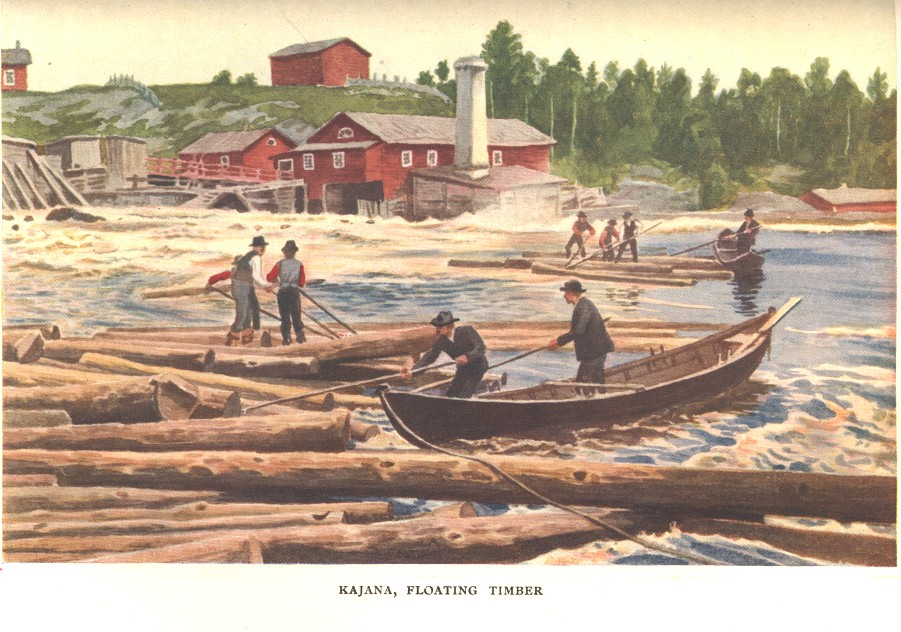
Postcard of lumber in the rapids near Kajaani

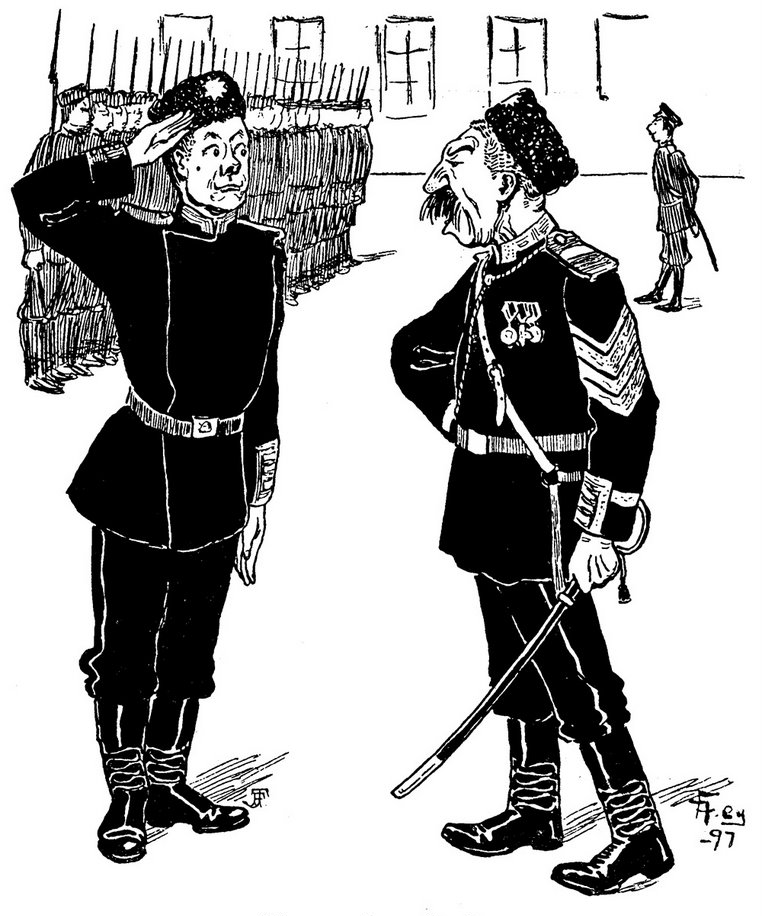
"Haven't I told you to keep your mouth shut when
talking to people?!"

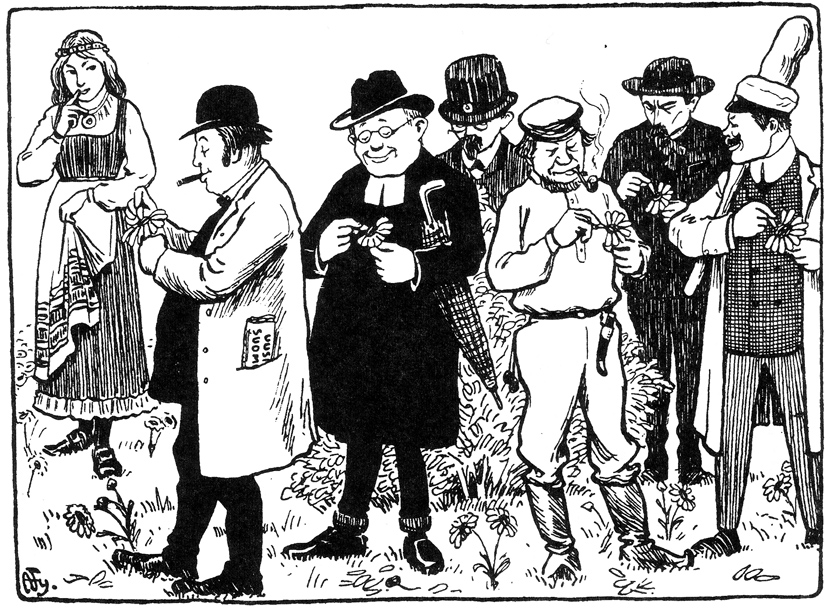
Men representing various political parties, competing for the Finnish Maiden

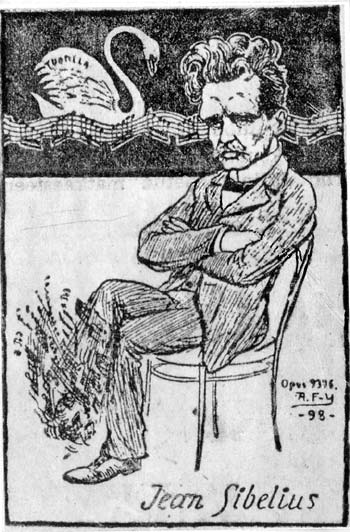
Caricature of
Jean Sibelius

== Books by Federley ==
- Bilder och visor : små spånor och flisor – i färger och ord – från mitt arbetsbord Bildkonst, 1929 (Pictures and songs: small chips and splinters – in colors and words – from my desk; published in Finnish as Lauluja ja kuvia, lapsille huvia, suomentanut mukaillen A. L., Kuvataide, [1929]
- Sagor om djur och fåglar, mest om fåglar, Söderströms, 1922 (Fairy tales about animals and birds...mostly birds.)
