= Lännen lokari =

1930 American Finnish song

"Lännen lokari" ("The Western Logger") is a 1930 American Finnish song written by Hiski Salomaa. "Lännen lokari" is one of Salomaa's most popular songs. The word lokari is a word in American Finnish, coming from the English word "logger". The song also contains many other English loanwords found in American Finnish. It is one of the most known American Finnish songs.
