= Russification of Finland =

Russian policy of suppressing Finnish autonomy (1899–1905, 1908–17)

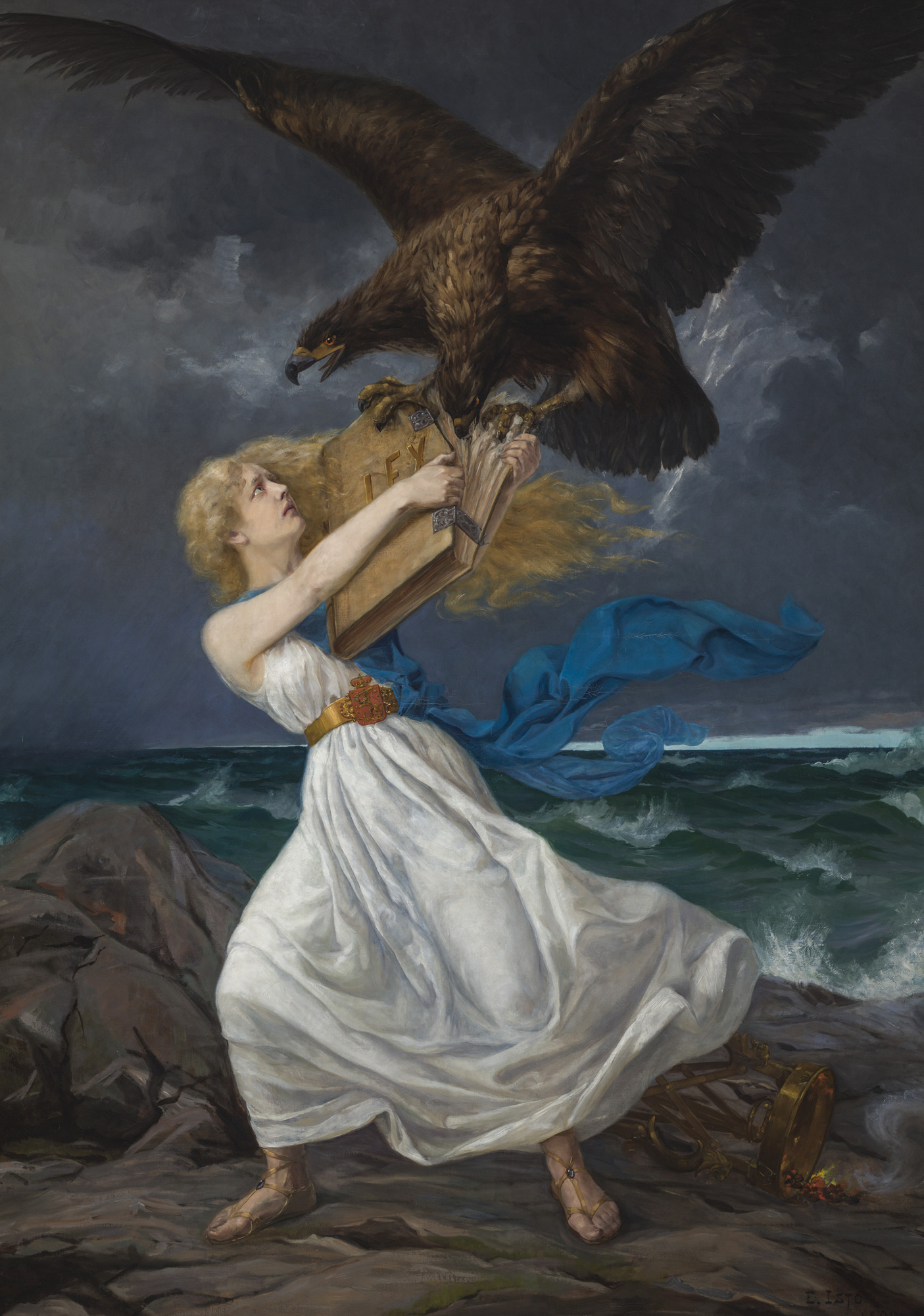
Edvard Isto's painting The Attack (1899) symbolizes the beginning of Finland's Russification. The two-headed eagle of Russia is tearing away the law book from the Finnish Maiden's arms.

The policy of Russification of Finland (Note: Finnish: sortokaudet / sortovuodet, lit. 'times/years of oppression'; Swedish: Förtrycksperioderna; Russian: Русификация Финляндии, romanized: Rusifikatsiya Finlyandii) was a governmental policy of the Russian Empire aimed at limiting the special status of the Grand Duchy of Finland and possibly the termination of its political autonomy and cultural uniqueness in 1899–1905 and in 1908–1917, fully integrating Finland to the Russian Empire. It was a part of a larger policy of Russification pursued by late 19th–early 20th century Russian governments which tried to abolish cultural and administrative autonomy of non-Russian minorities within the empire.

The two Russification campaigns evoked widespread Finnish resistance, starting with petitions and escalating to strikes, passive resistance (including draft resistance) and eventually active resistance. Finnish opposition to Russification was one of the main factors that ultimately led to Finland's declaration of independence in 1917.

== Background ==
After Napoleon's victory over the Russian Empire in the June 1807 Battle of Friedland, tsar Alexander I was forced to sue for peace with the First French Empire in the Treaties of Tilsit (7 July 1807). Alexander agreed to join the Continental System against the British Empire, to launch the Anglo-Russian War (1807–1812), and to force Sweden (which maintained extensive trade relations with the British) to join the Continental System as well. Swedish king Gustav IV Adolf delayed his response to Alexander's ultimatum until he brokered an alliance with Britain in February 1808, after which he rejected Alexander's demands. In response, Imperial Russia invaded Swedish Finland in what later became known as the Finnish War (21 February 1808 – 17 September 1809), which ended favourably for Alexander.

In 1809, the lost territory of Sweden became the Grand Duchy of Finland, an autonomous part of the Russian Empire. The Diet of Porvoo (later the Diet of Finland) recognized Alexander I of Russia as grand duke on 29 March 1809. For his part, Alexander confirmed the rights of the Finns, in particular, promising freedom to pursue their customs and religion and to maintain their identity:

Providence having placed us in possession of the Grand Duchy of Finland, we have desired by the present act to confirm and ratify the religion and the fundamental laws of the land, as well as the privileges and rights which each class in the said Grand Duchy in particular, and all the inhabitants in general, be their position high or low, have hitherto enjoyed according to the constitution. We promise to maintain all these benefits and laws firm and unshaken in their full force.

This meant that the old Swedish instrument of government from 1772 and the Union and Security Act from 1789 continued to be used in regards to the Finnish form of government. It also meant that the Swedish Civil Code of 1734 continued as the fundamental law of Finland.

== Under Imperial Russia ==
=== 1809–1881 ===
This promise was maintained; indeed, Alexander II amplified the powers of the Finnish diet in 1869. Finland enjoyed prosperity and control over their own affairs, and remained loyal subjects for nearly a century.

=== First period of Russification ===
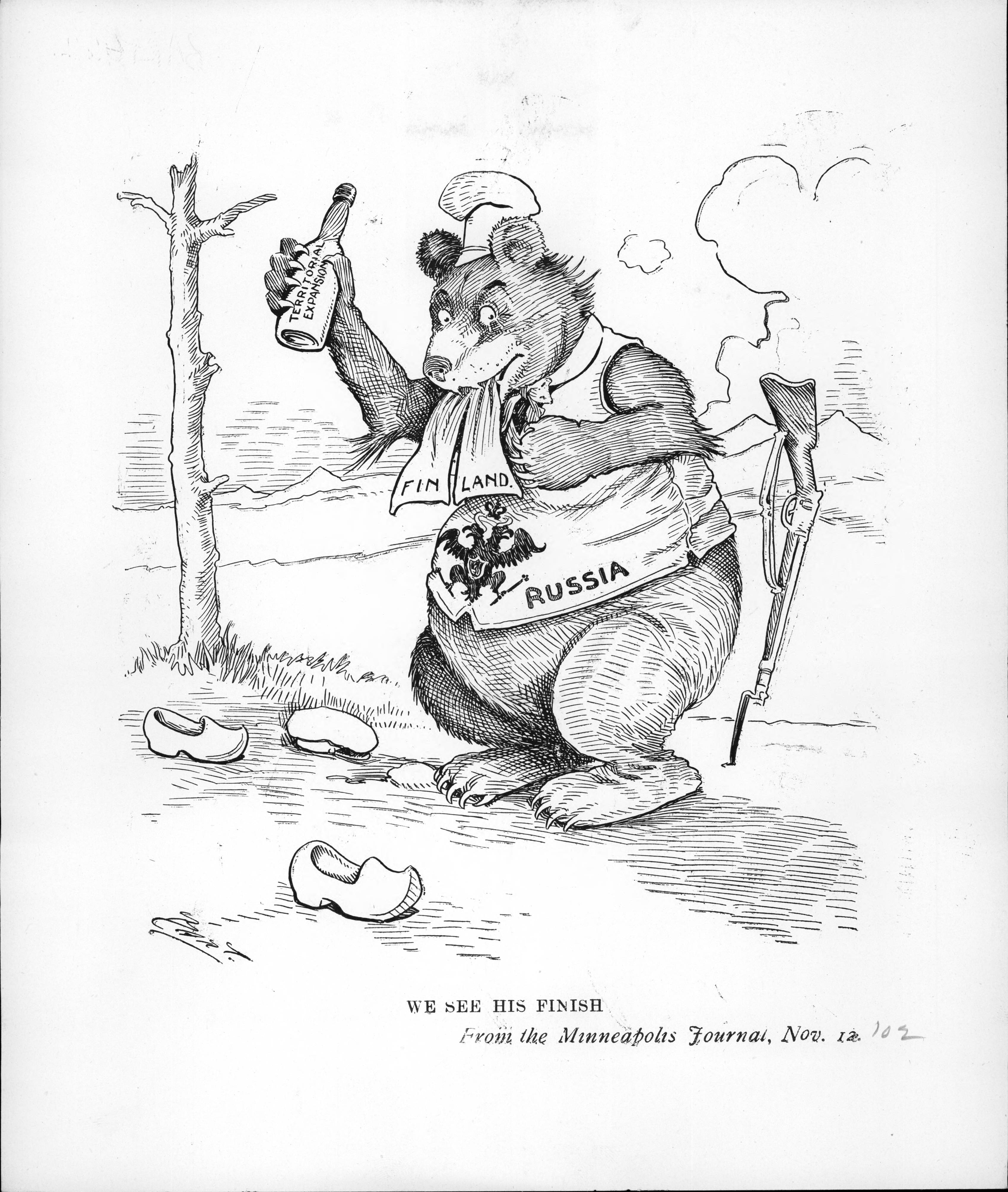
American political cartoon depicting the Russian Bear eating Finland with Territorial Expansion sauce (1902)

The manifesto which Nicholas II issued on 15 February 1899 was cause for Finnish despair. (Note: The controversy concerning the reductions of Finnish autonomy is considered to already have begun in the early 1890s; see Woldemar von Daehn.) The manifesto was forced through the Finnish senate by the deciding vote of the senate president, an appointee of the tsar—and after the Governor-General of Finland, Nikolay Bobrikov, had threatened a military invasion and siege. While ostensibly affirming the Finns' rights in purely local matters, the manifesto asserted the authority of the state in any and all matters which could be considered to "come within the scope of the general legislation of the empire".

As a response to the manifesto, a petition with 523,000 names was gathered and a delegation of 500 people were sent to deliver it to the tsar. A separate petition called Pro Finlandia that contained the names of 1,050 prominent foreign people was also gathered few months later.

Russification policies enacted included:

- The above-mentioned February Manifesto of 1899, the decree by Emperor Nicholas II which asserted the imperial government's right to rule Finland without the consent of local legislative bodies, under which:
  - the Orthodox Russian Church's status was strengthened; including, for example, criminalizing the act of subjecting a follower of the Orthodox church to a Lutheran church service;
  - the press was subjected to tighter Russian censorship than before;
  - the Military of the Grand Duchy of Finland was made subject to Russian rules of military service.
- The Language Manifesto of 1900, a decree by Nicholas II which made Russian the language of administration of Finland (in 1900, there were an estimated 8,000 Russians in all of Finland, of a population of 2,700,000)—the Finns saw this as placing the Russian minority in charge.
- The conscription law, signed by Nicholas II in July 1901 incorporating the Finnish army into the Imperial Russian Army and forcing Finns to serve in Russian units.
- Finnish stamps were abolished and Russian stamps became the only ones allowed in January 1901.
- Some Finnish government offices, such as the Railway and Lighthouse Boards got new, Russian, staff.

From April 1903 until the Russian Revolution of 1905, the governor-general was granted dictatorial powers. Bobrikov used these powers to personally abolish several newspapers and to deport notable Finnish political leaders. In June 1904 Eugen Schauman assassinated Bobrikov. The imperial government responded with a purge of opponents of Russification within the Finnish administration and more stringent censorship. However the passive resistance campaign also had some successes, notably a de facto reversal of the new conscription law.

The Russification campaign was suspended and partially reversed in 1905–1907 during a period of civil unrest throughout the Russian Empire following Russian defeats in the Russo-Japanese War.

=== Second period of Russification ===
The program was reintroduced in 1908, costing Finland much of its autonomy and again causing further Finnish resistance, including the Jäger movement. During 1909–1917 the Finnish politicians in the Senate of Finland were replaced by Finnish-born officers of the Russian army who were formally subjects of the grand duchy, creating the so-called admiral-senate or saber-senate. Russia demanded higher payments for not conscripting Finns (issue of sotilasmiljoonat, "military millions"). The 1910 "Law of all-Empire legislation procedures" removed most Finnish legislative powers from the newly established Finnish Parliament to the Russian Duma and State Council. In 1912 they passed the "Law of equality" which opened all Finnish government and civil service offices to Russians.

Many measures were again suspended in 1914–1917 during the First World War, but secret government documents published in the Finnish press in November 1914 suggested that the imperial government still harbored plans for the complete Russification of Finland.

The second wave halted due to the February Revolution in Russia.

=== Japanese involvement ===
During the Russo-Japanese War, with financial aid from Japan, Finnish rebels bought a shipment of thousands of rifles with the aim of creating an uprising and forming an independent state. However, the ship was wrecked off the coast of Finland and the plan failed. During the First World War, when Russia and Japan were allies fighting against Germany, the Japanese handed the Russian government a list of the leading men in the freedom movement (now in World War I working with Germany).

== See also ==
- Russification
- February Manifesto
- Kagal (Finnish society)
- Great Wrath
- Finlandization
