= Kurikka (magazine) =

Satirical magazine published in Finland (1904–1954)

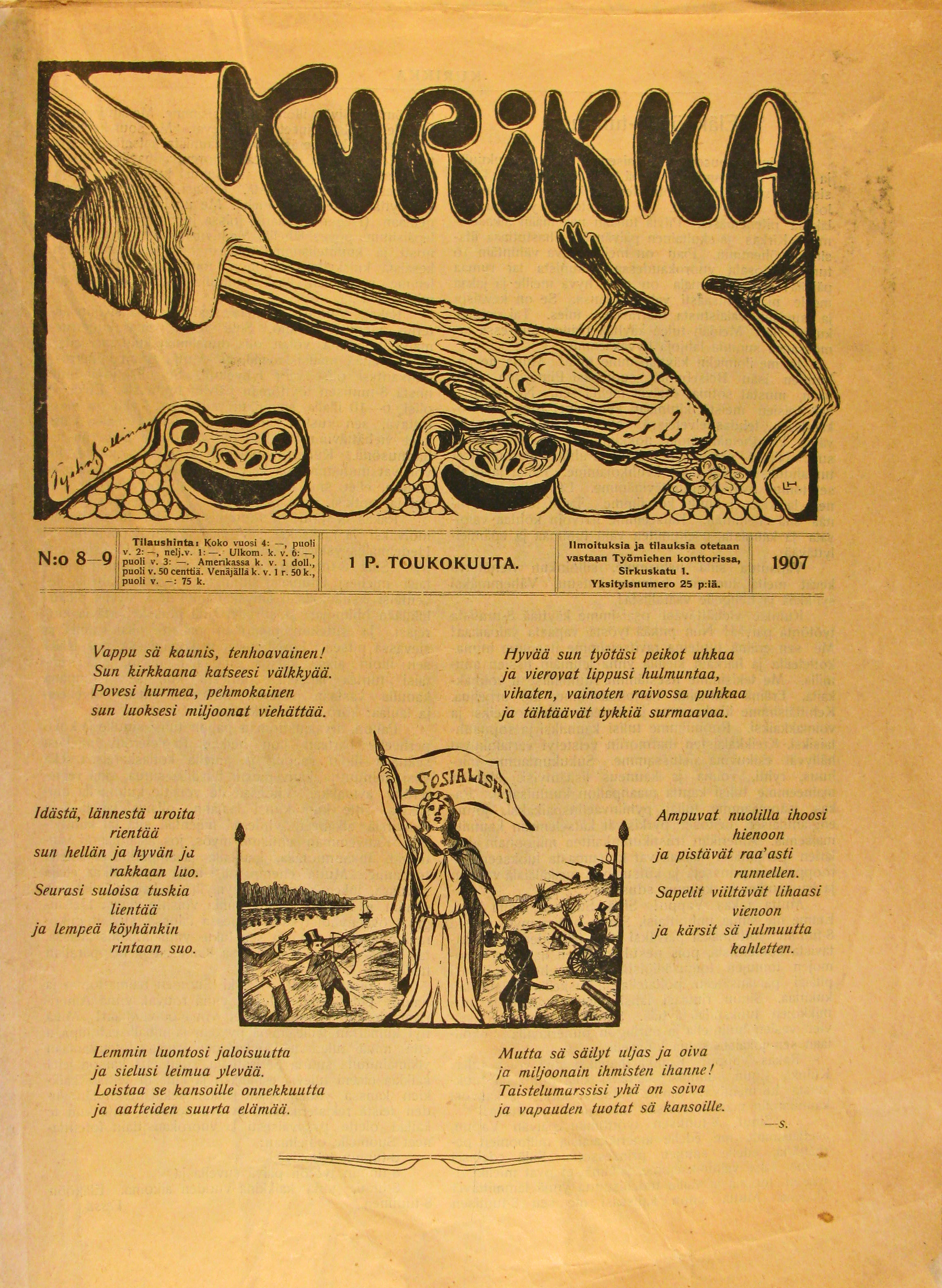
- Cover page dated 1907
- Categories: Satirical magazine
- Founded: 1904
- Final issue: 1954
- Country: Finland
- Based in: Helsinki
- Language: Finnish

Kurikka was a Finnish language socialist publication headquartered in Helsinki, Finland. It was started as a labor newspaper in 1904, but then was relaunched as an illustrated satirical magazine which was in circulation until 1954.

== History and profile ==
Kurikka was founded as a newspaper in Helsinki in 1904. It was affiliated with labor movement. Soon after its start it was redesigned as an illustrated satirical magazine.

Although it had a socialist stance, its cartoonists also included non-socialist figures, including Eric Vasström and Hjalmar Löfvin. The magazine employed the Old Helsinki slang in the satirical materials. Kurikka was blamed by its opponents for targeting the bourgeoisie. However, before the civil war in Finland in 1918 the magazine declared its enemies as bourgeoisie, capitalists and gentlemen. At the end of the civil war the magazine's affiliation changed in that Kurikka became closer to the Social Democratic Party in 1923 due to the split in the labor movement.

Kurikka enjoyed higher levels of circulation in the 1920s and 1930s. Although its competitors Fyren and Tuulispää sold only 3,000–4,000 copies, Kurikka managed to sell 20,000 copies. The magazine ceased publication in 1954.
