= Great Russification program =

The "great Russification program" was a plan for new laws concerning the Grand Duchy of Finland made during the second period of oppression from 1912 to 1914, which would have set Finland even deeper under the control of the government of the Russian Empire and significantly suppressed its autonomy, had it ever come into force. This secret plan leaked into the public in November 1914, which caused fear in Finland of losing the country's autonomy and of Russification.

== Background and preparation ==
Pyotr Stolypin, Prime Minister of Russia from 1906 to 1911 was a nationalist and a staunch supporter of concentration of power, who wanted to discontinue most of Finland's autonomy. Under his term, a law of nationwide legislature was made against the Finns' will, which made it possible for the Russian legislative bodies to enact laws concerning Finland without the approval of the Diet of Finland. However, the Russian government did not have a ready-made plan as to how it would use this opportunity. Governor-General of Finland Franz Albert Seyn sent a letter to Stolypin in 1910, where he listed six things required for new laws in Finland: a bureau of officials, court treatment of crimes against the state, the news press, union legislation, the police and the gendarmerie, and the position of the Russian language. Stolypin's government decided to propose a committee to prepare a detailed program of the needed laws. The Emperor Nicholas II of Russia appointed a committee in January 1912, at which time Stolypin was already dead and had been succeeded by the more benign Vladimir Kokovtsov.

The director of the secret preparation committee was the real state official Nikolay Korevo. He had already previously led the "committee for the systematisation of Finnish laws" at the Russian State Council as the successor of professor Nikolay Sergeyevsky. Korevo's committee had a total of 24 members, of which 23 represented different branches of the Russian government. The only representative of the Grand Duchy of Finland was the procurator of the "admiralty senate" Alexey Hozyainov, who also was Russian by ethnicity. The committee first met in late April 1912. It decided to enact a program for all laws necessary for the protection of the interests of Russia and its governing authority in Finland regardless of whether they were general state laws.

== Content ==
The program prepared by Korevo's committee was officially named "a sketch for a program of law proposals to be enacted in the Grand Duchy of Finland". It contained three parts: protection of the authority and control of the Russian government in Finland, protection of the interests of the Russian armed forces and bringing Finland closer to the Russian Empire in political and economical terms. The program had a total of 38 points. Proposed actions included the discontinuation of Finland's own customs and money, discontinuation of Finnish nationality, integrating some of Finland's government offices directly into the Russian ministries, improving the position of the Orthodox Church, facilitation of the Russian money authority and further development of the equality law of 1912. Some of these actions had already been under work for a long time. The program also included social goals, such as improving the situation of the steadless public with affordable acquisition of land and expanding the activity of the Peasants' Land Bank into Finland. The new Parliament of Finland and older Senate of Finland, core parts of the autonomy of Finland, could continue operation.

== Publicity ==
The existence of the secret committee already came to public knowledge in summer 1912, when one of its meeting documents was leaked to the press. The committee finished its program in March 1913. It was discussed at the second committee led by prime minister Ivan Goremykin in May 1914, when its first version was leaked to the public. It was first published by the Russian newspaper Novoye Vremya on 6 May 1914 and on the next day by numerous Finnish newspapers. Nicholas II signed the final version of the program in September 1914. World War I prevented it from being taken into action, but it was later fully leaked to the public and was published in the Swedish language newspapers in Helsinki on 17 November 1914. At this point the Finns named it the "great Russification program".

In Finland, the goal of the program was seen as the total eradication of Finnish autonomy and Russification of Finland. Even though the program was never taken into action, mere knowledge of its existence caused a strong negative reaction in Finland. The "treasury meeting", which signalled the foundation of the Jäger Movement, was held in Helsinki on 20 November 1914, only three days after the program was leaked to the public.
