= 2003 in Nordic music =

The following is a list of notable events and releases that happened in Nordic music in 2003.

== Events ==
- 3 January – At the Finnish Metal Music Awards held at Tavastia Club in Helsinki, death metal band Children of Bodom was awarded Finnish Band of the Year.
- 11 April – Kåre Opheim is awarded the Vossajazzprisen 2003 on the first day of the Vossajazz festival in Norway.
- 24 May – The 48th Eurovision Song Contest takes place in Riga, Latvia. The highest-placed Scandinavian country is Norway in fourth. Sweden finishes fifth and Iceland eighth. Denmark and Finland do not participate.
- 14 June – Finnish guitarist Alexander Kuoppala leaves Children of Bodom in the middle of a tour. He is eventually replaced by Roope Latvala.
- August
  - After the Belgian music association SABAM decides that Sweden's 2001 Eurovision entry "Listen to Your Heartbeat" plagiarised an earlier Belgian entry, "Liefde is een kaartspel", an accusation denied by songwriters Thomas G:son and Henrik Sethsson, the Swedish delegation settles out of court.
  - Vocalist Marco Aro leaves Swedish band The Haunted, to be replaced by the band's original vocalist, Peter Dolving.
- 11 December – The Nobel Peace Prize Concert is held at the Oslo Spektrum. Stars include Craig David, The Cardigans and Jan Werner Danielsen.
- date unknown – Norwegian folk metal band Trollfest is founded by John Espen Sagstad (Mr.Seidel) and Jostein Austvik (Trollmannen).

== Classical works ==
- Victoria Borisova-Ollas – The Kingdom of Silence
- Sampo Haapamäki – Signature for chamber orchestra
- Hafliði Hallgrímsson – Cello Concerto
- Frederik Magle – Phoenix for mixed choir and organ or piano four-hands
- Kaija Saariaho – Quatre instants

== Film/TV scores ==
- Halfdan E – Arven
- Thomas Knak – Reconstruction
- Anders Matthesen – Jul på Vesterbro

== Popular music ==
- Julie Berthelsen – "Every Little Part of Me" (#2 Denmark)
- Dina – "Bli hos meg"
- Fame – Give Me Your Love" (#1 Sweden)
- Jostein Hasselgård – "I'm Not Afraid to Move On"
- Birgitta Haukdal – "Segðu mér allt"
- Lene Marlin – "You Weren't There" (#1 Norway, Italy)
- Kurt Nilsen – "She's So High" (#1 Norway)
- The Rasmus – "In the Shadows" (#1 Finland, Germany, Hungary; #2 Sweden, Italy; #6 Denmark)
- Timo Rautiainen & Trio Niskalaukaus – "Tiernapojat" (#1 Finland)

== Eurovision Song Contest ==
- Iceland in the Eurovision Song Contest 2003
- Norway in the Eurovision Song Contest 2003
- Sweden in the Eurovision Song Contest 2003

== Births ==
- 23 January – Bishara, Syrian-born Swedish singer
- 11 April – Aksel Rykkvin, Norwegian singer

== Deaths ==
- 1 February – Bodil Kjer, Danish actress and occasional singer (born 1917)
- 16 March – Teemu "Somnium" Raimoranta, Finnish guitarist, founding member of Finntroll (born 1977; injuries from a fall)
- 31 March – Tommy Seebach, Danish singer, organist, pianist, composer and record producer (born 1949)
- 9 April – Vera Zorina, German-born Norwegian ballerina, choreographer and musical theatre star (born 1917)
- 5 June – Ola Calmeyer, Norwegian jazz pianist (born 1930)
- 16 August – Gösta Sundqvist, Finnish musician and radio personality (born 1957; heart attack)
- 17 November – Peter Lindroos, Finnish operatic tenor (born 1944; car accident)
- 27 December – Ingeborg Cook, US-born Norwegian actress and singer (born 1915)
