= Mauno Rosendal =

Finnish educator and politician (1848–1917)

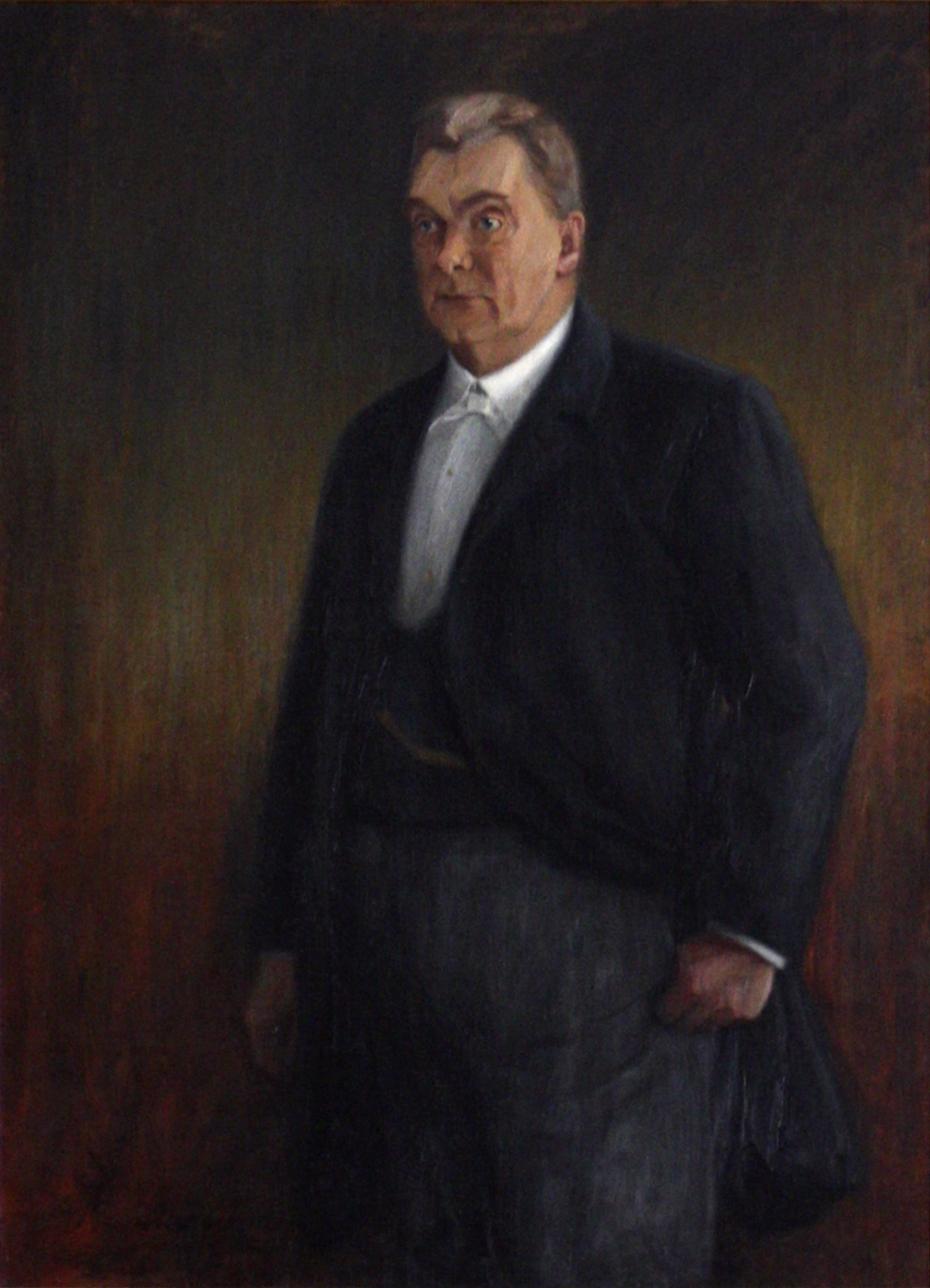
Mauno Rosendal by Eetu Isto (1902)

Magnus (Mauno) Rosendal (8 September 1848 – 21 October 1917) was a Finnish educator and politician, born in Hämeenkyrö. He was a member of the Diet of Finland from 1905 to 1906 and of the Parliament of Finland from 1908 to 1909, representing the Young Finnish Party.
