= The Attack (painting) =

1899 painting by Edvard Isto

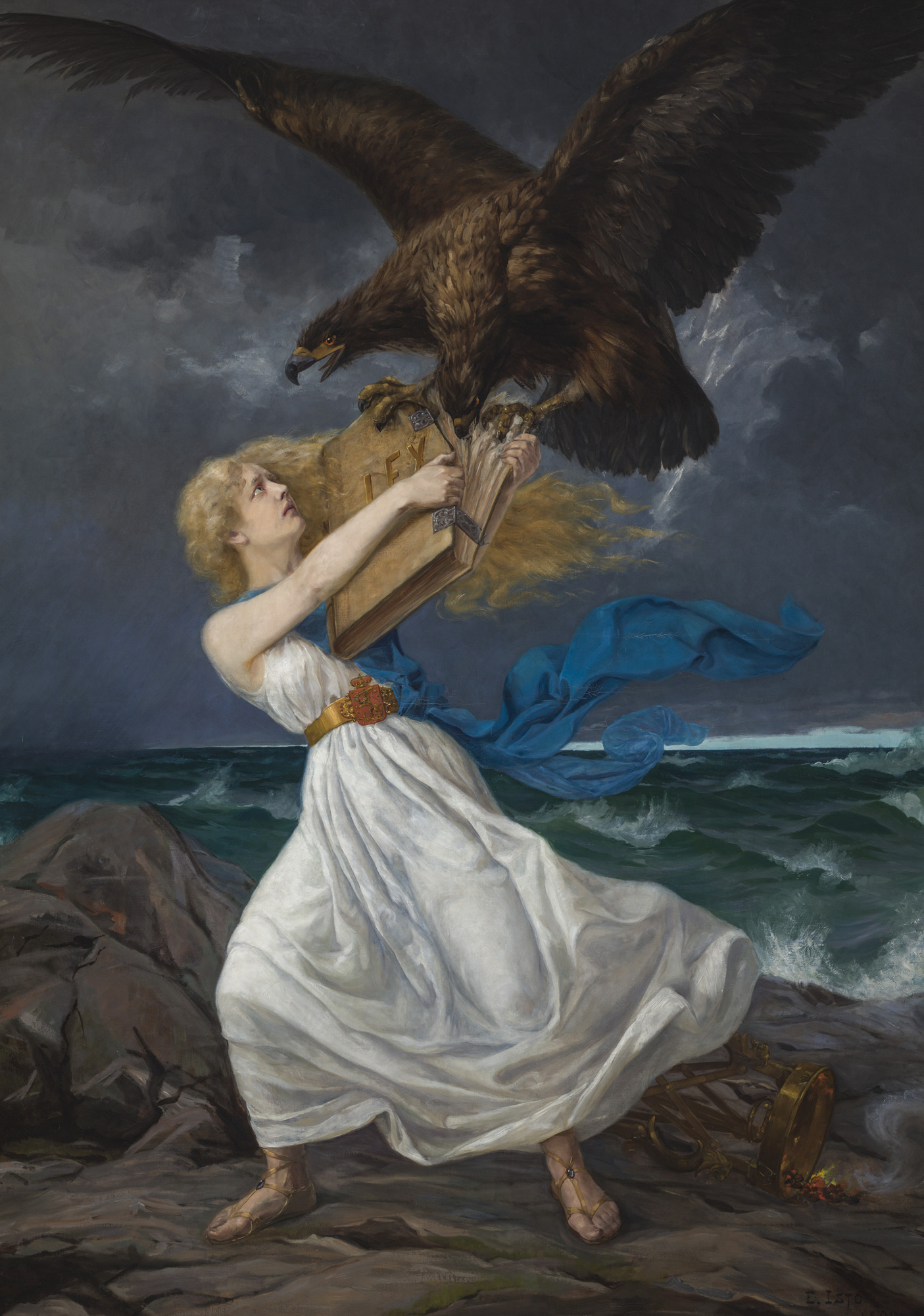
The Attack

The Attack (Finnish: Hyökkäys) is a painting by the Finnish artist Edvard Isto, one of the most famous Finnish paintings. The painting represents the Russian double-headed eagle attacking the Finnish Maiden trying to rob her of her book of laws. The painting was completed in 1899, the same year when emperor Nicholas II of Russia gave his publication known as the February Manifesto. The name of the painting was suggested by Emmi Ajo, wife of Isto's good friend Benjamin Ajo. The Attack spread as prints all over Finland. Isto had thousands of prints made of his painting in both Finland and Germany.

The model for the painting was Emma Kyöstäjä, who was from Alatornio like Isto himself. In autumn 1899 the painting was displayed in secret at a beach villa in Kaivopuisto in Helsinki. The Tilgmann press made at least a couple hundred prints of it. After the gendarmerie learned of the painting Isto escaped to Germany via Sweden with the painting and its prints, where the Berlin press Meissenbach & Rippart had over ten thousand rotogravure photographic reproductions of 48 × 37.5 cm (picture size 30 × 21.5 cm) made of it. At least six editions of postcards were also made of the painting, one even with texts in Russian. Alex Federley made a postcard variation of the painting, where the double-headed eagle has given up and left the Finnish Maiden alone with her book of laws.

In 1900 Isto took the painting to the Alatornio clergy house, until it had to be taken to Sweden again to be safe. A couple of years later Isto tried to get rid of the painting by selling lottery tickets, but the Helsinki woman who won the painting dared not accept it. So Isto bought the painting back from her and sold it to a Swedish businessman from Luleå, who later gave it to the municipal official Niilo Helander in Heinola. His widow donated the painting to the Finnish Heritage Agency.

== See also ==
- Finnish nationalism
