= Edvard Isto =

Finnish painter (1865–1905)

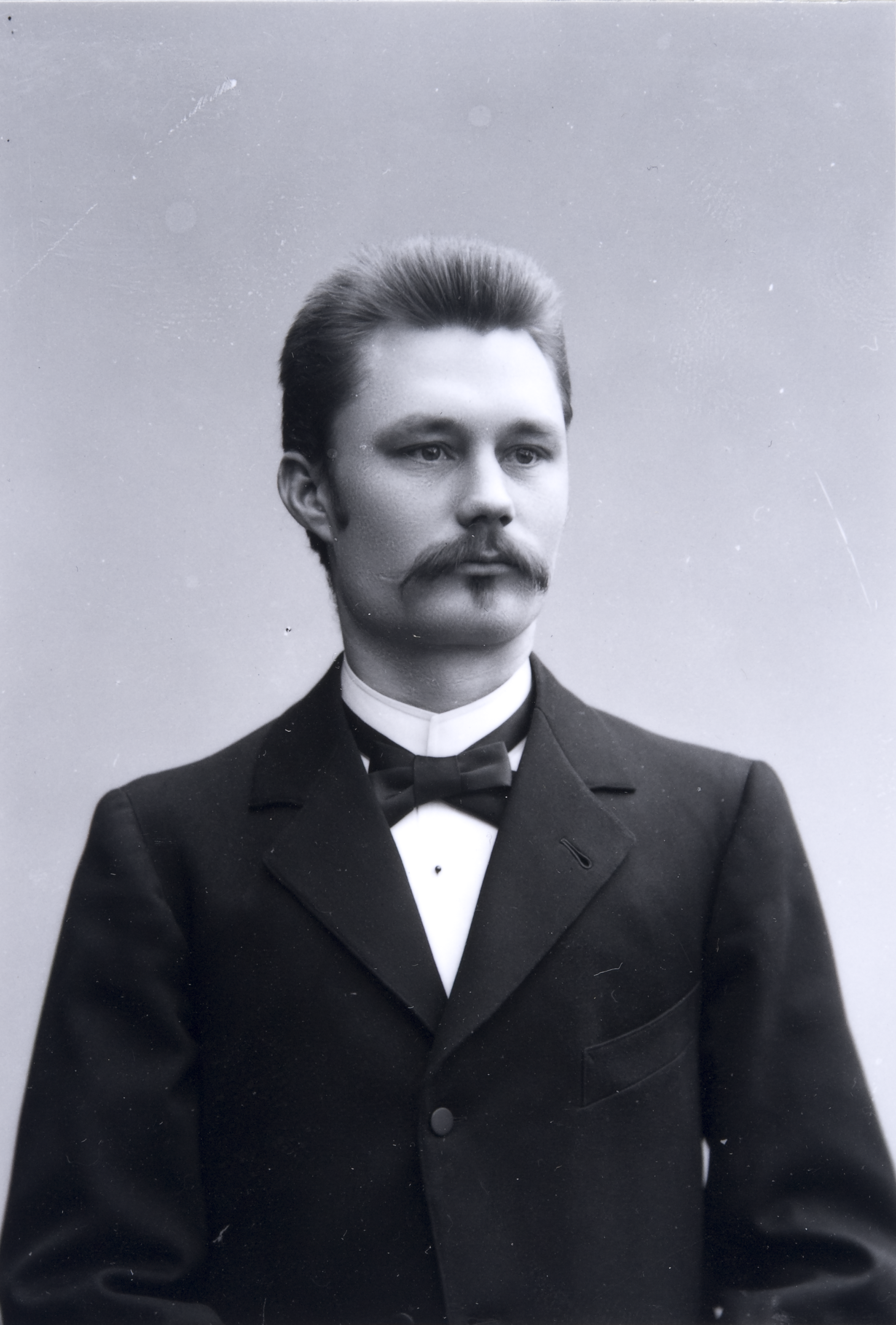
- Photograph by Daniel Nyblin (1894)
- Born: 28 November 1865; Alatornio, Grand Duchy of Finland, Russian Empire
- Died: 14 October 1905 (aged 39); Helsinki, Grand Duchy of Finland, Russian Empire

Edvard Isto, or Eetu Isto (28 November 1865 – 14 October 1905) was a Finnish artist, best known for his patriotic painting The Attack which depicts the perceived Russification of Finland by the Russian Empire. The work was widely reproduced in its original form and in variations.

== Biography ==
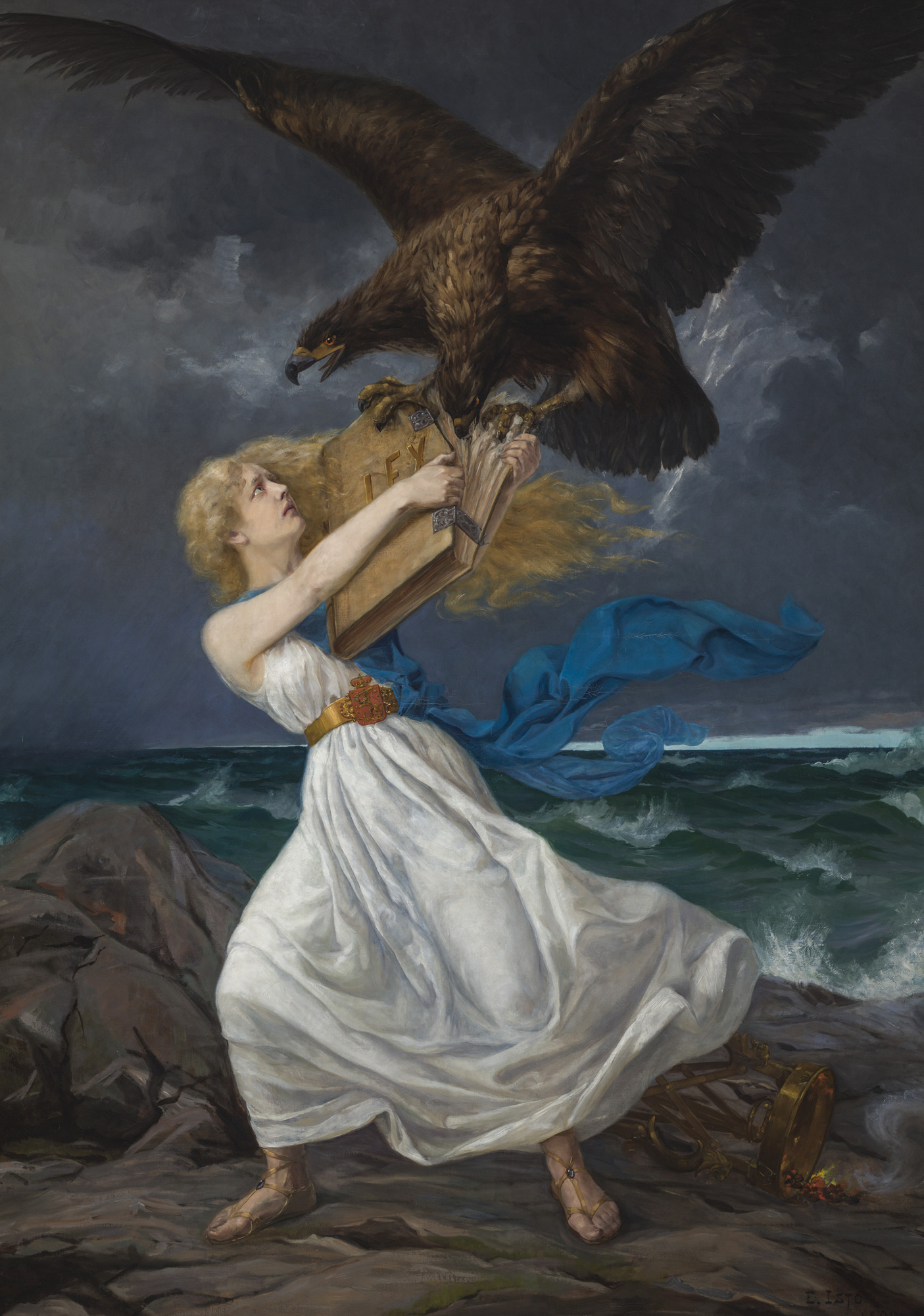
The Attack (Hyökkäys), 1899

He was the youngest of nine children born to a family of farmers, to Jaakob and Kaisa Liisa Isto, and the only one who attended school; the nearest of which was six kilometres away. Even so, he was unable to continue beyond the elementary grades, because the nearest secondary school was too far away, in Oulu. When he turned eighteen, he went to Övertorneå, in Sweden, to work at a decorating company owned by one of his cousins.

He moved to Helsinki in 1888, where he studied art and design at what is now the "Aalto University School of Arts, Design and Architecture", but could only advance so far, due to his lack of education. Meanwhile, he supported himself by painting and decorating. Among others, he worked for the architect Karl August Wrede. After this experience, he was able to return to the School of Arts and complete his studies. He may have attended some classes at the Academy of Fine Arts, and began producing his first canvases.

In 1895, he applied for and received a government grant that enabled him to travel to Berlin, where he studied at the Prussian Academy of the Arts. Although he was forced to support himself by house painting and decorating again, he had more time to devote to serious work, especially portraits.

== The Attack ==
While studying in Berlin, in response to the Russification of Finland, he painted The Attack (Hyökkäys) which shows the Russian eagle attacking the Finnish Maiden. He took it back to Helsinki and displayed it privately at a villa in Kaivopuisto. It may, in fact, have been completed there, as the Maiden resembles the wife of one of Isto's friends. It was reproduced and distributed by the thousands throughout Finland, Germany and Sweden, despite efforts to suppress it.

After a brief return to Berlin, he settled in Alatornio in 1901 where he was a guest of the local vicar and continued to paint portraits; the best-known being that of the politician and educator Mauno Rosendal. In 1902, however, during a political purge, the vicar was exiled to Siberia. Three years later, Isto accompanied two of the vicar's sons on a visit there and contracted typhoid fever during the journey. He returned to Finland, but his health was failing and he died of pneumonia shortly after his arrival. In 1936, his grave in Alatornio was decorated with a sculpture based on his famous painting.
