= Tuulispää =

Satirical magazine published in Finland (1903–1957)

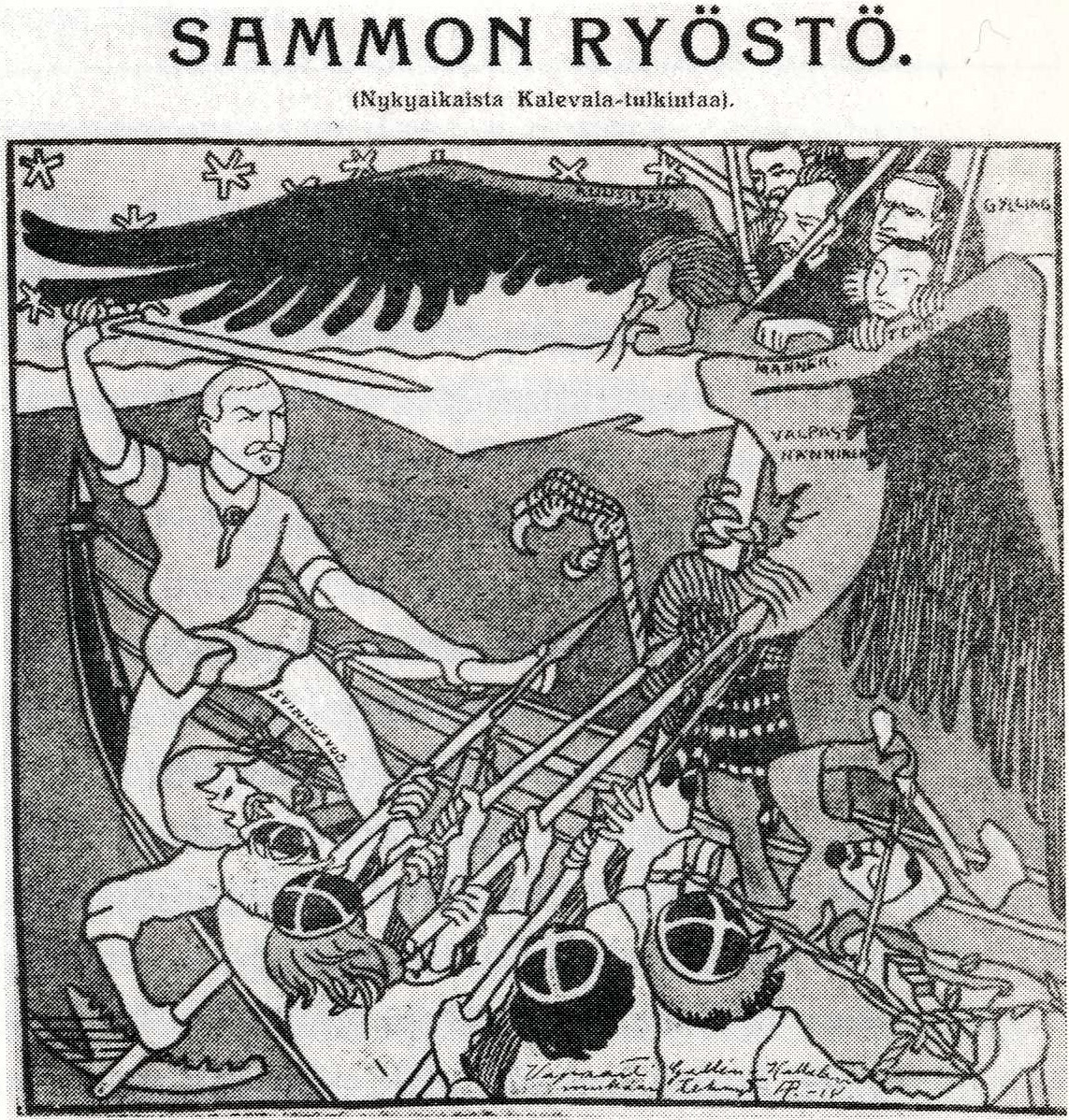
- A page from Tuulispää about the Finnish civil war
- Categories: Satirical magazine
- Founded: 1903
- Final issue: 1957
- Country: Finland
- Based in: Helsinki
- Language: Finnish

Tuulispää was a satirical magazine which existed between 1903 and 1957. It was the media outlet of conservative nationalism in Finland. However, the magazine described itself as a representative of genuine satire and humor without any party affiliation.

== History and profile ==
Tuulispää was started in 1903 as a successor of Matti Meikäläinen, another satirical magazine which was closed by Governor General Bobrikov in Summer 1899. Although the magazine claimed that it had a political stance, it also declared that it had no political party affiliation. Tuulispää was close to the Finnish-speaking Fennoman groups consisting of small landowners and independent farmers. This group was one of the active factions involving in the discussions about the Finnishness, Finnish culture and Finnish identity. The magazine adopted a conservative nationalist political stance criticising the Finnish labour movement and the Swedish-speaking elite in the country. It also attempted to create a balance between the National Coalition Party and the National Progressive Party. Some of the contributors included Topi Vikstedt, Oscar Furuhjelm and Eric Vasström.

Tuulispää used the Old Helsinki slang during the initial period of its publication. Its rival was Fyren, another satirical magazine which was printed in Swedish. However, the same writers contributed to both titles.

In the 1920s and 1930s Tuulispää had a steady circulation selling 3,000-4,000 copies. The magazine folded in 1957.
