= Yrjö Nurmio =

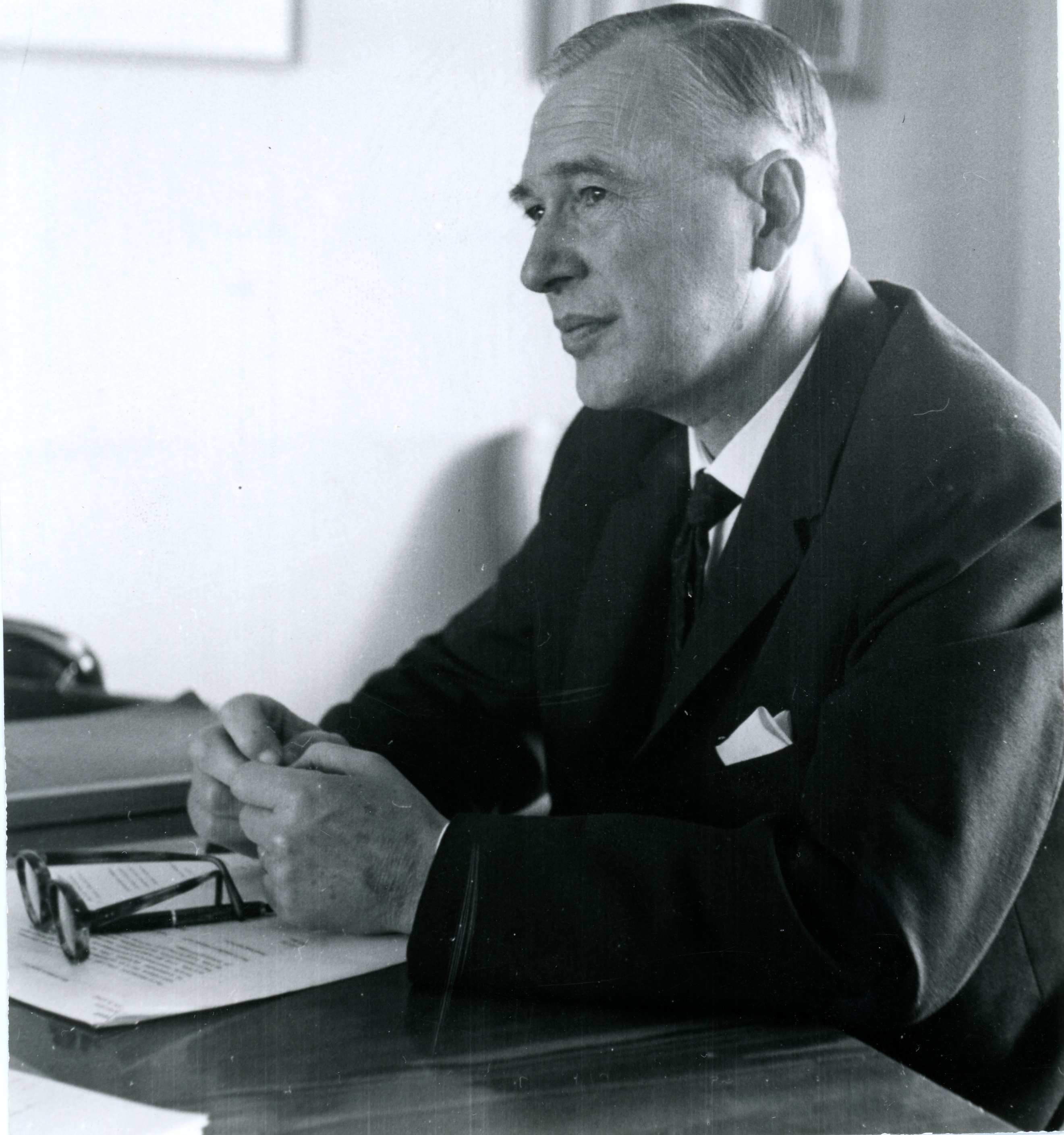
Yrjö Nurmio in 1967.

Yrjö Fredrik Nurmio (29 April 1901 in Raisio – 15 June 1983 in Helsinki) was director of the National Archives of Finland 1949–67 and an acting professor in history in 1949. In 1949 he also received the honorary title of professor. He was a brother to Heikki Nurmio.

In his historical research Nurmio has foremost treated censorship in Finland and the position of the Finnish language during Russian rule 1809–1917. The censor ordinance of 1850 forbade publication of literature other than spiritual and economical. The Finnish people was not to take part in writings that was critical to the society.

He wrote a book about it in 1947 where he tried to find out if it was Finnish or Russian officials that created the ordinance.

Nurmio has even treated the relationship between Finland and Germany 1917–1918 in (Suomen itsenäistyminen ja Saksa, 1957).
