= Hiski Salomaa =

Finnish-American songwriter (1891–1957)

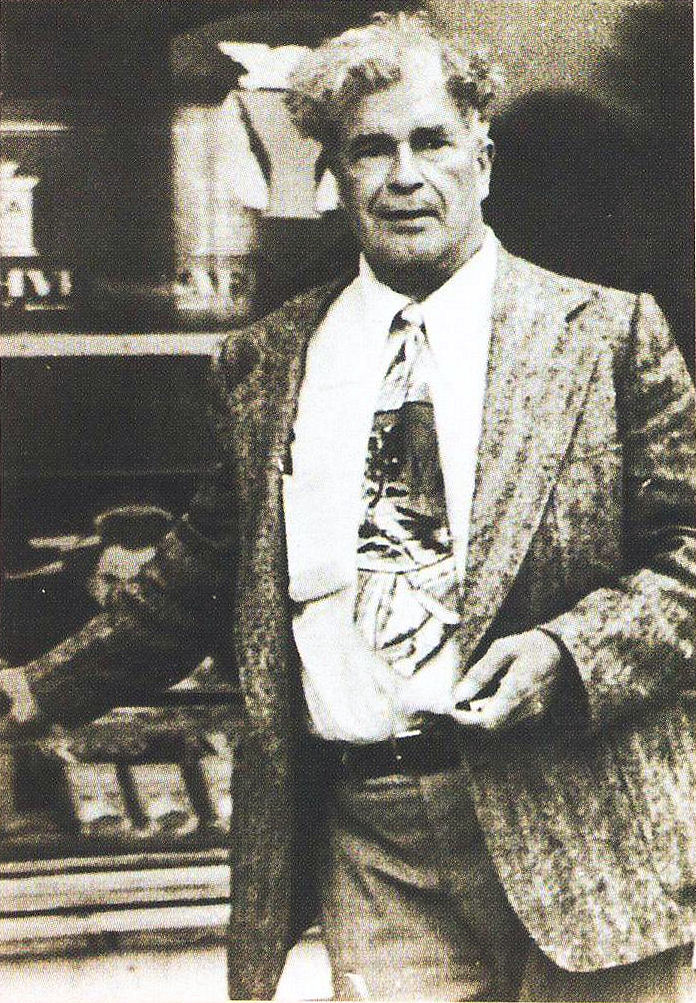
- "The Finnish Woody Guthrie"
- Born: Hiskias Möttö; May 17, 1891; Kangasniemi, Grand Duchy of Finland, Russian Empire
- Died: July 7, 1957 (aged 66); New York City, New York, U.S.
- Occupations: singer, songwriter, tailor, restaurateur
- Spouse: Aini Saari

Hiski Salomaa (born Hiskias Möttö; May 17, 1891 – July 7, 1957) was a Finnish-American singer and songwriter.

== Career ==
Referred to as the Finnish Woody Guthrie, Salomaa's songs portrayed the immigrant experience of working-class Finns.

Between 1927 and 1931 Salomaa recorded eighteen sides for Columbia Records.

Since the 1970s, Hiski Salomaa's recordings have been reissued in both analog and digital formats. In 1992 his song "Värssyjä sieltä ja täältä" (Verses from Here and There) was published in Mel Bay’s Immigrant Songbook, an American songbook with lyrics in both Finnish and English.
