= Finnish Maiden =

National personification of Finland

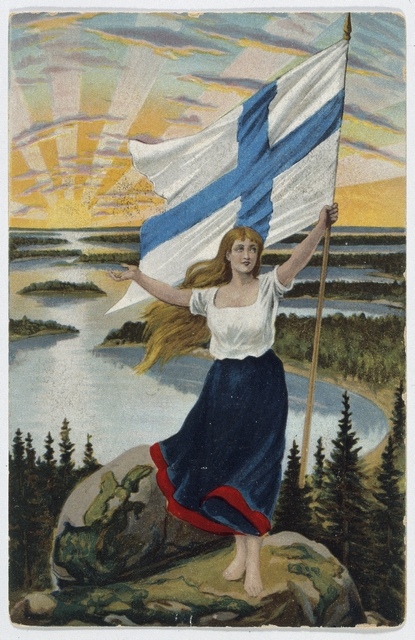
The Finnish Maiden on a 1906 postcard.

The Maiden of Finland (Finnish: Suomi-neito [ˈsuo̯miˌnei̯to], Swedish: Finlands mö) is the national personification of Finland.

== Personification ==
She is a barefoot young woman in her mid-twenties with blonde hair, blue eyes, wearing a blue and white national costume or a white dress. She was originally called Aura after the Aura River in Turku.

As a symbol, the Finnish Maiden has been used since the 19th century when she was pictured as a woman wearing a turreted crown, and then developing as Finland gained a national consciousness and independence. She was depicted in poetry and fine arts. Zachris Topelius and Walter Runeberg were important in establishing the Finnish Maiden as a symbol. Like the Mother Svea of neighbouring Sweden, the Finnish maiden was, at first, a mature woman, but gradually became younger.

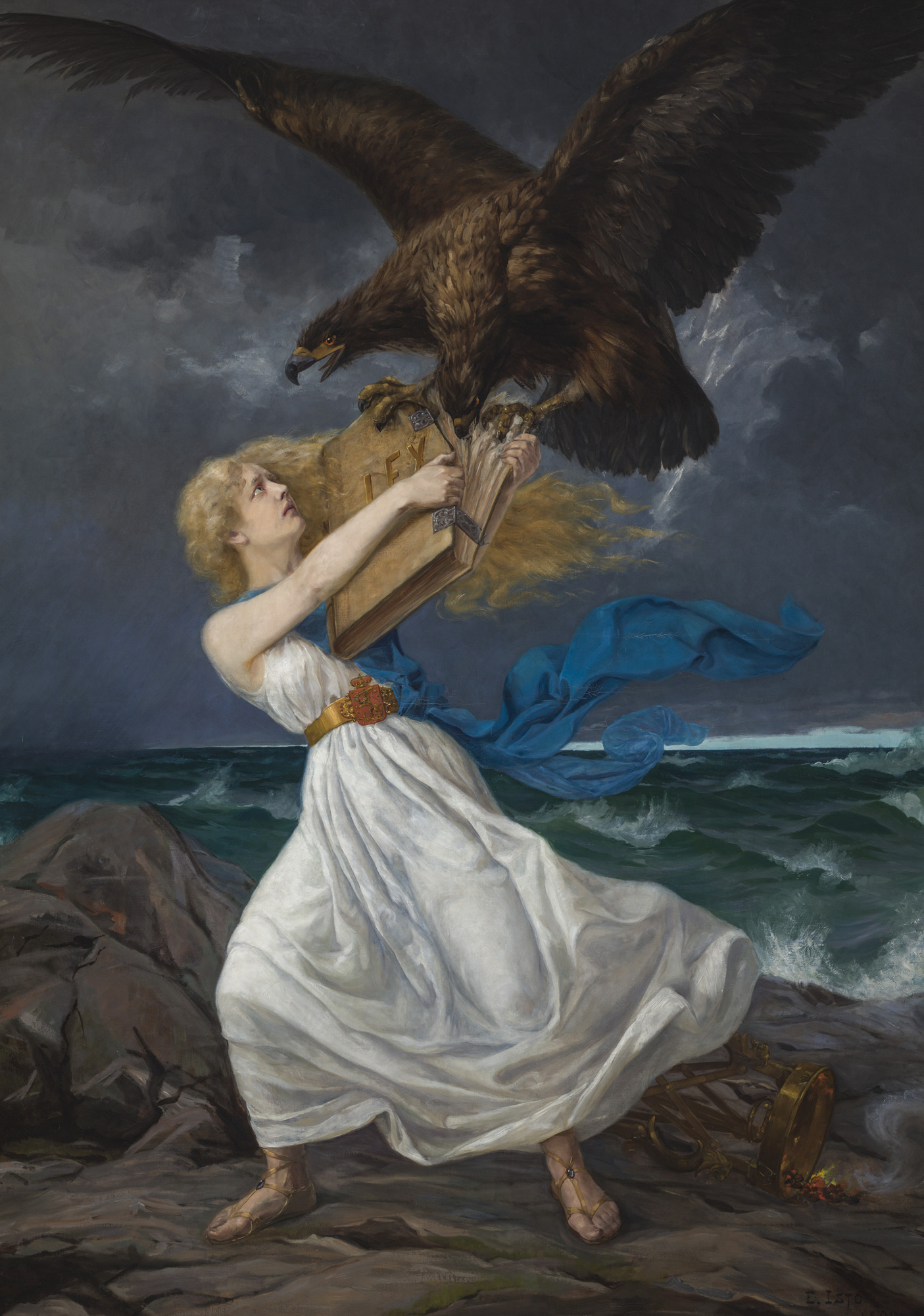
In the painting The Attack by Edvard Isto, the Finnish Maiden is being attacked by the Russian eagle, which is tearing away the law book from her hands. It was painted when the Russification of Finland started in 1899.

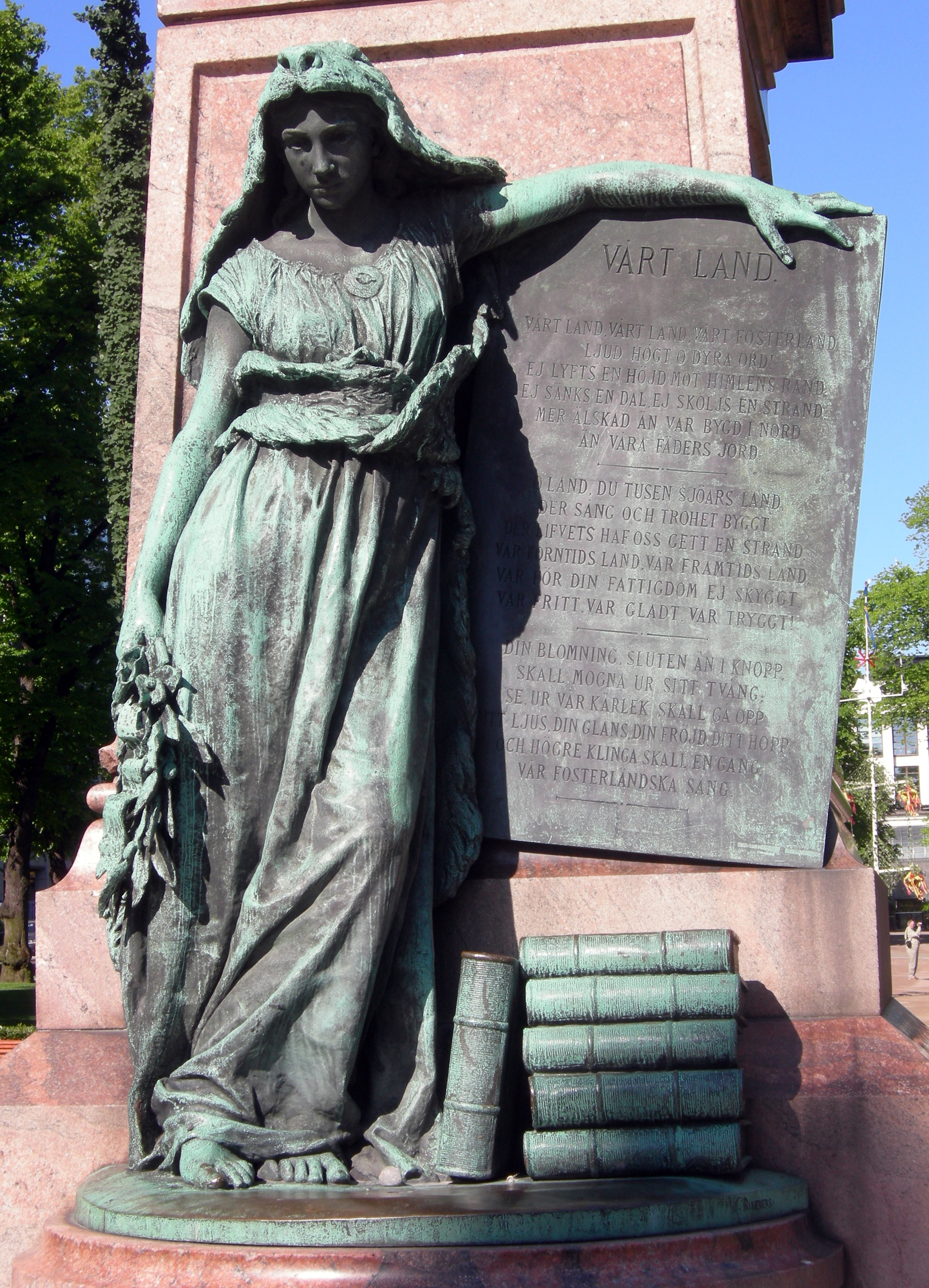
Finnish Maiden carrying the lyrics of Vårt land in front of the Statue of Johan Ludvig Runeberg.

== See also ==
- Suomen Neito
