= Jäger March =

1917 composition by Jean Sibelius

- Military march by Jean Sibelius
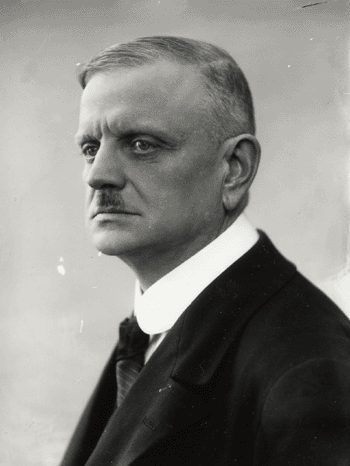
- Sibelius in 1918
- Native name: "Jääkärimarssi"
- Opus: 91a
- Written: 1917
- Text: Heikki Nurmio
- Language: Finnish
- Performed: 19 January 1918: Helsinki
- Scoring: Men's chorus; piano; Men's chorus; orchestra

The "Jäger March" (Finnish: "Jääkärimarssi", originally "Jääkärien marssi"), Op. 91a, is a military march by Jean Sibelius. He set in 1917 words written by the Finnish Jäger, Hilfsgruppenführer Heikki Nurmio who served in Libau, in the Royal Prussian 27th Jäger Battalion of the Imperial German Army. This unit was fighting against the Russian Empire, of which the Grand Duchy of Finland still was a part. The words were smuggled into Finland to Sibelius, who composed the song in Järvenpää.

Sibelius wrote the "Jäger March" originally for men's chorus and piano, and later arranged it for men's chorus and symphony orchestra. Its public performance was in Helsinki on 19 January 1918 by the Akademiska Sångföreningen, led by Olof Wallin. The Finnish Civil War began on the same day between the White and the Red troops. The march is the honorary march of many army detachments such as the Lapland Military Band from Rovaniemi.

== Lyrics ==
Finnish translation	Literal English translation	Stylized English translation
First stanza
Syvä iskumme on, viha voittamaton, meil' armoa ei kotimaata. Koko onnemme kalpamme kärjessä on, ei rintamme heltyä saata. Sotahuutomme hurmaten maalle soi, mi katkovi kahleitansa. Kertosäe (×2): Ei ennen uhmamme uupua voi, kuin vapaa on Suomen kansa.	Deep is our blow, our wrath is invincible, We do not have mercy, nor a homeland. Our happiness is at the tip of our sword, our hearts will know no pity. Our battle cry in thrill will sound to the land, Which is cutting its chains. Chorus (×2): Our defiance will not be passed, Before the people of Finland shall be free.	Deep is our blow, our wrath is unbeatable, we have no mercy nor homeland. Our whole fortune is at the tip of our sword, our hearts will not be softened. Our war cry echoes through the land, breaking its chains. Chorus (×2): Our defiance will not fail until the Finnish people are free.
Second stanza
Kun painuvi päät muun kansan, maan, me jääkärit uskoimme yhä. Oli rinnassa yö, tuhat tuskaa, vaan yks' aatos ylpeä, pyhä: Me nousemme kostona Kullervon, soma on sodan kohtalot koittaa. Kertosäe (×2): Satu uusi nyt Suomesta syntyvä on, se kasvaa, se ryntää, se voittaa.	When the rest of the people and the land hung their heads we Jaegers still believed. In our chest we had the night, a thousand pains, but only one proud, holy thought: We will rise like the revenge of Kullervo, And we shall pass sweetly those destinies of the war. Chorus (×2); A new tale will be born now of Finland, it grows, it charges, it triumphs.	While other Finns and the land had given up hope, we Jägers still held strong. There was a night in our hearts, a thousand sorrows, but one proud, sacred conviction: We rise for revenge like Kullervo, to be beguiled by the fate of war. Chorus (×2); A new tale of Finland is now being born, it grows, it charges, it triumphs.
Third stanza
Häme, Karjala, Vienan rannat ja maa, yks' suuri on Suomen valta. Sen aatetta ei väkivoimat saa pois Pohjolan taivaan alta. Sen leijonalippua jääkärien käsivarret jäntevät kantaa, Kertosäe (×2): yli pauhun kenttien hurmeisten päin nousevan Suomen rantaa.	Over Tavastia, Karelia, the strand of Dvina, and the land, there's only one great Finland. Its ideal cannot be removed by sheer force away from under the Northern sky. Its Lion-flag is carried, by the strong hands of Jaegers, Chorus (×2): over the roar of bloody battlefields, to the rising shore of Finland.	Tavastia, Karelia, the shores of Dvina and the land, Finland's might knows no bounds. No force can take away its ideals from beneath the Northern sky. Its Lion flag is being carried by the strong arms of the Jägers, Chorus (×2); Over the thundering fields of bloody battles towards the rising shore of Finland.
