= Heikki Nurmio =

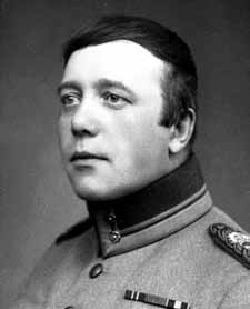
Heikki Nurmio

Heikki Nurmio (1887–1947) was a Finnish jäger and writer. He is remembered for writing the lyrics for "Jääkärien marssi" (Jäger March) composed by Jean Sibelius in 1917.

Heikki Nurmio joined the 27th Jäger Battalion in 1916 in Germany. He participated in battles in Germany's Eastern Front and fought against the Russian Empire in the Finnish Civil War. His book Jääkärin päiväkirja (Diary of a jäger) was published in 1918 and he became known for writing war novels for younger audiences.

He was director of the Finnish Cadet School from 1925 to 1927.

During World War II, Nurmio served in the Finnish Army Headquarters as the chief of the War History office. He was promoted to colonel on May 16, 1938.

His brother was Yrjö Nurmio.
