= February Manifesto =

Decree issued by Tsar Nicholas II in 1899

The February Manifesto, also known as His Imperial Majesty's Graceful Announcement (decree collection 3/1899) was a legislative act given by Emperor of Russia Nicholas II on 15 February 1899, defining the legislation order of laws concerning the Grand Duchy of Finland. This included all laws which also concerned the interest of the Russian Empire. The manifesto left the Diet of Finland only an advisory role in passing these laws. The February Manifesto was seen as the beginning of the first period of Russian oppression and generally the start of Russification of Finland.

The fundamental statutes of state legislation procedure were published in connection with the manifesto, based on which the Russian state council would review the law proposals. The emperor had the final decision. There was no definition or restriction of what matters the state legislation concerned.

The February Manifesto was prepared in secret from the Finns, although it was based on the work of two Russian-Finnish committees active in the early 1890s. Its immediate purpose was to enable the discontinuation of the Finnish military conscripted in 1881, which the Diet of Finland did not want to agree to. However, the manifesto acted as a start for the politics driven by Nikolay Bobrikov who had been appointed Governor-General of Finland in 1898, which aimed at narrowing the autonomy of Finland and other ways of Russification of Finland. The Great Petition was assembled to counter the manifesto.

The Finns felt the February Manifesto was a coup d'etat. When Finland had been annexed to Russia in 1809, Emperor Alexander I had promised that the old laws could stay in force. According to the interpretation in Finland at the time, this also included the Swedish Gustavian era constitution, defining the rights of the Diet of Finland. These rights had been respected ever since the Diet of Finland first assembled in 1863. Narrowing the rights of the Diet of Finland by a unilateral edict from the emperor was seen as a breach of constitution. According to the Finns, Nicholas II also broke his imperial oath, where he had promised to protect the laws of Finland. From the Russian point of view, the Finnish constitution could not override the autocracy of the emperor.

Although the February Manifesto narrowed the autonomy of Finland, it has gained a reputation bigger than its actual content throughout history. The only law directly enacted by the manifesto was the 1901 law of military conscription in Finland, which discontinued the military of Finland and forced the Finnish people to undergo military conscription in the military of Russia. The February Manifesto was first temporarily repealed by the November Manifesto in 1905 and then permanently by the March Manifesto in 1917.

== Content of the manifesto and its fundamental statutes ==
According to the fundamental statutes of the February Manifesto, the enactment of a new law in Finland could only be initiated by a Russian minister or a Finnish minister-secretary after negotiation with a Russian minister, or alternatively by the Governor-General of Finland through them. The Diet of Finland would only have an advisory role: the governor-general, the minister-secretary, the Senate of Finland and the Diet of Finland could each give their statement about the law proposal, however the Diet of Finland could only do so in the case of a law requiring normal review. As well as this, when the Russian State Council was discussing laws concerning Finland, the discussion could be attended by the Governor-General of Finland, the minister-secretary, and especially invited Finnish senators. Neither the manifesto or its fundamental statutes ever defined which matters were considered state legislation in Finland. This left open the possibility that any law whatsoever could be declared as such.

== Background ==
=== Finnish constitution and imperial era ===
When Finland was annexed to Russia in 1809, Emperor Alexander I gave an imperial oath to the Finns at the Diet of Porvoo, where he promised to retain the religion, the constitution, the privileges of the estates and their "constitutional" rights. He also mentioned this at his speech at the inauguration of the diet. Alexander I never further explained which specific laws he meant when he spoke of constitutional laws (Finnish: perustuslait, Swedish: grundlagar, French: lois fondamentales, Russian: korennyje zakony) or the constitution (la constitution, konstitutsya). During the following years and decades, it gradually became an established interpretation in Finland that this meant the Swedish Instrument of Government of 1772 and the Union and Security Act of 1789, except for some points in conflict with the new situation. This led to the conclusion that although the emperor was an autocrat in Russia, in Finland he had agreed to a position of a constitutional ruler, who had no right to decide on certain matters without approval from the diet. These interpretations were later disputed in Russia. In practice however these constitutional laws were taken into action in the Finnish administration.

For a long time, the Finns took for granted that the emperors had committed to constitutional rule in Finland, as each emperor had given an imperial oath to Finland upon inauguration, renewing the promises made by Alexander I. None of the emperors had however specifically mentioned Finland's constitution until Alexander II confirmed the new dietary order in 1869, whose introduction mentioned that the emperor would retain the rights according to the 1772 form of government and the Union and Security Act. The exact constitutional laws were not specified in the imperial oaths even after this. Some historians have later questioned whether Alexander I or any of his successors ever really thought himself to be bound by the Finnish constitution or whether they simply saw themselves as having made voluntary allowances, which they could later unilaterally revoke. The Russian way of governmental thinking was different from the Swedish-Finnish one and was based on an autocratic tradition, where the ruler was above the laws.

Before the Diet of Finland was founded in 1863, some laws were enacted by imperial order, which would have required acceptance from the diet under Finnish constitution, such as ending the execution of capital punishment in 1826 and the law giving the Orthodox right to hold public offices in 1827.

=== State legislation before the February Manifesto ===
From 1808 to 1898 about 200 laws and decrees were enacted, with identical content in the Russian and Finnish decree collections. As there was no separate order of state legislation, enactment of congruent laws was directed by the 1826 state secretary directive, according to which enacting Russian laws in Finland would happen through the Minister-Secretary and his decision, as well as the 1891 amendment, according to which the Minister-Secretary should request a statement from the corresponding Russian minister for all Finnish laws concerning the interests of Russia. The role of the Diet of Finland was never mentioned in these decrees at all. However, as the diet started regularly assembling in 1863, it became a de facto standard that the decisions of the diet were not overridden in enacting laws, which fit together with the Finnish idea of constitutional law.

Before 1863 it was easier for Russia to have its way in Finnish legislation, as the Minister-Secretary generally considered the Russian point of view first. The introduction of the Diet of Finland made the situation more complicated. Most of the uniform laws between Finland and Russia before the February Manifesto had already been enacted before 1863. According to the interpretation used by the Finns, state legislation was a kind of contract between states, which was taken into force only if the diet accepted them voluntarily. This interpretation was not accepted in Russia, but until 1899 conflicts could be avoided by negotiating different points of views about the content of individual laws.

=== Russian unification goals ===
In the 19th century Russia sought to unify its realm, especially by Russifying the frontier lands. In Finland, unification was hindered by the local autonomy and constitutional laws, so they would have to be either discontinued or redefined. There had been a common codification, meaning a unification of laws and edicts, under planning already since 1826. The original idea was to extend it to Finland already in 1835, but Alexander Sergeyevich Menshikov, the governor-general at the time, had stopped it. In the 19th century, the Russian government used a lot of resources towards the codification of laws, and a special codification department was founded in the state council. Finns viewed the codification very suspiciously, as they feared it would lead to unification of Finnish legislation with that of Russia. The Finns were especially interested in the codification of constitutional laws, as that would allow the Grand Duchy of Finland to have its own form of government and gain Russia's recognition.

The birth of the February Manifesto was a natural result of the politics the old and patriotic Russian Slavophiles and Pan-Slavists had towards conquered lands, with their most important goal being a strong and unified Russia. The Russian conservatives resisted change and sought to strengthen the autocratic system. The Russian zapadniks, meaning politicians geared towards renovation, opposed the conservative politics seeking to replace the old and autocratic system with a more democratic and liberal state. They viewed Finland as their model, which made the conservatives want to unify Finland closer with the parent country and abolish Finland's autonomy. In the years after the January Uprising in Congress Poland the Slavophiles and Pan-Slavists replaced the reformists and gained access to influential key positions. The Russo-Turkish War (1877–1878) further increased the influence of the Pan-Slavists. However, in his final years Alexander II felt it necessary to keep the enthusiasm of the Pan-Slavists down. Russification of the Baltic countries was made by making the Russian language the standard language of official matters. Next, the Pan-Slavists and Slavophiles sought to abolish Finland's special position, just as the Baltic German historian Carl Schirren had previously predicted.

== Development leading to the manifesto ==
=== The Weissenberg committee ===
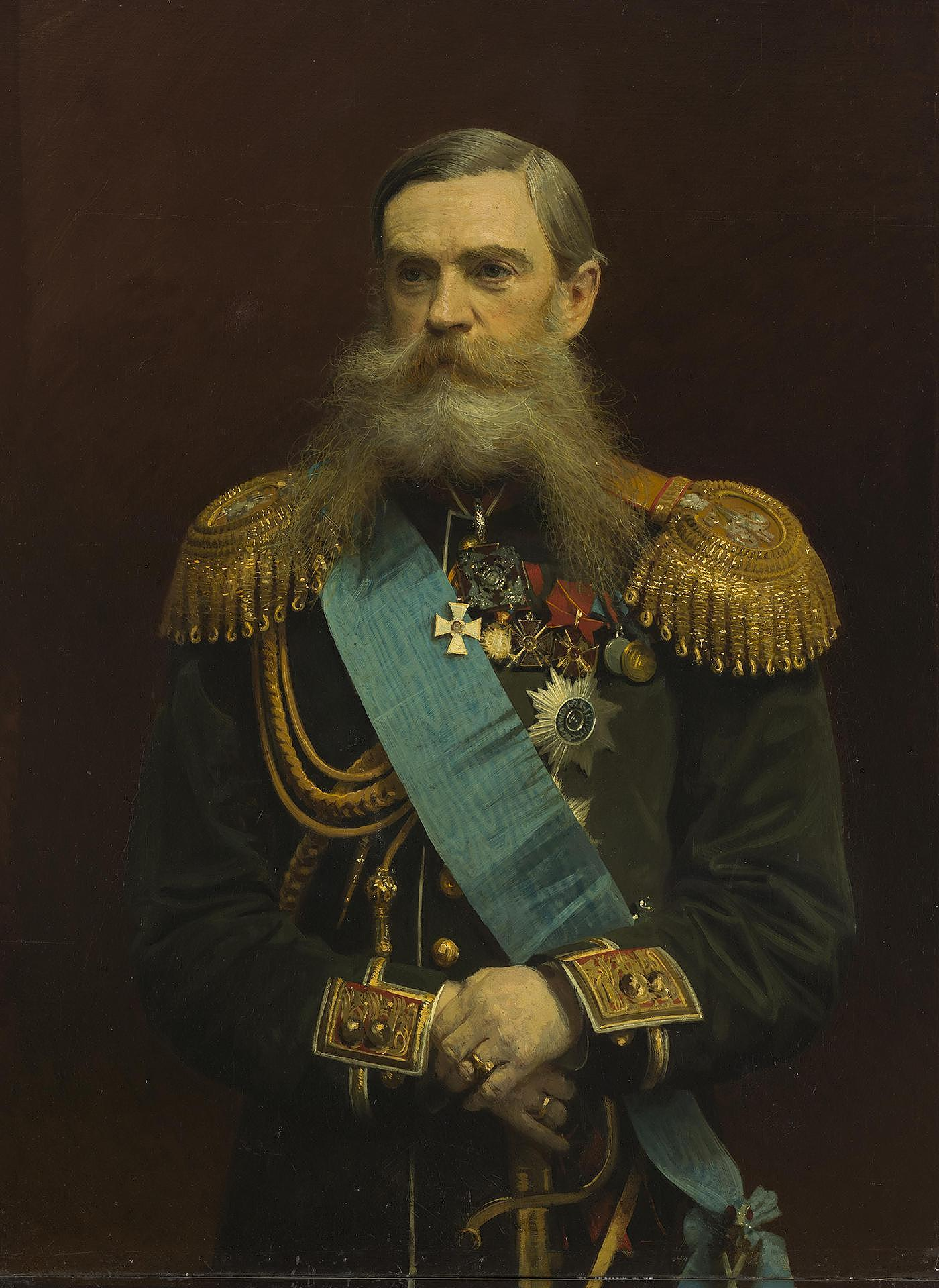
Count Fyodor Logginovich van Heiden, Governor-General of Finland. Portrait by Ivan Kramskoi from 1881.

Direct development leading to the February Manifesto is said to have started with a codification attempt of Finnish laws started by Governor-General of Finland Fyodor Logginovich van Heiden. Heiden found a conflict between the Finnish and Russian laws in 1882, when the Finnish procurator Theodor Sederholm complained that the gendarmerie had illegally arrested the Finnish-Russian teacher Paul Leontjeff in Helsinki for possession of political literature forbidden in Russia. Emperor Alexander III ordered the governor-general to ask for a statement from the procurator in further unclear legal questions, but also ordered Heiden and the Senate of Finland to make a proposal about the codification of Finnish laws on a suggestion from minister-secretary of the state Theodor Bruun. As before, the Finns opposed the codification, and so the senate suggested founding a permanent law drafting body instead. Heiden insisted on the codification of at least those constitutional laws he felt were unclear. In 1884 a compromise was reached, where a permanent legislation board was founded for regular laws per the wishes of the senate, but a separate committee was appointed for the codification of constitutional laws and other governmental and judicial edicts.

A Finnish committee led by Alexander von Weissenberg was appointed in 1885. Other committee members included senator Isak Fellman, professors Thiodolf Rein and Robert Hermanson, and judge Karl Woldemar Nystén. The secretary of the committee was Johan Richard Danielson-Kalmari. The members were appointed on suggestion from the senate and Heiden, but Alexander III made significant changes to the candidate list of the senatorial council. To Heiden's disappointment, Weissenberg and the majority of the committee supported Leo Mechelin's controversial theory that Finland was a separate state in a real union with Russia. Instead of mere codification, the committee wanted to strengthen Finland's judicial position and made a proposal for a new form of government based on Swedish-era constitutional laws. Of the committee members, only Hermanson disagreed with the idea, rejecting the union theory, but he also agreed that Finland was an autonomous state inside Russia.

The committee's report, including proposals for a new form of government and privileges, was given to the senate in December 1886. The senate was worried about the opinion the Russians might possibly have of the report and did not hurry in investigating the matter. The report, written in Swedish, was interpreted to Heiden by Konstantin Ivanovich Yakubov, a teacher of the Alexander Gymnasium in Helsinki, who wrote a critical note about it.

For three years, nothing was done about the committee's report, but at New Year's time from 1889 to 1890 Heiden sought an imperial order that statements about it were to be requested from the Russian foreign minister and the codification department of the state council, after which it would be investigated in a new commission led by Heiden. The statement by the codification department criticised judicial views concerning the constitutional laws of the Finns, and also the national-minded minister of justice Nikolay Manassein gave a very negative statement. He had crushed the autonomy of the Baltic countries in the early 1880s. The statement by the codification department arrived in August 1890 and that by the minister of justice in October in the same year. The Senate of Finland had delayed investigating the matter by only appointing a board to investigate the matter in March 1890. The board was appointed in secret, because it was not part of Heiden's plan. Mechelin, having left the senate in the same year because of the Postal Manifesto, participated in the board even after leaving the senate.

=== The Heiden commission ===
A commission led by Governor-General Heiden met in Helsinki from October to November 1890, attempting to review the report given by the Weissenberg committee after they had returned from St. Petersburg. The commission was originally supposed to consist of Heiden and eight Finnish senators, but Heiden also invited one expert from the Russian foreign ministry and two from the codification department of the state council, making the commission a mixed Finnish-Russian committee in practice. The Finnish members were deputy chairmen of the judicial and economic departments of the senate, Johan Philip Palmén and Samuel Werner von Troil, as well as the senators Theodor Cederholm, August Nybergh, Emil Streng, Victor Napoleon Procopé, Karl Ferdinand Ignatius and Johan Gustaf Sohlman. The Russian members included Kronid Malychev and Pyotr Haritonov from the codification department as well as Alexander Hvostov from the ministry of law. The secretary and interpreter of the committee was lector Konstantin Ivanovich Yakubov.

Heiden's original goal might have been to persuade the Finnish members of the commission to accept some kind of a compromise, but the Finnish and Russian members disagreed so badly that no common ground could be found. The Russians repeated the opinion of historian Kesar Ordin and rejected the idea of the Grand Duchy of Finland being its own state, while the Finns kept to their own interpretation of the constitutional law and defended the report given by the Weissenberg committee. Both parties sought to fulfil their own political goals. The Finns made a proposal of a collection of constitutional laws, which was a bit milder than the report given by the Weissenberg committee at controversial points, but it was still not enough for the Russians. After concluding that a compromise was impossible Heiden made a proposal of his own. The proposal did not recognise Finland as a state and only left some "local rights" to it. State legislation overrode Finland's own laws. Heiden's proposal was titled "A fundamental legislation of the government of the provinces in the Grand Duchy of Finland", as the Russians refused to use the term "form of government", which would have referred to the idea of Finland being a state of its own.

=== The Bunge mixed committee ===
The documents and conflicting statements of the Heiden commission were sent to a senate board appointed to review the report given by the Weissenberg committee. The senate finished its statement about the matter in May 1891. It was presented to Emperor Alexander III in spring 1892 in connection with the previously mentioned Heiden counterproposal, but events had already taken a new turn before this. Heiden had prepared a note as the introduction of his counterproposal, which he had separately presented to the emperor in December 1891. At this time, the emperor decided to appoint a mixed Russian-Finnish committee led by the former finance minister of Russia Nikolai von Bunge to create rules about the relationship between the general and local legislation. This committee might have been the idea of either Heiden or the codification department of the state council.

The Bunge committee worked in St. Petersburg from 1892 to 1893. Its Russian members included Bunge, governor-general Heiden, financial minister Manaissen, minister of war Pyotr Vannovsky, interior minister Ivan Durnovo and leader of the codification department of the state council Eduard Frisch. The Finnish members included senator Georg von Alfthan, minister-secretary of the state Woldermar von Daehn, assistant minister-secretary of the state Victor Napoleon Procopé and procurator Georg Henrik Calonius.

Per Bunge's wishes, the committee concentrated on the question of the position of general legislature, which had been raised in Heiden's note and in the codification department's 1890 statement before that. The Bunge committee was also given the material produced by the Weissenberg and Heiden committees and statements given about them, but only the Heiden note was actually used in the Bunge committee's work. The Russian and Finnish members of the committee made proposals for reports, which differed drastically from each other. The Russian proposal would have created a new legislation order for the Finnish laws concerning the interests of the Russian empire, in which the Diet of Finland would only have had an advisory role. The Finns opposed the restriction of the legislative rights of the estates, whereas the Russians thought the Finnish estates could not have a veto right in matters concerning the interests of the empire. When the committee failed to reach a unanimous decision, its Russian majority decided in March 1893 to present their proposal to the emperor in the name of the entire committee. However, per the Finns' protest, Alexander III delayed the investigation of the matter and never took action on it before his death. In May 1893 Alexander III did give an order to appoint a new Russian-Finnish legislation codification committee, but this apparently never took place. Only in 1899 was a new systematisation committee of the Finnish legislature appointed in connection with the state council.

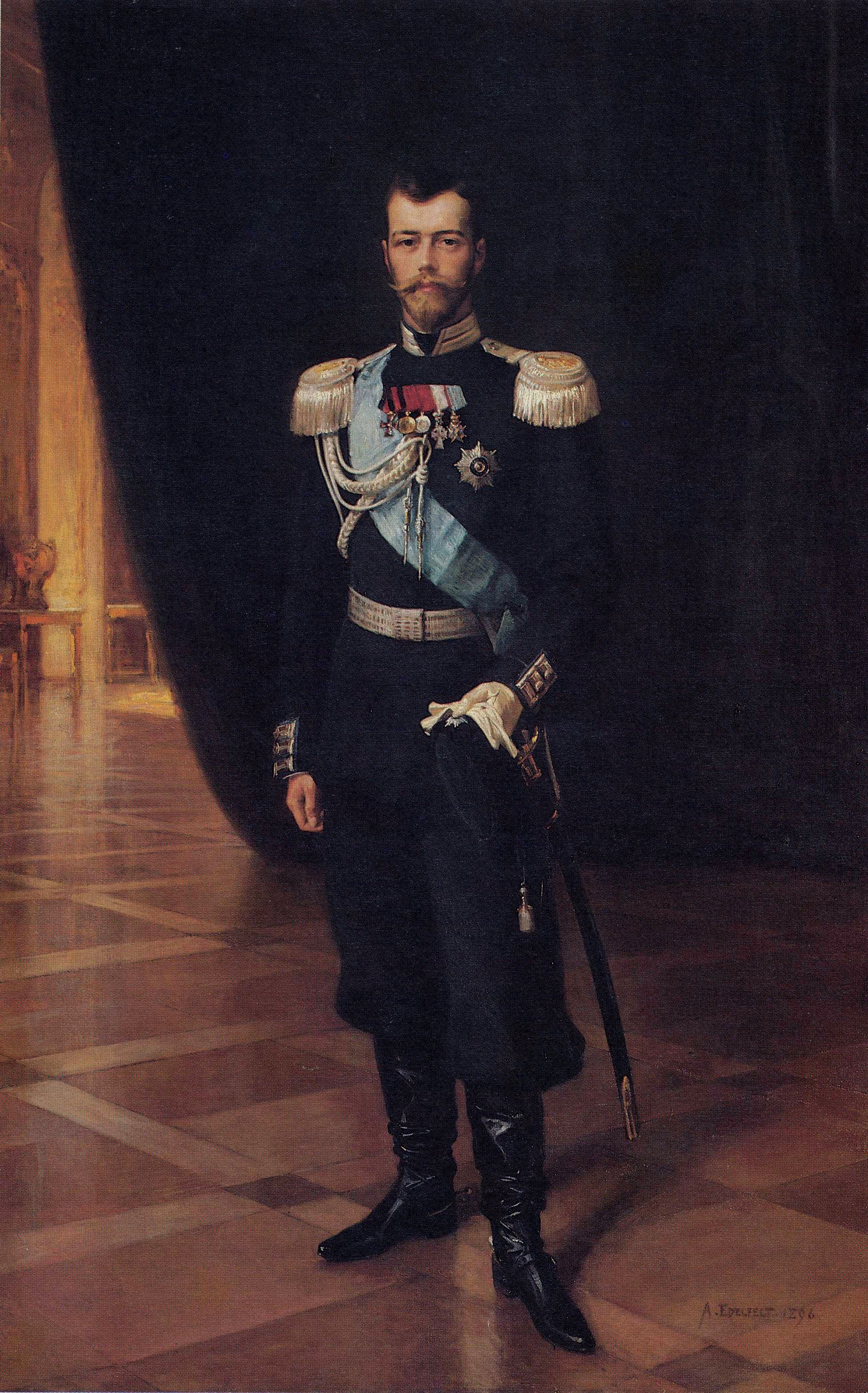
Emperor Nicholas II of Russia. A portrait by Albert Edelfelt from 1896.

Secretary of the state council Vyacheslav von Plehve asked the new Emperor Nicholas II in January 1895 what to do about the question investigated by the Bunge committee. According to von Plehve, taking the Russian proposal of the committee into action would cause unrest in Finland, and so the emperor decided not to pursue the matter. The decision might have been influenced by the emperor's mother Maria Feodorovna, who viewed the Finns in favour and who still had a great influence over her son at the time. During the following years, the Finnish estates were repeatedly pressured to accept laws proposed by the Russian ministers on the grounds that the Russians might otherwise take the proposal given by the Russian majority of the Bunge committee into action.

=== The conscription question ===
General conscription was adapted in Russia in 1870, and Russia wanted to extend this to Finland as well. In February 1871 minister of war Dmitry Milyutin took a stand in the conscription question in Finland. Count Nikolay Adlerberg, the Governor-General of Finland at the time, opposed Milyutin's idea of suppressing Finland's autonomy. Conscription was adapted in Finland so that a separate army taken from the Russian armed forces was founded in Finland, called the Finnish armed forces, which could only be used to defend Finland's own territory. Alexander II approved the law of Finnish conscription on 27 August 1878. Milyutin was opposed to this "separatist" solution, but accepted it as a temporary solution, as the law was first enacted for a trial period of ten years. The Russians F. P. Yelenev and Mikhail Borodkin, who had been critical of Finland's autonomy, later claimed that the officials of the Finnish state secretariat had fooled Milyutin and Alexander II into accepting the Finnish conscription law by keeping the constitutional nature of some of its points secret from them.

When the ten-year trial period of the Finnish armed forces founded in 1881 had passed, minister of war Vannovsky made a proposal to the emperor in 1891 to integrate it into the Russian armed forces. According to him, the current situation was contrary to the interests of the Russian defence forces and the Finnish forces were not to be trusted, so the military burden could not be divided more equally between Finland and Russia. Alexander III stated he would accept this proposal in principle. In 1893, a committee led by Vannovsky proposed that integrating the Finnish armed forces as part of the Russian armed forces would be handled by enacting a new conscription law in Finland. Heiden was opposed to this idea, as it would have weakened the position of the Governor-General of Finland as the chief of the Finnish defence district. He also stated that discontinuing the Finnish armed forces would lessen, not strengthen, the Finnish commitment to the defense of the empire. Now also Alexander III changed his mind, as he did not want to offend the Finns any more. The proposal never progressed any further in his lifetime.

After Nicholas II succeeded Alexander III as emperor and the elderly Heiden had resigned from his post, two new committees were founded from 1896 to 1897 to investigate the matter according to Vannovsky's previous proposal, both of which were led by general Viktor Dandeville. Mikhail Borodkin was also part of both committees. The committee members also included Finnish soldiers, such as Waldemar Schauman, Michael Leonard von Blom, Kasten Antell and Guido Gadolin, but their opinions were not noted. Despite the resistance from the Finnish committee members, the committee gave a new report in spring 1897, which stated that the Finnish armed forces were to be discontinued and the Russian conscription law was to be enacted also in Finland.

== The birth of the manifesto ==
=== Proposal for a conscription law, Kuropatkin and Bobrikov ===
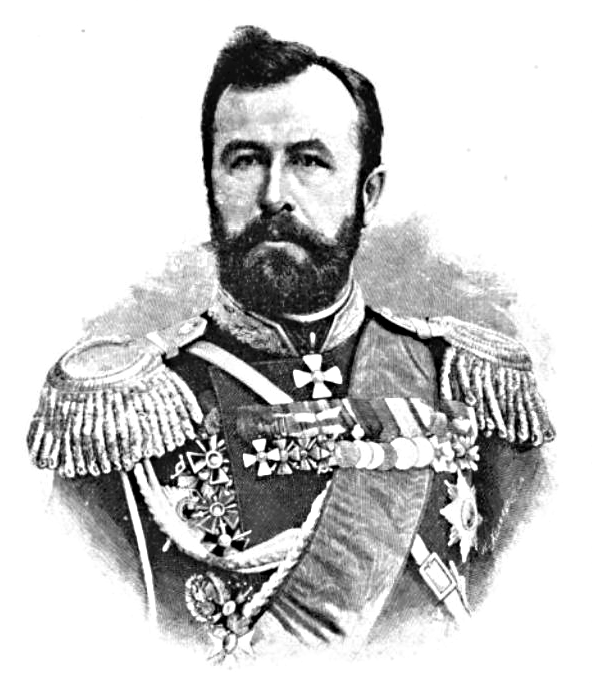
Russian minister of war Kuropatkin in 1898.

Two development lines led to the February Manifesto: the goal to change the 1878 conscription law and the need of state legislation necessary for the change to take effect.

A new proposal for the Finnish conscription law based on the work of Dandeville's committee was made at the Russian General Staff in May 1898. It was based on the discontinuation of the Finnish defence forces and expanding the Russian conscription to Finland according to the integration claims made by Milyutin and Vannovsky. The new minister of war Aleksey Kuropatkin, who thought that integration of the defence forces was absolutely necessary, was a staunch supporter of this proposal. He saw it as a start of a greater integration of Finland into the Russian Empire, as serving in the Russian defence forces made the Finnish youth into Russian-speaking "decent Russians". As it was likely that the Diet of Finland would not approve the new conscription law, Kuropatkin wanted to take the question away from their judgement. He first sought an ukase from the emperor to assemble the diet. Minister-secretary of the state von Daehn had surprisingly been recently granted the resignation he had requested in the previous year, and he had been succeeded by his inexperienced assistant Procopé as acting minister-secretary, whom Kuropatkin managed to bypass in preparing the matter. Procopé managed to change the decision so that instead of a normal meeting of the diet, a special meeting of the diet was called in January 1899. Nicholas II signed an ukase about this special meeting on 19 July 1898.

In August 1898 the emperor decided to appoint Nikolay Bobrikov as the new Governor-General of Finland, who supported Kuropatkin's line in the question of Finnish conscription. Bobrikov, who had been influenced by the Russian conservative nationalist press wanted to integrate Finland deeper into the rest of the empire, and had already prepared a ten-point program while preparing for his appointment, of which the third point included the codification of Finnish laws and enforcing an exceptional order of decree for the uniform laws between Finland and the rest of the empire. Other points in Bobrikov's program included the discontinuation of several institutions symbolising Finland's autonomy such as the minister-secretariat of the state, the Finnish customs office and Finland's own monetary system, the adaptation of the Russian language in government offices and secondary schools, and opening Finnish public offices to Russians without restriction.

As the question of Finnish conscription concerned the interests of the entire empire, Kuropatkin thought the Diet of Finland only had the right to make an advisory statement of the proposal, and even that could only concern details about the practical enactment of the law and not "actual parts" of the proposal. Nicholas II appointed a new committee to investigate the matter, led by chief procurator of the Holy Synod Konstantin Pobedonostsev and other members including Kuropatkin, Bobrikov, Heiden, Procopé, Frisch, judicial minister Nikolay Muravyov and Stepan Goncharov, the acting governor-general at the time. The committee made a statement on 14 August that the Diet of Finland could address the proposal in its entirety, but only to give a statement. Kuropatkin was alone opposed to this decision.

=== Preparation of the February Manifesto in a secret committee ===
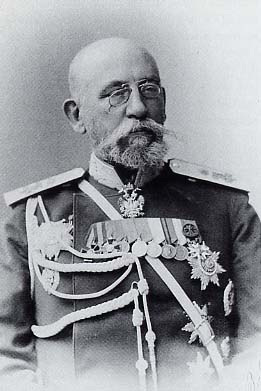
Nikolay Bobrikov, Governor-General of Finland.

The Senate of Finland made a new version of the conscription law proposal for the coming diet in November 1898, which was completely different from that made by the Russian General Staff, because its background was retaining Finland's own armed forces. Kuropatkin and Bobrikov became furious when they heard of the senate's proposal, as they felt the senate had no right to change the content of the proposal. When Nicholas II later confirmed the final law proposal given to the diet, he chose the Russian General Staff's version, although acting minister-secretary of the state Procopé had recommended the senate's version. When Procopé applied to the Finnish constitution, the emperor commented: "We should forget about the form of government already."

Even before this, the activity of the senate had led to another series of events: on 12 December Kuropatkin and Bobrikov decided that a new ukase should be published concerning the review of the conscription law, which would define the enactment of state legislation concerning Finland. The report given by the Russian majority of the Bunge committee could be used as a background, with Bobrikov having studied it when he was appointed to his new post.

Nicholas II agreed and appointed a secret committee to design an imperial notice about the enactment order of laws. This committee was led by the head of the state council, Grand Duke Michael Nikolaevich. Other members included Bobrikov, supreme procurator Pobedonostsev, secretary of the state council von Plehve, judicial minister Muravyov, department directors of the state council Eduard Frisch, Mikhail Nikolayevich Ostrovsky and Dmitry Solsky and acting minister-secretary of the state Procopé as the only Finnish member. The matter could also have been prepared at the state council itself, but the state secretary von Plehve proposed a secret committee selected from the committee members, possibly to strengthen his own influence in the preparation. He was active in the committee.

The committee finished its work quickly, as all the preparation had already been done six years before by the Bunge committee. The committee met three times: 30 January, 10 February and 13 February 1899. Bobrikov only participated in the last meeting. There were no significant differences in opinion between the Russian members of the committee. Only Procopé opposed the point of view of the rest of the committee, but his opinion was ignored. As the preparation was done in secret, Procopé could not warn his countrymen in advance, but he covertly informed Leo Mechelin about the coming manifesto. Fredrik Björnberg, the commissary of the St. Petersburg office of the Bank of Finland was also informed of the matter in advance as he had connections to the widowed Empress Maria Feodorovna.

Nicholas II signed two documents on 15 February (Old Style: 3 February): fundamental rules for state legislation made by the secret committee led by Grand Duke Mikhail, and the Graceful Announcement concerning them, which was the actual February Manifesto. The emperor thought the signing of the manifesto was so trivial that he did not even mention it in his diary. The Finns' angry reaction to the manifesto came as a complete surprise to him. On the other hand, Kuropatkin and Bobrikov might have realised that the manifesto would lead to a conflict with the Finns, and they deliberately sought this.

== The Russian and Finnish interpretations of the manifesto ==
According to the Russians, the manifesto did not significantly alter the relationship between Finland and Russia, as there had already been state legislation before. According to Nicholas II, the manifesto did not even affect the position of the Finnish estates, as he thought they never had a veto right in matters of the state in the first place. Finland had been governed since 1863 so that the estates had never been bypassed in legislature the constitution guaranteed concerned them, but Nicholas II – as possibly Alexander II and Alexander III before him – felt this was a mere voluntary allowance by the sovereign ruler, which he could disobey at will if it served the interests of the empire. There was also a point of view that the manifesto could help Finland's position, as it gave the right to participate in the review of legislature concerning Finland to the Finnish minister-secretary of the state and the members of the senate. In any case, the manifesto at least acknowledged the existence of Finland's own legislation.

The Finns thought the February Manifesto was a coup d'etat. It weakened the foundation of Finland's autonomy by moving decisive power away from Finland to Russia, altered the state legislature rules and took away the rights given to the Diet of Finland by the Finnish constitution although the manifesto itself had not been decreed according to the constitution, and furthermore it had been prepared in secret without consulting any Finnish experts. It was seen to revoke the promises Alexander I had given at the Diet of Porvoo about keeping the Finnish laws and rights in force. Furthermore, the manifesto did not define what exactly constituted state legislation, which meant any law or edict whatsoever could be considered as included in it and thus be altered or revoked by government decree.

The manifesto broke two judicial rules generally accepted in Finland: first that Finland should be under constitutional rule instead of Russian autocracy, and second that the Grand Duchy of Finland should be a state to its own. The possibility to change Finnish laws against the constitution without acceptance from the estates undermined the constitutional government, and if any matter concerning Finland could be moved away from the decision of the Finnish legislative bodies without prior confirmation, Finland would no longer constitute a state.

In his letter to Kuropatkin, Bobrikov saw that the Finns were partly correct, because with the manifesto Finland could "slowly and covertly be changed into a governorate". Bobrikov attempted to reach the Russian autocracy to Finland, but the order of state legislation was only one point in his program. One Russian newspaper wrote about the possible application of the manifesto: "Other than the military, the post, the telegram and the customs, the questions about inheritance, care, justice, court decisions, harbours, consuls, life insurance, trademarks, the power of the governor-general, the position of the Greek clergy, the Russian schools etc. should be counted among these questions."

== The Finns' reactions to the manifesto ==
=== The first reactions and the publication of the manifesto ===
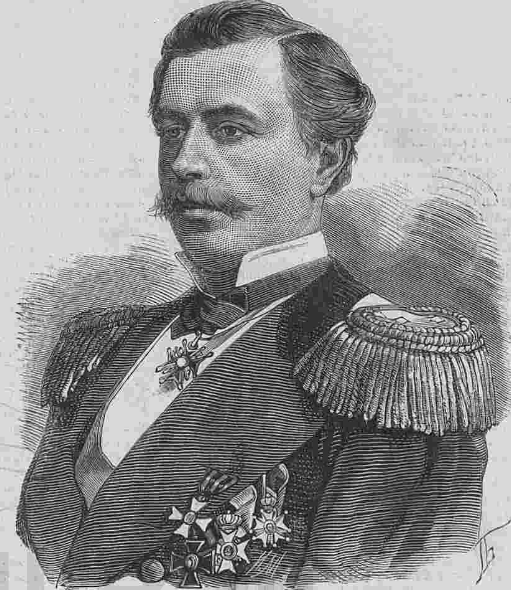
Deputy chairman of the financial department of the Senate of Finland Sten Carl Tudeer, whose vote resolved the decision to publish the manifesto.

Governor-General of Finland Bobrikov returned from St. Petersburg to Helsinki already on the signature day of the manifesto, 15 February 1899 and informed the deputy chairman of the financial department of the Senate of Finland Sten Carl Tudeer and procurator Woldemar Söderhjelm of the manifesto. Knowledge of the manifesto soon to be published reached the people of Helsinki on Thursday 16 February. The Finns took it as a devastating surprise, especially as there had already been rumours of something especially evil coming. In Russia the manifesto was published in the Government Gazette on 17 February.

The senate had to publish all laws and imperial edicts concerning Finland before they were taken into force. However, some Finns thought that the senate had the right to refuse to publish illegal decisions made by the emperor. All of the senators thought the content of the February Manifesto was illegal and wanted to appeal to the emperor to change it, but they also feared that the senate could be disbanded and Russified, if it defied the emperor by refusing to publish the manifesto. The senate negotiated the matter in three unofficial sessions on 16, 17 and 18 February. Many senators were uncertain at first and changed their points of view between the sessions. The differences concerned delaying the publication of the manifesto: either the publication should be delayed, so the senate could appeal to the emperor before it, or the manifesto should be published first and the senate should apply to the emperor after that.

For three days, there was heated discussion about the senate's decision at unofficial club meetings of members of the diet and other intellectuals in Helsinki. The general opinion was strongly against the publication of the manifesto and many officials tried to pressure the senators against publishing it. Mechelin first supported the immediate publication of the manifesto, but changed his opinion after discussing with other officials. A great popular meeting was held on short notice at the Ateneum in Helsinki on the evening of Friday 17 February on the initiative of Arvid Neovius and the Nya Pressen newspaper, consisting of about 300 men from academia, both Finnish-speaking and Swedish-speaking. The meeting was conducted by professor Magnus Gottfrid Schybergson. The meeting unanimously agreed to oppose the manifesto, and made an appeal to the senate signed by 225 people, and sent delegations to the procurator and to the senators.

The senate finally agreed to publish the manifesto on its second session on Saturday 18 February. The votes in favour and against the publication were even, so Tudeer's vote resolved the question. As well as Tudeer, the publication was supported by senators Yrjö Sakari Yrjö-Koskinen, Ossian Wuorenheimo, August af Nyborg, Isak Fellman, Johan Sohlman, Henrik Borenius, Gustaf Oskar Gylling and Gustaf Langenskiöld. The immediate publication was opposed by deputy chairman of the judicial department Theodor Cederholm and the senators Karl Ferdinand Ignatius, Waldemar Schauman, Lennart Gripenberg, August Nybergh, Nikolai Konstantin Hornborg, Gustaf Robert Alfred Charpentier, Ludvig Gustaf Leonhard Clouberg, Sven Wilhelm Hougberg and Gösta von Troil. Of the senators representing the Finnish Party, all but one supported the publication, while of those representing the Swedish Party, all but two opposed it. Apparently because of outside pressure, procurator Söderhjelm objected to the senate's decision, even though he had himself supported the publication on the day before.

Together with the publication of the manifesto, the senate approved a letter addressed to the emperor, appealing to his imperial oath, explaining the unconstitutional nature of the manifesto and requesting it to be replaced with an edict given in constitutional order. Procopé read the letter to Nicholas II on 24 February, but it had no effect. Tudeer and Söderhjelm representing the senate as well as the speakers of all four estates of the diet had arrived in St. Petersburg to appeal to the emperor, but Nicholas II refused to meet them. The emperor's negative response was officially announced to the senate on 2 March.

Per Bobrikov's demand, the manifesto also had to be printed and sent to all officials in Finland and read aloud in a church to the people like laws and edicts were. This was carried out, but with some delay.

=== Protests after the publication ===
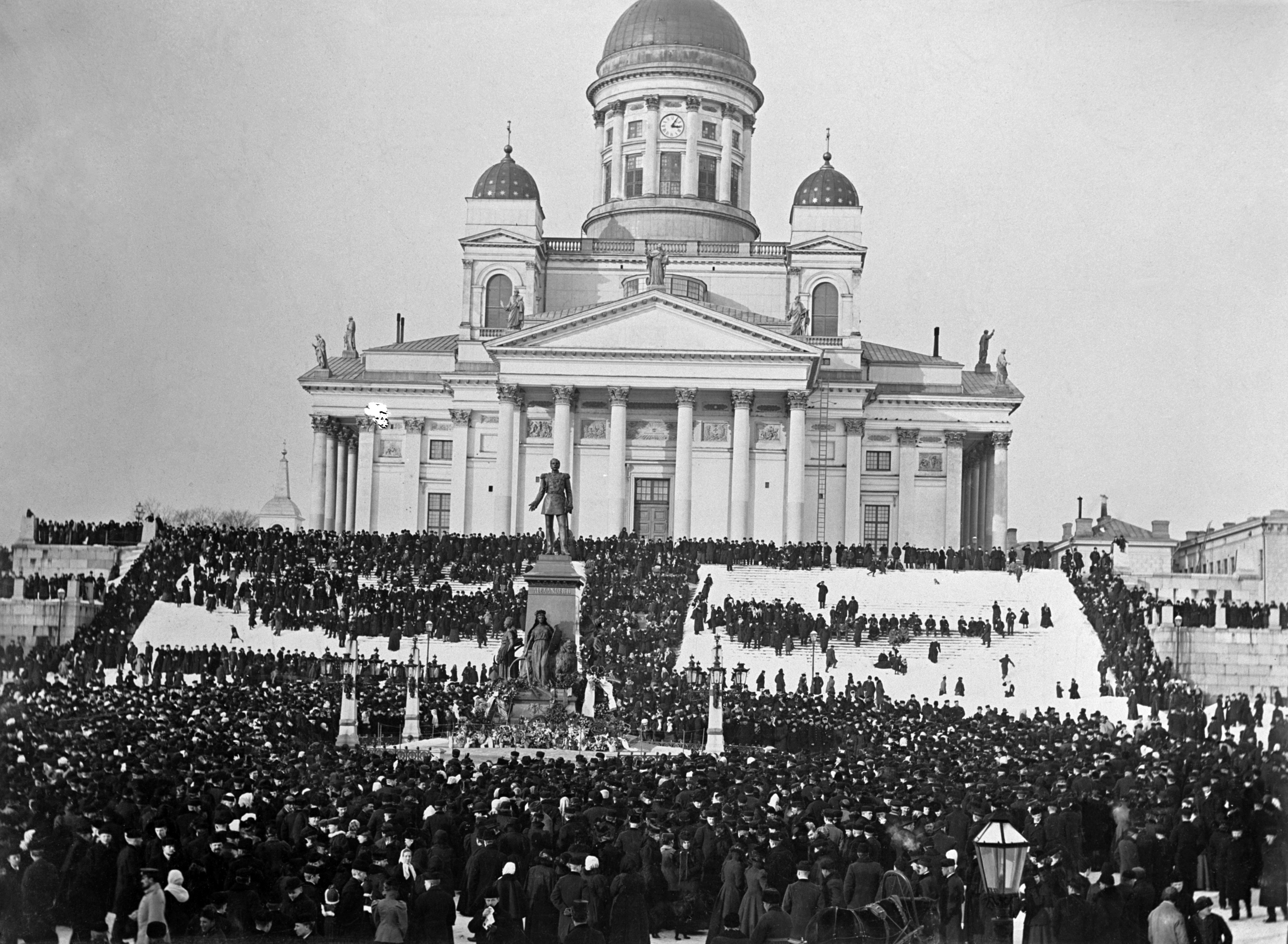
A demonstration at the Senate Square in Helsinki on 13 March 1899.

Early in the morning on Saturday 18 February thousands of people were at the Senate Square in Helsinki awaiting information about the publication of the manifesto. Information about the publication was met throughout Finland with feelings of sorrow, hopelessness and bitterness. In Helsinki, there were mourning clothes, drapes and cloths displayed at the windows of fashion shops and books defending Finland's rights at the windows of book shops. A particularly noteworthy sight was that almost all women on the streets were in mourning clothes. University students had mourning drapes on their hands. The entire city was like undergoing a funeral. Publication of the manifesto was delayed by a strike by the typesetters of the Virallinen lehti newspaper, but it was printed on the issue on 18 February.

One of the most prominent demonstrations against the manifesto was bringing flower wreaths to the memorial statue of Alexander II on the Helsinki Senate Square, as Alexander II was remembered as a protector of the Finnish constitution. The first flowers were brought to the statue on 19 February, after which this activity continued spontaneously and culminated in large flower arrangements on 3 March, 13 March and May Day. The Russian authorities could not forbid this form of protest as Alexander II had been Nicholas II's grandfather. The memory of Alexander II was celebrated throughout in Finland particularly on the day of his death on 13 March, when the statue in Helsinki was decorated with the largest display of flowers and wreaths of all time; there were wreaths brought in all the way from far away in the countryside. Finland's national anthem Maamme was sung in front of the statue and nine shouts of eläköön ("long live") were given in honour of Alexander II.

Knowledge of the senate's decision spread immediately to the public and lists of the names of the senators who had supported the publication of the manifesto were spread throughout Helsinki. They were met with general disrespect and were even targeted by acts of vandalism. The word petturi ("traitor") was written on the wall of one senator. Yrjö Sakari Yrjö-Koskinen, the leader of the Finnish Party, was met with particular contempt, as he was seen as the "main culprit" of the vote, as people thought he had persuaded his fellow party members to agree with him. A coffin was brought to the lobby of Yrjö-Koskinen's home as a threat. In the end, Yrjö-Koskinen resigned from the senate in early March after first giving an objection to the objection of procurator Söderhjelm during the publication of the manifesto. Those senators who had opposed the publication of the manifesto were seen as heroes.

At first, the Finns thought Nicholas II had only signed the manifesto deluded by his clever advisors. But when the emperor refused to meet the delegations of the senate and the estates, the Finns accused him of breaking his imperial oath. The Finns were so upset about this that they even blamed him for natural phenomena: particularly bad floods of spring 1899 were called "the Oathbreaker's flood" and the Bjurböle meteorite which had fallen near Porvoo on 12 March was seen as nature's own objection to the activity of the emperor.

=== The Great Petition ===
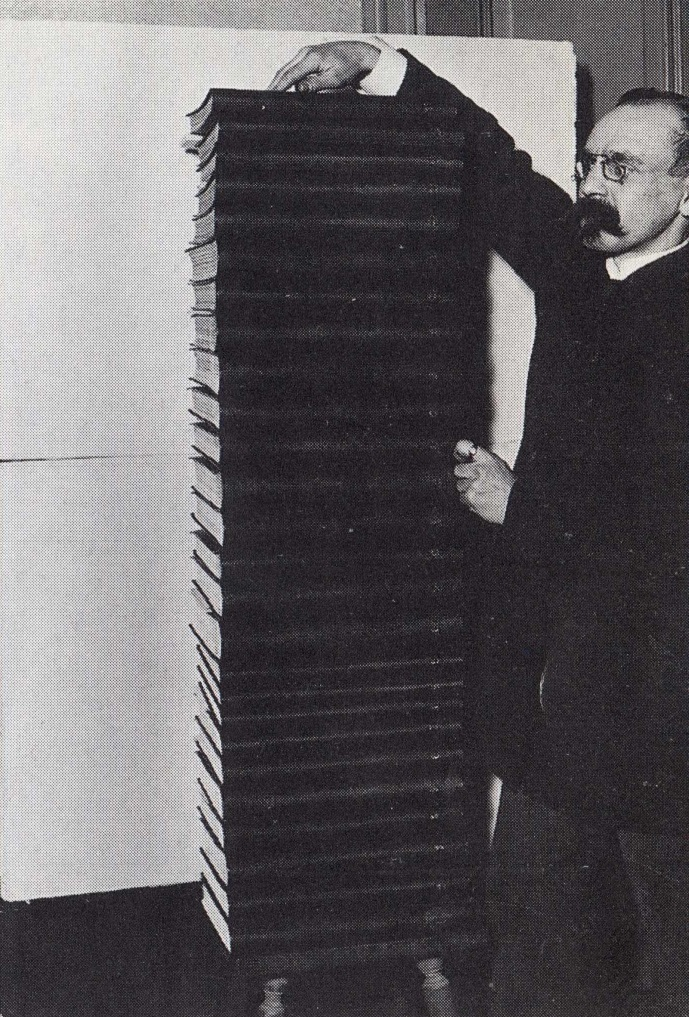
The Great Petition bound in 26 volumes.

The Finns thought Nicholas II could still change his mind if appealed to in the name of the entire people. The idea of a great petition was born among the Swedish-speaking intellectuals in Helsinki in a couple of days after the publication of the manifesto. Assembling the petition was agreed in a closed citizens' meeting held at the Ateneum on 20 February. The petition was organised by several parties and language groups, but was tightly kept secret from the Russian authorities. Any man or woman over 16 years of age could sign the petition. Over 520 thousand signatures were assembled to the petition in about a week in early March, which accounted for at least a third of the entire adult population of Finland. Signatures were assembled almost throughout the entire country, save for some remote lands which were too difficult to access.

To deliver the petition to emperor, representatives from each municipality in Finland were selected to a great delegation numbering almost 500 people. The delegation set off to St. Petersburg on the evening of 15 March. The delegation did not ask permission from the governor-general, even though it would have been required to do so by law. Nicholas II refused to meet the delegation or receive the petition. Minister-secretary of the state Procopé read the response had got from the emperor to representatives on the delegation on 18 March, according to which the Finns should return home and the petition should be delivered via a normal route through provincial governors and the governor-general. Nicholas II also announced he was not angry. Nicholas II's refusal to receive the Great Petition or meet the delegation strengthened his image in Finland as an "oath-breaking emperor" who had knowingly broken the Finnish constitution. The Great Petition was sent to the emperor once again through provincial governors and the governor-general as he had instructed, but when it arrived in June 1899 Nicholas II once again refused to receive it and sent it back.

A small number of Finns thought the February Manifesto was a good thing and refused to sign the Great Petition. These were mostly steadless tenants, who believed the baseless rumours spread by so-called laukkuryssäs (Finnish for "bag Russians"), meaning travelling salesmen from White Karelia, about a land reform caused by the "Russian law". There has been frequent suspicion that some Russian body would have organised spreading rumours serving Russification through these "bag Russians", but this could not be proven. Some steadless tenants and working-class people also thought defending the Finnish constitution was useless as it did not improve their own position.

== Reactions abroad ==
Foreign law scholars had studied Finland's judicial position, which rose to a debate subject at university lecterns and international negotiations. Presentations about Finland's position were held for large audiences. Many German newspapers published articles soon after the publication of the February Manifesto. The same happened in the United Kingdom, where The Times and many other newspapers defended Finland's point of view about the subject. Many newspapers in France also did the same. Many correspondents were sent to Finland to report on the situation. Finns staying abroad formed a secret ombudsman network which actively influenced the press in western Europe to write about the February Manifesto mostly in a manner supporting the Finnish interpretation and publish writings from Finns about the subject. A special fund for influencing the foreign press had already been collected in Finland through donations, and in January 1899 a three-person committee consisting of Leo Mechelin, Emil Nestor Setälä and Arvid Neovius was set up to guide its use. The Finns also sought to found Finland-related newspapers in many countries in the local languages.

In 1899 the Pro Finlandia petition signed by 1063 internationally known cultural, scientific and political figures all over Europe was also assembled. Its text was written in nine languages, and Finnish cultural people and scholars went around Europe to gather signatures. A six-person delegation led by the French judicial scholar Ludovic Trarieux travelled to St. Petersburg in June 1899 to deliver the petition personally to Nicholas II, but Nicholas II refused to meet even this delegation.

== Consequences ==
=== Conscription law ===
The 1899 diet did not accept the proposal for a conscription law and drafted their own counterproposal intended as a compromise, but this was ignored in St. Petersburg. The conscription law progressed to final review by the state council in May 1901, where the majority of the council made several changes to the proposal recommended by financial minister Sergei Witte according to the Finns' wishes. However, the decision by the state council was only advisory, and the emperor later resolved the matter according to the wishes of Kuropatkin and Bobrikov. In June 1901, Nicholas II enacted a new conscription law in Finland as an imperial manifesto, which disbanded the Finnish armed forces except for the Finnish Guards' Rifle Battalion and the Finnish Dragoon Regiment which were subjected to the Russian ministry of war, and the Finnish mounted regiment. The 1901 conscription law proved to be the only time when the February Manifesto was actually put into use. Some other edicts were still enacted during the first period of Russian oppression seen as illegal in Finland, for example the Language Manifesto in 1900.

=== Passive resistance and artworks ===
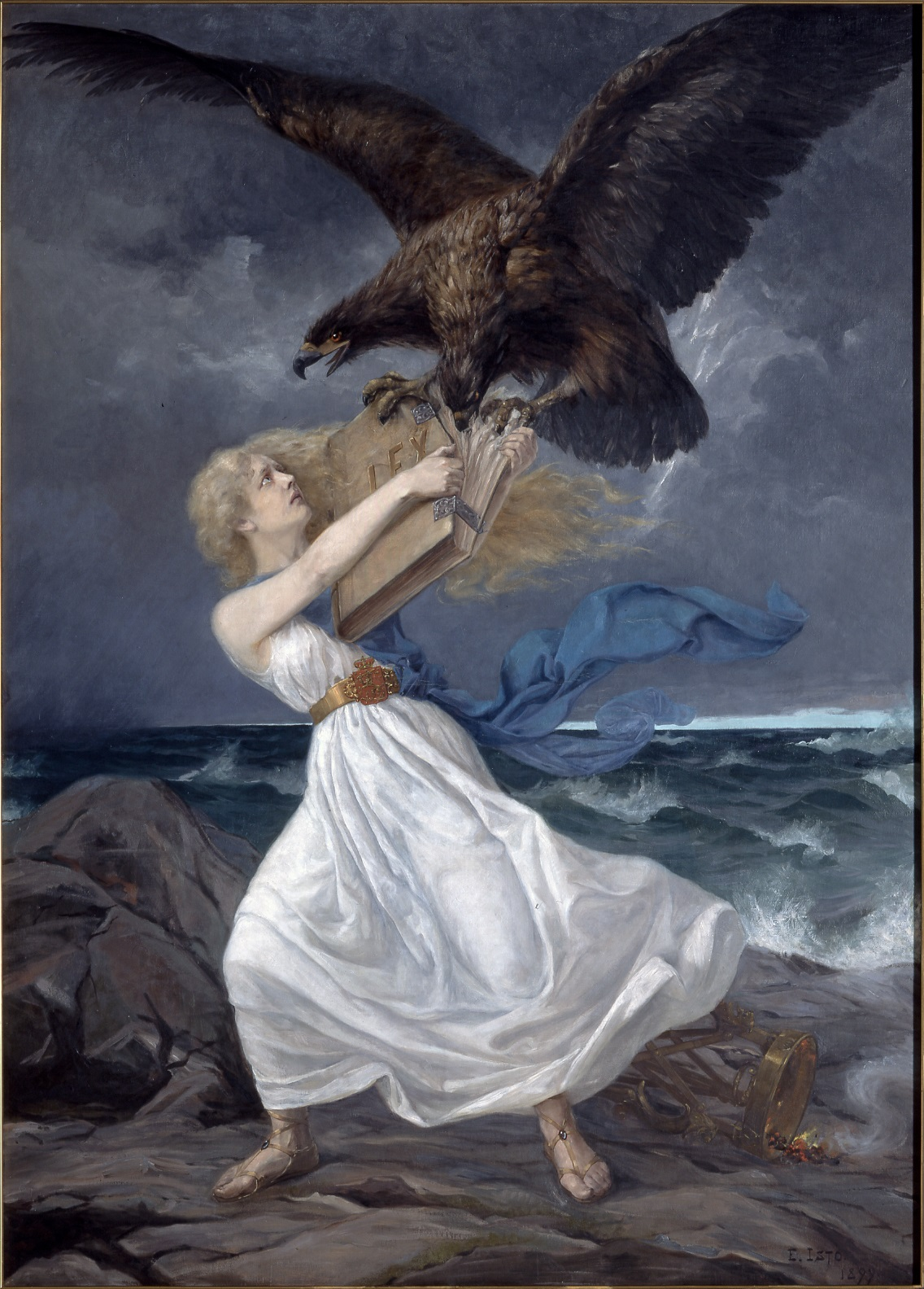
The 1899 painting The Attack by Edvard Isto depicts the double-headed eagle of Russia attacking the Finnish Maiden and attempting to rob her book of law.

The February Manifesto ended the Finnish people's loyalty to the Emperor of Russia, which had continued since 1809. The so-called "Constitutionals", consisting of the Young Finnish Party and most of the Swedish Party, started passive resistance: they refused to obey orders they thought were illegal and proposed that the people do the same. Most of the labour movement also supported passive resistance. Constitutional senators and high-ranking officials either resigned as a protest towards illegal edicts, or were fired from their posts after they refused to put them into action. They were replaced by Finnish Party members supporting an appeasement line, which caused the senate and the whole official body to become completely Finnish.

The resistance the February Manifesto caused in Finland and the Great Petition made the Finnish people aware of the Finnish constitution and state law. In the bilingual country of Finland, the language could not act as a factor uniting the people, but the constitution could. This nationalist idea was prominent in the contemporary art, such as the famous painting The Attack by Edvard Isto, prints of which were circulated all over Finland. The thoughts of the Finns were also spread by propaganda abroad, such as at the 1900 Exposition Universelle in Paris. Leo Mechelin in particular was active in spreading this kind of international propaganda.

As well as The Attack, another artwork that also was widespread was a picture of Nicholas II signing the document under pressure from Pobedonostsev, von Plehve, Kuropatkin and Bobrikov. This picture depicted the Finnish image of an emperor influenced by malevolent advisors.

=== Plans for amending the February Manifesto ===
When Nicholas II refused to revoke the February Manifesto, the Finns hoped that it should be at least defined exactly, which matters were included in state legislation. By enacting a new law the conflict between the February Manifesto and the 1869 dietary order could be resolved. Von Plehve, who had acted as minister-secretary of the state since 1899, decided in spring 1902 to support the idea of making the February Manifesto more exact in this way, because he thought this would calm the Finns down. The Senate of Finland made a proposal to the emperor about this in April 1902, but this never progressed any further during Bobrikov's lifetime. In autumn 1904 a Finnish-Russian committee led by the Russian legal scholar Nikolai Tagantsev was appointed to prepare a proposal about the matter. The committee decided in May 1905 to give its proposal to the Diet of Finland to review, so the common legislature could have legal standing according to the Finns' point of view. However, the Constitutionals did not support this, and after the 1905 Russian Revolution and the Great Strike in Finland had changed the situation, this effort was abandoned.

== Repeal of the manifesto ==
The February Manifesto remained in force until November 1905. After the Great Strike, Nicholas II gave a statement known as the November Manifesto on 4 November 1905, under which application of the February Manifesto was stopped for the time being, and the 1901 conscription law and some other decrees enacted after the February Manifesto were repealed. The fundamental statutes of the February Manifesto were permanently repealed by the March Manifesto following the February Revolution of 1917, even though the March Manifesto did not explicitly mention repealing the February Manifesto.

== Differences between historians' views ==
Documenting the history of independent Finland was long dominated by a "Finnish nationalist view of history", where the February Manifesto was seen as an illegal coup d'etat, judging by interpretations at its time. A "new way of research" rose to counter this in the 1960s, which has since become a more common view. Of historians, Osmo Jussila, Matti Klinge, Tuomo Polvinen, Päiviö Tommila, Toivo Nygård and Panu Pulma have viewed the significance the Finns gave to the February Manifesto at the time as exaggerated. The historians have seen the February Manifesto as having assembled, specified and clarified previously existing practices of enacting state legislation and being a logical consequence of long-time legal development. This "new way of research" has highlighted the point of view of the empire and also moved closer to the point of view of the Russian side of the legal dispute.

Historians Timo Soikkanen, Juhani Mylly, Mårten Ringbom and Aki Rasilainen have later defended the more traditional interpretation of the manifesto as a revolutionary turning point of the autonomy period, which discontinued constitutional government and changed the legal circumstances. The dispute about the significance of the manifesto has also been connected with broader differences in interpretation of the nature of Finnish autonomy, the definition of state legislation and whether the emperors ever had felt bound by the Finnish constitution dating back to Swedish rule. For example, according to Polvinen, the February Manifesto did not signify "any nation-wide change, as there had been state legislation and decrees even before", whereas Rasilainen thinks that uniform legislation predating the manifesto could not be seen as state legislation and the manifesto "eliminated the essence of the Finnish state" and "brought autocracy to Finland".
