= Boris Gyllenbögel =

Finnish Colonel, diplomat and principal

Karl Volter Boris Gyllenbögel (30 March 1884 Kauhajoki – 22 June 1948 Helsinki) was a Finnish Colonel, a Diplomat and a principal.

Gyllenbögel's parents were the police chief Karl Nathanael Gyllenbögel (1859-1926) and Alma Maria Rosenlund (1864-1941).

Gyllenbögel addended the Hamina Cadet School, St Petersburg Artillery Institute and the St Petersburg Academy of War. He served in Russia, among others, as Chief of Staff of the Emperor Nicholas I, as well as in military positions in Latvia and Lithuania.

Gyllenbögel, who was promoted to the Russian Imperial Army in 1917, was governor of the county of Uusimaa, but resigned in July 1917 after refusing to abolish parliament on the order of the Russian interim government.

After Finland became independent, Gyllenbögel was appointed Finland's Chargé d'Affaires to Poland in 1919 and he was then Finland's first Envoy in Warsaw between 1920 and 1921. After that, Gyllenbögel was Finnish Chargé d'Affaires to in Moscow but returned to Finland in 1922 at the request of the Soviet government and Antti Hackzell was appointed to replace him in Moscow.

After her diplomatic career, Gyllenbögel then served as Professor at the Helsinki Finnish Private School in 1924-1938 and taught languages at the school.

According to Gyllenbögel, the school received the nickname "Jylla" and this nickname has survived and its followers until today. The school is nowadays the name of Espoonlahti School and Espoonlahti high school.

The younger brother of Gyllenbögel, Evald Alfons Rafael Gyllenbögel (born 1889) was a Counselor who served as Finland's representative at the League of Nations and since 1932 as Head of the Political Department of the Foreign Ministry.
