= Robert Hermanson =

Finnish politician and lawyer

Robert Fredrik Hermanson (2 February 1846 – 10 December 1928) was a Finnish jurist and professor of constitutional law at the University of Helsinki. As a scholar he produced the principal systematic account of the public law of the Grand Duchy of Finland, which became an authoritative reference during the period of Russification in the late 19th and early 20th centuries. He sat in the Diet of Finland for the Clerical Estate from 1897 to 1906, chaired the Law Committee at the extraordinary Diet of 1899, and led the committee that drafted the Parliament Act of 1906 which established Finland's unicameral parliament.

== Background and studies ==
Born in Uleåborg (Oulu), Hermanson matriculated at the Imperial Alexander University in Finland (now the University of Helsinki) in 1861, taking the degree of Candidate of Philosophy in 1867 and Candidate of Laws in 1875. He was granted the title of vicehäradshövding in 1876. From 1867 to 1879 he was employed at the university library, a position he combined with his legal studies.

He prepared his doctoral thesis in 1878–1880 in Strasbourg under the German constitutional theorist Paul Laband, and obtained both his licentiate and doctorate in law in 1881. The dissertation, Om lagstiftningen, dess begrepp och förhållande till andra statliga funktioner ("On Legislation, Its Concept and Relation to Other Functions of the State"), was theoretical in approach and concerned with constructing a coherent conceptual framework for legislation as a state function.

== Professorship and scholarship ==
Hermanson was appointed docent in legal encyclopaedia and constitutional law in 1881 and, after defending the specimen work Om Finlands ständer, deras förhållande till monarken och folket ("On the Estates of Finland, Their Relation to the Monarch and the People"), professor of cameral and police jurisprudence and constitutional law in 1884. He held the chair until 1908; when it was divided in 1907, the administrative law portion was assigned to K. J. Ståhlberg — later the first President of Finland — while Hermanson continued for a further year with political theory and international law.

His principal works deal with the constitutional position of Finland and include Finlands statsrättsliga ställning ("The Constitutional Position of Finland", 1892), the polemical follow-up Bemötande i frågan om Finlands statsrättsliga ställning (1892), Svensk konungamakt, parlamentariskt styrelsesätt och folkviljan (1915), and the posthumously completed textbook Finlands statsförfattningsrätt (1924). His lectures on constitutional law were published in four volumes between 1893 and 1917. In 1919 he was invited to lecture at Uppsala University on Det rätta och dess samband med religiösa sanningar ("The Right and Its Connection with Religious Truths").

Methodologically a follower of Laband, Hermanson combined doctrinal analysis with attention to legal history and the historical origins of Finnish law. By the time of his death he was regarded as an international authority in legal history and constitutional law.

== Political and constitutional work ==
Hermanson was a member of numerous legal commissions on Finland's constitutional status. Serving on the Constitutional Commission of 1885–1886, he submitted a 143-page dissenting opinion in which he rejected the view — endorsed by the other members — that Finland and Russia formed a real union, arguing instead that Finland was a separate autonomous state. This interpretation became influential in Finnish historiography after independence.

He sat in the Clerical Estate of the Diet of Finland from 1897 to 1906. At the extraordinary Diet of 1899, convened in response to the February Manifesto by which Nicholas II sought to curtail Finnish legislative autonomy, Hermanson chaired the Law Committee and was central in drafting its constitutional reply. In 1904 he was appointed to a joint Russo-Finnish commission chaired by the Russian jurist Nikolai Tagantsev, tasked with delimiting the application of the manifesto; the commission was dissolved when constitutionalism was restored in Finland in 1905.

Between 1904 and 1905 Hermanson chaired the committee that prepared the Parliament Act of 1906, which abolished the four-estate Diet and introduced the unicameral Parliament of Finland elected by universal suffrage. He also chaired the Constitutional Law Committee at the Diets of 1905–1906. From 1906 to 1909 he served as an official assisting the Minister-Secretary of State in Saint Petersburg.

== After Finnish independence ==
After independence in 1917 Hermanson continued in public service. He represented Finland as a delegate in Geneva when the Åland Islands question was considered by the League of Nations in 1920–1921, and published I Ålandsfrågan ("On the Åland Question") in 1920. He also took part in the commission led by Antti Tulenheimo which examined the rights of the Finland-Swedish population; the 1923 report led to the establishment of a Swedish-language section at the National Board of Education, although the broader cultural autonomy sought by Swedish speakers was not achieved. To the report Hermanson attached a separate opinion. He further worked on guarantees for the Finnish-speaking population in Soviet Russia.

Hermanson died in Helsinki on 10 December 1928. By decision of the Council of State, he was given a state funeral.
