= Oathbreaker's flood =

1899 natural disaster in Finland

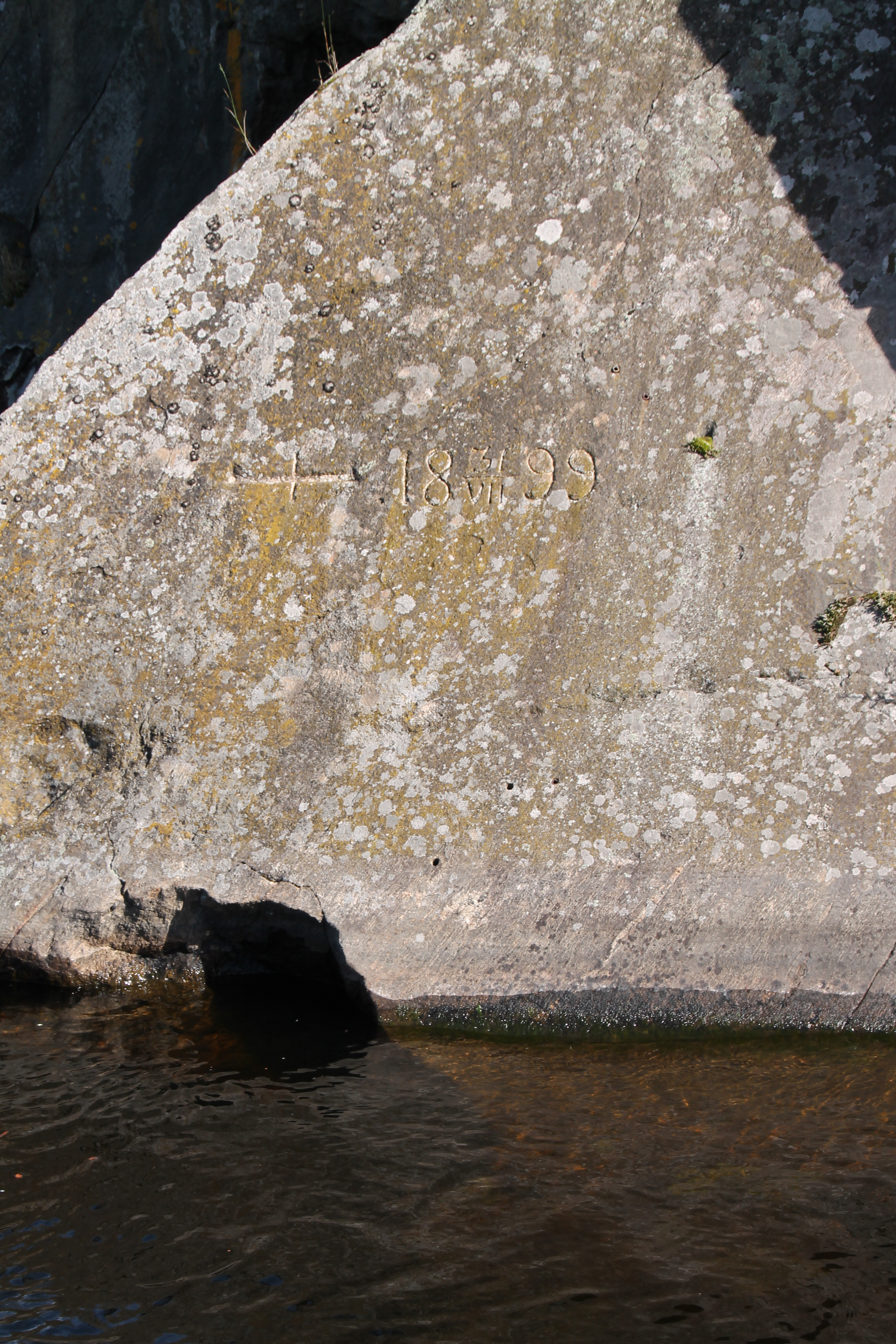
The water level during the Oathbreaker's flood on the cliff below the Olavinlinna castle. This picture was taken on 3 September 2016 showing the water level at the time as a comparison.

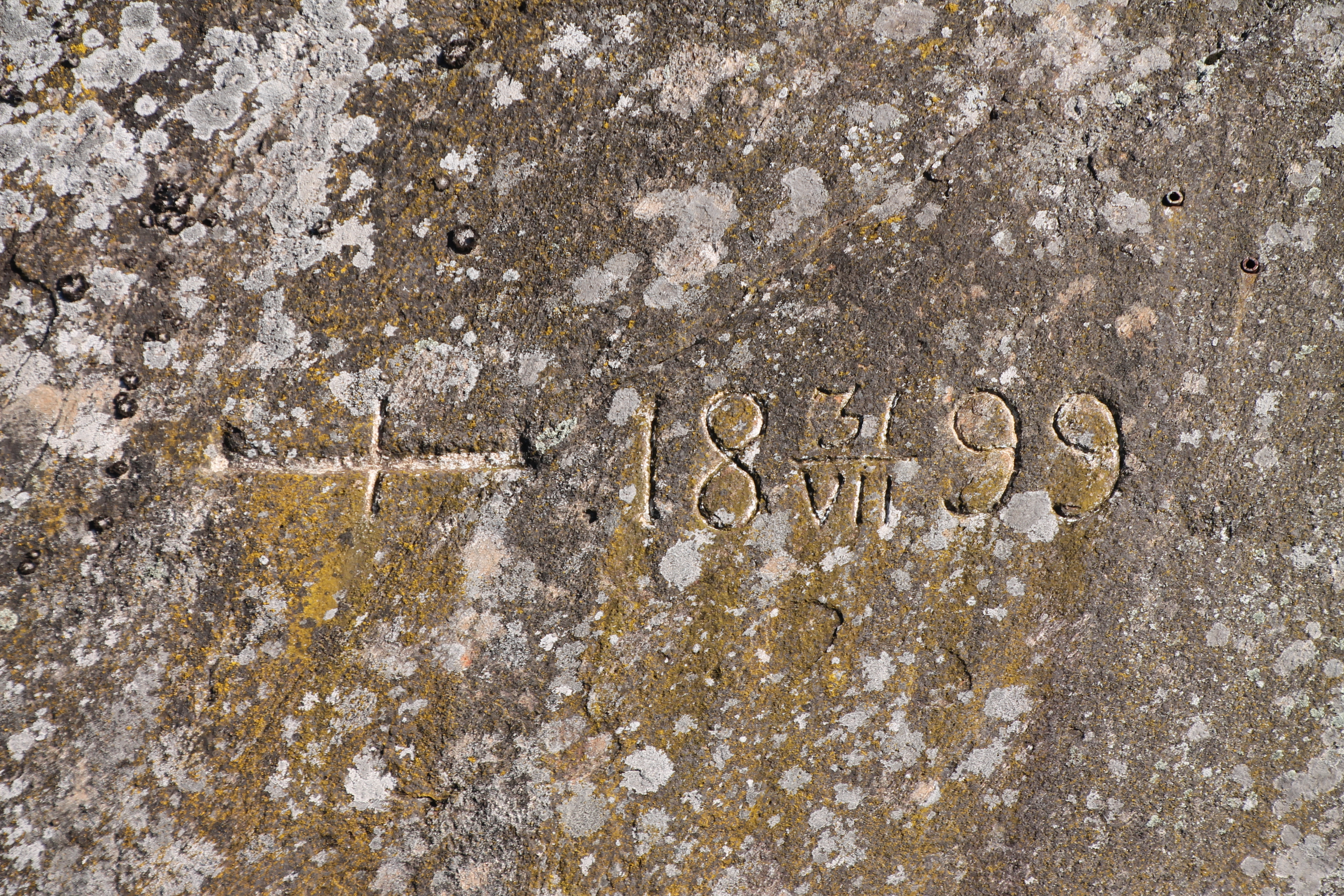
The date marked on the cliff. A detail from the above picture.

The Oathbreaker's flood (Finnish: Valapaton tulva) was a great flood that happened in Finland in spring 1899. The flood was named the "Oathbreaker's flood" because in February 1899, the Emperor of Russia and Grand Duke of Finland Nicholas II gave the February Manifesto, which narrowed the autonomous status of Finland and, as the Finns thought, broke the oath he had given when he ascended as the new emperor.

Reasons for the flood included numerous rainy preceding years, the snowy winter of 1898-1899 and the warm spring of 1899. The flood particularly concerned the water areas of the rivers Kokemäenjoki, Kymijoki and Vuoksi. For example the water level of the lake Päijänne was 193 cm higher than normal. This kind of flood is estimated to happen once every 100 to 150 years.

The Oathbreaker's flood was an important inspiration for the founding of the Hydrographic institute, the predecessor of the Finnish Environment Institute. The committee appointed by the Senate of Finland in 1899 to investigate the damages caused by the flood estimated the flood damages of the 1898-1899 period to be about 10 million markka.

The flood did not claim any human lives. Only one horse attached to a carriage drowned.

== Oathbreaker's lines ==
Oathbreaker's lines (Finnish: Valapaton viivat) are markings of record-high water surfaces marked on coastal cliffs in 1899. Many of these lines survive to this day, and they still mark the water level in 1899. Some of the lines were painted red.
