= Hannes Ignatius =

Finnish general (1871–1941)

Lieutenant General Johannes Ignatius
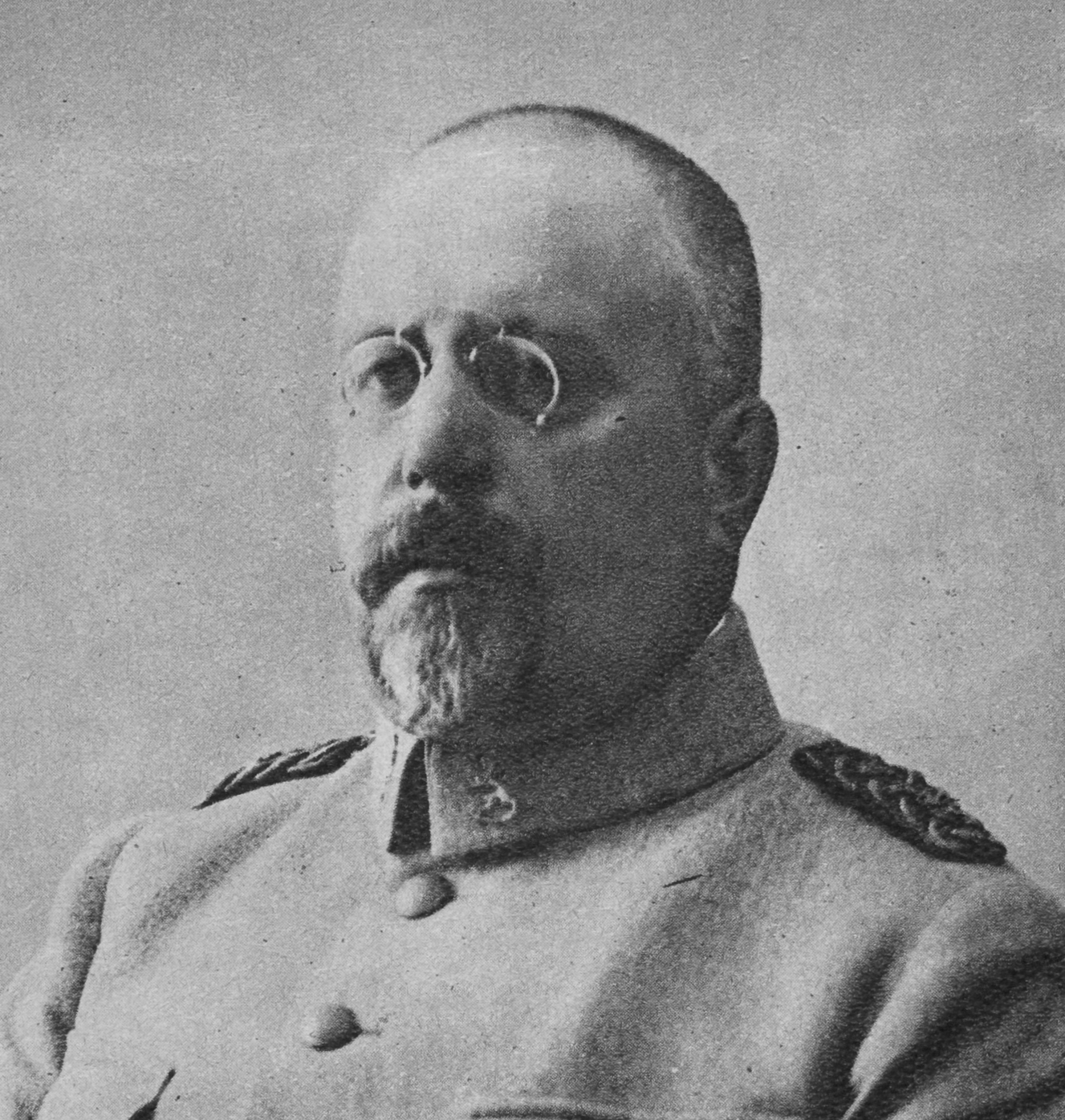
- Born: Johannes Ferdinand Ignatius; 1871
- Died: 1941 (aged 69–70) Helsinki
- Rank: Lieutenant General
- Commands: Quartermaster General; Chief of Staff

Johannes Ferdinand "Hannes" Ignatius (1871, Helsinki – 1941) was a Finnish soldier and a prominent advocate for Finnish independence.

== Biography ==
Ignatius was the son of the Fennophile Senator, Karl Ferdinand Ignatius, and Amanda Kristina Bergman. Ignatius received his military education at The Hamina Cadet School from 1885–1892, and at the Nicholas Academy of General Staff in St Petersburg from 1896–1899.

=== Military service ===
Ignatius served in the Finnish Dragoon Regiment from 1892 to 1901. He was promoted to captain in 1900. After the abolition of the military of the Grand Duchy of Finland, he sought a career in business from 1901–1917. During World War I, Ignatius was a prominent member of the Military Committee working for the independence of Finland and was promoted to colonel and then major general in 1918. Ignatius served as the quartermaster general of the White Army during the Finnish Civil War from the 18 February until 6 May 1918, and as Chief of Staff from May 1918 to June 1918. During the Winter War, Ignatius again held the post of Chief of Staff.

Ignatius was the chairman of the publishing committee of Suomen Vapaussota 1918 (The Finnish War of Independence). In 1918 he wrote the book Gustaf Mannerheim. He was one of the most enthusiastic supporters of Mannerheim in the 1920s and 1930s.
