= Kasten Antell =

Finnish politician and colonel

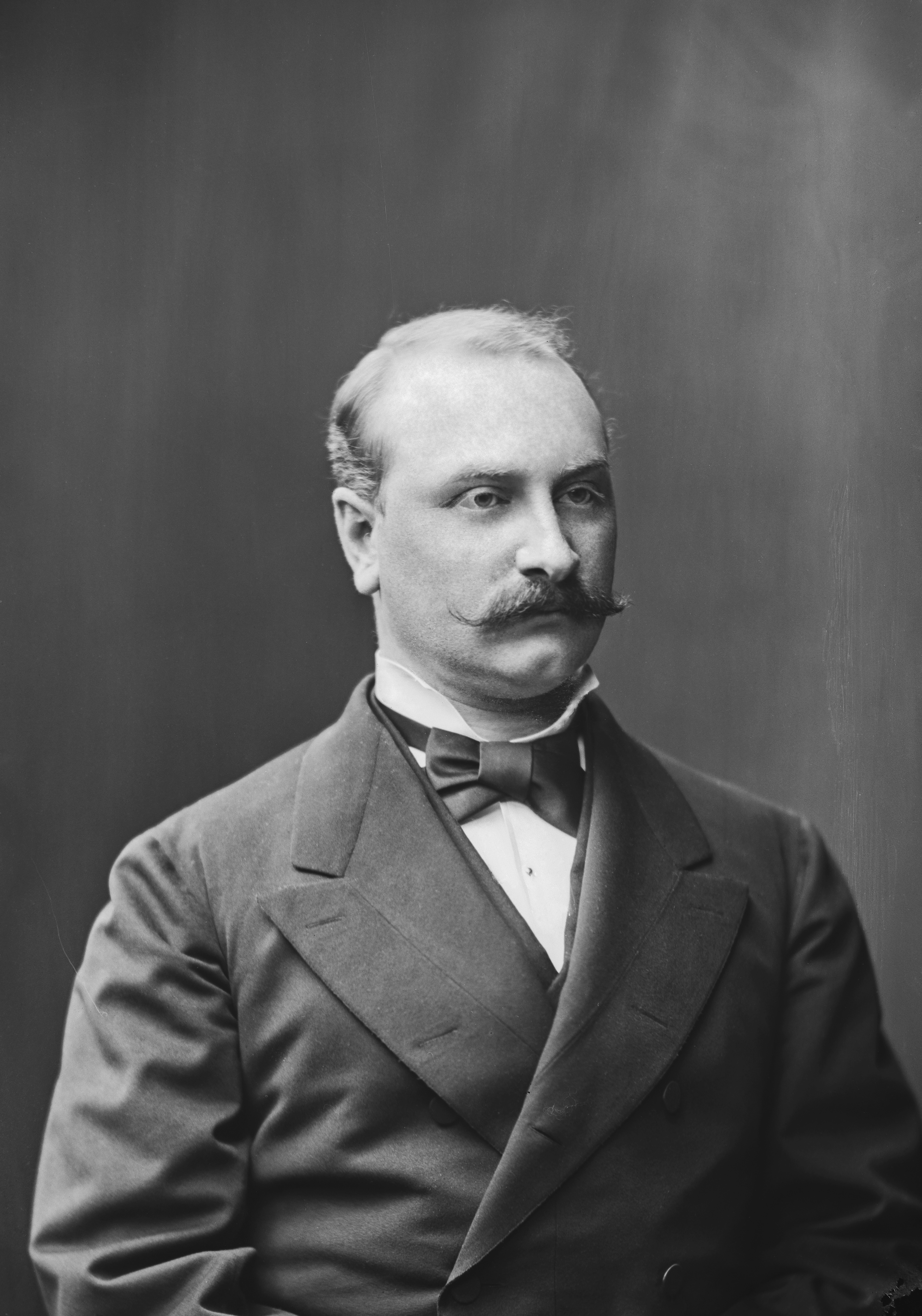
Kasten Antell in 1878

Per Kasten Samuel Antell (12 May 1845, Helsinki – 20 November 1906) was a Finnish politician and colonel. He was a member of the Senate of Finland. He was also head of the finance department in the Leo Mechelin's Senate in 1905.

== Early life and family ==
Antell was born into an influential political family as the eldest son of senator Samuel Henrik Antell and Fanny Alexandra Helena Wallenius.

In 1872 he married Baroness Emilia Sofia de la Chapelle (1853–1919), thereby uniting two prominent Senate dynasties and their considerable fortunes.

== Military career ==
After graduating from the Hamina Cadet School in 1863 Antell joined the Semyonovsky Life Guards Regiment, serving as a lieutenant from 1863 to 1869. etached to the staff of the Governor-General of Finland in 1870, he undertook special assignments until 1876. He was promoted to major in 1870, lieutenant colonel in 1873 and colonel in 1876, when he resigned his commission.

== Banking and business ==
Antell headed the Finnish Hypothec Association (Suomen Hypoteekkiyhdistys) from 1884 until his death in 1906, steering the mortgage bank through a period of rapid industrial expansion.

== Political career ==
=== Diet and municipal service ===
Elected by right of birth to represent the nobility, Antell sat in every session of the Diet of Finland from 1877–1878 to 1905–1906 and served as deputy lord marshal (varamaamarsalkka) in 1900.

In Helsinki he was a city councillor in 1890–1892 and 1898–1903, acting as council chairman from 1900 to 1903.

=== National offices ===
Antell chaired the Board of the Finnish House of Nobility (Ritarihuone) from 1897 to 1906 and was appointed to two state commissions: the Dandeville committee on military affairs (1898) and the Tagantsev committee on legal codification (1904–1905).

Following the general strike of 1905 he entered the reform-minded Mechelin Senate as chief of the Finance Department, playing a key role in stabilising public finances during the transition to constitutional government.
