= Waldemar Becker =

Finnish soldier and politician (1840–1907)

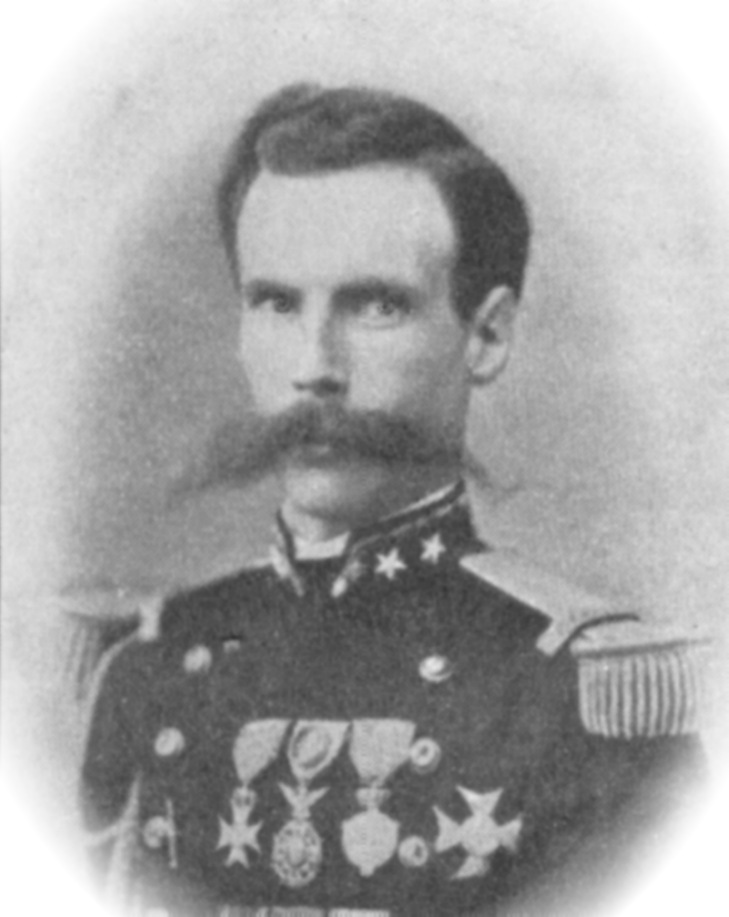
Waldemar Becker in the uniform of the Serbian Army

Evert Gustav Waldemar Becker (6 April 1840 – 22 February 1907), also known as Becker-Bei and Ilmarinen, was a Finnish soldier, politician and adventurer. During his lifetime, he was active on several continents and fought in the armies of multiple countries.

== Early life and military career in Finland ==
Evert Gustav Waldemar Becker was born in Helsinki, Grand Duchy of Finland, to alikapteeni Gabriel Julian Wilhelm Becker and Kristina Fredrika Reuterskiöld. He began his military career as a young student in Finland Cadet School which he completed in 1858. Becker was appointed Second Lieutenant in the Finnish Guard. After a short time in St. Petersburg, he went to Africa and fought there for the Spanish troops in Morocco in the Hispano-Moroccan War of 1859–1860. After returning to St. Petersburg, he was recruited in the Grodno Hussar regiment and from there went on to study in the General Staff Academy. In 1862, he fled with an officer's Russian wife, traveling via Finland and Sweden to New York, and as a result he was declared a military deserter. From the United States, Becker ended up in Mexico.

== Military career in Mexico ==
In Mexico, Becker attended the ongoing war in the forces of Mexico's second emperor Maximilian (emperor 1864–1867), backed by France and Spain, against the republican army led by Mexico's legitimate president Benito Juárez. He was captured by General Vicente Riva Palacio in the early stages of the war, but he was freed in an exchange of war prisoners. In the end of the war, he was again taken prisoner and was sentenced to death but pardoned. Becker was able to return to Europe about five years after arriving in Mexico.

== Return to Europe ==
While in Mexico, Becker had gotten married and converted to the Catholic faith. After returning to Europe, he settled in Paris, where conservative circles reinforced his catholic sentiments and he went to Rome. In Rome, Becker joined the Papal Swiss Guard, which, however, he resigned after half a year to go to fight on behalf of the Greeks against the Turks. In the Greek army, Becker operated as the Greek government's advisor. The Greek Government did not accept Becker's plans, so he returned to Paris and began supporting the conservative faction in Spain and Don Carlos with newspaper articles.

== Back to the military ==
In 1871, Becker went to fight against Turkey in the Egyptian Army. Success, however, was not remarkable. With the recommendation of the ambassador of Russia in Constantinople, Count Ignatiev, Becker moved to serve in Serbia's army headquarters, where he began to carry out reforms in the Serbian army. At the same time, Becker exerted pressure on the Serbian government to declare the war against Turkey. Becker was appointed as the Chief of Staff of the Serbian Army Headquarters, but was forced to resign, however, after argument with the Serbian king. Since then, even the Russian army did not want to employ him. Becker went to Greece, where plans were underway for the Balkan League and an attack against Turkey. The plans, however, fell after Russia initiated peace talks.

== Back to Paris ==
After the cancellation of the Balkan League and the attack against Turkey, Becker returned to Paris, where his friends got him a position as a political journalist in the L'Estafette magazine. At the same time, Becker wrote to a number of other newspapers and magazines and books. The writings attracted attention and debate, but the special attention and outcry was raised by his 1880 article "La Finlande indépendante et neutre". In his writing, Becker predicted fairly accurately the future Russian oppression in Finland, and at the same time called the Finns to arms in order to obtain complete freedom and acquire guarantees of neutrality from the Great powers. In the difficult years that followed the publication, Becker earned his living as a journalist in both France and Spain, writing especially about Balkan affairs.

== Years of Russification in Finland ==
During the Russian Oppression, Becker wrote of the Finnish question behind the pseudonym Ilmarinen. For the rest of his life, Becker lived in Naples, Italy, using his writings to raise awareness of Finnish affairs. He died in Rome, Italy, in 1907.

== Personal life ==
Becker was said to be a highly skilled and versatile expert in high-level politics. He has also been described as intelligent, multilingual, and a charming companion, but lacking perseverance and the necessary adaptability.

Becker was married in 1866 to a Mexican, Maria Conception Adorno, and since 1889 to a widow of a Greek banker, Anna Komnenos. After the death of Becker's widow in 1929 their ashes were brought to Finland for burial in 1931.

== Books ==
- Ilmarinen, La Russie, son passé, son présant / par Ilmarinen. Neapel: [s.n.], 1906.
- Waldemar Becker, L'Albanie et les Albanais / par le Colonel [W.] Becker. Paris: Dentu, 1880.
- Waldemar Becker, Poezdka vostzejskìa gubernìi / V. Bekkeri. Moskva: [s.n.], 1852 (tipografía V. Göte)

== Sources ==
- Becker, Erik: Becker-Bei – suomalainen sotilas ja poliitikko. Karisto, Hämeenlinna, 1968
- Duarte Soto, Crispin; Coronel Nicolás Romero, episodios heroicos 1998.
