= Arvid Neovius =

Finnish journalist and politician (1861–1916)

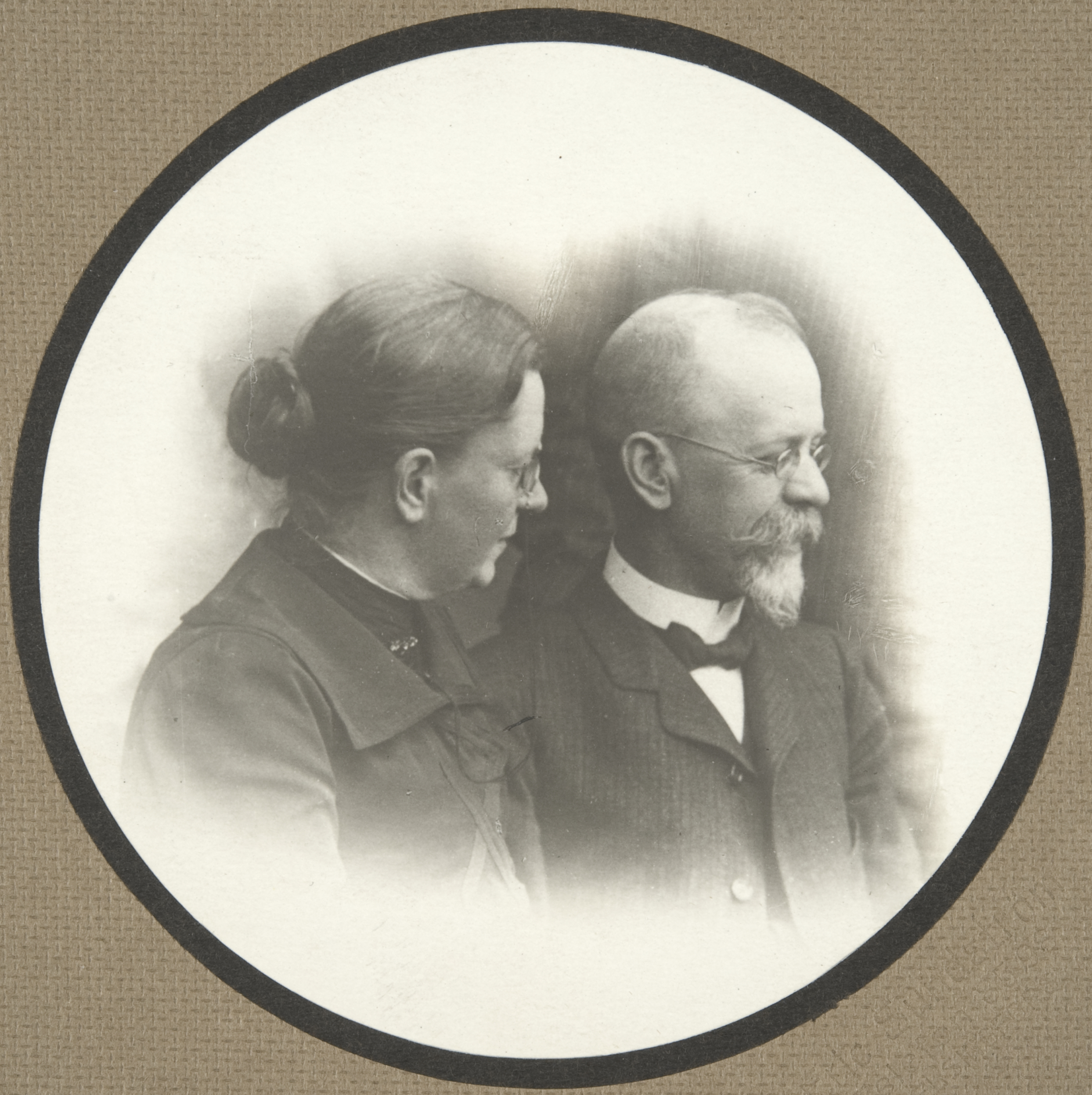
Dagmar and Arvid Neovius (1911)

Arvid Werner Neovius (27 June 1861 – 28 January 1916) was a Finnish journalist and politician, born in Saint Petersburg. He was a member of the Diet of Finland in 1900 and from 1905 to 1906 and of the Parliament of Finland from 1907 until his death in 1916, representing the Swedish People's Party of Finland. He was the elder brother of Dagmar Neovius.
