= Virallinen lehti =

Government gazette of Finland

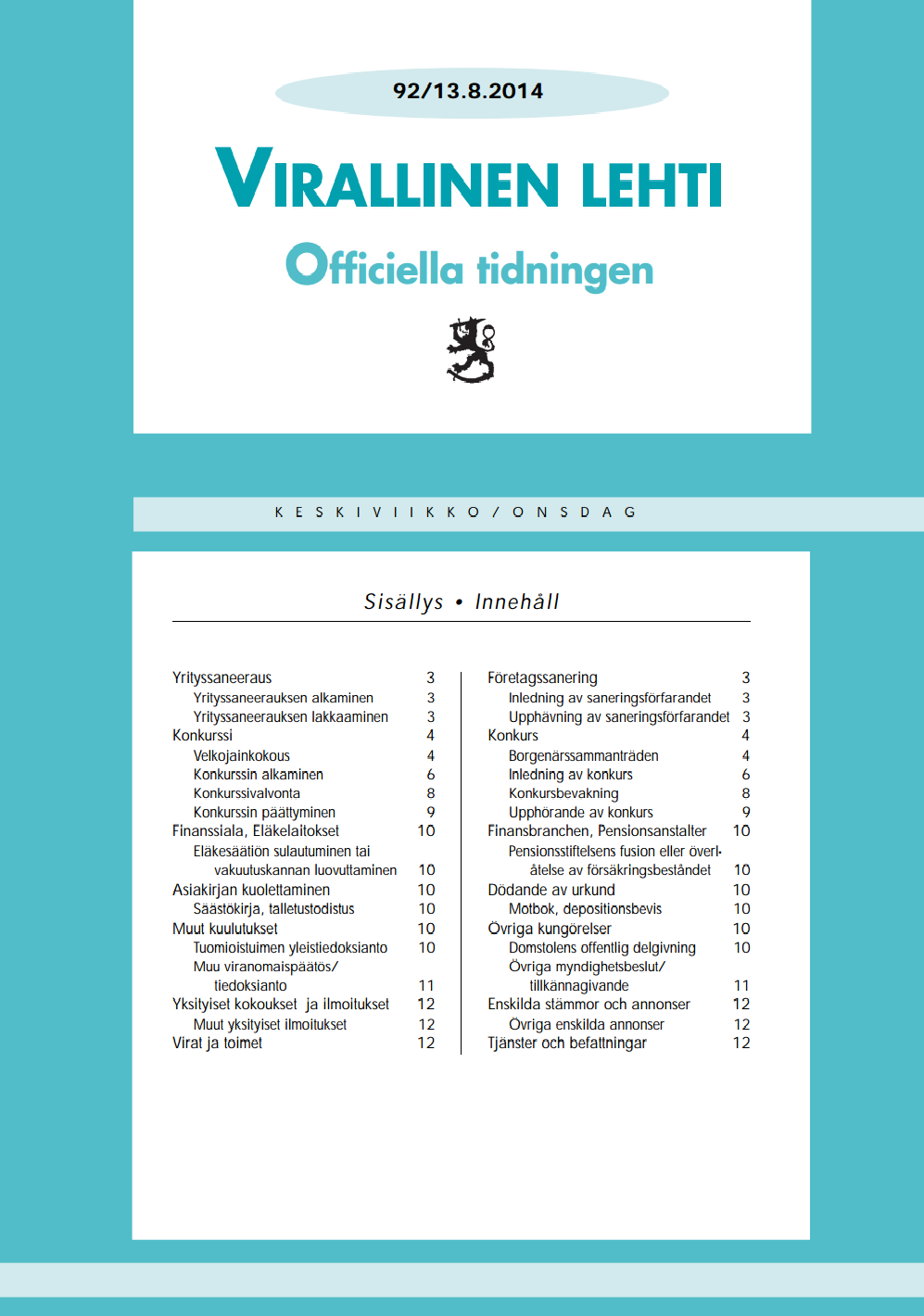
Cover from 2014.

Virallinen lehti (Finnish pronunciation: [ˈʋirɑlːinen ˈlehti], Swedish: Officiella tidningen, English: Official newspaper) is the official journal of Finland. It is published by Edita Publishing Oy. It is published on Mondays, Wednesdays and Fridays. From 2019, it will only be published electronically, and only on Tuesdays and Fridays.

Virallinen lehti was first published in 1820 in the Swedish language with the name Finlands officiella tidning, and is the oldest still published newspaper in Finland. The first issue was published on 3 January 1820. Originally, it contained general interest articles and fiction in addition to official announcements.

In 1856, emperor Alexander II decided that an official journal in the Finnish language would also be needed. The first issue of Suomen Julkisia Sanomia was published in November that year. It changed its name into Suomen Wirallinen lehti in 1866.

The current law defining the official journal was made in 1931. The earlier Finnish and Swedish journals were combined and named Virallinen lehti — Officiella tidningen.
