= August Nybergh =

Finnish politician (1851–1920)

August Nybergh (20 August 1851 in Heinola – 5 December 1920 in Helsinki) was a Finnish jurist, senator in the Grand Duchy of Finland, Member of Parliament and the first president of the Supreme Court of Finland.
