= Karl Ferdinand Ignatius =

Finnish historian

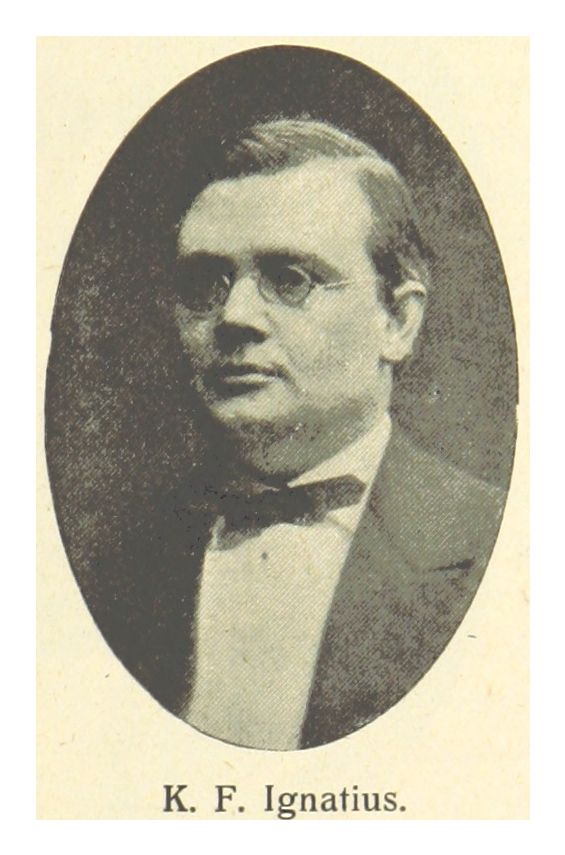
- Born: 27 September 1837; Pori, Grand Duchy of Finland, Russian Empire (now Finland)
- Died: 11 September 1909 (aged 71); Helsinki, Grand Duchy of Finland, Russian Empire (now Finland)

Karl Emil Ferdinand Ignatius (27 September 1837 – 11 September 1909) was a Finnish historian, the head of the Main Office of Statistics and a Senator.

== Biography ==
Ignatius was born in Pori, the son of vice-pastor Johan Ferdinand Ignatius and Sofia Fleming. He graduated secondary school in 1855 and enrolled in the Imperial Alexander University in Helsinki, gaining his undergraduate and graduate degrees in 1860, a Licenciate degree in 1862 and finally his Ph.D. in 1864. Ignatius worked as a civil servant in the Finnish Main Office of Statistics from 1865 to 1868 and then as the head of the office from 1868 to 1885. He was the head of the chamber committee of the Senate of Finland during 1885–1900 and 1905–1908. Ignatius worked also as a Docent of Nordic History and Statistics from 1865 to 1870 and as the Curator of the Western Finland's Student Nation (combination of Turkulainen and Satakuntalainen Osakunta during 1846–1904) from 1868 to 1870.

Ignatius took part in the Diet of Finland as a member of the burghers estate in 1877–1885 and 1904–1905. He was also a member of the Helsinki City Council during 1875–1878 and 1903–1905. Ignatius was among of the founders of both the Finnish Historical and Geographical Societies, was a committee member of the Society for Culture and Education (Kansanvalistusseura) during 1873–1887 and was the Chairman of the Finnish Antiquarian Society in 1875–1885. He died in Helsinki, aged 71.

== Family ==
Ignatius married Amanda Kristina Bergman (1841–1921) in 1863. The couple had five daughters and five sons, the most famous of them being the President of the Court of Appeals Kaarlo Yrjö Benedictus Ignatius (1869–1942), Lieutenant General Hannes Ignatius (1871–1941) and Provincial Governor Gustaf Ignatius (1873–1949).

== Works ==
- Bidrag till södra Österbottens äldre historia (1861)
- Finlands historia under Karl X Gustafs regering (1865)
- Renseignements sur la population de Finlande (1869)
- Statistisk handbok för Finland (1872)
- Storfurstendömet Finland. Statistiska anteckningar (1876)
- Le Grand-duchiè de Finlande, notice statistique (1878)
- Suomen maantiede kansalaisille 1. (1880–1890)
- Oikea tie (1902)

== See also ==
- Karl Ferdinand Ignatius in 375 humanists – 11 May 2015. Faculty of Arts, University of Helsinki.
