= Lennart Gripenberg =

Finnish politician

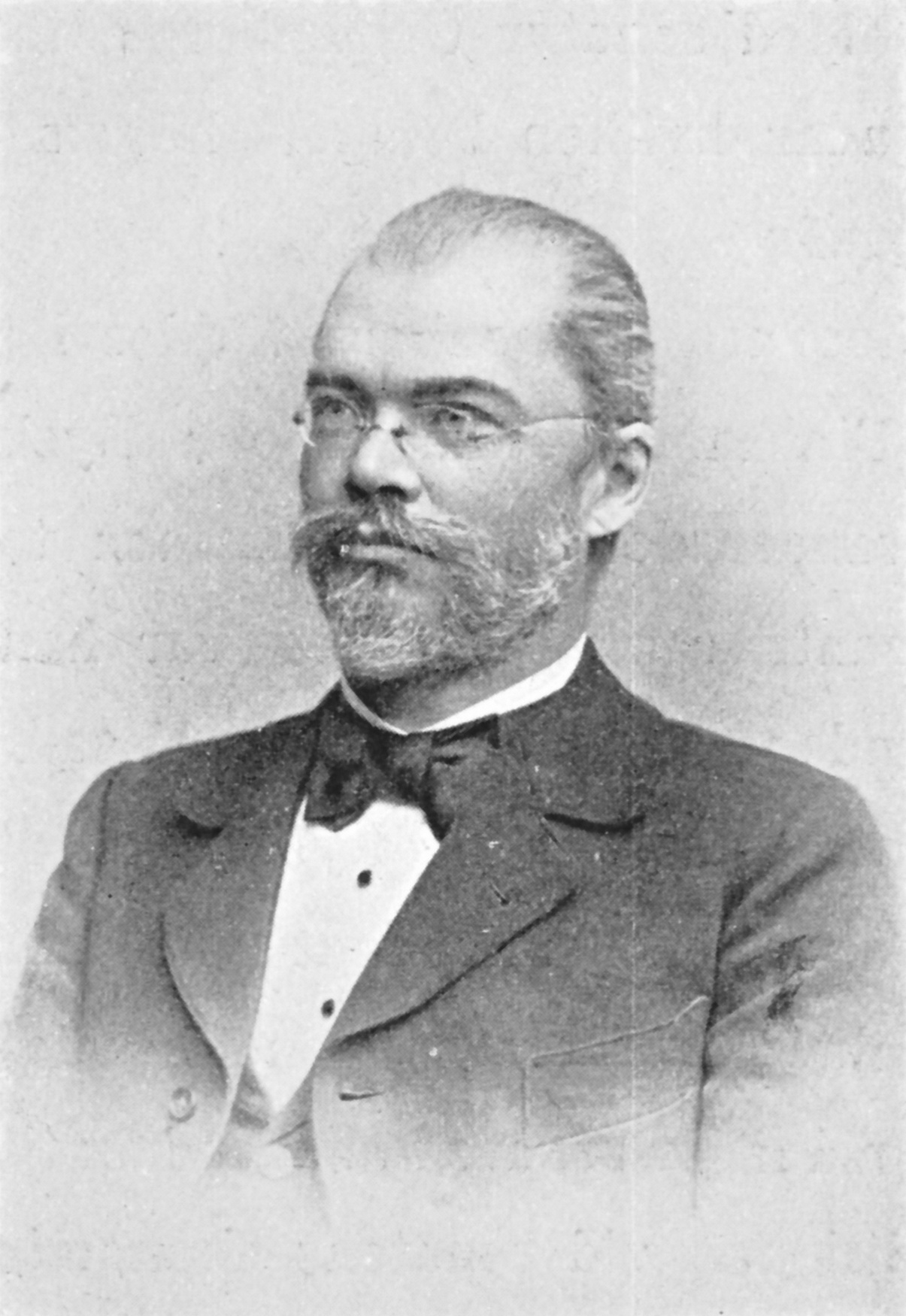
Lennart Gripenberg

Lennart Gripenberg (15 September 1852 in Oulu – 14 September 1933) was a Finnish politician. He was a member of the Senate of Finland.
