= Hamina Cadet School =

Former Finnish military academy

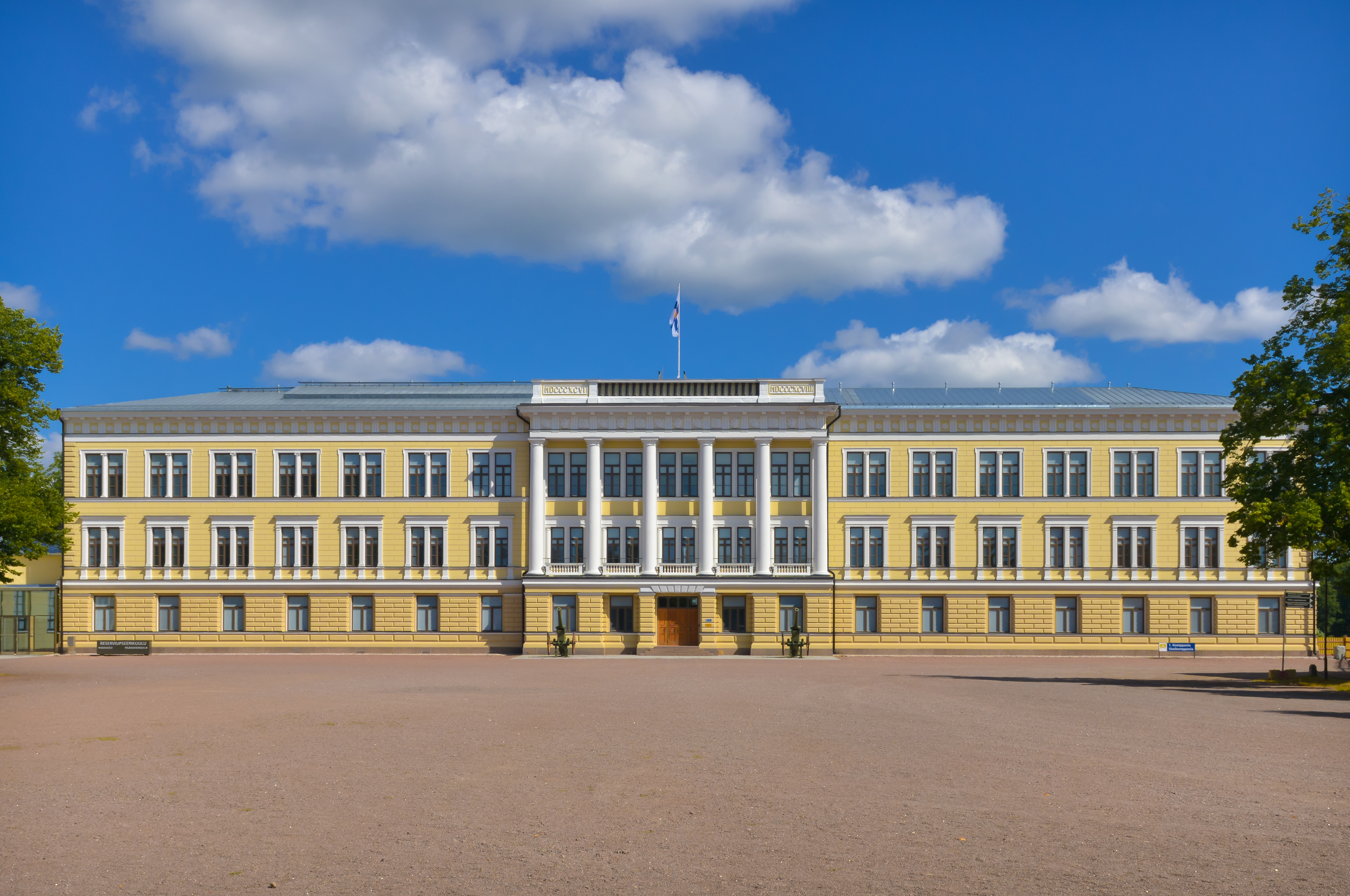
Main building of the reserve officers school

Hamina Cadet School, known in Swedish at the time as Finska kadettkåren vid Fredrikshamn, 1819–1901. The Cadet School was founded in 1780 by Georg Magnus Sprengtporten at Kuopio and transferred in 1781 to Rantasalmi where it was called Svedjehamn Cadet School. In 1819, after the School was transferred to Hamina (Swedish: Fredrikshamn) the name was changed accordingly, in common usage.

== Republic of Finland ==
After Finnish independence in 1917 the Cadet school was moved to Santahamina in Helsinki.

In the 1920 the premises were occupied by the Reserve Officer School of the newly formed Finnish defence forces. Today the main building of the Cadet school hosts the headquarters of the Reserve Officer School of the Finnish Army.

Hamina Cadet School was abolished in 1903 with the abolition of the separate Army of the Grand duchy of Finland as part of the Russification policy. The conscription of Finnish soldiers directly to various units of the Russian Empire was seen as illegal and unconstitutional in Finland. Finnish officers protested first in through mass resignations and later through a strategy of disobedience, in what is now known as the conscription strikes. Finally it was settled that the Grand Duchy of Finland would fulfil its obligation to the common defence with a monetary compensation to the Russian Empire instead through the provision of conscripts.

== Significance ==
Many of the officers from the Fredrikshamn Cadet school played an important part in the early independence movement of Finland; both in the administration of the Grand Duchy as well as in active support of the resistance.

In 1917 when the Russian Empire broke apart and Finland gained its independence, as the highest ranking Finnish officer at the time, Mannerheim was called by the Senate to organise the Civil Guard into a new Finnish army. Until early 1917 Mannerheim was a general in the Imperial Russian Army commanding Russian cavalry troops in the southern front. After the abdication of the Tsar Nicholas II in March, he returned to Finland.

Some other former Hamina cadets such as Carl Enckell, Rudolf Walden, and Hannes Ignatius would rise to the occasion, but their effect was due to individual abilities. Most reliable Finnish officers from Hamina were too old and retired from active duty to form an effective core for the new Finnish army.

The field command of the new army had to be formed from the members in the Finnish Jäger troops. These were men who had travelled as individuals to Germany 1915-1917 to receive training in the German army in order to liberate Finland. Jäger troops had fought against the Russian Empire. Those Finnish officers who had continued to serve in the Russian army were seen unpatriotic and considered unreliable by the Jäger.

Therefore, at first there was a certain degree of distrust between Mannerheim's headquarters and the younger, mainly Finnish speaking, generation of Jäger officers. However the differences never surfaced during the war of 1918. After the Whites' victory in that war, Mannerheim resigned as Commander-in-Chief, dismayed at the increasing German influence in Finnish military and political affairs.

After the fall of the German Empire later in 1918 the background of individual officers lost its political significance. Mannerheim was called in to be the Regent of Finland. Army of Finland and the Civil Guard were organised by Mannerheim and Walden as the Minister of Defence. However jäger officers continued to form the basis of the officer core.

== Notable Hamina cadets ==
- Field Marshal Mannerheim was a cadet at Hamina cadet school. Due to a disciplinary breach he was expelled in his final year in 1886, which caused him to continue his military career in the Imperial Russian Army.
- Hugo Robert Standertskjöld colonel, business magnate, and owner of Aulanko.
- Alexander Järnefelt was a Finnish topographical officer who made a topographic survey of large swathes of Bulgaria in the late 1870s. In the 1880s, he served as a governor in several Finnish provinces, advancing the programme of the Fennoman movement forcefully, ending his career as a senator of the Senate of Finland
- Karl Fredrik Wilkama was a Finnish general who graduated from Hamina Cadet School in 1896. He served in the Imperial Russian Army and returned to Finland after independence. Wilkama fought in the Finnish Civil War on the White side, where he played a key role in organizing cavalry units. After the war, he held several senior positions in the Finnish General Staff. Wilkama was appointed Commander of the Finnish Army in 1919, 1924, and 1925, overseeing the early development of Finland’s defense forces. He retired from active service in 1926 but remained influential in military circles. His brother, Oskar Wilkama, also graduated from Hamina Cadet School and had a notable military career in Finland. He served as an officer in the Finnish Army and held various command positions. Oskar served in the Imperial Guard Cavalry and was a riding instructor at the Russian imperial court. He also competed for Russia in the 1912 Stockholm Olympics.
- Carl Enckell, a politician, officer and a diplomat, graduated as an officer from Hamina Cadet School after which he served in the Imperial Russian Army learning fluent Russian. In 1917 Enckell negotiated for Finnish independence in Saint Petersburg in the position of Finnish Minister Secretary of State and representative of Senate of Finland. Later he served Finland on several occasions as the minister of foreign affairs and as the Finnish delegate to the League of Nations.
- General Rudolf Walden received his military education at Hamina Cadet School 1892-1900. He was the best of his class. Walden was dismissed from service in 1902, in connection with a conscription strike. After leaving the army Walden had a notable career in business.
- General Hannes Ignatius received his military education at Hamina Cadet School 1885-1892, and in the Nicholas General Staff Academy in St Petersburg 1896-1899. Served in the Finnish Dragoon Regiment 1892-1901 after which he was a businessman.
- Vilhelm Aleksander Thesleff received his military education at Hamina Cadet School from 1894–1901, and in the Nicholas Academy of General Staff in St.Petersburg 1904-1907, and the Officers Cavalry School 1910-1911. He was a Finnish general, first Minister of Defence of Finland and briefly the commander in chief of the Finnish army in 1918.
- Waldemar Becker graduated from the Hamina Cadet School in 1858, served in the Finnish Guard and then in the Nicholas General Staff Academy. Deserted Russian army in 1862 after which he served with several different regimes and armies on four continents, including France, Spain, Mexico, Egypt and Serbia.
- Johan Mauritz Nordenstam graduated from Hamina Cadet School in 1823, served in the Russian army in two wars, and went on to be the longest-serving head of the Senate of Finland, effectively prime minister, from 1858 to 1882.
