= Nikolai Tagantsev =

Russian lawyer and criminologist (1843–1923)

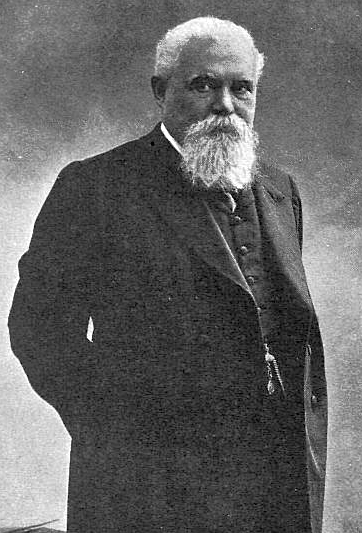
Nikolai Tagantsev

Nikolai Stepanovich Tagantsev (Russian: Николай Степанович Таганцев) was born in Penza on 19 February 1843. He was a Russian lawyer, legal scholar, and criminologist.

In 1887, Tagantsev was appointed a senator in the Criminal Cassation Department of the Russian Empire's Governing Senate, and went on to become the department's principal member. He was one of the authors of the Russian penal code of 1903, and became a member of the State Council in 1906.

Tagantsev died on 22 March 1923 in Petrograd.
