= Finnish corvette Kalevala =

Finnish navy corvette

Kalevala, a.k.a. "Calevala" (Russian: Калевала), was a propeller-operated corvette of the Finnish navy. The construction of it was completed in 1858 at Turku Old Shipyard, Finland. From 1860 to 1865, the corvette served in the Pacific Fleet of Russia. At the time, Finland was an autonomous grand duchy (1809-1917) within the Russian Empire.

== Construction and launching of Kalevala ==
The corvette was designed by the ship designer Jörgensen, under the auspices of the Finnish Vice Admiral Johan Eberhard von Schantz (1802-1880), who was promoted to admiral in 1866. The construction of the vessel was funded by the Senate of Finland. The total cost of the ship's construction was 342'804 Russian silver rubles (the Finnish Markka became the currency of Finland from 1860 onward). The corvette had 15 cannons. The displacement of the vessel was 1500 tons. The ship was set afloat on July 2, 1858. In December, 1858, the Military Commissary of Finland hired machinists and boiler-men to work on the ship. In March, 1859, offers of food supplies for the crew were solicited. In the early summer of 1859, the steam engines of the vessel were tested at the Baltic Sea waters near Kronstadt. From the start, Finnish Baron Otto Carpelan operated as the captain of the ship. Finnish Paul Karl Toppelius (later promoted to rear admiral) became the head of the officers serving on the ship. Still during the springtime of 1860, machinists were hired for the ship's sailing season of 1860.

== Kalevala in the Pacific Fleet of Russia ==
=== Kalevala in the Russian Far East ===
With the 1858 Peace Treaty of Aigun and the 1860 Peace Treaty of Peking, Russia extended its territories in the Far East. Unexpectedly, in 1860 Kalevala was pointed in the service of the Pacific Fleet of Russia, with new home port in Nikolayevsk-on-Amur in the Russian Far East. Baron Otto Carpelan remained the captain of Kalevala on the sail of the vessel from Kronstadt at the Baltic Sea to the vessel's new home port on the Russian coast of the Pacific Ocean. The long journey started from Kronstadt on October 18, 1860. In addition to Kalevala, the squadron heading to the Far East consisted of two other corvettes, Bogatyr and Rynda, as well as two clippers, Finnish-built Abrek (built in Pori in 1860) and its model vessel Gaidamak, which had been obtained from England.

The voyage was headed by Rear Admiral Andrei Alexandrovitš Popov. According to at least one Russian source, Otto Carpelan continued as the captain of Kalevala beyond this voyage, in the duties assigned for the vessel in the service of the Russian Pacific Fleet. According to another source, also Vladimir Davydov skippered Kalevala, and from 1863 also Fedor Želtuhin (Федор Николаевич Желтухин). In June, 1861, a year after the first Russian military camp had been established in Vladivostok, on the Pacific coast of the Russian Far East, the crew of Kalevala erected the first church of the future city. The construction of the church was completed together with local soldiers from Vladivostok. In 1863, the crew of Kalevala mapped the islands around Vladivostok. At that time, a bay in the area was named after Kalevala. It is located in the Posjet Bay, which is a part of the Peter the Great Gulf.

=== Finnish seamen and vessels in Russian America ===
Russian America was the name of Russian colonial possessions in North America from 1733 to 1867, that today is the U.S. State of Alaska and settlements in California (1) and Hawaii (3 - starting in 1817) (distant from the North American landmass in the Pacific Ocean and therefore more commonly associated with the other territories of Oceania). Formal incorporation of the possessions by Russia did not take place until the establishment of the Russian-American Company (RAC) in 1799. Finnish Chief Managers ("governors") of Russian America included Arvid Adolf Etholén (a.k.a. Etolin) in 1840-1845 and Johan Hampus Furuhjelm in 1859-1864. A third Finn, Johan Joachim von Bartram, declined the offer for the five-year term between 1850 and 1855. All three were high ranking Imperial naval officers. Researcher Maria J. Enckell states the following about the Finns in the Russian-American Company:

"Russia relied heavily on Finnish seamen. These seamen manned Russian naval ships as well as its deep-sea-going vessels. Company records show that in the early 1800s these ships were crewed predominantly by merchant seamen from Finland. From 1840 onward the Company’s around-the-world ships were manned entirely by Finnish merchant skippers and crews. Most Company ships stationed in Sitka and the Northern Pacific were likewise manned by Finnish skippers and Finnish crews."

"Significant too is that from the early 1800s the Finnish seamen sailing these ships had journeyed up and down the North and South American coasts. Salt, used by the Company in preserving pelts, was obtained on islands in Baja California. Fort Ross in Bodega Bay, just north of San Francisco, was a stop on that route until 1841 when the fort was sold to the “swindler” Johann Sutter, on whose land the first California Gold was found. Thus, all Finnish seamen plying these waters knew every nook and cranny on these shores. Similarly they knew equally well the coast on the Asiatic side. Returning to Finland on their mandatory around-the-world journeys, they spread the news of the riches they had seen."

"San Francisco’s harbor records and the Russian Consular records display the names of many Finnish and Baltic Russian Alaska skippers busily plying the waters between San Francisco, Petropavlovsk, Nikolajefsk and Vladivostok." ... "Long before the turn of the century 11% of San Francisco’s seaman community were Finns. The commercial activities of these former Finnish Russian-American Company skippers and their men were impressive. At least two are known to have become multimillionaires: Gustaf Nybom (later Niebaum), the founder of Inglenook wineries, and Otto Wilhelm Lindholm of Vladivostok. Their business ventures had interests spread across the Northern Pacific. This activity continued until 1922 and the Soviet terror, when Vladivostok's numerous Finns and Manchurians were rounded up, marched to the central square and shot."

In 1817-1818, Arvid Adolf Etholén skippered the Russian frigate Kamchatka from Kronstadt to the Alaskan port of Sitka, the capital of Russian America, known as Novoarkhangelsk ("New Archangel") under Russian rule. As a captain of several ships, Etholén then sailed from Sitka to California, Sandwich Islands and other areas, and in 1821-1823 he explored and mapped the utmost northwestern edges of the Pacific Rim of North America, between Alaska and the Bering Strait. In 1824, Etholén skippered the Finnish-built brig Baikal from Sitka to California, and the following year the frigate Kreiser from Sitka to Kronstadt. After having been pointed the Chief Manager ("governor") of Russian America, Etholén skippered the Finnish-built vessel Nikolai I ("Nicolai") from Kronstadt to Sitka in 1939-1940. On the same day with Nikolai I, also the Russian ship Konstantin arrived in Sitka, under the command of Finnish Johan Joachim von Bartram (who later declined the opportunity to govern the Russian America from 1850 to 1855).

In 1839, Sitka Lutheran Church, the first Protestant congregation on the west coast of the Americas and the first Lutheran congregation on the entire Pacific Rim was founded in Sitka, Alaska by Finns, and other Lutherans who worked for Russian-American Company. From the start, in 1840-1865, three consecutive Finnish pastors served this pastorate: Uno Cygnaeus (1840-1845), Gabriel Plathán (1845-1852) and Georg Gustaf Winter (1852-1865). The Finns Aaron Sjöstrom and Otto Reinhold Rehn served as the parish organists/sextons during the same period.

In 1841, under the governorship of Russian America by Finnish Arvid Adolf Etholén (1840-1845) (promoted to rear admiral in 1847), the Russian-American area of Fort Ross in Bodega Bay, California, was sold to Johann Sutter. On January 24, 1848, the first California gold was discovered on Sutter's land in Coloma, California, leading to the California Gold Rush, after news of this were spread abroad, mainly by the seamen serving for the Russian-American Company.

In 1850 and 1852, Johan Hampus Furuhjelm sailed to the U.S. West Coast. After he became the Chief Manager of Russian America (1858-1864), he put an end to the hostilities with the natives in Alaska. He also succeeded in abolishing the Alaskan Ice Treaty with San Francisco. According to a contract which had been signed, Russian America had to deliver a certain amount of ice to San Francisco at a fixed price. A problem was caused by the product melting down on the way to the warmer climates. The ice contract became a very awkward deal for the Finnish-Russian colony. Furuhjelm arranged for a new contract to sell ice to San Francisco: 3'000 tons at $25.00 a ton.

The Finnish Chief Managers of Russian America Etholén and Furuhjelm helped pave way for the American Alaska purchase, and the Finnish Sea Captain Gustave Niebaum as the Consul of Russia in San Francisco played a critical role in the final striking of the deal that made Alaska a part of the United States in 1867. As a legacy of their accomplishment, their names can still today be found on the map in several places on the U.S. West Coast. Etolin Island was named after Etholén (a.k.a. Etolin) by the United States in the wake of the Alaska Purchase of 1867. There is also Etolin Strait, as well as a cape, a point and a mountain named after Etholén.

=== Kalevala in San Francisco in 1861 - during the U.S. Civil War ===
During the California Gold Rush and in its aftermath, a substantial Finnish population had settled in San Francisco. In addition to Etholén, Furuhjelm and Niebaum, a number of Finns had become household names in the social circles of San Francisco by the time when the Finnish corvette Kalevala anchored in San Francisco on November 14, 1861. Accordingly, Kalevala's visit in the city received a very warm welcome and created much attention. Kalevala stayed in San Francisco over the Christmas holidays. On Christmas Day, the City of San Francisco presented the officers of Kalevala a Flag of the United States as a present. The day after Boxing Day, a festive dinner party was arranged in honor of the officers of Kalevala at the concert hall of the newly opened Platt's Hall, located at the northeastern corner of Bush and Montgomery Streets. The website of the California State Military Museum provides the following quote, which describes the event:

"A military and civic subscription ball was given at Platt's Hall, on the evening of Friday, December 27, 1861, complimentary to the officers of the Russian steam corvette Calevala, by the citizens of San Francisco, as a token of the public appreciation of the friendly spirit manifested by the Emperor of all the Russia toward our federal government. All arrangements for this ball were confided to the members of the "City Guard" by a committee of the most prominent people. Lieutenant Wm. C. Little was the floor manager, assisted by four non-commissioned officers of the company. Captain Clark, chairman of the reception committee, was assisted by all the other members of the company, every one being in the full fancy uniform of the corps. The "press", in describing the affair, spoke thus of the "City Guard": "One of the most spirited and efficient of our local uniform militia companies, whose proverbial good taste was fully sustained in the admirable manner in which the ball was conducted."

=== Kalevala in San Francisco in 1863-1864 - during the U.S. Civil War ===
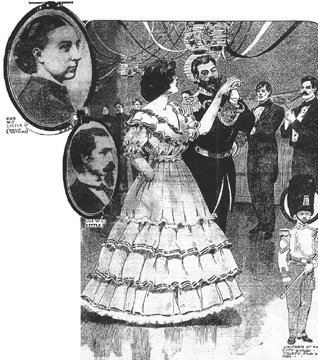
A festive dinner party arranged in honor of Admiral Popoff and the naval officers of the Russian Pacific Fleet visiting San Francisco in 1863.

In 1863, a six-vessel Russian Imperial Navy squadron, a part of the Russian Pacific Fleet, sailed via Vladivostok to the West Coast of the United States, to help defend the waters there against a possible attack by the United Kingdom or France, during the American Civil War (April 12, 1861 – May 10, 1865). In addition to the Finnish-built corvette Kalevala now returning to the U.S. West Coast, this squadron included three other corvettes, Bogatyr, Rynda and Novik (Russian: "Новик"), and two Finnish-built clippers, the sister-ships Abrek (Russian: "Абрек") and Vsadnik (Russian: "Всадник"), both built in the southwestern Finnish town of Pori and launched in 1860. Finnish officers serving in the squadron included Theodor Kristian Avellan, who later became the Minister of Naval Affairs of the Russian Empire (similar role to Great Britain's First Lord of the Admiralty). Among Finnish officers participating in the expedition were also Mr. Enqvist and Mr. Etholén (not Governor Etholén of Russian America).

Commanded by Rear Admiral A. A. Popov, the six vessels anchored in San Francisco starting on October 12, 1863. While the Russian fleet was visiting San Francisco, a large fire burst out in the city, destroying fully a block of buildings between California and Sacramento Streets in downtown San Francisco, in the area today referred to as the Financial District. The fire caused damages worth c. $300'000. 400 sailors of the Russian fleet participated in the firefight, together with the local firefighters. When the firefight was over, lives of six of the sailors had been lost. The San Francisco Fire Department came out of the fight without any casualties. The residents of San Francisco decorated with gold medals the sailors who had been wounded. Special thanks was given e.g. to Lieutenant Etholén (not same as Governor Etholén).

On October 17, 1863, a dinner reception was organized in honor of the 35 officers of the Russian fleet. The San Francisco residents willing to attend the event were charged a $100 attendance fee, which at the time was considered highly expensive. Still 50 years after the event, the local San Francisco newspaper The San Francisco Chronicle marveled the fabulous service of the reception. The squadron departed San Francisco in August, 1864. It returned to Kronstadt at the Baltic Sea in 1865. Kalevala was removed from active service and from the Russian Navy Registry in 1872.

== Russian Baltic Fleet in the U.S. East Coast in 1863-1864 - during the U.S. Civil War ==
Another Russian six-vessel squadron, a part of the Russian Baltic Fleet, arrived in the U.S. East Coast only days before the Pacific Fleet anchored at the U.S. West Coast. The Baltic Fleet arrived in New York City starting on September 24, 1863. The squadron was commanded by Rear Admiral Stepan Lesovski. The occasion gave the Union Army a much needed lift from the very somber mood caused by the Union Army defeat in the great Battle of Chickamauga, fought in September 19–20, 1863, only four days before the arrival of the Russian fleet. The Russian Baltic Fleet stayed in the American waters for seven months, paying side visits to Boston, Minneapolis and Washington D.C.

The two Russian navy expeditions to North America during the U.S. Civil War, one to the West Coast and another to the East Coast, and the Kalevala expedition in 1861-1862 were the only concrete foreign military support received by President Abraham Lincoln and the Union Army during the course of the entire war, fought in 1861-1865. As the navy of the Union was a one ocean navy, concentrated in the Atlantic waters, the help of the Russian Imperial Navy was of critical importance to the Union forces, which had no war ships to defend the U.S. West Coast during the time when there was a great fear of the Confederate naval vessels attacking San Francisco.

== Bibliography ==
- Baedeker, Karl: Russland nebst Teheran, Port Arthur, Peking. In Handbuch Für Reisende. (Leipzig: Karl Baedeker, 1912).
- Benjamin F. Gilbert: Welcome To The Czar's Fleet, An Incident of Civil War Days in San Francisco. The California History magazine, 1948, No. 26. Pages 13–19. San Francisco: The California Historical Society.
- Dorch, Elisabeth, and Dorch, John: Index to Baptisms, Marriages and Deaths in the Archives of the Russian Orthodox Greek Catholic Church in Alaska, 1816-1866. (Washington D.C.: Library of Congress Manuscript Division, 1964).
- Enckell, Maria Jarlsdotter: Documenting the Legacy of the Alaska Finns: from the Russian Period. (S.l.: Finnish- American Historical Society of the West, 1996).
- Gibson, James R.: Imperial Russia in Frontier Alaska: the Changing Geography of Supply and Demand. (New York: Oxford University Press, 1976).
- Gordon Roadarmel (compiled by): Some Dates of 1861. The California History magazine, 1960, No. 39, pages 289–308. San Francisco: The California Historical Society.
- Golovin, Pavel N.: The End of Russian Alaska, Captain P. N. Golovin’s Last Report, 1862. (Portland: Oregon Historical Society, 1979).
- Grand, Johannes G.: Sex År i Sibirien. (Helsingfors: Welin & Göös, 1893).
- Grand, Johannes G.: Siperian Suomalaiset Siirtolaiset ("Finnish Immigrants of Siberia"). FENNIA: Bulletin de la So & de Geographie de Finland no. 22 (1904-1905).
- Ilmonen, Salomon, Samuli: Amerikan Suomalaisten Historia - Vol. 1 ("The History of the Finnish-Americans - Vol. 1"). Publisher: Suomalais-luterilaisten kustannusiiikkeen Kirjapainos. 1919. Hancock, Michigan.
- Khisamutdinov, Amir A.: The Russian Far East: Historical Essays. University of Hawaii. 1993. Honolulu.
- Lamb, Harold: The City and the Tsar: Peter the Great and the Move to the West, 1648-1762. (Garden City: Doubleday (publisher), 1957).
- Lauridsen, Peter: Vitus Bering: the Discoverer of the Bering Strait. (Freeport, New York: Books for Libraries Press, 1969).
- Pierce, Richard A.: Alaska Shipping 1867-1878: Arrivals and Departures at the Port of Sitka. (Kingston, Ontario: Limestone Press, 1972).
- Pierce, Richard A.: Russian-Alaska: a Biographical Dictionary. (Kingston, Ontario: Limestone Press, 1990).
- Pikoff, E.: Landsmän i Ryska Marinen, 1808-1918 - Vol. 14. (Helsinfors: Genealogiska Samfundet i Finland, 1938).
- Stenius, Carl Evert: Handbok för Sjöfarande: Sammanfattade Efter Nyaste In- Och Utrikes Källor. Bo: Frenckeliska Boktryckerier, 1872.
