= William Crichton =

William Crichton may refer to:

- William Crichton, 1st Lord Crichton (died 1454), political figure in the late medieval Kingdom of Scotland
- William Crichton (Jesuit) (c. 1535–1617), Scottish Jesuit
- William Crichton (engineer) (1827–1889), Scottish engineer and shipbuilder in Turku, Grand Duchy of Finland
  - Wm. Crichton & Co., an engineering and shipbuilding company that operated in Turku
- William Crichton, 2nd Earl of Dumfries (1598–1691)
- William Crichton (minister) (1630–1708), Scottish minister, who served as Moderator of the General Assembly in both 1692 and 1697
