= Johan Eberhard von Schantz =

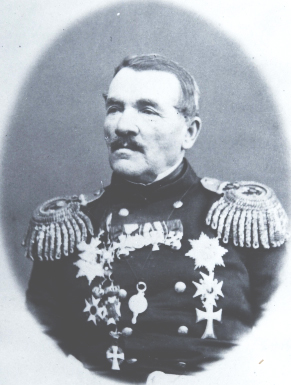
- Born: October 29, 1802; Pori, Sweden (now Finland)
- Died: January 3, 1880 (aged 77); St. Petersburg, Russia
- Military career
- Allegiance: Russian Empire
- Branch: Imperial Russian Navy
- Service years: 1821-1880
- Rank: Admiral
- Conflicts: Russo-Turkish War; Crimean War
- Other work: Member of the Board of Admiralty

Johan Eberhard von Schantz (Russian: Иван Иванович фон Шанц; 29 October 1802 – 3 January 1880) was a Finnish-born admiral in the Russian Imperial Navy, ship designer and explorer.

== Life ==
Schantz was born in the Western Finnish coastal town of Pori, which at the time was a part of Sweden, the son of the lieutenant general Johan Eberhard von Schantz and Johanna Sofia Didron. Through his father, Schantz was a member of the noble Schantz family, which had its roots in western Germany. In 1814 he enlisted the Russian merchant navy and later took chief mate classes in Vyborg. Schantz served 1821–1828 as a midshipman in the 26th naval equipage of the Baltic Fleet, 1828–1830 as a lieutenant in the 8th naval equipage, 1830–1832 in the 27th naval equipage and 1832 in the 5th naval equipage. During the Russo-Turkish War (1828–29), Schantz served in the ship of the line Fère Champenoise which took part of the blockade of the Dardanelles. In 1833–1838, he was the adjutant of the admiral Alexander Sergeyevich Menshikov.

In 1834–1836, Schantz circumnavigated the globe as the commander of the Russian Imperial Navy ship America. In 1835 he rediscovered the Wotho Atoll, originally discovered by the Spanish expedition of Ruy López de Villalobos in the 1540s. The atoll was later also known as the Schantz Islands.

In 1841, Schantz sailed the frigate Kamchatka from New York City to Kronstadt and commanded the ship until 1847. He was promoted to counter admiral in 1848. In the 1850s Schantz designed several gunboats built in the Finnish docks of Pori, Turku and Helsinki. He also designed the frigate Rurik (1851) and the corvette Kalevala (1858), both built at the Turku Old Shipyard. During the Crimean War, Schantz served in the Baltic Fleet. He was promoted to vice admiral in 1855 and admiral in 1866. Schantz was a member of the Russian Board of Admiralty from February 1863 to his death.

Schantz published his Swedish language memoirs under the pen name En gammal sjöman (An Old Sailor) in 1870–1871.

== Decorations ==
- 1846: Order of St Vladimir 3rd degree
- 1847: Order of St. George 4th degree
- 1854: Order of Saint Stanislaus 1st degree
- 1858: Order of St. Anne 1st degree
- 1864: Order of St Vladimir 2nd degree
- 1868: Order of the White Eagle
- 1871: Order of St. Alexander Nevsky
- 1876: Order of St. Alexander Nevsky, with diamonds

== Bibliography ==
- Mitt första steg på sjömannabanan, G. W. Wilén & Co, Turku, 1870.
- Mina första steg på örlogsmannabanan, G. W. Wilén & Co, Turku, 1871.

== Sources ==
- von Schantz, Johan Eberhard Finnish Literature Society (in Finnish)
