= Erik Julin =

Finnish businessperson (1796–1874)

Commercial Counsellor Erik Julin
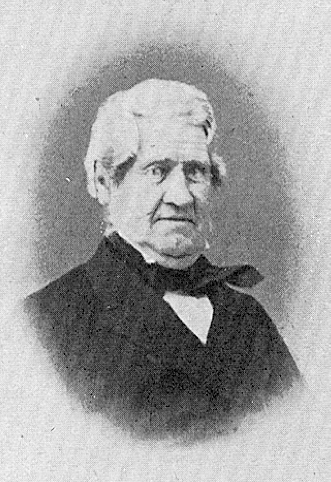
- Born: 13 November 1796; Oulu, Sweden
- Died: 21 June 1874 (aged 77); Turku, Grand Duchy of Finland
- Monuments: bust in Turku (Walter Runeberg)
- Education: apothecary
- Board member of: Åbo Skeppswarf (1838→); Finnish Marine Insurance Association (1859→)
- Spouse: Christina Sofia née Sundbäck
- Children: Erik Julin Jr. (1825–1857)
- Parent(s): Johan Julin and Albertina née Karberg
- Relatives: John von Julin (brother); Albert von Julin (nephew)

Erik Julin (13 November 1796 – 21 June 1874) was a Finnish apothecary, shipowner and industrialist.

After his studies Julin continued his father's pharmacy in Turku. He started a shipping business which first operated locally and later overseas. Julin was founding owner of Russo-Finnish Whaling Company and significant owner of Turku shipbuilders Åbo Skeppswarf and W:m Crichton & C:o.

Julin initiated foundation of the first voluntary fire brigade of Finland and he developed actively the financial sector.

== Early years and studies ==
Julin was born in Oulu, Ostrobothnia. His parents were apothecary Johan Julin and Albertina née Karberg. Erik Julin continued his father's profession; he studied in Turku Cathedral School in 1810–1813 and after this in Imperial Academy of Turku. He spent academic year 1815–1816 at the Imperial University of Dorpat. Like his older brother Johan Jakob, he decided to follow his father's steps in pharmaceutical field. Julin did his internship in his father's pharmacy and also in Stockholm. During 1819–1820 Julin studied in professor Johann Trommsdorff's pharmaceutical institute in Erfurt, Prussia where he also learnt analysing minerals. Julin graduated Master of Pharmacy in 1820.

== Business areas ==
=== Pharmacy ===
After death of his father, Erik Julin gradually took over his pharmacy in Turku in 1820–1826. A major setback took place in the following year, when the pharmacy building was destroyed in the Great Fire of Turku. In 1830 Julin became the sole owner of his father's cinchona mill which is regarded the oldest pharmaceutical factory of Finland. Julin managed large-scale herbal medicine trading between Finland and Central Europe.

Julin gave the apothecary business to his son, Erik Julin junior, in 1852. He died already five years later, after which Julin took back the business but sold it one year after.

=== Shipping ===
Julin started shipping business in 1825 when he initiated founding a company for transport from Ostrobothnia. Bolaget för Österbottniska Kustfarten operated between Turku and Ostrobothnian harbours for five years. In 1827 Julin founded shipping company E. Julin & C. which during years 1827–1856 possessed seven merchant ships. The company most likely had partial ownership for some other vessels. The company owned merchant ship Arthur which was among the first Turku freight ships which operated to Australia. Julin's business partner was Joel Falcken in 1840–1852 and in 1844 the company was one of the largest taxpayers of Turku.

Julin owned many sailing ships but promoted using of steamships. In 1836 he became shareholder in steam shipping company which operated between Turku and Saint Petersburg. Since 1849 the company name was Åbo nya ångfartygsbolag. He was co-founder and major shareholder in 1856 founded Aura shipping company and 1857 started Österbottniska Ångfartygs Ab.

=== Shipbuilding ===
In 1838 Julin became board member in Åbo Gamla Skeppswarf, Turku old shipyard. He was one of the company managers in 1842–1846 until he was replaced by his old business partner Joel Falcken. Julin had a key role in promoting investments at the yard and made deals of ships delivered to the Russian-American Company. Julin gained a strong foothold in the Turku shipbuilding industry after together with his business partner William Crichton he took over engineering company Cowie & Eriksson. In 1862 the company was renamed W:m Crichton & C:o.

=== Whaling ===
The Russian-American Company grew strongly in the 1840s and 1850s and needed new ships. By help of the Finnish-born Alaskan politicians Arvid Adolf Etholén and Johan Hampus Furuhjelm, the Finnish shipyards, sailors, whale hunters and shipowners got new business opportunities. Many of the company's new ships were built at Turku old shipyard in the late 1830s and early 1840s. Julin founded a shipping company that worked under assignment of the Russian-American Company. The company planned starting whaling in Alaskan waters, but after long negotiations, in 1851 Julin had his will of founding Russo-Finnish Whaling Company which was owned half by the Russian-American Company and half by Turku businessmen. The head office was situated in Turku and Julin became its manager. The company had five whalers which were the first of their kind to sail under the Russian flag. The business suffered from the Crimean War. The whaling company was discontinued in 1860.

=== Other ===
While Julin's business was focused on apothecary operations and shipping, he also owned a water mill in Halinen rapids and two small factories, of which one produced soap and candles, and the other one sailcloth.

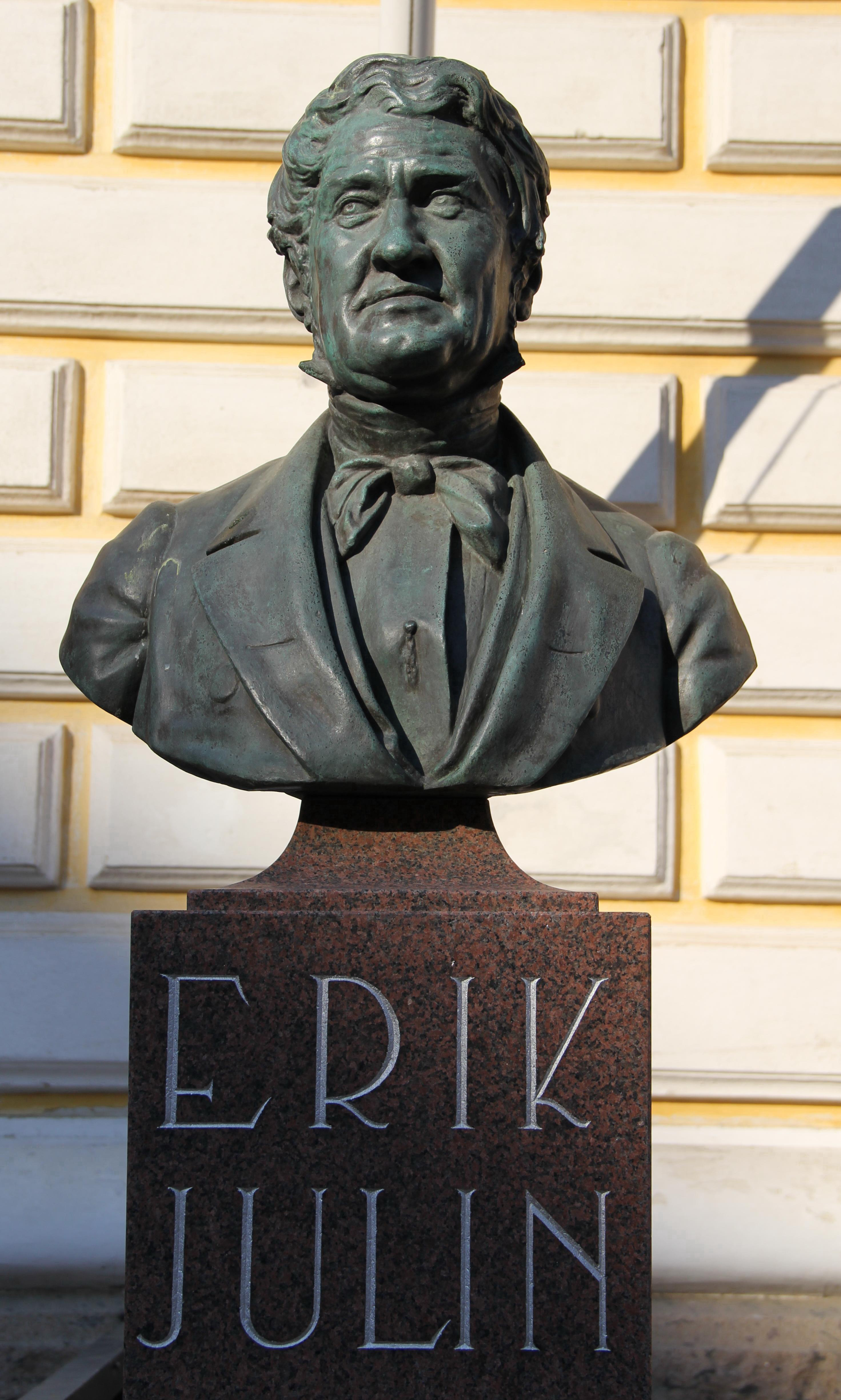
Bust of Erik Julin in Turku.

== Contributions in social development ==
Julin was interested in developing agriculture; his main interest were horse and fruit breeding and apiculture. In 1856–1858 he was the Deputy Chairman of the Finnish Household Society.

In 1849 Julin initiated founding of the Finnish Marine Insurance Association. He also suggested starting a similar association for freight and goods, and for peasants' ships. In 1856 Julin was set into a committee that was planning economical reforms in Finland. He strove getting a railway connection between Helsinki and Turku, and belonged to group of businessmen who would have built the railway with private funding in case the construction would not have been paid from public funds. Julin worked actively to develop banking operations and he became the local agent of Suomen Yhdyspankki in Turku in 1862.

When Turku was rebuilt after the great fire Julin made many suggestions to develop the cityscape. Façade of his house, designed by Pehr Johan Gylich, still exists. He took part in founding the first voluntary fire brigade of Finland in Turku. Julin was one of the organisers of nursing education during Crimean War. In 1858 he was the driving force in fundraising and distribution of aid for Finnish War veterans.

== Family ==
Julin married Christina Sofia née Sundbäck in 1822. Their son was at young age deceased Erik Julin Jr. (1825–1857).
