= M Crichton & C:o =

Finnish manufacturing company

W:m Crichton & C:o Ab
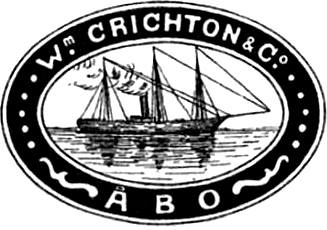
- Formerly: Cowie & Eriksson (1842–1857); D. Cowie & C:o (1857–1862)
- Company type: Osakeyhtiö (1874 →)
- Industry: Engineering; shipbuilding
- Founded: 1842
- Founders: David Cowie; Anders Thalus Eriksson
- Defunct: 24 April 1913
- Fate: Bankruptcy
- Successor: Ab Crichton
- Headquarters: Turku, Grand Duchy of Finland
- Number of locations: 2 (1896 →)
- Products: Steam engines, ships and other engineering products
- Owners: David Cowie (1842–1862); Anders Thalus Eriksson (1842–1857); Erik Julin (1857–1874); William Crichton (1862–1889); other investors
- Subsidiaries: W:m Crichton & C:o Okhta Shipyard (1896→)

W:m Crichton & C:o Ab is a former engineering and shipbuilding company that operated in Turku, Grand Duchy of Finland from 1842 to 1913. The company also had another shipyard in Okhta, Saint Petersburg.

The company was founded as Cowie & Eriksson. At the beginning it produced steam engines, boilers and other engineering products. William Crichton became owner in 1862 and the company was named W:m Crichton & C:o The first shipbuilding slipway was constructed in 1864. The company became the biggest employer of Turku after acquiring the nearby yard Åbo Skeppswarf in 1883.

Crichton died in 1889, after which the operations were continued by investors. In 1896 the company started a new yard in Okhta, Saint Petersburg, to build ships for the local market. The operations were poorly organised, and both yards lost so much money that the entire company went bankrupt in 1913.

A new company, Ab Crichton, was established in 1914 to continue shipbuilding in Turku.

== Name typography and spelling ==
The contemporary sources use alternative spellings W^{m} Crichton & C^{o}, W:m Crichton & C:o and W:m Crichton & Co. for which the corresponding Russian transliteration was В:мъ Крейтонъ и Ко. ("V:m Kreiton i Ko.").

== Origins ==
The company was started in 1842, when Swedish chief engineer Anders Thalus Eriksson and Scottish David Cowie got a permit to start a foundry and engineering works in Turku. The men had worked before in Stockholm for Samuel Owen who had built the first steam engines of Sweden. The location for the premises was selected an empty lot on east bank of river Aura, in address Itäinen Rantakatu 56–58. The start was funded by a loan of 15,000 silver rubles given by the senate. The operations started in 1844 and the portfolio consisted of steam engines and other machinery. In 1844 the company employed 86 people. While starting an engineering company from scratch included a high risk, there was need for steam engines in industrialising Finland. The products were steam engines and various castings and forgings, and the main customer became the Turku Old Shipyard located at the other side of the river.

== First steam engines ==
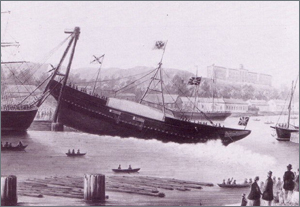
Launch of the Imperial Russian steam frigate Rurik at Turku Old Shipyard

The first known large Turku-built ship propelled by Cowie & Eriksson engine was the 1850 built Furst Menschikoff II.

Cowie & Eriksson got an order for an engine to power steam frigate Rurik, which was the largest ship built in Finland until then. In 1850 the company hired Scottish engineer William Crichton to accomplish installation and commissioning of the 300-hp engine; the project took three years in total. The ship was launched at the Turku Old Shipyard in 1851 and handed over in 1853, after which Crichton left the company.

The company suffered of lack of orders during the Crimean War. Eriksson decided to give up the business and sold his share of the company to local investor Erik Julin in 1857. After this the company operated under name D. Cowie & C:o. Julin started to seek for a partner who had experience about marine industry and business knowledge. He wrote a letter to William Crichton, who lived then in Kolpino, close to Saint Petersburg, and suggested him to buy Cowie's share of the company. Crichton took the offer and moved in Turku in 1862, after which the company was named W:m Crichton & C:o. Crichton was up to date about the latest development of naval engineering: propellers were replacing paddle wheels, wood gave way to steel and compound technology was entering in steam engines; this was enabled by the recently invented fire-tube boilers which withstood higher pressure.

== Start of shipbuilding ==
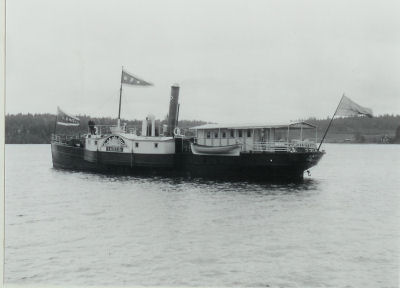
S/S Lahtis in the 1890s

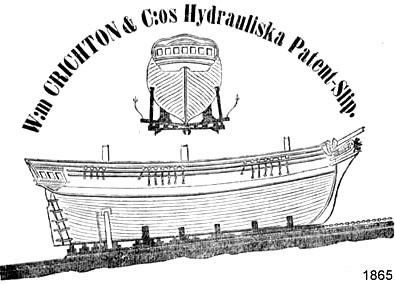
Picture of Crichton's hydraulic patent slip from 1865

Crichton wanted to extend the company portfolio to complete vessels. The company's first ships were not built in Turku but delivered in parts to Vähä-Äiniö yard at lake Päijänne, 230 km away from Turku. The ships were paddle steamers built by local craftsmen under supervision of specialists sent by Crichton. The first one, named Ensimmäinen ("first") was powered by a small, 12-hp engine and handed over in 1863. The subsequent Toinen ("second") was delivered in the following year and had a 25-hp engine. Both ships were intended for log tugging. Three more ships were built at Vähä-Äiniö yard: passenger ships Seura, which was a 28.8 metres long, and 33.7-metre Lahtis were both paddle steamers and handed over in 1864. In 1866 the Imperial Russian Army ordered Knyas Aleksei, a propeller equipped ship for Päijänne transportation.

In the meantime, a new slipway was taken into use in Turku in 1864; it could be applied both on newbuilding and repairs. A mast crane was built to lift engines and boilers into hulls and to unload steel sheets from barges. The first ships built on the new slipway were a tugboat and a couple of barges delivered to a Saint Petersburg customer in about 1865. It is likely that also few other vessels were built before 1867, when steam cruiser Suomi was built, but the original order documents have not survived.

Crichton built and installed small auxiliary steam engines on sailing ships in 1864–1873. The stern was modified to allow fitting of boiler, engine and propeller. The complete number of conversion projects remains unknown but the existing documents mention few barques and schooners with 30–40-hp engines. The concept was unsuccessful and in many cases the engines were removed after.

In 1868 Crichton delivered for Russian steam frigate Knyas Pozyarsk, a 35-feet longboat powered by a 5-hp steam engine. The boat type became one of the company's specialties; by 1905 Crichton had delivered at least 50 longboats. The hull was typically composite construction with steel ribs and wooden planking, sometimes completely made from steel. Engine output was generally under 10 hp, the most powerful one being 68 hp.

== Growth ==
The 1867 Suomi, delivered to the Finnish Customs, was Crichton's largest ship produced by then. It was 110' 6" long, 18' wide, the draught was 7' and displacement 107 tonnes. The engine output was 320 ihp. Although most of the subsequent orders consisted of relatively small vessels, such as longboats, tug boats and small sailboats, Crichton predicted that demand for larger ships would grow and he wanted to follow the trend. Despite the famine years in the 1860s, the yard sales grew steadily. In about 1870 Crichton bought more land from Itäinen Rantakatu 60–62 and built a larger, in particular wider slipway diagonally next to the river.

In March 1872 W:m Crichton & C:o received the largest order until then. The customer was Ångfartygsaktiebolaget Åbo, which ordered a passenger and freight ship for the Stockholm – Turku – Helsinki – Saint Petersburg route. The draught of the ship was 437 tonnes and the price was 200,000 marks. The delivery was scheduled for spring 1873. Although the size of the ship did not cause problems, the short lead time did – the ship, named Åbo ("Turku"), was launched at the end of May 1873 and it was ready for sea trial only at the end of September. The interior outfitting work was outsourced to the Turku Old Shipyard. Although Crichton presumably paid high penalties for the delay, the customer was satisfied with the result and the performance of the 100-hp compound engine which provided maximum cruise speed of 10 knots. In 1875 Turun Höyrylaiva Oy ordered a passenger steamer. Its size was 175×26×10 feet and net tonnage 357. Her 125-hp compound engine gave a maximum speed of 11 knots. S/S Finland was handed over in June 1876, now in due time.

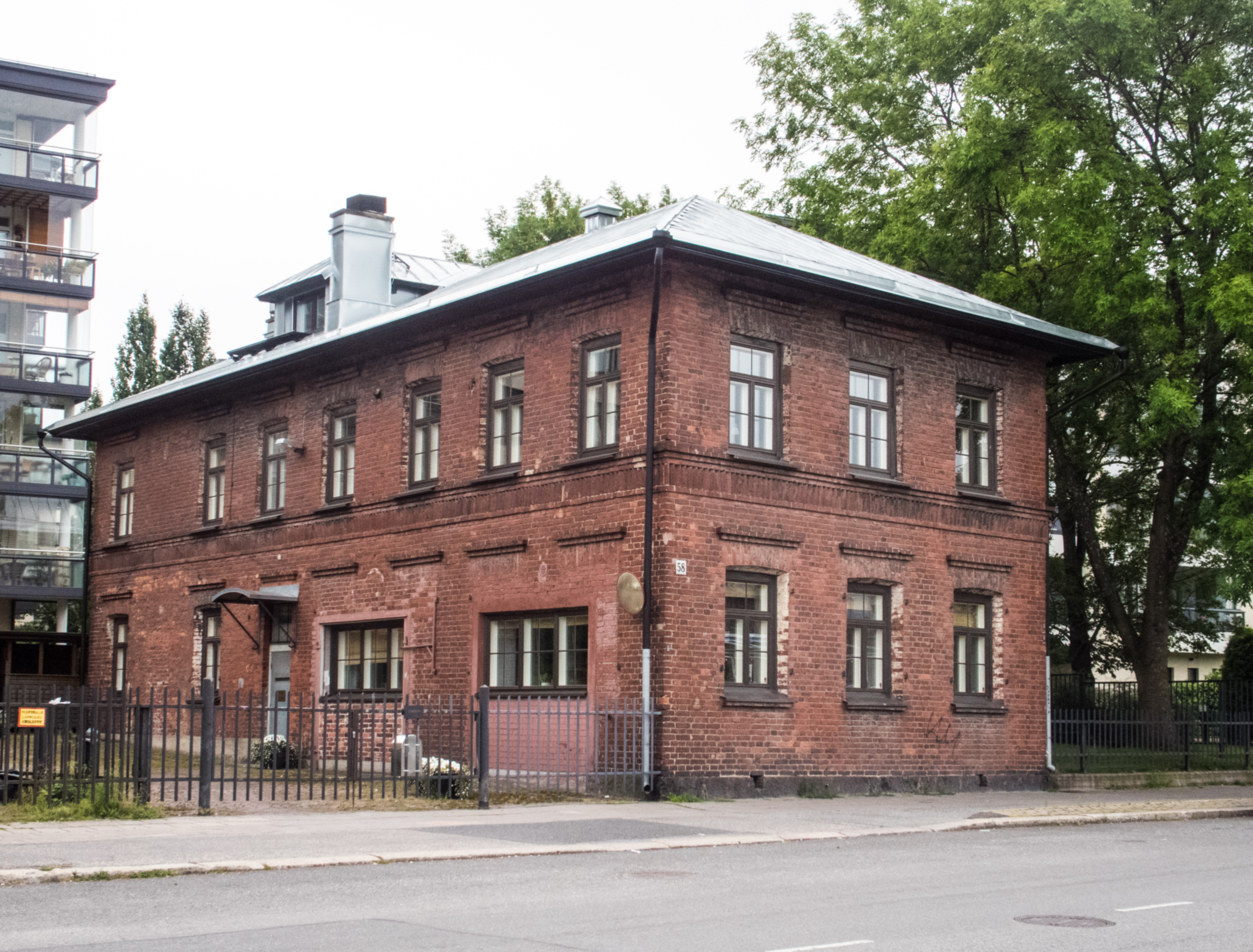
Shipyard office built in 1873

In the early 1870s W:m Crichton & C:o employed 400 people. Most of the sales came from steam engines and other machinery, and just 30% of turnover came from ships. The company produced most of the needed tools, even drilling and turning machines, in its own workshops. Rapid growth of the company and the large orders required investments and various financial arrangements, creating large risks to its owners. At about the same time with making quotation for S/S Finland in 1874, the owners converted W:m Crichton & C:o a limited company in order to assure their personal property. The capital was 1,500,000 marks which was divided into 30 shares, each of 50,000 marks value; 20 shares were owned by William Crichton and 10 shares by trading house Julin. Erik Julin died already in the same year, after which the trading house was led by his son John Julin.

Due to the growing demand of larger ships Crichton became interested at the Turku Old Shipyard company located at the opposite side of river Aura. The yard had capacity for building large hulls. During the 1870s William Crichton grew his ownership in the Turku Old Shipyard and by the end of the decade he became majority shareholder and was appointed head of the company in 1878. Straight after this Crichton started investments at the old yard to enable building of large steel hulls; a workshop was built for bending steel ribs and after few years there were sheet steel forming and riveting facilities. When Crichton received two large orders with two steel ships in each in 1881, the hull production of Solovetski, Murmanski, Zurukan and Spasiteliy was subcontracted from the Old Shipyard. During that year Crichton handed over total 12 vessels, including customs boat Wiikinki, paddle steamer Krasnovodsk and six smaller vessels. Crichton became sole owner in 1883 and merged the yard to his own company. Subsequently, W:m Crichton & C:o became by far the largest company of Turku; the headcount was 936 and turnover 1,589,000 marks.

In 1879 Englishman John Eager became the company head designer. He was specialised on fast boats and designed a number of new vessel types, such as torpedo boats, gunboats and tanker ships.

When the Imperial Russian Navy started an extensive investment programme 1881, which included substantial extension of the Pacific fleet, the company received many beneficial orders. Crichton and Eager had created good contacts with the Russian authorities who decided about state purchases. The company gained good reputation in Moscow industrial fair in 1882, when W:m Crichton & C:o won a significant award, the Empire Seal. Despite the positive reputation, getting orders from the state required a complex process, including formal and informal negotiations, official and unofficial money transfers. The company had a dedicated contact person in Saint Petersburg, commercial councellor F.W. Martinson, who handled the negotiations with the Russian officials.

In 1882 Crichton received orders for four tankers. 980-tonne Lastoska was powered by a 380-hp engine and delivered to an Astrakhan based customer. 670-tonne sisters Obiyt, Armenia and Atmosfer featured 80-hp engines and had length of 152' and width of 23'. The customer was Naphta Transport Company in Baku. It is possible that the ships were built by using drawings from Swedish Motala Works, which had built the world's first tanker ship just a few years earlier.

Years 1881–1882 were the record-breaking years for Crichton; the good order level reached until 1887. During these years W:m Crichton & C:o got 113 orders. Most of the vessels were smaller, such as longboats, small motorboats and sailing boats. Only three ships were large, over 1,000 tonnes in size. Notable passenger ships built in the 1880s were the 1887 delivered 345-tonne Ebba Munck and 1888 delivered 183-tonne Heben.

The premises were extended again in 1887, when two large sheds with slipways were built on the west bank.

== John Eager's era ==
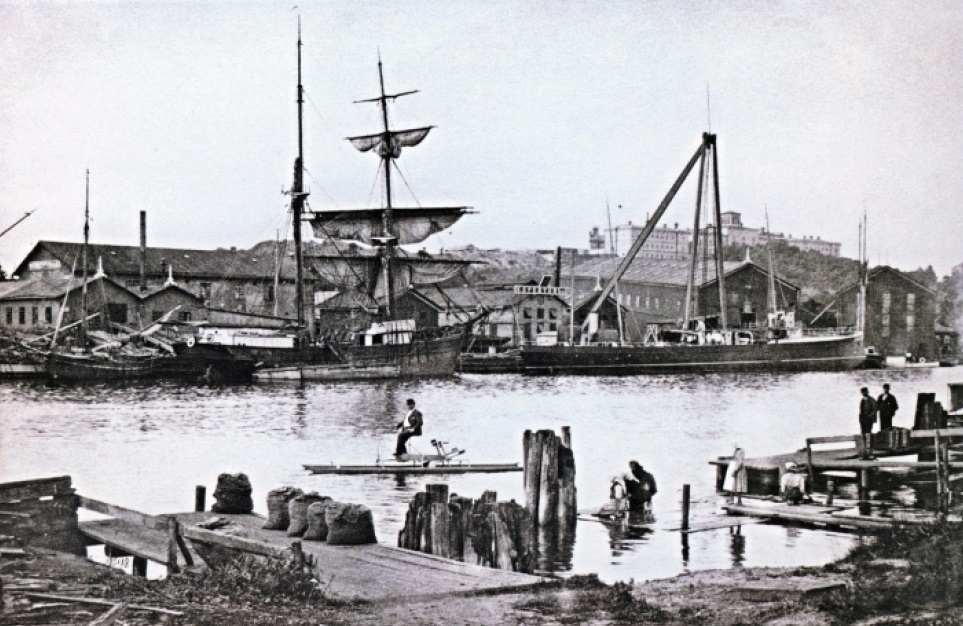
View on the west side of the yard in early summer 1897

=== Changes in ownership ===
The company faced a major loss in April 1889 when William Crichton died just at the age of 62 years. John Eager took his post as company manager. None of Crichton's 12 children wanted to take the business. Shortly after four shares were sold to Eager, one to the major funding bank Nordiska Aktiebanken för Handel och Industrie. In the 1890s 13 of the remaining 15 shares were sold. Count Anatol Orloff-Davidoff from Saint Petersburg bought 12 shares and another nobleman from the same city, Ludwig von Havemann, bought one share. Supposedly, the Russia-based owners contributed the rapid growth of the company after the mid-1890s, but speculatively they also initiated the disastrous decision of starting operations in Saint Petersburg.

Trading house John Julin held ten shares; after death of John Julin the shares went to his two daughters, who were married to prosperous brothers Ernst and Magnus Dahlström. In 1898 the shares were transferred to trading house C. M. Dahlström and both brothers represented five shares each.

Count Orloff-Davidoff gave his shares to his sons Alexander and Alexei in 1906. Other new owners then were Russian German businessman Alfred Meiser and colonel Karl Björksten.

=== Ships for the imperial family ===
W:m Crichton & C:o won again the Empire Seal in industrial fair in Nizhny Novgorod in 1896; it also had an own exhibition stand with range of small steam engines in Paris World Expo in year 1900. The company won one gold medal but never managed to sell products to Central and Western Europe.

Grand duke Alexander Mikhailovich ordered a yacht from W:m Crichton & C:o in 1895. The 1897 built over 1,000-tonne steam yacht Tamara was the most luxurious ship built by Crichton. No records about the interior have survived but it was most likely ordered from Saint Petersburg. The length of the ship was 79.2 metres and the two 600-hp triple expansion steam engines provided maximum speed of 14 knots.

Another notable vessel delivered in 1897 was not significant in size, but the customer and structure makes it noteworthy. It was small steamship Peterhof, ordered by the Russian czar Nikolai II, who used it for travelling between the capital and Peterhof Palace. The ship was almost entirely built from brass alloy called delta metal, anti-magnetic material, which would not activate potential naval mines set by terrorists. The structures on the deck were decorated by gold plated mouldings. The ship was 61' long, 10.5* wide and its draught was 5'2". The 185-hp steam engine gave speed of 13 knots.

In 1903 the company delivered two steam cruisers, Kondor and Berkut, to the Russian Customs. Both of them had 900-hp engines and maximum speed of 14.5 knots.

The last luxurious vessel built by W:m Crichton & C:o was the 1905 delivered steam yacht Neva, which was built to the Navy Minister Aleksei Birilev. The ship was exceptionally paddle steamer. The engines generated output of 1,100 horsepower which gave her maximum speed of 15 knots, which is high for a such type of vessel.

At the turn of the century the company was still healthy, although delays in payments from Russia caused occasional shortages in cash reserves. During those years the company could not pay dividend. Due to unprofitable deals the company made loss by 153,000 marks in 1904 and 335,000 marks in 1905 although the yard was fully employed. The steam yacht Neva had been sold for 1,068,000 marks with a small profit, but eventually the project caused loss of 226,655 marks; the last part of the payment came from the customer as late as in 1909.

John Eager retired in summer 1906 and the new manager became Karl Björksten.

=== Okhta shipyard ===
In 1896 W:m Crichton & C:o leased premises in Okhta, Saint Petersburg, for building vessels and their engines for the Russian Admiralty. In the agreement the company committed to invest on the buildings and machinery, but despite large sums spent on the facilities, a single steam engine was never built. Since the very beginning operations were poorly organised; schedules were not kept and raw materials were used wastefully. Until 1907 the losses at Okhta were caused by penalty payments and investments but after that some bad deals made earlier started to cause massive losses, most significant ones being four Kaiman-class submarine hulls, two minelayers and two icebreakers. In 1907 Björksten demanded that the technical management at Okhta yard must be changed. This happened in 1908. In 1909 the situation looked still hopeful, but the interest charges caused by the earlier losses made the situation unbearable.

== Navy vessels ==
W:m Crichton & C:o produced its first torpedo boats for the Imperial Russian Navy in 1877–1878. These early models were small and featured steel hull and one or two torpedo launchers. The engines were 220-hp high pressure steam engines. The drawings for the boats were made by Admiralty Technical Department. Most of the boats were produced at Saint Petersburg yards. Crichton produced six units from the total 100 boats ordered by the Baltic Fleet.

In 1885 W:m Crichton & C:o produced its largest vessel by then, gunboat Bobr ("Beaver") with displacement of 1,187 tonnes. She featured two engines with total output of 1,140 hp, which gave her maximum speed of 11 knots. The vessel was heavily armed; two 9" cannons on the bow and a 6" cannon on the stern and additional smaller six 42-mm and four 37-mm guns. The gunboat served in the Russian Pacific fleet until it sank due to Japanese fire in Port Arthur bombing in 1904.

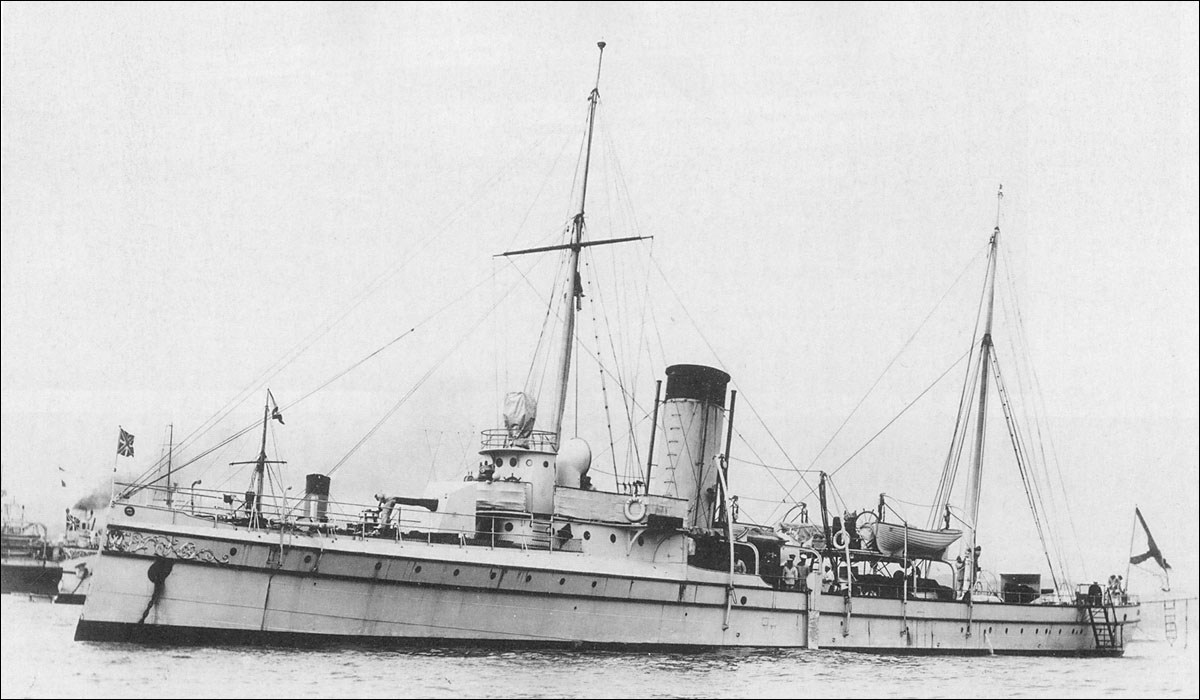
Imperial Russian mine cruiser Abrek

The Imperial Russian Navy kept modernising its fleet; in 1887 Crichton received and order for eight new generation torpedo boats. Four of them, Borgo, Ekenes, Kotka and Dagö had engine power of 1,000 hp. The four bigger ones Gogland, Nargen, Polanger and Pakerort had two engines, each of them with 1,000 hp output. The maximum speed was between 18 and 21 knots.

In 1893 two torpedo cruisers Vsadnik and Gajdamak were launched. The armour consisted of six 47-mm and three 37-mm guns and one torpedo launcher placed on the deck. The 3,300-hp engine output gave maximum speed of 21 knots. Both ships sunk in Port Arthur in December 1904 but Japanese lifted and repaired them, after which they served in the Imperial Japanese Navy until 1914.

An even bigger torpedo cruiser, 500-tonne torpedo cruiser Abrek was handed over in 1897. The value of the order was 1,340,000 marks. The 4,500 hp engine power enable maximum speed of 21 knots. Abrek featured two 75-mm and 47-mm guns and two torpedo launchers placed on the deck. The ship grounded at the front of Tallinn in 1906 and was removed from craft due to the damages.

In 1898 new Sokol type of torpedo boats, Kretyet and Korsyun, were launched. They were based on drawings made by Scottish Yarrow & Co after assignment of the Russian Navy. The total number of the boats was 26 and all the others were built at yards in Saint Petersburg area. Two high-power steam engines gave output of total 3,800 hp and maximum speed of 28 knots; there were two torpedo launchers and four guns size between 47 mm and 75 mm.

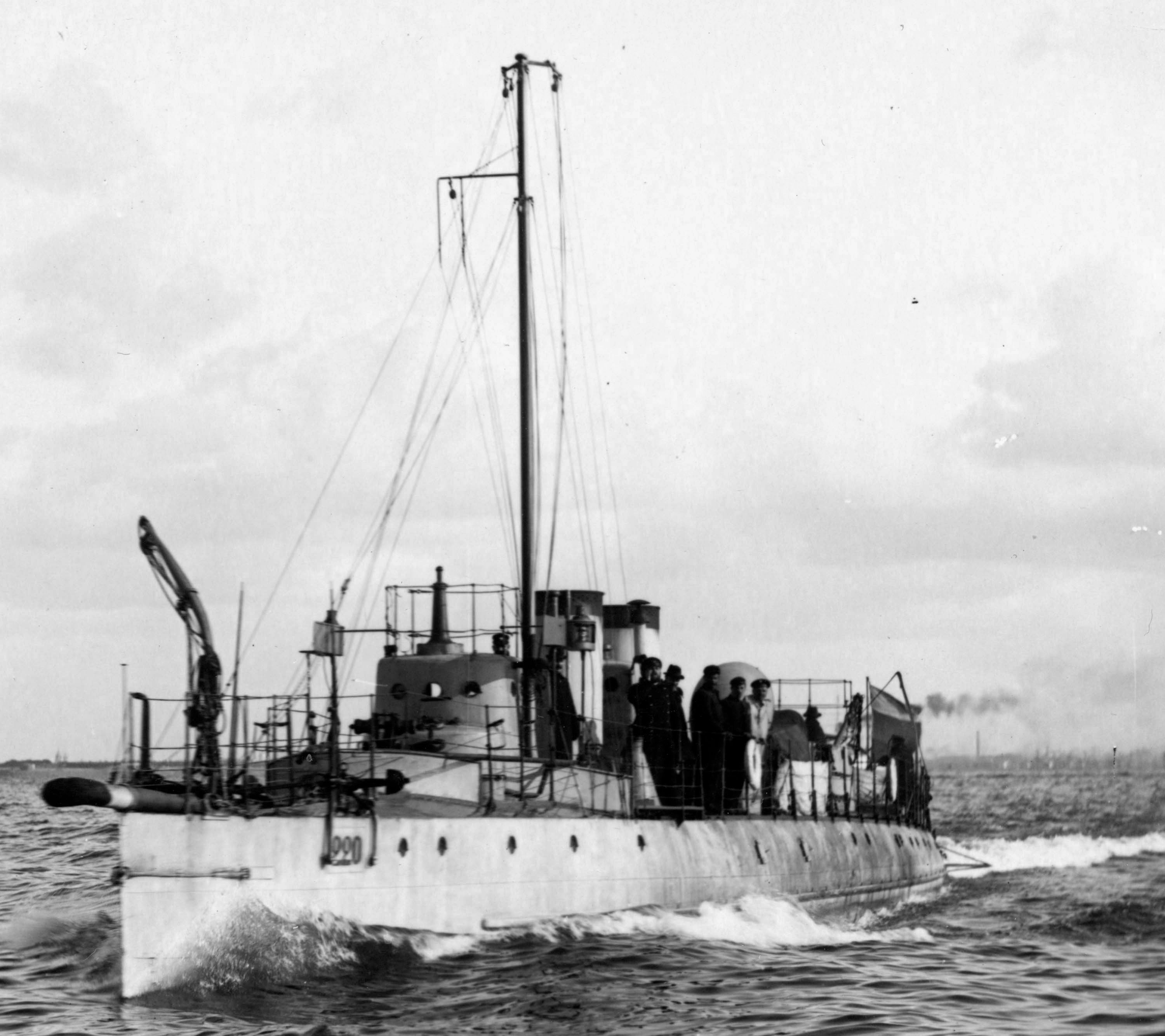
Imperial Russian torpedo boat N:o 220 built in 1904

The Russian Navy ordered two Cyklon type torpedo boats which were designed by French Normándie shipyard. The engine output was the same 3,800 hp as in Sokol type but due to lighter structure and smaller fuel capacity they reached 29 knots' maximum speed. The ships were handed over in 1904.

After suffering heavy losses in the Russo-Japanese War, the Russian Navy placed orders for new craft: total 16 units of 650-tonne torpedo destroyers with engine power of 7,300 hp were ordered from various yards, two of them from W:m Crichton & C:o. The 75-metre vessels were designed by Stettiner Vulkan in Germany and featured two 100-mm and on 37-mm guns, four machine guns and three torpedo launchers for 450-mm torpedoes. The top speed of Ochotnik and Pogranityniy reached 25 knots. The vessels were handed over in 1906 and the deal of total 4,340,352 marks was the biggest the yard ever got. These were the last torpedo boats ever built in Turku. The orders of the Russian Navy ceased in 1906 due to political tensions between the Empire and Grand Duchy.

== Combustion engines ==
The decision of starting combustion engine production originated most likely from Karl Björksten. As the company did not have the needed expertise, Björksten bought production licence for an engine type developed by Swedish engineer H.A. Bertheau. The first series of ten units was produced in 1906 and delivered to Okhta shipyard, to be mounted on cutters built there. The engine construction turned out to be technically failed; the engine problems delayed the handover and the company had to pay significant penalties. By 1907 total 24 engines were produced, of which 16 in Turku and 8 in Okhta, when the project was filed.

In 1909 W:m Crichton & C:o started producing Loke engines, which were possibly also of Swedish design. The first two units were built in Okhta and installed to power a generator of a lightvessel. Total 73 units were produced until 1912; 16 in Turku and 57 in Okhta.

Crichton's engines lost in properties to its neighbour and main competitor, Vulcan. Also another nearby company, Andrée & Rosenqvist, started engine production in 1912 and became successful in the field. Both of these companies had designed their own engines and had a lot of knowledge about engine production, but Crichton had chosen to work with bought drawings without understanding about the product.

== 1906–1913: decline and bankruptcy ==
Unprofitable deals, such as steam yacht Neva built in Turku in 1904 and four submarine hulls built in Okhta and handed over in 1905 caused massive losses to W:m Crichton & C:o. The failed combustion engines caused delays and warranty costs. Moreover, operations had relied on prepayments of new orders and therefore decline of order intake in 1906 led quickly to cash shortage. Ship order intake dropped drastically in 1906 leading to dismissal of hundreds of employees at the Turku yard. By spring 1907 the company was in a serious crisis. In addition to cash shortage the company's machinery and facilities were in poor shape and old fashioned, causing low productivity. The facilities required immediate investments, for which the company had no funds.

While steam engine production was still profitable and they were produced for the ships built at Okhta yard and sold also for some other yards in Saint Petersburg, only few boilers were built due to old and shattered boiler shop in Turku. Therefore, most of the Okhta built ships featured locally built boilers. All the engines were compound type with output range of 80–120 ihp, featuring 9" and 17" bores and 10" long stroke, or 9½" and 19" bores with stroke of 12".

In 1908 W:m Crichton & C:o made loss by nearly 1.4 million marks and the outstanding debt reached 3.7 million marks. The main creditors were banks, Orloff-Davidoff brothers and C. M. Dahlström company. The share capital was doubled from 1.5 million marks to 3 million in 1909, and in 1910–1911 the losses dropped to 290,000 marks. In the meantime the sales still declined and debt increased: at the end of 1911 the company was loaded with total 8.4 million marks' debt burden. Despite these efforts, W:m Crichton & C:o eventually filed for bankruptcy on 24 April 1913.

== Re-establishment ==
Okhta yard was closed and the moveables were sold in the following year. C. M. Dahlström company held claims of over 4.5 million marks to the bankrupt estate. The Dahlström brothers took immediate actions to restart the operations in Turku, in order to secure their property. Therefore, only such property was sold that was not necessary for production. New company, Aktiebolaget Crichton, was founded in June 1914 under leadership of the Dahlström brothers.

== Some of the longest-time served vessels ==
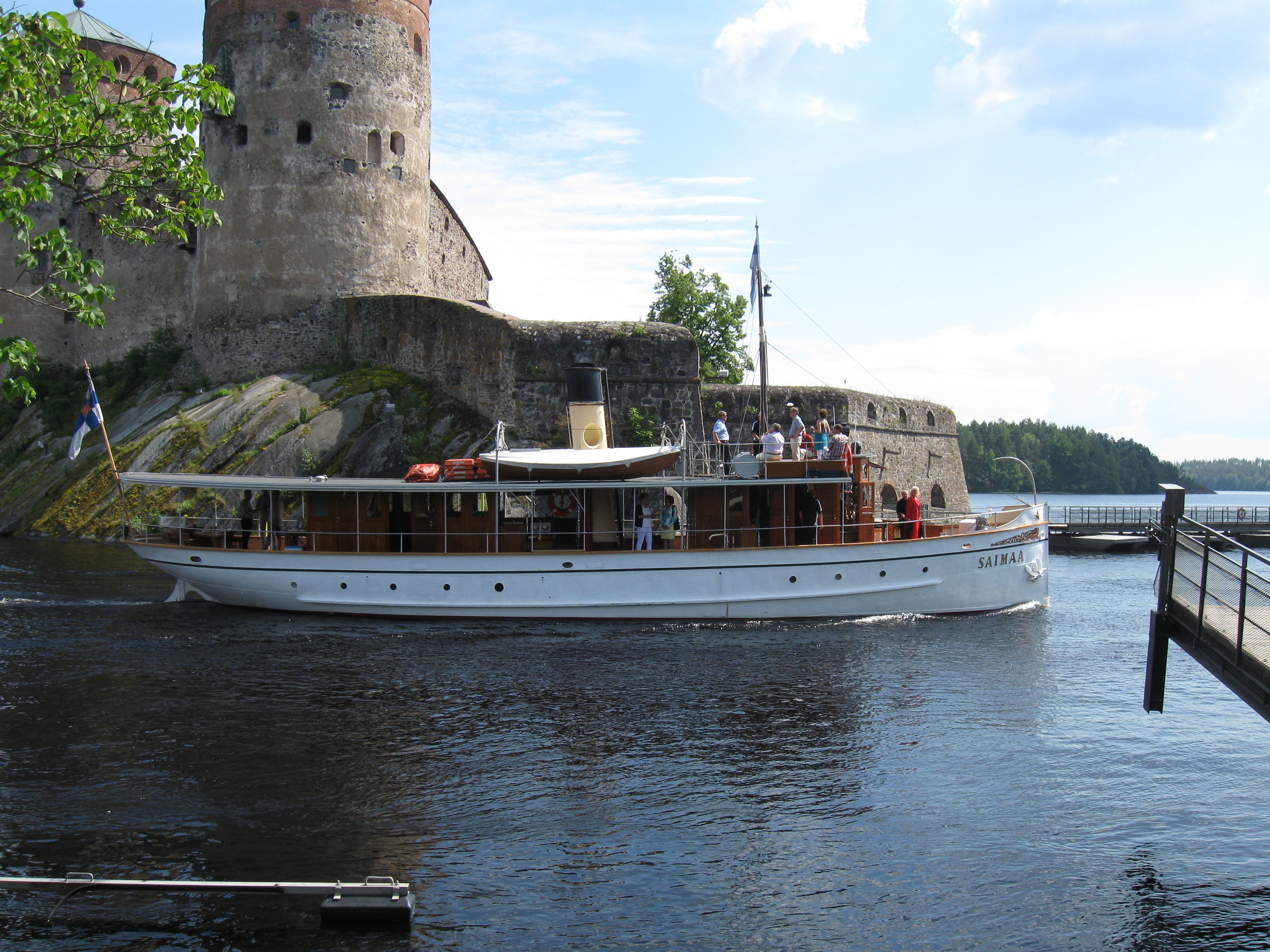
S/S Saimaa cruising at Olavinlinna

The hull of the 1860s built paddle steamer Lahtis has survived. The ship is currently undergoing a thorough rebuild.

Many of the W:m Crichton & C:o's vessels built for the public authorities served for decades, some of them surviving over 100 years of age. The main reason for this was the Finnish government's purchasing policy; as long as it was cheaper in the short term to operate old ships rather than invest on new craft, the old vessels were kept in service. The 1867 built steam cruiser Suomi, that served as customs control vessel, was in use until 1935. Hydrographic survey ship Sekstant, later Åland, operated from 1872 until 1959. The 1878 built light vessel Taipaleenluoto served on lake Ladoga until the Winter War and the subsequent Moscow Peace Treaty in 1940, after which it stayed in the territory ceded to Soviet Union; the fate of the ship is unknown. Customs control ship Nordvakten built in the same year was broken up in 1959.

Light vessel Relandersgrund built in 1888 served until 1977, when it was decommissioned under name Vuolle. The badly decayed ship was salvaged from a shipbreaker in 1991, after which she was thoroughly renovated and nowadays she serves as a restaurant ship in Helsinki. Relandersgrund is the oldest surviving Finnish light vessel.

In 1892 the company built two light ships, which were sisters: Nahkiainen was used until 1976 and Ärangsgrund was later converted into cargo ship that operated until the 1980s. The 1893 built pilot ship Saimaa has remained nearly original and she still operates in summertime by her Crichton-made steam engine.
