= Military of the Grand Duchy of Finland =

Between 1809 and 1917, Finland was an autonomous part of the Russian Empire as the Grand Duchy of Finland. Between 1881 and 1901, the grand duchy had its own army. Before that, several other military units had also been formed.

The Grand Duchy inherited its allotment system (Finnish: ruotujakolaitos, Swedish: indelningsverket) from the Swedish military organization. However, for several decades, Russian rulers did not require military service from Finland – operations and defence were mostly taken care by Russian troops based in the grand duchy. As a result, officer benefits of the allotment system became practically pensions, as payment was based on passive availability, not on actual service.

The Diet of Finland made a pact with Tsar Alexander I; Finland paid a tax to Russia as compensation and military service was not called. This lasted until the Crimean War, 1854, during and after which Finland set up some sharpshooter battalions based on rote system.

== Napoleonic wars ==
In March 1810, Tsar Alexander I ordered the dissolution for 50 years of the Finnish units that had been part of the Swedish Army. At the same time, the allotment system remained as the basis of Finnish military organization. As a result of Alexander's order, enlisted men were not drafted, but officers, non-commissioned officers and military officials retained their previous benefits. A Senate military affairs committee was set up in 1809 to handle all matters pertaining to the allotment system.

Upon Napoleon's invasion of Russia in 1812, the Minister–Secretary of State for Finland in St. Petersburg, Count Gustaf Mauritz Armfelt, advocated for a recruited force of 2,400 light Jäger, who would operate on skis in the winter. Essentially in accordance with Armfelt's proposals, Tsar Alexander on 16 September 1812 ordered the establishment of three foot regiments, each with a strength of 1,200 men. The recruits were supposed to be volunteers, but already by early October 1812, vagabonds and men without legal employment were being impressed into service in the regiments. The mission of these forces was to defend Finland, but they could also be sent to defend other Baltic areas.

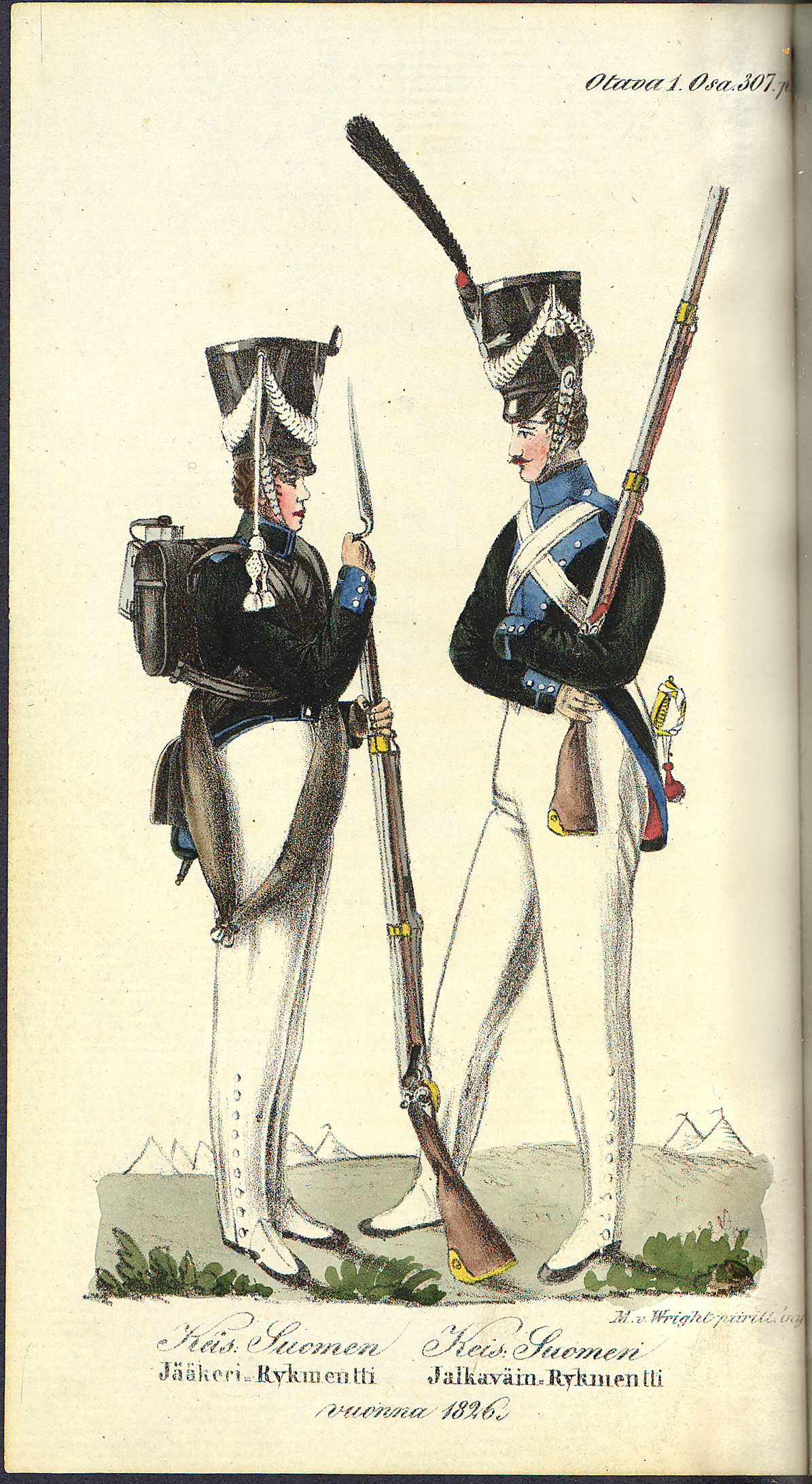
Finnish Jaeger Regiment, Finnish Infantry Regiment, 1826.

In 1819, the following military units were in Finland:

- 1st Infantry Regiment
  - 1st Turku Battalion
  - 2nd Vaasa Battalion
- 2nd Infantry Regiment
  - 3rd Hämeenlinna Battalion
  - 4th Heinola Battalion
- Finnish Jaeger Regiment
  - 5th Vyborg Battalion
  - 6th Kuopio Battalion
- Helsinki Training Battalion
- Finnish Cadet School

As was typical for the era, military training was a matter of formality, with the Viipuri Jäger Regiment only receiving gunpowder and cartridges after pulling security duty in St. Petersburg for two months. Only then were the men trained to load and fire their rifles. Three firing exercises were held annually and each time the men would shoot four times from a distance of 80 paces (61 meters). None of the regiments took part in any combat. All were disbanded in 1830.

In 1827 the military was reorganized:

- I Brigade
  - 1. Turku Sharpshooter Battalion
  - 2. Vaasa Sharpshooter Battalion
- II Brigade
  - 3. Hämeenlinna Sharpshooter Battalion
  - 4. Heinola Sharpshooter Battalion
- III Brigade
  - 5. Kuopio Sharpshooter Battalion
  - 6. Vyborg Sharpshooter Battalion
- Helsinki Training Sharpshooter Battalion
- Finnish Cadet School

A battalion had four companies of one hundred men. Together, the troops formed a division.

The Helsinki Training Sharpshooter Battalion formed in 1827 was renamed Finnish Guards' Sharpshooter Battalion (Finnish: Henkikaartin 3. Suomen Tarkk’ampujapataljoona, Swedish: Livgardets 3:e finska skarpskyttebataljon) which was more commonly known as the Guard of Finland (Suomen kaarti, Finska gardet). It remained as a unit of the Russian Imperial Guard until 1905 when it was disbanded. The Cadet school in Hamina was founded in 1812 and existed until 1903. A Finnish Grenadier Sharpshooter Battalion (Suomen krenatööritarkk’ampujapataljoona, Finska grenadjärskarpskyttebataljonen) was founded in 1846, but later disbanded in 1860.

A Navy unit, the First Finnish Naval Equipage (Finnish: Ensimmäinen Suomen meriekipaasi, Swedish: Första Finska sjöekipaget) was founded in 1830. It had up to 1,000 men and officers. It was succeeded by the Finnish Cadre Equipage (Suomen kaaderiekipaasi, Finska kaderekipaget) in 1862. The ships were mostly small sailing vessels, but also comprised a couple of bigger steam frigates, the Rurik and the Kalevala, named after the Finnish national epic. The Second Finnish Naval Equipage (Toinen Suomen meriekipaasi, Andra Finska sjöekipaget) was founded during the Åland War, part of the Crimean War. Finnish Navy artillery-men fought against the British and French fleets from the Santahamina island shore batteries during the siege of Fortress Sveaborg in Helsinki.

Naval crewmen were greatly reduced in number during the 1860s and 1870s and finally the unit was disbanded in the 1880s.

The naval personnel were housed in a garrison building in Katajanokka called Merikasarmi (Swedish: Marinkasernen) in Helsinki. Today, the building houses the foreign ministry.

== Crimean war ==
During the Crimean War, nine battalions were formed in Finland. The soldiers were drafted using the allotment system, a remnant from the Swedish time. The battalions were disbanded in 1867.

- Finnish Allotment 1. Turku Sniper Battalion
- Finnish Allotment 2. Vaasa Sharpshooter Battalion
- Finnish Allotment 3. Oulu Sharpshooter Battalion
- Finnish Allotment 4. Kuopio Sharpshooter Battalion
- Finnish Allotment 5. Mikkeli Sharpshooter Battalion
- Finnish Allotment 6. Hämeenlinna Sharpshooter Battalion
- Finnish Allotment 7. Pori Sharpshooter Battalion
- Finnish Allotment 8. Uusimaa Sharpshooter Battalion
- Finnish Allotment 9. Vyborg Sharpshooter Battalion

== The conscription act of 1878 ==
Ranks
English	Finnish	Swedish	Russian
Generals	Kenraalit	Generaler	Генералы
General	Kenraali	General	Генерал
Lieutenant-General	Kenraaliluutnantti	Generallöjtnant	Генерал-лейтенант
Major-General	Kenraalimajuri	Generalmajor	Генерал-майор
Field officers	Esiupseerit	Stabsofficerare	Штаб-офицеры
Colonel	Eversti	Överste	Полковник
Lieutenant Colonel	Everstiluutnantti	Överstelöjtnant	Подполковник
Company officers	Yliupseerit	Överofficerare	Обер-офицеры
Captain	Kapteeni	Kapten	Капитан
Second Captain	Alikapteeni	Stabskapten	Штабс-капитан
Lieutenant	Luutnantti	Löjtnant	Поручик
Sub-Lieutenant	Aliluutnantti	Underlöjtnant	Подпоручик
Ensign	Vänrikki	Fänrik	Прапорщик
NCO	Alipäällikkö-kunta ja miehistö	Underofficerer samt manskap	Унтер-офицеры
Capitaine d'armes	Varusmestari	Rustmästare	Каптенармус
Senior Sergeant	Vanhempi aliupseeri	Äldre underofficer	Старший унтер-офицер
Junior Sergeant	Nuorempi aliupseeri	Yngre underofficer	Младший унтер-офицер
Corporal	Korpraali	Korpral	Ефрейтор
Soldier	Sotamies	Soldat	Рядовой

During the 1860s, conscription was seen as an effective way to maintain an army. In 1878, a law was passed by the Diet of Finland and the Emperor Alexander II calling for a general conscription in Finland. The result was an army that was separated from the Russian army. The army was to consist of only Finnish citizens and was to be led by the Governor-General of Finland. The maximum number of men in the army was set to 5,600 and it was to consist of:

- Henkivartioväen 3. Tarkk'ampujapataljoona (Helsinki) / Лейб-гвардии 3-й стрелковый Финский батальон (г. Гельсингфорс)
- Suomen 1. Uudenmaan Tarkk'ampujapataljoona (Helsinki) / 1-й Нюландский финский стрелковый батальон (г. Гельсингфорс)
- Suomen 2. Turun Tarkk'ampujapataljoona (Turku) / 2-й Абоский финский стрелковый батальон (г. Або)
- Suomen 3. Vaasan Tarkk'ampujapataljoona (Vaasa) / 3-й Вазаский финский стрелковый батальон (г. Николайстад)
- Suomen 4. Oulun Tarkk'ampujapataljoona (Oulu) / 4-й Улеаборгский финский стрелковый батальон (г. Улеаборг)
- Suomen 5. Kuopion Tarkk'ampujapataljoona (Kuopio) / 5-й Куопиоский финский стрелковый батальон (г. Куопио)
- Suomen 6. Mikkelin Tarkk'ampujapataljoona (Mikkeli) / 6-й Санкт-Михельский финский стрелковый батальон (г. Санкт-Михель)
- Suomen 7. Hämeenlinnan Tarkk'ampujapataljoona (Hämeenlinna) / 7-й Тавастгусский финский стрелковый батальон (г. Тавастгус)
- Suomen 8. Viipurin Tarkk'ampujapataljoona (Viipuri) / 8-й Выборгский финский стрелковый батальон (г. Выборг)
- Suomen Rakuunarykmentti (Lappeenranta) (1890) / Финский драгунский полк (г. Вильманстранд)
- Suomen Kadettikoulu (Hamina) / Финский кадетский корпус (г. Фридрихсгам)

=== Organisation ===
The battalions were founded in 1880–1881 and reached full strength in 1883. Each infantry battalion consisted of four companies. The Finnish Dragoon Regiment (Rakuunarykmentti, Dragonregemente) consisted of six squadrons (eskadroona). Thirty-two reserve companies were formed in 1883. The conscripts were selected by a lottery. For those selected to serve, the period of service was three years. However, those with a comprehensive education (at least four years at school) had a service period of two years. The conscripts who were university students served only a year. Those not selected to serve the full period served one month each summer for three years in the reserve company of their region.

=== Uniforms ===
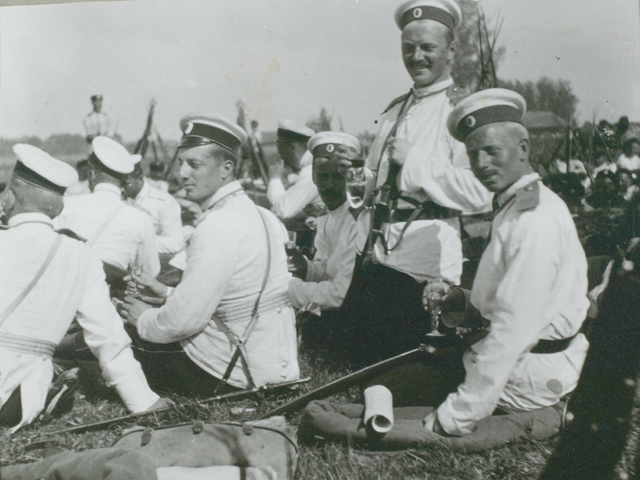
Officers and men of the Finnish Dragoon Regiment, ca. 1890.

All Finnish line units wore the dark green uniforms of the Imperial Russian infantry and dragoons but with light blue facings as a distinction. The Guards Sharpshooters' Battalion wore yellow facings on its dark green uniform, until it was disbanded in 1905.

=== Disbandment ===
Between 1901 and 1905, the separate Finnish army battalions underwent a series of disbandments, concluding with that of the Guards Sharpshooters' Battalion. This was part of the political "oppression years" which saw a downgrading of the autonomous status of the grand duchy within the Russian Empire.

The original intention was that Finnish recruits would continue to serve but in regular Russian units of the Imperial Russian Army stationed elsewhere. This however met with widespread opposition, with under half of the conscripts called for service in 1902 reporting for training. Accordingly, conscription in Finland was terminated in 1905. A special tax was substituted; to be paid from the Finnish Senate to the Imperial treasury.

== See also ==
- Finland Guard Regiment
- Finnish Rifle Battalion
- Finnish Defence Forces
- Finnish Army
- Finnish Army (1939)

== Sources ==
- Kronlund, Jarl (1988), Suomen puolustuslaitos: 1918–1939, Porvoo: WSOY, ISBN 951-0-14799-0
- J.E.O. Screen, Suomalaiset tarkk'ampujat - Suomen vanha sotaväki 1881 - 1901 (ISBN 952-9872-11-9)
- J.E.O. Screen, The Finnish Army, 1881 - 1901 - Training the Rifle Battalions (ISBN 951-710-035-3)
