= Åbo Skeppswarf =

Shipbuilding company in Turku, Finland Proper

Åbo Skeppswarfs Ab
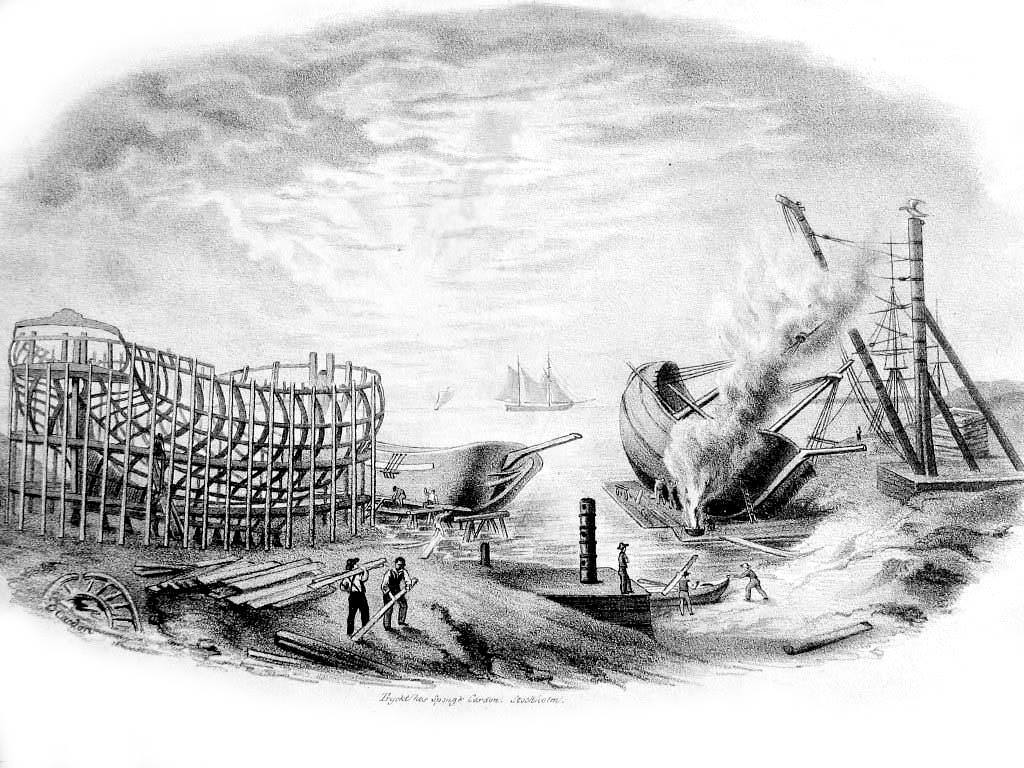
- Åbo Gamla Skeppswarf in about 1840.
- Native name: Swedish: Åbo Skeppwarf Aktie Bolaget; Finnish: Turun Laivaveistämö Osakeyhtiö
- Formerly: Robert Fithie (1741–1765); C. G. Fithie (1765–1782); Gamla Skeppwarf Bolaget (1782–1796); Gamla Skeppswarfet (1795–1800); Åbo Gamla Skeppswarf Ab (1800–1841); Gamla Warfsbolaget i Åbo (1841–1871)
- Company type: osakeyhtiö
- Industry: shipbuilding
- Predecessor: Wechter & Rungeen (1732–1741)
- Founded: November 16, 1741 in Turku, Sweden
- Founder: Robert Fithie
- Defunct: October 26, 1883
- Fate: acquired by W:m Crichton & C:o Ab
- Headquarters: Turku, Sweden (1742–1809); Grand Duchy of Finland, Russian Empire (1809–1882)
- Number of employees: over 300 (early 1880s)

Åbo Skeppswarfs Aktie Bolaget was a shipbuilding company that operated in Turku, Finland Proper, in 1741–1883.

The company was started by Robert Fithie, who later handed over the business to his son Carl Fithie. After this the yard operated under different names and the owners were mostly local Finnish merchants. The company was also a significant rope producer. The first steamship was built in 1834 and in 1851 the company built the largest ship in Finland at the time. The last sailing merchant ship was built in 1878.

In the early 1880s the company employed 300 people. The major shareholder became William Crichton, the owner of the neighbouring yard. He bought the company and in 1883 he incorporated it to his own yard W:m Crichton & C:o Ab.

== Background ==
=== Foundation of Wechter & Rungeen ===
The history of the shipyard goes back to year 1732, when Turku merchants Esaias Wechter and Henric Rungeen founded a repair yard on east bank of river Aura, next to Korppolaismäki. Manager of the company was Vasa-born shipmaster Israel Hansson. At the beginning the company focused on repairing and maintaining vessels of the local shipowners, but it also ordered ships from Ostrobothnian shipbuilders. One of such vessels was Södra Finlands Wapn, which was owned jointly by Hansson, Rungeen, Wechter and few others. The ship operated successfully between Finland and Spain in 1732–1738, bringing every time at least 4 000 barrels of salt to Turku.

=== Beginning of shipbuilding in Turku ===
Turku was awarded a monopoly for foreign trade in Finland in 1525, and to support trading, the Swedish king Gustaf Vasa founded a shipyard in Turku. Soon such state-operated yards were founded also in other coastal areas of Finland; the vessels built were primarily for the navy.

Foundation of shipbuilding in modern sense took place in 1737, when the owners of Wechter & Rungeen decided to start producing ships. Licence for that was awarded in the same December by the Swedish king. The company hired from Nykarleby a skilled master shipbuilder, Scotsman Robert Fithie, who had worked before at Djurgården shipyard in Stockholm. Fithie led at least three large shipbuilding projects in Turku during years 1738–1741. The first ship produced by the yard was merchant ship Fortuna. Fithie built a dredger for the city of Turku; after that he also managed dredging of river Aura in 1740 and led the river dredging operations for the following 20 years.

Wechter and Rungeed could not get along due to political dissensions. Shipbuilding was discontinued when the Russo-Swedish war broke out; the last vessel produced by Wechter & Rungeen fled from Turku loaded with refugees, escaping to Sweden the advancing Russian troops.

== Robert and Carl Fithie ==
Robert Fithie resigned from Wechter & Rungeen in 1741 started his own shipbuilding company. He bought a lot on the west bank of river Aura and built a shipbuilding cradle and a timber storage unit there. Fithie got commercial rights in November 1741. The war which had broken out the previous summer led to Russian occupation of Finland, and although many escaped to Sweden, Fithie stayed in Turku. The Russians ordered him to build ten galleys. Eventually, just six units were built, because the Ostrobothnian shipbuilders resisted the project and escaped to Sweden – reportedly, taking Fithie with them.

The war ended with the Treaty of Turku and Russian withdrawal in June 1743, after which Fithie's yard focused on ship repairs. In 1747 Fithie got the right to extend the yard for larger vessels and to start rope production. The rope factory was built next to the street between the city centre and Turku Castle. Most of the raw material hemp was imported from Riga.

The very first shipbuilders' strike in Turku took place in 1743; the yard workers complained about low wages and that they were only employed during open water time. The strike did not lead to results – instead, the workers were forced to return to work under threat of a fine. Another strike in 1758 led to a more favourable result for the workers; Fithie promised to employ them all year round.

Robert Fithie retired in 1765 at the age of 64 and handed the business over to his son Carl Gustaf. At first Carl Gustaf Fithie had to struggle with a poor economic situation and compete with Henrik Hasselius, who had started shipbuilding in 1755 and moved in Turku in 1774, to the same place on the east bank where Wechter & Rungeen had operated before. A third yard was founded by the merchant Joseph Bremer in 1782; it was located upstream from the two others.

Despite the increased competition, Carl Fithie had a fairly good order backlog in the early 1770s, and the demand grew during the American War of Independence 1775–1783; shipping was then more profitable than it had ever been before in the 18th century. Ships were built all days and nights by 40 craftsmen. The capacity of the Turku yards was fully used.

Carl Fithie perished in 1782 after which his widow sold the company to a consortium formed by Turku merchants and shipowners.

== Old Shipyard ==
The Fithie yard was renamed Gamla Skeppswarfet, "Old Shipyard", to distinguish it from the Bremer yard. The manager was appointed Hasselius, who had sold his own yard. In 1783 the yard employed 32 and the rope factory ten men. The Old Shipyard and Bremer Yard competed of orders, raw materials and skilled workforce. The Russo-Swedish War 1788–1790 guaranteed a good order level of newbuildings as well as repairing projects for both yards. Also the French Revolutionary Wars began in the early 1790s increased the order intake.

Bremer gave up with shipbuilding in 1794 after buying Teijo Iron Mill; in the same year the Old Shipyard was bought by Erik. J. Hartwall. In year 1800 captain Gustaf Adolf Dammert bought the company and sold it on to a consortium of local businessmen, who operated the yard under name Åbo Gamla Skeppswarf, "Turku Old Shipyard". The company manager became captain Petter Claesson. The demand of vessels was sluggish in the early 19th century; the Finnish War and the subsequent Russian annexation of Finland did not affect the yard. The orders consisted only repairs projects, and the yard had just enough income to be able to run the operations. The Great Fire of Turku caused a drop in volumes, as the local merchants were not able to invest on new craft. The yard strived overtaking the difficulties through modernisation; in 1833 the company invested on a new workshop building.

The yard master shipbuilder was Erik Malm until his death in 1829, and he was succeeded by Anders Kjeldman, who held the post until 1842. During Malm's era, the company only had few drawings which were used on many ships. The drawings were based on theories by the 18th century Swedish shipbuilder Fredrik Henrik af Chapman. Also Kjeldman applied af Chapman's theories, but made changes according to the available raw materials.

== Steamer era ==
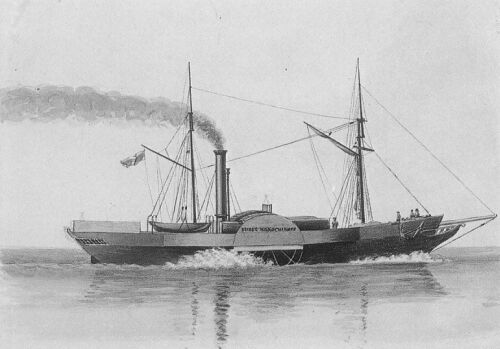
Furst Menschikoff pictured in 1842.

The first steamship built at the yard was 1834 ordered Furst Menschikoff, which was launched in June 1836. The shipowner company was led by Erik Julin, who became a co-owner of the yard in 1838.

The hull measurements of Furst Menschikoff differed considerably from those of the contemporary sailing ships; the ratio between the length and width was normally about three and half, but now it was about six. The long hull was a modern feature and made to fit the requirements of an engine propelled ship. Most likely Kjeldman had received the drawings from some foreign ship designer. The hull was made from pine and constructed by using carvel method.

The next steam ship was the cargo ship Murtaja launched in 1840. The yard had a reputation of high quality work; it was possibly the best Finnish shipyard in the 1830s and 1840s.

The rope factory was renewed in 1837 after plans by architect Pehr Johan Gylich; it was further extended in 1842. The factory production was used at the yard and also sold outside. The building was the longest in Finland at its time. During the 1840s the yard experienced an increased order intake, mainly from Russia, and the yard area was enlarged towards downstream of the river in 1846, when the company bought a lot next to the Turku Castle. Also a new slipway equipped with a mechanical winch was built primarily for reparations of increasingly common steamships.

The company articles of association were renewed in 1841 after an initiative by Julin. It was renamed Gamla Warfsbolaget i Åbo, "old shipbuilding company in Turku". After the death of the master shipbuilder Kjeldman the company wanted to find a replacement for him, who would be up to date about the newest technology. Development had been rapid, and af Chapman's theories started to be outdated. It would have been challenging to find in Finland a person who is skilled enough, so the company hired Danish shipbuilder Carl Johan Fredrik Jørgensen, who had been educated at the military shipyard in Copenhagen. Although the yard had got a good reputation already during Kjeldman's era, Jørgensen further improved it. The yard produced at least 20 large ships of which five were steam powered, until Jørgensen left in 1868. In 1846–1849 the yard built three the whalers Sitka, Atka and Fröja, which later operated in Russian Alaskan waters. In 1850 Furst Menschikoff II was finished, becoming the first ship to be powered by Turku-produced steam engine, made by Cowie & Eriksson. Another significant vessel was the 1851–1853 produced steam frigate Rurik; the 191-foot (58 m) long vessel was the largest ship built in Finland until then.

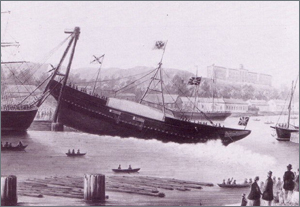
Launch of steam frigate Rurik in 1851.

A steam powered sawmill was built in 1857. A massive investment followed when Gamla Warfsbolaget made a new slipway which was ready to service in 1865. It was equipped with a Bergsund Engineering Works produced steam powered winch which used a nearly 80-metre long platform lying on 194 wheels. The project leader was Swedish engineer J. A. Berg, whose plans were inspired by the Stockholm Långholmen yard. The total cost of the construction was 280 000 marks and 200 000 marks' share was funded by a loan given by the government. For a long time the slipway was largest of its kind in Finland.

After Jørgensen had left in 1868, the new shipbuilding master became L. P. Kjäldström from Nykarleby. He served until 1875 and was followed by Danish Christian Lund. He was the company's last master shipbuilder, as the wood was giving way to steel as construction material at the Old Shipbuilding Company. The only large project led by Lund was the 1876–1878 built 1 000-tonne frigate Ägir, which was the company's last sailing merchant ship. The weaknesses of wooden hulls had come out already soon after the first Furst Menschikoff was built. The wooden structure withstood well the waves and other stress which came outside, but the continuous motion of steam engine loosened the seams and by time weakened the construction so much that the ship had to be decommissioned already after about ten years' service.

In the 1870s the number of employees was around 200; the headcount went up to 300 at the early 1880s.

The articles of association were renewed again in 1871 and the company name was once more changed. The share capital of Åbo Skeppswarfs Aktie Bolaget, "Turku shipyard limited", was 400 000 marks and divided to 80 shares, each of 5 000 marks value. The owners were E. Julin Trading House and William Crichton, who owned another yard in Turku.

== Takeover by Crichton ==
Crichton became the major shareholder in the 1870s and he became the company manager in 1878. He invested on rib steel workshop and riveting technology. The yard subcontracted two steel hulls for Crichton's own yard; the ships were Zurukan and Spasitelra built for oil transport at Caspian Sea. Julin had died in 1874, and in 1882 the yard owners were Crichton with 51 shares, commercial counsellor F. V. Martinson with 27 shares and two shares were owned by doctor A. Spoof. The company was discontinued in October 1883; the property was auctioned and bought by Crichton for 300 000 marks. Subsequently, the Crichton yard became the largest company of Turku with personnel of 936 and 1 589 000 marks' turnover.

== Some of the vessels built at the yard in 1836–1879 ==
| Year | Name | Type | Length | Width | Tonnage |
|---|---|---|---|---|---|
| 1836 | Furst Menschikoff | paddle steamer | 118 ft 4 in (36.07 m) | 20 ft 6 in (6.25 m) | |
| 1839 | Aura | barque | | | |
| 1839 | Naslednick | barque | | | |
| 1840 | Murtaja | paddle steamer | 134 ft 8 in (41.05 m) | 23 ft (7.0 m) | 25 läst |
| 1841 | | frigate | | | |
| 1841 | Norden | frigate | 132 ft (40 m) | 35 ft 8 in (10.87 m) | 370 läst |
| 1843 | Constantin | barque | 118 ft 3 in (36.04 m) | 32 ft (9.8 m) | 240 läst |
| 1845 | | 2 × customs steamboats | | | |
| 1846 | Sitka | barque | 115 ft 3 in (35.13 m) | 31 ft (9.4 m) | 216 läst |
| 1847 | Atka | barque | 119 ft 6 in (36.42 m) | 32 ft (9.8 m) | 215 läst |
| 1847 | Preciosa | brig | 98 ft 5 in (30.00 m) | 27 ft (8.2 m) | 130 läst |
| 1848 | Suomi | barque | 124 ft 6 in (37.95 m) | 33 ft (10 m) | 252 läst |
| 1849 | Fröja | barque | 117 ft (36 m) | 31 ft 5 in (9.58 m) | 207 läst |
| 1850 | Furst Menschikoff II | paddle steamer | 146 ft (45 m) | 23 ft 1 in (7.04 m) | 22 läst |
| 1850 | Nikolai I | frigate | | | |
| 1851 | Rurik | steam frigate | 191 ft (58 m) | 27 ft (8.2 m) | |
| 1852 | Rapide | brig | 106 ft (32 m) | 27 ft 8 in (8.43 m) | 135 läst |
| 1852 | Turku | barque | 120 ft 5 in (36.70 m) | 31 ft (9.4 m) | 241 läst |
| 1852 | Constantin | barque | 123 ft (37 m) | 32 ft 5 in (9.88 m) | 221 läst |
| 1853 | Baron von Haartman | barque | 123 ft (37 m) | 32 ft (9.8 m) | 266 läst |
| 1853 | | 15 × gunboat | | | |
| 1857 | Storfursten | barque | 133 ft 3 in (40.61 m) | 33 ft 8 in (10.26 m) | 287 läst |
| 1857 | Grefve Berg | barque | 138 ft 2 in (42.11 m) | 34 ft (10 m) | 300 läst |
| 1857 | Kalevala | steam corvette | | | |
| 1860 | Åbo | frigate | 119 ft 7 in (36.45 m) | 32 ft (9.8 m) | 432 läst |
| 1862 | Turku | barque | 140 ft 9 in (42.90 m) | 31 ft 8 in (9.65 m) | 297 läst |
| 1865 | Finland (former Grefve Berg) | barque; reconditioning | | | |
| 1866 | Aimo | frigate | 171 ft 1 in (52.15 m) | 36 ft 6 in (11.13 m) | 440 läst |
| 1869 | Lennätär | barque | 155 ft 8 in (47.45 m) | 25 ft 9 in (7.85 m) | 300 läst |
| 1869 | Constantin | barque | 156 ft 2 in (47.60 m) | 26 ft 2 in (7.98 m) | 319 läst |
| 1870 | Samojed | steam schooner | 175 ft (53 m) | | |
| 1870 | Komar | schooner | 73 ft (22 m) | | |
| 1871 | Rurik | barque; reconditioning | | | 448 läst |
| 1872 | Rurik | steam frigate | 200 ft (61 m) | | |
| 1872 | Neptun | schooner | 140 ft 9 in (42.90 m) | 21 ft 7 in (6.58 m) | 146 läst |
| 1872 | Rapid | schooner | 140 ft 9 in (42.90 m) | 21 ft 7 in (6.58 m) | 147 läst |
| 1873 | | 11 × gunboat | | | |
| 1874 | Olof | steam frigate | | | |
| 1879 | Ägir | frigate | 210 ft (64 m) | 42 ft (13 m) | |

== Sources ==
- Grönros, Jarmo; Kujanen, Hannu; Priamursky, G.; Rinta-Tassi, Osmo; Saarinen, Jarmo; Teräs, Kari; Trofimov, S. (1996). Aurajoen rautakourat — Järnnävarna vid Aura Å (in Finnish and Swedish). Turku, Finland: Turun maakuntamuseo — Åbo landskapsmuseum. ISBN 951-595-020-1.
- von Knorring, Nils (1995). Aurajoen veistämöt ja telakat [Boat- and Shipyards along River Aura] (in Finnish). Espoo, Finland: Schildts Förlags Ab. ISBN 951-50-0735-6.
