= Russian frigate Rurik (1851) =

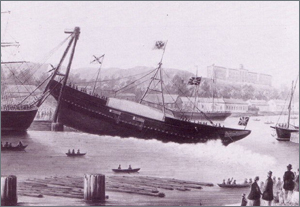

History

Russia
- Name: Rurik
- Namesake: Rurik
- Builder: Gamla Warfsbolaget i Åbo
- Launched: 30 October 1851

General characteristics
- Type: Steam-powered frigate
- Displacement: 1500 tons
- Propulsion: 24 foot paddle; 300 horsepower steam engine by Cowie & Erikson, Turku
- Speed: 11 knots (20 km/h)
- Armament: 12 guns

Rurik (Рюрик) was a steam-powered frigate of the Imperial Russian Navy. She was ordered by the Senate of the Grand Duchy of Finland for the Finnish naval equipage (Suomen Meriekipaasi). She was named in honour of Rurik, the semi-legendary founder of ancient Russia.

Rurik was designed by Johan Eberhard von Schantz. She was built in Turku at Gamla Warfsbolaget i Åbo and launched in October 1851. At the time of her construction she was the largest ship ever built in Finland. The Scottish engineer William Crichton was recruited to supervise construction of the steam engine. Later he took over the engine builder Cowie & Ericsson and renamed it W:m Crichton & C:o.

Although financed by Finns, the ship ended up serving as an escort vessel to the Russian Imperial Yacht. She survived the Crimean War, and later served in the Russian Baltic Fleet.

== See also ==
- Rurik (1892) - armoured cruiser sunk at the Battle off Ulsan
- Rurik (1906) - Russian armoured cruiser built by Vickers
