= Von Schantz family =

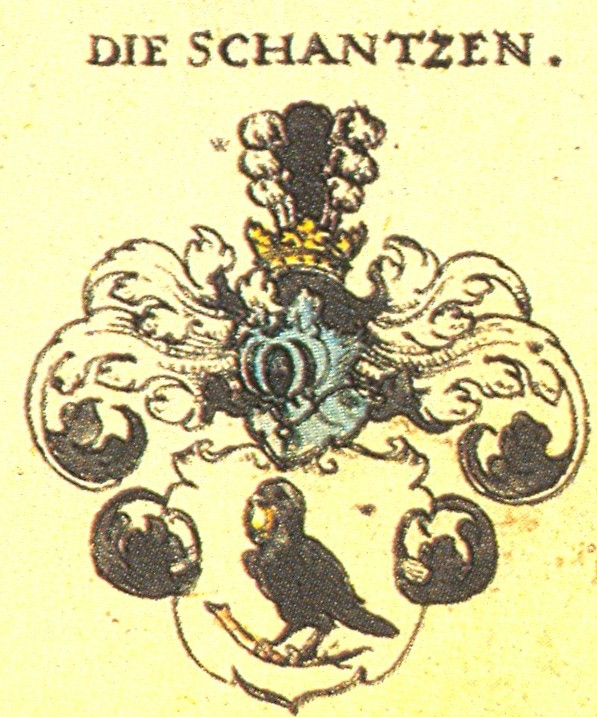

The Schantz family (also spelled von Schantz) is a noble family of German origin in the Swedish and Finnish Houses of Nobility. They are listed as Family Number 1255 by the Swedish House of Nobility, and as Number 95 by the Finnish House of Nobility. The family was knighted in Sweden in 1693 and was immatriculated in to the Finnish nobility in 1818.

== Members ==
Johan Eberhard Schantz (1614–1665) who was descended from Rothenburg ob der Tauber in Germany, moved to Sweden in the 1630s, becoming secretary to King Charles X Gustav. Four of his sons by his second marriage in 1662 with Elisabeth Pfeiff (May 21, 1643 - February 10, 1729) were also in the king's service as secretary and similar positions, and all were knighted.

Of the four sons:

- 1. Johan David Schantz, knighted 1681. Secretary to the Governor-General of Skane, Halland and Blekinge. His line became extinct in 1753.
- 2. Ludwig von Schantz (1650 - 1702), knighted as von Schantz January 4, 1693, Secretary of the National Archives (1701–1702). He married Kristina Fineman c. 1680.

Of this branch, notable was Karl Ludwig von Schantz (15 May 1681, Stockholm - 25 March 1734), archaeologist and Assessor of Antiquities Archives from 1709, and who created a genealogy in 1731. The direct line became extinct in 1798.

- 3. Fredrik von Schantz (1651–1697), knighted as von Schantz January 4, 1693. He married Anna Ursula Scheffer and his descendants continue to live in Sweden.

Of this branch, notable was Johan Fredrik von Schantz (July 9, 1680 - 24 April 1743), secretary of the National Archives (1719-1728), Deputy Director (1728), and then Director of Posts (1737).

- 4. Kristian von Schantz (March 14, 1655 - 2 July 1702 in Kurland or Courland, Latvia), knighted as von Schantz January 4, 1693. He was the Royal Recorder and Secretary. In 1680 he married Adriana Fineman (1661 - 17 December 1725). Amongst their offspring were;

Johan Eberhard von Schantz (July 9, 1687 - 17 October 1762), chamberlain, who from his marriage with Countess Eva Catharina Leijonstedt (April 2, 1695 - 26 June 1762), daughter of the Privy Councillor, Earl Anders Leijonstedt issued;

Anton Wilhelm von Schantz (April 21, 1740 - 6 May 1814) RSO who became a lieutenant colonel in the Pori (Björneborg) regiment in Finland. On April 7, 1772 he married Catharina Elisabeth de Carnall (May 23, 1753 - 16 August 1833), daughter of Major General Carl Konstant de Carnall and Catharina Elisabeth von Knorring, by whom he had issue;

Ottila Aurora Sofia von Schantz, from whom are descended the Aaron Rosenfelds of the United States (according to the family website guestbook).
Karl Konstantin von Schantz, a lieutenant colonel. It is likely he is mentioned in Johan Ludvig Runeberg's poem The Tales of Ensign Stål (Fänrik Ståls sägner). He married Karolina Lovisa Weissmann von Weissenstein. Their daughter was;

Eva Wilhelmina von Schantz (1810 - 1895), one of the leading figures in Finnish society life and who in 1832 married Carl Gustaf Mannerheim.

Ludwig von Schantze (August 25, 1692 - 23 May 1730), married (1721) Eva Maria Petré (June 22, 1703 - 16 March 1798) and whose descendants still live in Sweden.

Other descendants include:

- Kristian Robert von Schantz, married to Anna Margareta Weckström, by whom he had;

Gustaf von Schantz [3] (1775 - 1847), deputy minister (1818), and several times rewarded by the Swedish Academy's gold medal for literature. Married (1814) Ulrika Elisabet Björkman.

- Johan Filip von Schantz (1835 – 1865), Finnish composer and conductor at the Swedish Theatre in Helsinki.
- Johan Eberhard von Schantz (1802 - 1880), Finnish admiral in the Imperial Russian Navy
  - The Schantz Islands, a coral reef on the Marshall Islands, also known as Wotho, was discovered by Johan Eberhard von Schantz on his circumnavigation of the globe on the Imperial Russian ship America.

== See also ==
- The National Biography of Finland
- Swedish-speaking Finns

== Sources ==
- Herman Hofberg, et al. Svenskt biografiskt handlexikon, 1906: von Schantze
- Finlands Riddarhus: von Schantz
- The Genealogical Society of Finland
- Schantz family
