= Alexander Sergeyevich Menshikov =

Russian politician (1787–1869)

His Serene Highness Prince Alexander Sergeyevich Menshikov
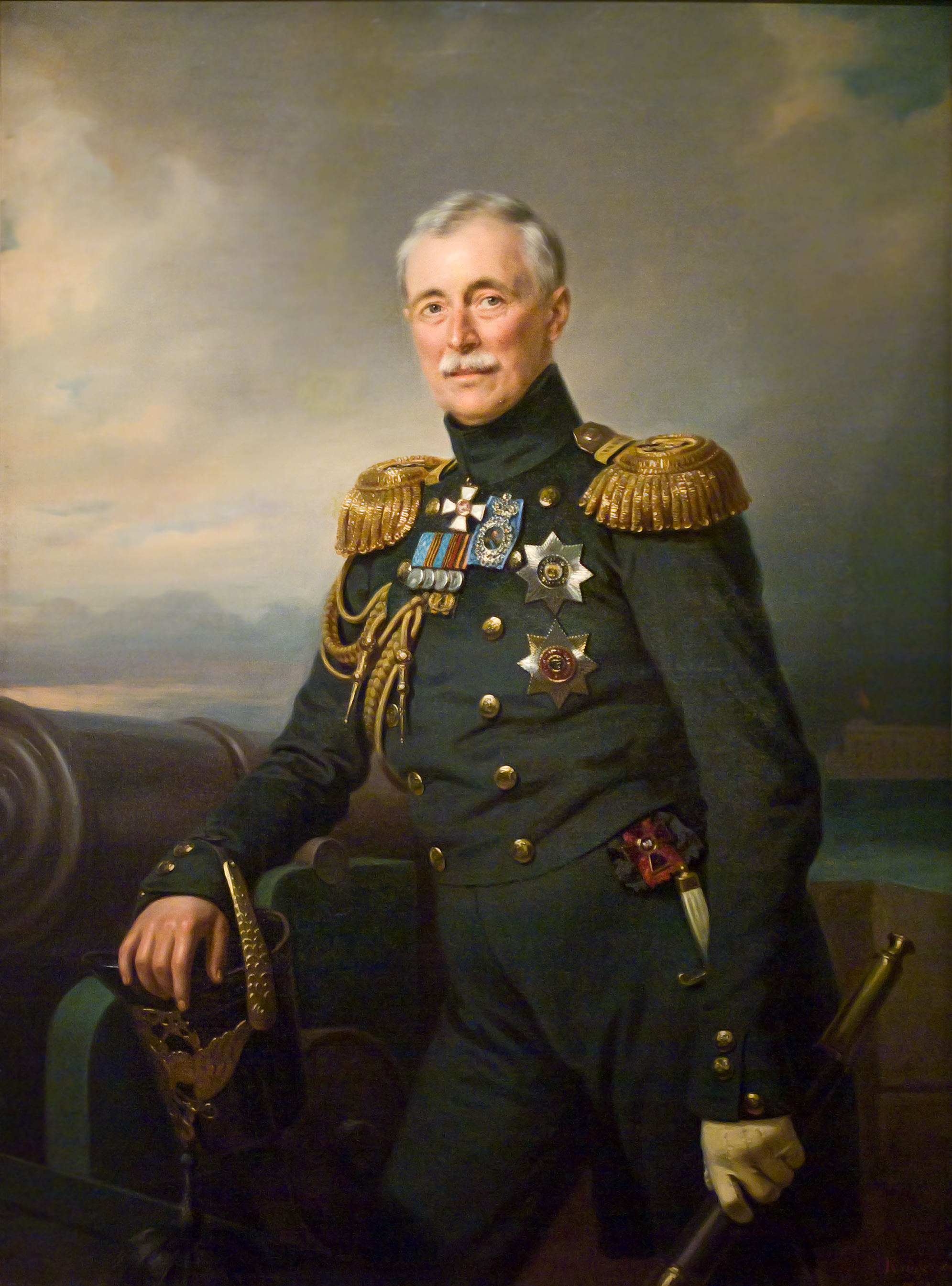
- Alexander Menshikov by Franz Krüger
- Born: 26 August 1787
- Died: 2 May 1869 (aged 81); Saint Petersburg, Russian Empire
- Military career
- Allegiance: Russian Empire
- Branch: (Russian Empire) Imperial Russian Army; Imperial Russian Navy
- Service years: 1809–1856
- Rank: Adjutant general Admiral
- Conflicts: Russo-Turkish War (1806–1812); Napoleonic Wars; Russo-Turkish War (1828–1829); Crimean War
- Awards: Order of St. George

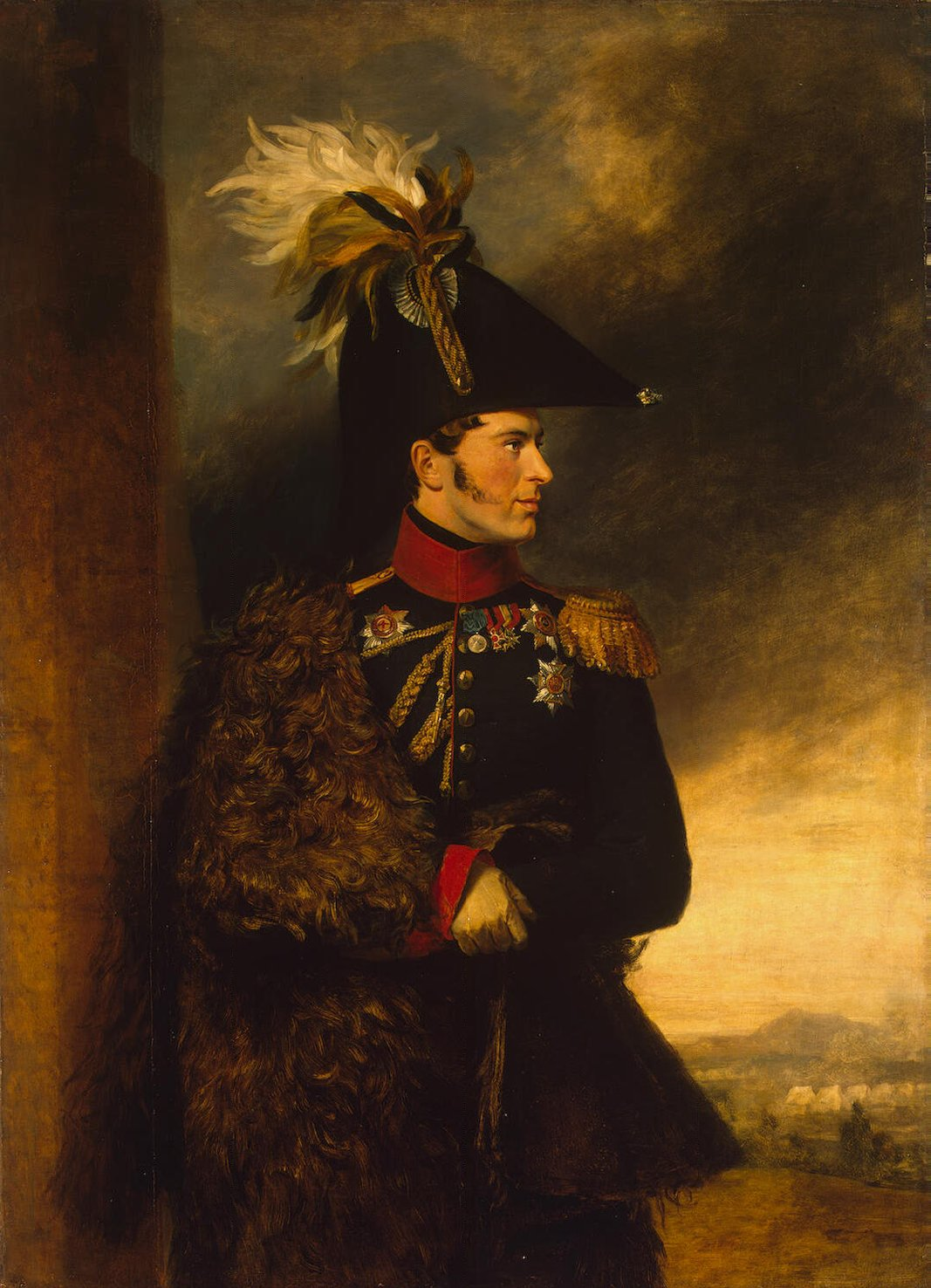
Portrait by George Dawe

Prince Alexander Sergeyevich Menshikov (Russian: Князь Алекса́ндр Серге́евич Ме́ншиков; 26 August 1787 – 2 May 1869) was a Russian nobleman, military commander and statesman. He was made adjutant general in 1817 and admiral in 1833.

A great-grandson of Alexander Danilovich Menshikov, Duke of Ingria, and a cognatic descendant of the Princely House of Golitsyn (another of his great-grandfathers was Prince Mikhail Golitsyn, the military governor of Åbo (Turku) during the Russian occupation in the Great Northern War). Menshikov entered the Russian service as attaché to the embassy at Vienna in 1809. He became close to Tsar Alexander I and accompanied him throughout his campaigns against Napoleon. In 1817 Menshikov was appointed acting Quartermaster general of the General Staff. In 1823, he was transferred to the ministry of foreign affairs. Menshikov retired from army service in 1824.

During the initiation of the Russo-Persian War of 1826–28 and the success of Abbas Mirza's initiative in Tehran, Menshikov was placed under house arrest. He was appointed head of the Naval Headquarters and cabinet minister by Tsar Nicholas I. He distinguished himself at the Siege of Varna in 1828 when an exploding Turkish cannon shell emasculated him. In 1830 he became a member of the State Council. In 1831 Menshikov held the post of Governor-General of Finland. He mainly devoted himself to naval matters. His bad influence on the development of the Russian Navy stalled its technical progress and combat training.

In 1853, Menshikov was sent on a special mission to Constantinople, and when the Crimean War broke out he was appointed commander-in-chief on land and sea. He commanded the Russian army at Alma and Inkerman and showed incompetence and lack of military talent. On 15 February 1855 Menshikov was removed from command and replaced by Prince Mikhail Dmitrievich Gorchakov. Between December 1855 and April 1856, he held the post of Governor General of Kronstadt and then retired. He died in St. Petersburg.

He was created Prince (Fürst) in the Finnish nobility, being the only person of the rank of prince to be registered in the Finnish House of Nobility.

The first Finnish steamship Furst Menschikoff was named after him.

== See also ==
- List of heads of the military of Imperial Russia#Ministry of the Navy

== Sources ==
- Chisholm, Hugh, ed. (1911). "Menshikov, Alexander Sergeievich" . Encyclopædia Britannica. Vol. 18 (11th ed.). Cambridge University Press. p. 134.

Political offices
Preceded by Arseniy Zakrevskiy	Governor-General of Finland; 1831–1855	Succeeded by Friedrich Wilhelm Rembert von Berg
Government offices
Preceded by Anton Moller	Minister of the Navy; 1836–1855	Succeeded by Ferdinand von Wrangel
