= Arvid Adolf Etholén =

Finnish-Russian naval officer, explorer and administrator (1799–1876)

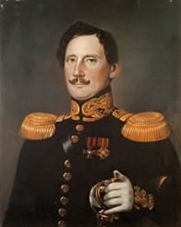
- Arvid Adolf Etholén by J. E. Lindh, 1839
- Born: 9 January 1799; Helsinki, Finland
- Died: 29 March 1876 (aged 77); Elimäki, Finland
- Occupations: Naval officer, explorer, administrator
- Employer: Russian-American Company
- Known for: Chief Manager of Russian America 1840–1845

Arvid Adolf Etholén, or Adolf Karlovich Etolin (Russian: Адольф Карлович Этолин; 9 January 1799 – 29 March 1876) was a naval officer, explorer, ethnographic collector and administrator in the Russian Empire who was employed by the Russian-American Company from July 1818. He was a Swedish-speaking Finn, born in Helsinki in Finland, which was part of Sweden at the time of his birth, but was ceded to Russia in 1809. Etholén first reached Novoarkhangelsk (present-day Sitka, Alaska) in Russian America in the service of the Russian-American Company in 1818, rising to become Chief Manager of the Company between 1840 and 1845. ("Chief Manager" was a position sometimes referred to, though incorrectly, as "Governor"). As Chief Manager he played a significant role in establishing Finns in key positions in the development of the colony.

== Biography ==
=== Early career (1818–1825) ===
Etholén traveled from Russia to Russian America with Vasily Golovnin in the course of Golovnin's round-the-world voyage (1817–1819) on the Kamchatka. Kiril Timofeevich Khlĕbnikov's Baranov, Chief Manager of the Russian Colonies in America (1835), quotes Baranov: "If only the Main Office could have sent me men like yourselves earlier, then I would very likely have had more success, and I would have found it pleasant to pass the time in their company!".

Etholén transferred from the Imperial Russian Navy to the service of the Russian-American Company in July 1818. He served in the Pacific from 1818 to 1825 as ship's master, and was part of a group that surveyed the Bering Sea from 1822 to 1824.

Etholén departed from Kronstadt in August 1817 and arrived at Sitka, the Company's main base, almost a year later. During the following years he commanded Company vessels on trading and supply voyages across the northern Pacific, and participated in two research expeditions charting the Alaskan coast as far as the Bering Strait. When his five-year contract ended in autumn 1824, he returned to Europe via South America, arriving in the summer of 1825. On his return he donated an ethnological collection to the Royal Academy of Åbo, which was unfortunately destroyed in the great fire of Turku in 1827.

=== Second period in Alaska (1826–1845) ===
Having returned to European Russia in 1825, Etholén re-joined the Russian-American Company in 1826, this time travelling to Alaska via Siberia, making him one of the first Finns to have circumnavigated the globe. He was appointed adjutant to the Chief Manager of Russian America in 1834, and became Chief Manager himself from 1840 to 1845.

In November 1838 Etholén was appointed Chief Manager of the Company. He brought with him a group of Finns including captain Johan Bartram, naturalist Reinhold Ferdinand Sahlberg and pastor Uno Cygnaeus — later the founder of the Finnish primary school system — as well as his new wife Margaretha Sundvall, whom he married in June 1839. The group sailed from Helsinki in August 1839 and arrived at Sitka in May 1840 after rounding South America.

During his term as Chief Manager, Etholén oversaw significant development of the colony: he erected public buildings in Sitka, established new outposts, and organised research expeditions to find new sources of income. In a territorial dispute with the British Hudson's Bay Company, he negotiated a settlement whereby he leased them a coastal strip in exchange for food supplies. He also sold the unprofitable colony of Fort Ross in California to the United States. For the indigenous population he established an annual market, built a school, and conducted vaccination campaigns. Pastor Cygnaeus founded Alaska's first Lutheran church during this period.

=== Later life ===
Etholén resigned from the Russian American Company in 1847 with the rank of Vice Admiral. He served as a member of the board of the Russian-American Company in Saint Petersburg, Russia from 1847 to 1859. Etholén was ennobled in 1856 and formally enrolled in the Finnish House of Nobility two years later, attending the Diet as a representative of the Nobility in 1863–76.

Adolf Etholén died at his estate in Elimäki, Finland, in 1876.

== Legacy ==
Coat of Arms of Arvid Adolf Etholén

The name Etolin, based on the Russian version of Etholén's name, can be found in several places on the map of Alaska.

Etolin Island was named after Etolin by the United States in the wake of the Alaska Purchase of 1867 (it was formerly the Duke of York's Island). There is also Etolin Strait, as well as a cape, a point and a mountain.

The Etholén collection (Etholén Alaskassa) in the National Museum of Finland contains over 300 ethnographic items from the Pacific Islands, northwestern America and the Aleutian Islands, donated by Etholén to the University of Helsinki in 1847.

Government offices
Preceded by Ivan Antonovich Kupreianov	Governor of Russian Alaska; 1840—1845	Succeeded by Mikhail Tebenkov
