= Russian frigate Kamchatka =

At least two frigates of the Imperial Russian Navy have been named Kamchatka:

- Russian frigate Kamchatka (1817) circumnavigated the globe between 1817 and 1819 under Captain Vasily Golovnin.
- Russian frigate Kamchatka (1841) a steam frigate, built in New York City in 1841. Made several long voyages under Captain (later Admiral) Johan Eberhard von Schantz.
