= William Crichton (engineer) =

Scottish engineer and shipbuilder (1827-1889)

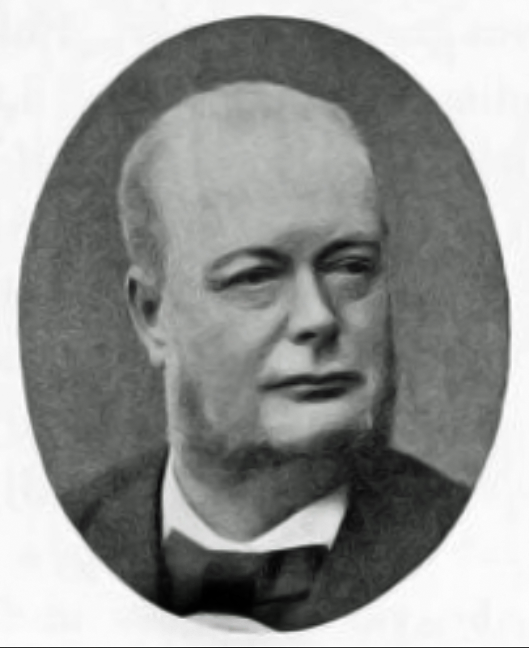
- William Crichton
- Born: 29 November 1827; Leith, Scotland
- Died: 10 April 1889 (aged 61); Turku, Grand Duchy of Finland
- Citizenship: British
- Occupation: engineer
- Employers: Scott, Sinclair & Company (1841–1843); Shotts Iron Company (1843–1845); Robert Napier and Sons (1845–1848); engineer on SS Royal Victoria and SS Isabella Napier (1848–1850); Cowie & Eriksson (1850–1853); Fiskars (1853–1854); Izhorskiye Zavody (1854–1862); W:m Crichton & C:o (1862–1889)
- Successor: John Eager
- Spouse: Annie Elizabeth née Owen
- Children: Louisa Gifford Elisabeth (b. 1856); George (b. 1858); William (b. 1860); Alexander Owen (b. 1862); Anne Mary (b. 1864); John Allan (b. 1865); Alfred (b. 1868); Rurik (b. 1870); Lilly Vera (b. 1872); James Dunlop (b. 1874); Margaret Jemima (b. 1876); Fanny Julin (b. 1879)
- Awards: Great Golden Medal with Stanislaus ribbons (ca. 1860); Order of Saint Stanislaus (1877)

William Crichton (29 November 1827 – 10 April 1889) was a Scottish engineer and shipbuilder who spent most of his career in Turku, located in the Grand Duchy of Finland.

Crichton moved to Turku at the age of 23 to lead a steam engine construction project at Cowie and Eriksson, a local engineering company. After two years, he moved to Helsinki to work for Fiskars, but because of the Crimean War he was arrested due to his nationality and transferred to Saint Petersburg. He was soon released with help from family connections and he remained working for Izhorsk Works for eight years.

In 1862, Crichton returned to Turku after receiving an offer to buy half of Cowie & Eriksson Company. The company was renamed W:m Crichton & C:o and under Crichton's leadership it developed into the largest company in Turku. The company built predominantly ships and steam engines and its main customer was the Imperial Russian Navy.

Crichton led the company until his death in 1889. He was survived by twelve children who soon sold the company to investors. Crichton's name remained in use until 1965.

== Early life ==
Crichton was born in Leith, Scotland. His father George Crichton was a shipowner, whose company became one of the first steam ship companies in Scotland. Its ships operated between Leith and London. Crichton's mother, née Allan, was also from Leith; her father was a log dealer, whaler and shipowner. He had four brothers and one sister. His older brothers Alexander and Edward studied at the Royal Naval College, Greenwich and were then employed by Scottish engineering companies. The example set by his older brothers inspired Crichton. He studied in Leith until he was ten years old, after which he went on to Hill Street Institution, Edinburgh where he graduated at the age of 14. His father died in 1841. Crichton followed his brother Alexander to Greenock, where he worked as an intern at Scotts Shipbuilding and Engineering Company. After two years he moved to Shotts Iron Company where his brother Edward worked. When this engineering works was closed, Crichton moved to Glasgow where he worked for Robert Napier and Sons as a draftsman. In 1848 he went to sea to work as an engineer on SS Royal Victoria, which operated between London and Granton. During the winter season he studied, and in the following year he worked on SS Isabella Napier. While his brothers Alexander and Edward often worked at different occupations, Crichton's interest was focused on designing and drafting.

== First years in Turku ==
In the summer of 1850 Crichton received a letter from the Finnish engineering company Cowie and Eriksson offering him a position as supervisor on a three-year contract. It is not known how the company found him. 23-year-old Crichton jumped at the opportunity since he had planned for a long time to move to Russia, where his granduncle Sir Alexander Crichton and cousin Sir William Crichton had already made their careers. Imperial Russia, which was developing its merchant shipping fleet, had attracted many British specialists since the 18th century, and the British population in Saint Petersburg was in the thousands. Many of them were in high positions and members of the upper class. Although the offer did not come from Saint Petersburg, but the smaller city of Turku in southwestern Finland with a population of 13,000, Crichton probably saw it as an opportunity to gain a toehold in Russia.

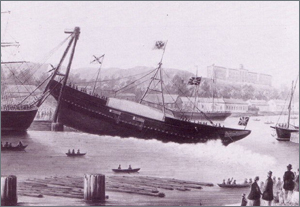
Launch of the Imperial Russian steam frigate Rurik at Turku Old Shipyard.

Crichton was engaged to lead a project to construct a steam engine that was to be mounted on the steam frigate Rurik, the biggest ship built in Finland to date. The yard, Gamla Warfsbolaget i Åbo, ("old shipbuilding company in Turku"), was the most important customer of Cowie & Eriksson. They were located close to each other on the opposite banks of the Aura River. Crichton did not like the heavy work which was hampered by poor tools. Moreover, the company owners David Cowie and Anders Thalus Eriksson did not get along. When Crichton fell seriously ill, Cowie's wife took care of him. He got to know her brother, Samuel Owen Jr., the son of engineer Samuel Owen, who had played an important role in industrialising Sweden. Owen Jr. had moved to Turku a few years earlier to lead the same project Crichton was working on and lodged at his sister's home. After recovering in spring or early summer 1851, Crichton left for a holiday in Sweden where he met Mr. Fletcher a relative of Mrs. Owen. Fletcher introduced him to Motala Verkstad, the most significant Swedish steam engine producer. Crichton also met Owen's oldest daughter Annie Elizabeth and was smitten by her. When Owen's wife and four children moved to Turku in 1852, they met each other again and became engaged the following year. Their intention was to marry after the shipbuilding project was completed.

== Project in Helsinki, arrest and transfer to Saint Petersburg ==
Crichton signed a new contract with Fiskars which planned to open a facility in Helsinki. He travelled to England in the autumn of 1853 to purchase the needed machinery, and returned in January 1854 to oversee its installation in Hakaniemi. But global politics interfered with the project. The United Kingdom and France entered the Crimean War against Russia on 28 March. The war made importing machinery impossible and, as a British citizen, Crichton decided to return to the UK to wait until the war ended. The same evening he went to pick up his passport, military and Finnish police waited for him, told him to collect his drawings and notes, and ordered him to leave for Saint Petersburg with the papers, which travelled with him, in a sealed envelope. He was escorted by an officer and a policeman. When Crichton arrived in the city he was treated well but was not allowed to leave the arrest room. After spending few days under arrest, he asked for permission to talk to the department leader. When Crichton asked if they had found anything sensitive in his papers the answer was negative, but he was told that he was going to be sent to Moscow. Crichton mentioned his granduncle Sir William Crichton, who had worked before as a doctor for Grand Duke Nicholas, before he had become Emperor Nicholas I. The department leader answered that this might change the decision and advised him that the case would be investigated. As a result, Crichton was released and sent just twenty miles away from the city to Sir William Crichton who welcomed him warmly. Crichton spent two months with his granduncle during which time he met General Alexander Wilson, who was managing the state-owned Alexandrosk factory and Izhorsk Works in Kolpino. Wilson hired Crichton as chief engineer in Kolpino. Soon after he also organised a place for Samuel Owen who had had to leave the Rurik project after the outbreak of the war; Owen moved to Kolpino with his family.

Crichton had finally achieved his dream: a good position in a state-owned engineering company.

== Kolpino years ==
William Crichton and Annie Elizabeth Owen were married in the English church in Saint Petersburg in November 1854. The family grew during the following years with the birth of their daughter Louisa in 1856, followed by sons George in 1858, William Jr. in 1860, and Alexander Owen in 1862.

Crichton did not leave notes about his role in the Izhorsk Works, but some conclusions can be drawn from the order books, Crichton's specialisation, and a few other pieces of information. Following defeat in the Crimean War, the Russian Navy ordered new armoured ships with cannon turrets, powered by steam engines which used propellers; the minimum speed requirement was 15 knots. This required very powerful steam engines, with high-pressure boilers, representing the latest technology. It is noteworthy, that the second child George was born in Edinburgh, Scotland. This indicates that Crichton had been there for some length of time since he had taken his family with him. A third important fact is that Crichton was awarded the Great Golden Medal with Stanislaus ribbons around 1860; this was a significant award.

It appears that Crichton had travelled to the UK to gather information about the latest steam technology, which he could do relatively easily as a UK citizen using his existing contacts. Further speculation suggests the technology was successfully applied to the powerful engines built in Izhorsk and this was the reason Crichton received the award.

== Return to Turku ==
In 1862 Crichton received a letter from local businessman Erik Julin of Turku. He advised Crichton that he had bought Anders Thalus Eriksson's shares in Cowie & Eriksson and that David Cowie was ready to sell his. Julin was seeking a capable business partner who would run the company with him and suggested to Crichton that he purchase Cowie's shares. After a lengthy discussions Crichton bought the other half of the company from Cowie for 32,810 silver roubles.

== W:m Crichton & C:o ==
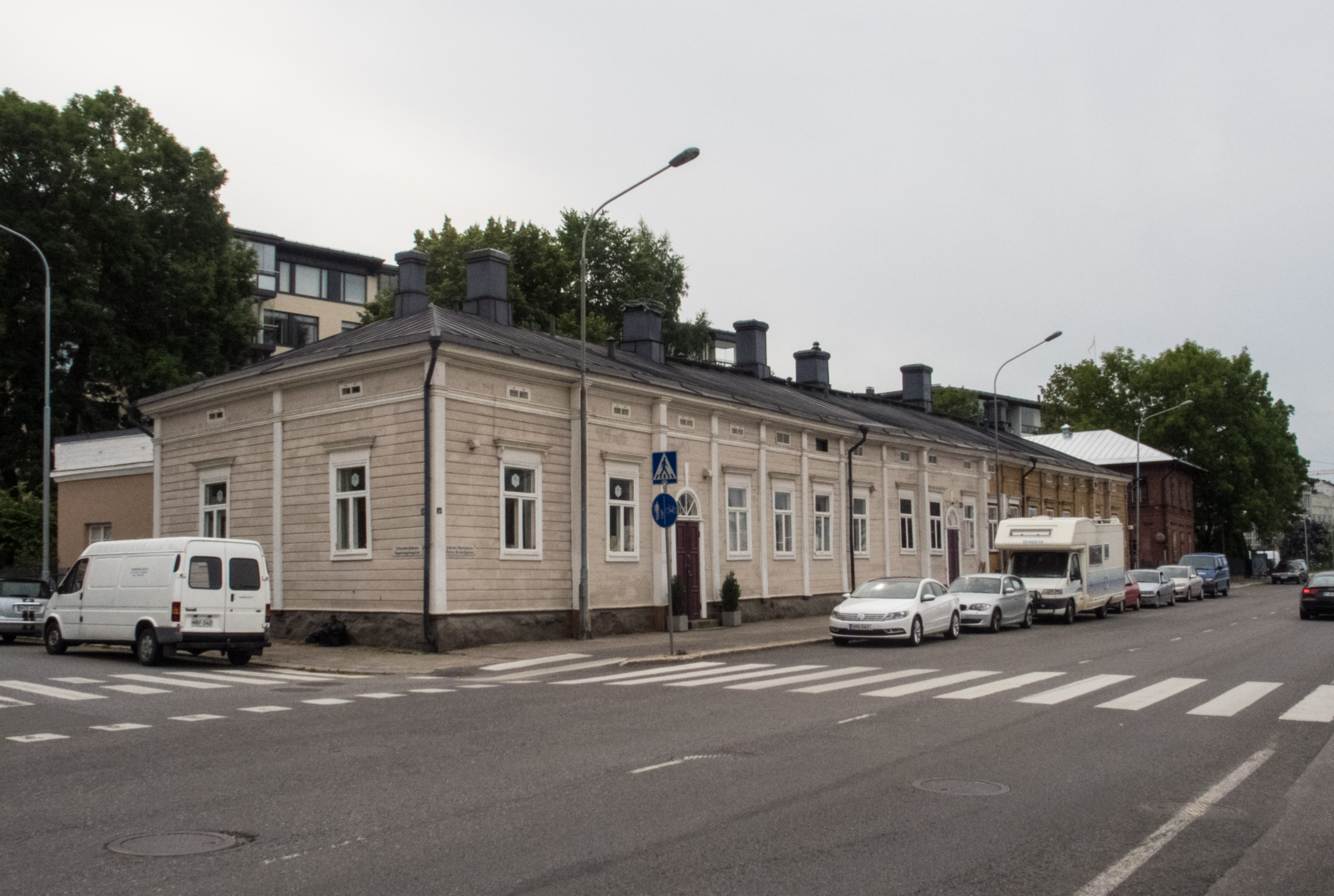
House in which Crichton lived with his family in Turku.

The company was now renamed W:m Crichton & C:o and Crichton became the managing director. The family moved into a wooden house located at Itäinen Rantakatu 56, next to the factory and the Aura River.

Crichton, now age 35, had now become owner and manager of a company where he could use his abilities. He enlarged the company portfolio to include steam ships and he built a new ship cradle by the river in 1864; a few years later he built a larger one next to the original. He replaced old machinery with modern equipment which was most likely purchased from the UK. The Foundry was enlarged and new workshops were built. As the company still built wooden ships, Crichton invested in a steam-powered sawmill that was located next to the river downstream from the other buildings. In the meantime, the Turku Old Shipyard on the other side of the river built the largest shipbuilding cradle in Finland.

The 1850s, 1860s and 1870s was a period of rapid development and economic deregulation. The Companies Act as well as the Banking Act were laid down in 1864 and, at the same time, Finland introduced its own currency, the Finnish mark. Customs duties were reduced, and a railway network started to develop. The Estates were called in 1863 and were soon followed by municipal administration reform. Despite setbacks, such as the famine of 1866–68, the atmosphere was positive: Finns were looking ahead and wanted to develop their country.

W:m Crichton & C:o had a steady flow of orders and the company continued to grow. Crichton had good contacts in Saint Petersburg; about twenty per cent of the company's orders came from Finland, the rest came from the Russian military and civil customers. Crichton kept his British citizenship and, soon after settling down in Turku, he was appointed Her Majesty's Vice Consul in Turku and Åland. During the Kolpino years he had learned to speak Russian and in Turku he used Swedish, which was widely spoken then.

Due to the financial risk caused by the growing size and value of ships, Crichton and Julin decided to secure their personal property by changing the company's legal status to a limited company in 1874. Julin died in the same year, after which a trading house operated by his son John Julin became owner.

During subsequent years the Russian military became W:m Crichton & C:o's most important customer. A major development was an order for six torpedo boats which were delivered in 1878.

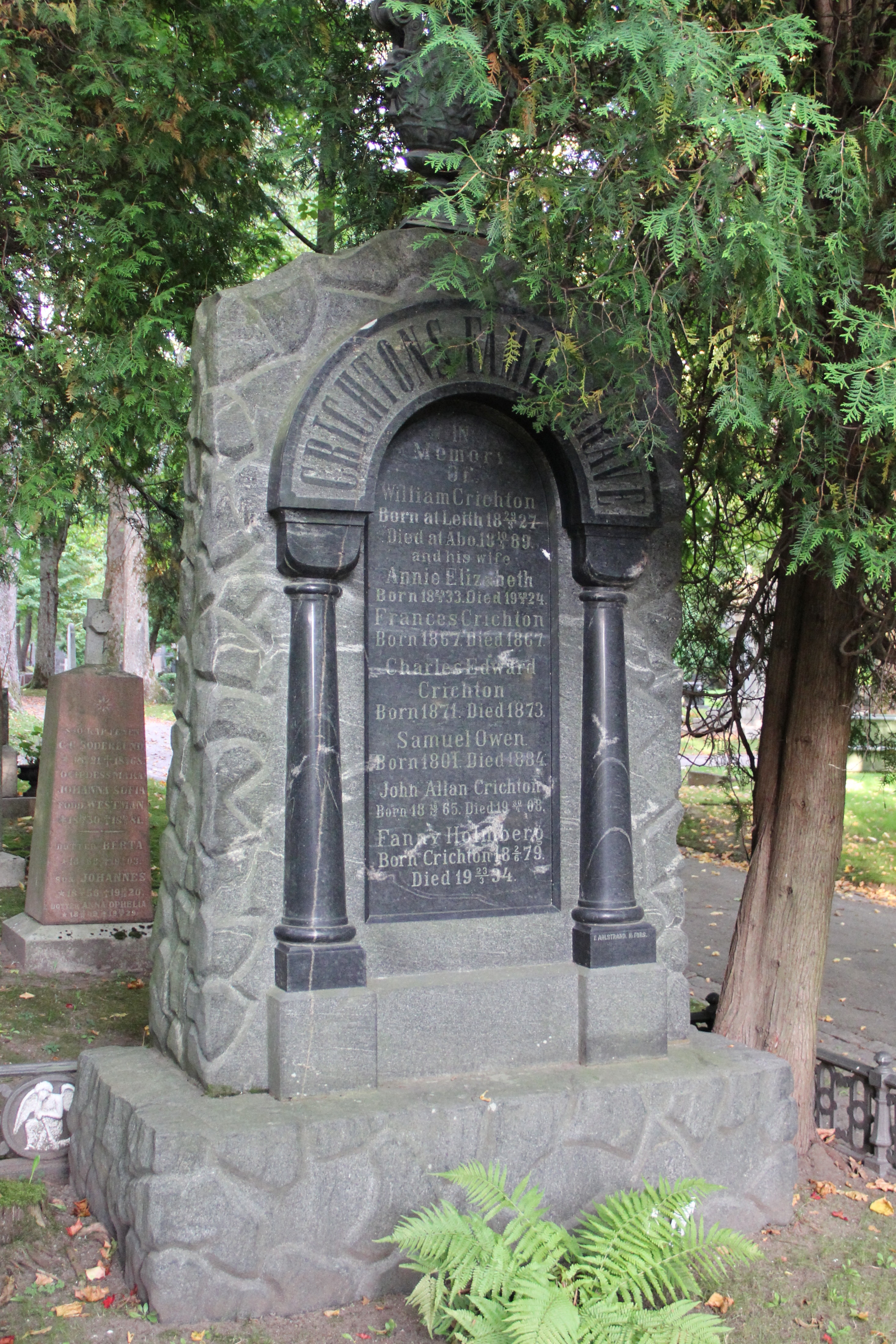
Crichton family grave in Turku.

It was unusual that a small company like W:m Crichton & C:o could compete against the large Saint Petersburg shipyards for navy orders. The military's purchasing process, and those of other public institutions, was complex and a successful business required both strong credibility and the right contacts. Evidently, the connections Crichton had made in Kolpino helped him, but to obtain orders he had to give something in return, which meant corruption. Moreover, Crichton presumably collected information about the latest technology during his journeys to the UK and passed it along to the Russian Navy. In 1877 he was awarded the Order of Saint Stanislaus. In 1883 he took over the nearby Turku Old Shipyard but it is unclear how he was able to finance this acquisition. The time fits with the Russian decision to build a torpedo boat fleet, so perhaps Crichton travelled to the UK in the mid-1870s to gather knowledge about torpedo boat technology. Another peculiar detail is that when the Russian Navy ordered 100 torpedo boats, mainly from the navy yards, six of them were ordered from Crichton, which was the only privately owned shipbuilder involved in this order.

During the late 1870s Crichton met the Welsh-born engineer John Eager in Saint Petersburg, whom he recruited to his own company. Eager's specialty was fast vessels, such as torpedo boats. During the following years W:m Crichton & C:o built a number of relatively small fast vessels, which were built in two large wooden sheds the company erected on the former premises of the Old Shipyard. Also larger vessels were built, such as two oil tankers for the Caspian Sea and the gun boat Bobr which was ordered for the Russian Pacific Fleet.

With the takeover of the Old Shipyard, W:m Crichton & C:o became the largest company in Turku with 936 employees and 1,589,000 marks turnover. During the time of William Crichton's death in April 1889, the company had a numerous orders. John Eager was appointed company manager. None of Crichton's twelve children were interested in continuing the business and his shares were sold to investors.

Crichton's name remained in use by the Turku shipbuilding industry until 1965 with the name of his company as well as by the Ab Crichton and Crichton-Vulcan companies.
