= Furst Menschikoff =

Several Finnish ships have been named Furst Menschikoff after Alexander Sergeyevich Menshikov, Governor-General of Finland.

- Furst Menschikoff was the first sea-going passenger steam ship in Finland. She sailed on a route between Saint Petersburg, Tallinn (Reval), Helsinki (Helsingfors), Turku, (Åbo) and Stockholm. sharing the route with the Storfursten. The 35 meter ship started traffic in 1837. The ship was designed by the Swedish shipwright von Sydow and built in Turku. Her 90 horsepower (67 kW) steam engine was built by Motala Verkstad.
- Furst Menschikoff (II) was built in Turku in 1850. She too was a paddle steamer with a 100 horsepower (75 kW) engine.
- A cargo ship by the same name was launched in 1834 In 1845 she was carrying tar between Kokkola and London. A Furst Menschikoff from Turku was lost at sea in 1867 outside Prussia.
