= Dahlström (surname) =

Dahlström or Dahlstrom is a Swedish surname. The Norwegian version is Dahlstrøm. It derives from the Swedish/Norwegian words dal, which means valley and ström/strøm, which means stream.

People with the surname include:

- Alexandra Dahlström (born 1984), Swedish actress
- André Dahlström (born 1991), Swedish e-sports player
- Andreas Dahlström (born 1991), Swedish ice hockey player
- Annica Dahlström (born 1941), Swedish neuroscientist
- Anton Dahlström (born 1990), Swedish footballer
- Carl Dahlström (born 1995), Swedish ice hockey player
- Carl Magnus Dahlström (1805–1875), Finnish merchant and industrialist
- Cully Dahlstrom (1912–1998), American ice hockey player
- Daniel O. Dahlstrom (born 1948), American philosopher
- Donald A. Dahlstrom (1920–2004), American chemical engineer
- Emma Dahlström (born 1992), Swedish skier
- Erik Dahlström (1894–1953), Swedish footballer
- Ernst Dahlström (1846–1924), Finnish businessman and philanthropist
- Fredrik Dahlström (born 1971), Swedish footballer
- Gus Dahlström (1906–1989), Swedish actor
- Gyula Dahlström (1834–1907), Slovak entomologist
- Harald Dahlstrøm (born 1961), Norwegian musician
- John Dahlström (born 1997), Swedish ice hockey player
- Magnus Dahlström (1859–1924), Finnish businessman and philanthropist
- Malin Dahlström (born 1989), Swedish pole vaulter
- Nancy Dahlstrom (born 1957), American politician
- Ole Eskild Dahlstrøm (born 1970), Norwegian ice hockey player
- Patti Dahlstrom, American singer
- Robert Dahlstrom (born ca. 1958), American business theorist
- Robin Dahlstrøm (born 1988), Norwegian ice hockey player
- Sebastian Dahlström (born 1996), Finnish footballer
- W. Grant Dahlstrom (1922–2006), American psychologist

== See also ==
- Dalström
