= Andrée & Rosenqvist =

Boat building yard and engineering works in Turku, Finland

Oy Andrée & Rosenqvist Ab (Oy Andros Ab)
- Trade name: Andros
- Company type: osakeyhtiö
- Founded: Turku, Grand Duchy of Finland, 1906
- Founder: Carl Severin Andrée and Gustaf Allan Rosenqvist
- Defunct: 31 December 1939
- Successor: Wärtsilä Crichton-Vulcan
- Products: motorboats, boat engines

Oy Andrée & Rosenqvist Ab (shorter form Oy Andros Ab) was a boat building yard and engineering works in Turku, Finland in 1906–1939. The company was known for its fast and high-quality boats and also marine engines, which were also applied in stationary use.

In 1939 Andros was taken over by Wärtsilä which merged it to the neighbouring Crichton-Vulcan yard. The last Andros engines were produced in 1958.

== Foundation ==
The company was started by Carl Severin Andrée and Gustaf Allan Rosenqvist. Andrée was an engineer originally from Gothenburg, Sweden, and lived for a few years in USA before moving to Turku 1898. First he had worked for Turun Rauta-teollisuus Oy until 1905 and then he started selling boat engines in department store Wiklund. He was particularly interested in boats and engines. He bought the boat department with his brother-in-law, Gustaf Allan Rosenqvist, in 1906. Rosenqvist, born in Turku, was then just 21-year-old and he had a business degree.

== Expansion ==
The company started as an assembly shop. The boat hulls were purchased from other boatbuilders, such as Turun Veneveistämö, and they were equipped with American Fay & Bowen engines. The business developed rapidly, and already in 1907 the men bought a lot for larger premises in Aura riverside close to Korppolaismäki. They invested heavily on facilities; in 1909 the works covered a two-floor brickhouse with a forging shop, assembly shop, boiler room, wood drying room and galvanising shop. The boats were built in a large boathouse and launched on two slipways. The main building was for offices and material stock, which was in two floors total 1 270 m^{2}. The risk proved profitable; During the first two operating years the company produced 120 boats and sold 367 engines of different makes.

The boathouse burned down to its foundation on 24 April 1909 together with 15 ready boat hulls. A new shop was ready in the following autumn.

The company built also sailing boats, most of them being planned by Carl Andrée, but some of them were designed by well-known Finnish yacht designers, such as Gustaf Estlander.

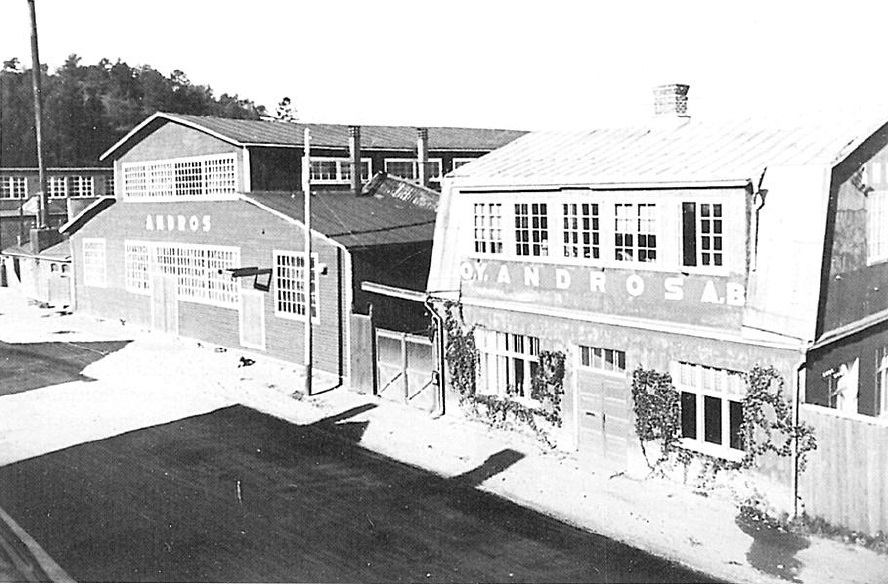
Andros buildings seen from Stålarm street side. The photo is taken most likely in the 1920s.

== Start of engine production ==
The annual production was about 50 boats which were propelled by imported engines. The company became limited company Osakeyhtiö Andrée & Rosenqvist in 1911. Andrée and Rosenqvist started producing own engines, which they had been planning for a long time before. A modern engine factory, following American example, was started in early 1912. The engine brand became Andros and the first year's production totalled 31 pieces. Until 1918 two types of Andros engines were produced: heavy types, which run 400–800 1/min, were used on fishing boats and lighter ones on sportboats.

== First World War ==
After the outbreak of the First World War in 1914 the Imperial Russian Navy needed urgently steam and combustion engine propelled cutters. In order to cope with the increased demand, in particular the Russian order, the company built a modern workshop in Uittamo. The older yard got a foundry, sheet metal workshops and other investments. Although the company didn't build steam engines it got an order for eight steam cutters, to be delivered between April and July in the following year. The ships including their engines were produced as subcontracting at the nearby Crichton yard. The largest order of the Russian Navy, 24 motor cutters of 18 metres long, came most likely in early 1916. The vessels were not handed over before the February Revolution. It is assumed that Andrée & Rosenqvist received the first quarter of the payment, but the remaining part never came. In 1918 the government of the newly independent Finland took possession of the Russian navy vessels, including 70 cutters of various sizes, of which 20 were handed over to Soviet Russia after according to Tartu peace treaty. Presumably Andrée & Rosenqvist got just 250 000 marks from the Finnish government for the cutters ordered by Russia. The last bargains with Russia were almost deadly to the company, but it recovered fast after. The total number of cutters delivered to the Imperial Russian Navy during the war is not known.

Gustaf Allan Rosenqvist left the company in 1918, after which he bought company Oy Arwidson & Co. in Helsinki. Erik W. Ingman took his place as a Commercial Director. The Uittamo workshop was sold to a nail factory in 1920.

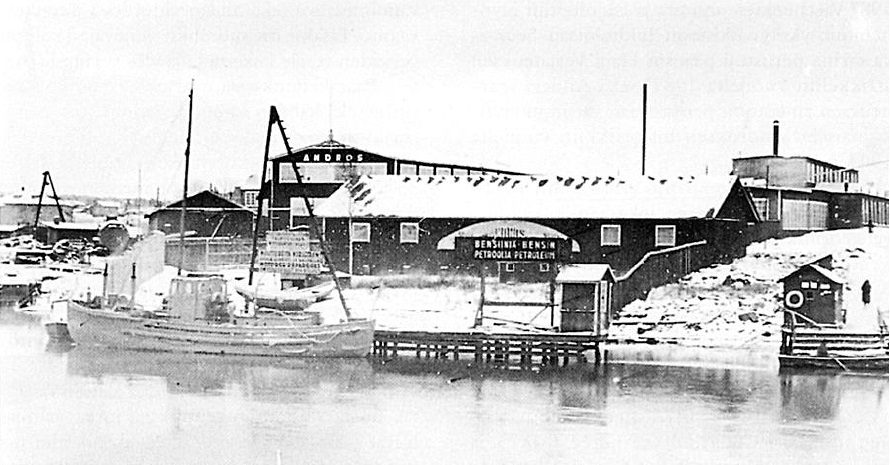
Andros buildings seen from Aura river in the 1920s.

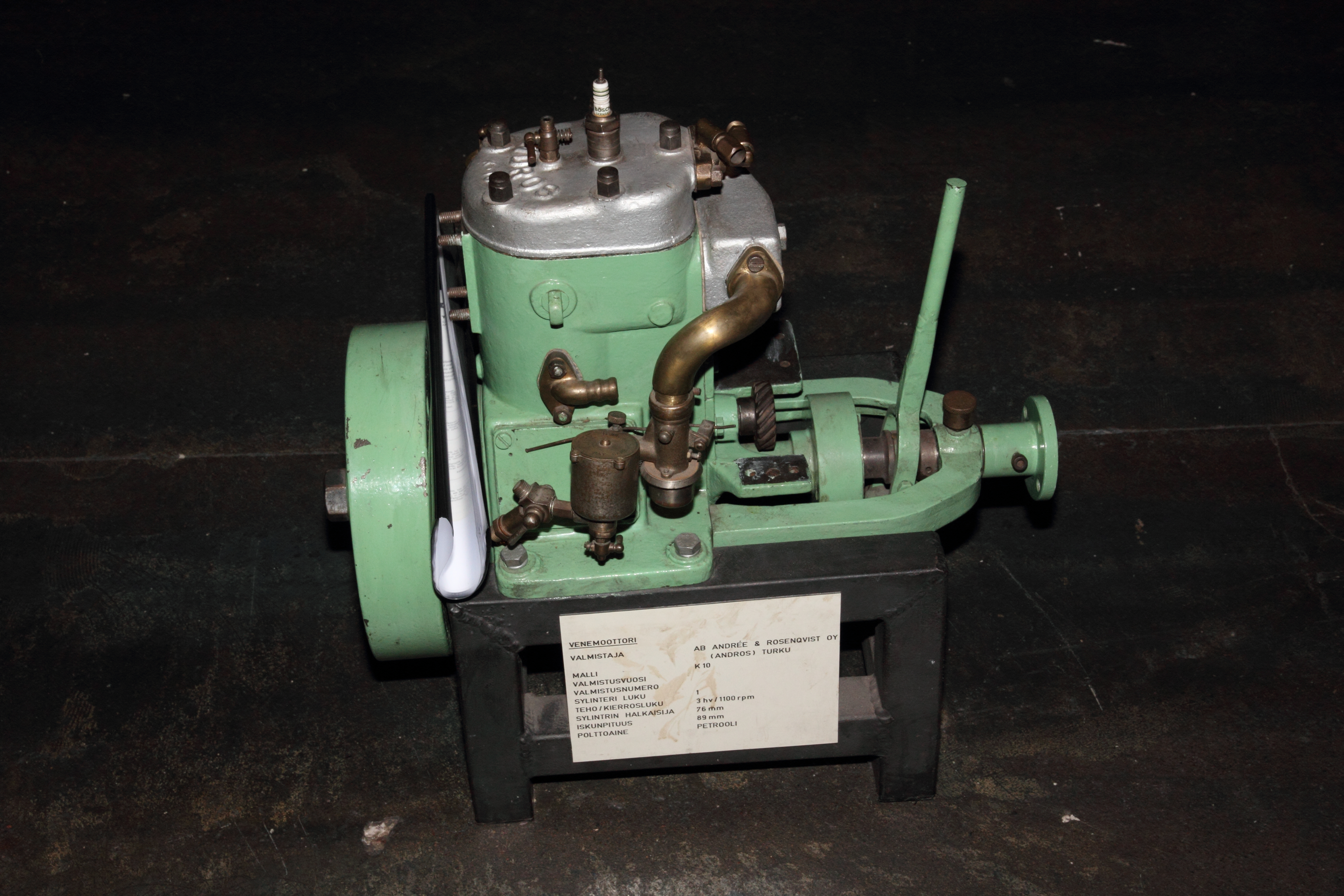
A single-cylinder Andros K10 engine.

== Golden era ==
In 1919 prohibition came into force in Finland. This led to excessive smuggling of alcohol from Estonia, Sweden, Poland and other countries, and therefore to a growing need of fast and high-quality boats, such as Andrée & Rosenqvist produced. Famous smugglers' names, such as Algoth Niska, are marked on the order books, but also the Finnish Customs bought several speedboats respectively.

In the same year a new set of engines was introduced. In 1920 the company sold seven large yachts and 27 motor boats. The yachts were powered by heavy duty Andros T engines, which ran 450 1/min and the smaller boats were equipped with light Andros L's, which ran at speed 800–1200 1/min. The number of personnel was 100 in the boat works and 100 in the engine shop.

The production of speedboats started to reduce gradually from 1923. In 1926 a new regulation limited the maximum speed of privately owned boats to 12 knots; having a faster boat needed a special permit. The orders of fast boats almost ceased. The prohibition was ended in 1932.

== Soviet exports ==
The company received significant orders from Soviet Union for Andros T engines in years 1925 and 1927. The engines were not only for marine use but they were used as power source for several other applications, such as pumps, compressors, generators, locomotives and motor ferries.

== 1930s ==
A new series of Andros engines was introduced soon after the deepest bottom of the 1930s recession was passed. The output was 10–60 hp at 1000 1/min. The cylinder configurations available were 1-, 2-, 3-, 4- and 6-cylinder options. The most famous ones were the single- and double-cylinder Andros L engines. The engine selection included ten models in 1935.

The son of C.S. Andrée, Åke Andrée, became the head of the company in 1931. C.S. Andrée died already in the following year just at age of 59. The commercial Director Erik W. Ingman bought half of the shares of C.S. Andrée. In the beginning of 1934 the company name was officially changed Ab Andros Oy. Åke Andrée sold 800 of his 1 367 shares to Wiklund family between 1936 and 1938, losing his controlling majority.

There were two shipyards in the neighbourhood of Andros. Crichton Yard was at the opposite side of the river and Vulcan right next to Andros. Crichton and Vulcan merged in 1920s creating Crichton-Vulcan, and grew heavily. One of the investments was a dry dock built in 1934–1936 at the other side of the Andros area, right next to Korppolaismäki, and Andros became surrounded by the shipbuilding giant. Andros gave Crichton-Vulcan a right for passage to the drydock through its area. In 1935 Crichton-Vulcan was taken over by Wärtsilä which expressed its interest on the area of Andros. The main owners and Wärtsilä reached an agreement and Andros was sold on 1 September 1939, the same day that the Second World War broke out. The company was formally discontinued at the end of the same year, when it was merged to Wärtsilä Crichton-Vulcan.

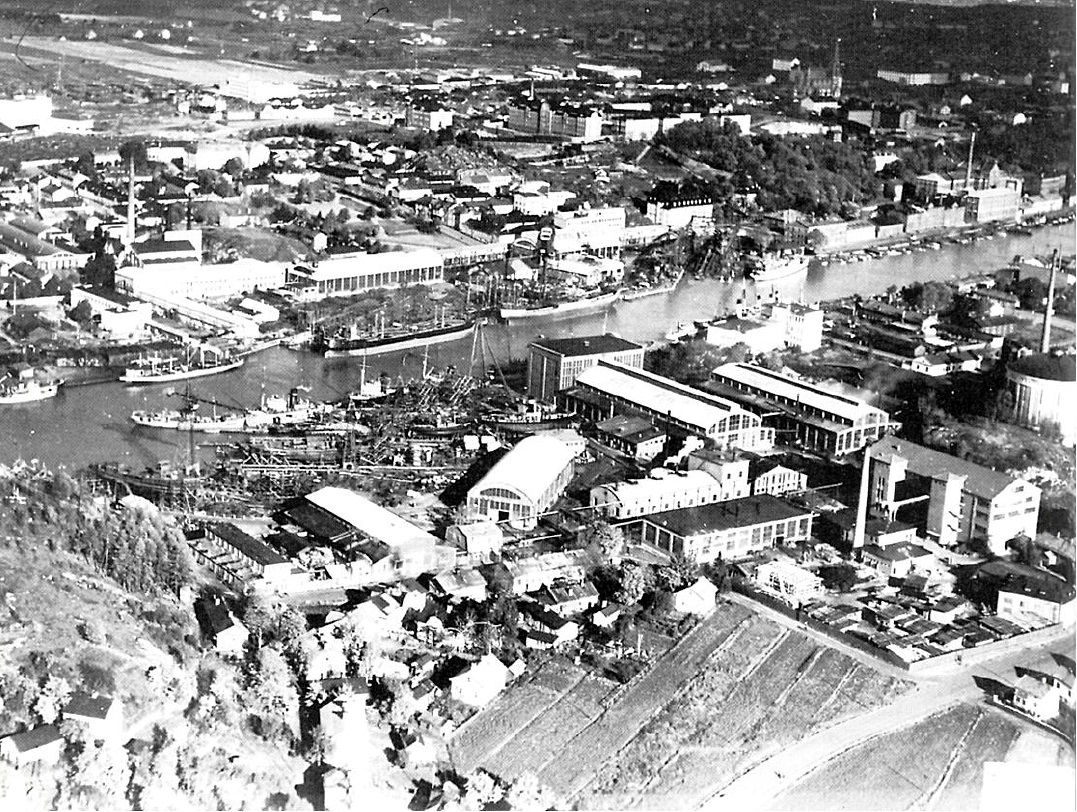
Wärtsilä Crichton-Vulcan in 1948. The former Andros buildings are on the row left side foreground, between the docks and small houses.

== Later history ==
As of 1939 Andros had produced total 3 800 engines. Wärtsilä Crichton-Vulcan continued the production with parts made in stock until the last engine, serial number 4 409, was produced in 1958. Many of the engines were used to power rescue boats built for ships exported to Soviet Union. The Andros buildings remained in use until their demolition in the 1960s. On the same place was later built the Wärtsilä Turku Factory main assembly hall, where Wärtsilä medium-speed diesels were produced.

Andros was later nearly forgotten, until Swedish Hans Værnéus and his son Anders started to investigate the history of an Andrée & Rosenqvist made boat that had been in the family for decades. In 1987 the investigation lead to Wärtsilä Turku shipyard files where they found the Andros archive that had been thought to be destroyed in fire in 1939. Hans Værnéus wrote a history book about Andros by using the archive that was transferred to Stockholm. The archive was kept in the Museihusets Motorbåtmuseum where it was fully documented. The archive was returned to Finland to Forum Marinum and Turku Provincial Archive in 2011.

Few dozen Andros boats have survived.
