= Crichton (Turku shipyard) =

Finnish shipbuilding company

Aktiebolaget Crichton
- Formerly: C.M. Dahlström
- Type: osakeyhtiö
- Industry: engineering; shipbuilding
- Predecessor: W:m Crichton & C:o Ab
- Founded: 6 June 1914 in Turku, Grand Duchy of Finland
- Founders: C.J. Dahlström; Ernst Dahlström; Magnus Dahlström
- Defunct: 18 August 1924
- Fate: merged with Ab Vulcan
- Successor: Ab Crichton-Vulcan Oy
- Headquarters: Turku, Grand Duchy of Finland (→5 December 1917); Republic of Finland (6 December 1917 →)
- Products: steam engines, ships and other engineering products
- Owners: Dahlström brothers (→ 1916); Emissions Ab (1916 →) other investors (1916 →)

Aktiebolaget Crichton was a shipbuilding and engineering company that operated in 1914–1924 in Turku, Finland. The main products were vessels, steam engines and combustion engines.

The company was founded in 1914 to continue shipbuilding operations of W:m Crichton & C:o which had bankrupted in the previous year.

It was merged to its neighbour and competitor Aktiebolaget Vulcan in 1924. The succeeding shipbuilding company Ab Crichton-Vulcan Oy grew the biggest shipbuilding company of Finland.

== Background ==
The preceding company was founded in 1842 as Cowie & Eriksson. At the beginning the main products were steam engines. The company was taken over by local businessman Erik Julin and Scottish William Crichton in 1862 and was named W:m Crichton & C:o, after which it extended to shipbuilding. The main customers came from Imperial Russia and the most significant one was the Imperial Russian Navy. After Crichton's death in 1889 the company was led by Englishman John Eager. At the end of the 19th century the main owners were Saint Petersburg investors and local businessmen, brothers Ernst and Magnus Dahlström.

In order to maintain its position in the Russian market, the company leased premises in Malaya Okhta, Saint Petersburg, in 1896 for building ships for the navy. Due to poor management, wrongly calculated prices and delay payments, the new branch caused such significant losses, that the whole company bankrupted in spring 1913.

== New start ==
W:m Crichton & C:o was officially filed for bankruptcy on 24 April 1913. The estate announced that the claims of trading house C. M. Dahlström, owned by the Dahlström brothers, reached over 4.5 million marks. Therefore, the Dahlström brothers took immediate actions to defend their assets. The Okhta yard was closed and in the following year its moveables were sold. At Turku yard only such property was sold which was not necessary for production. From summer 1913 the yard was operated under name C.J. Dahlström. In June 1914 a new company was started under name Aktiebolaget Crichton; the owners wanted to keep the reputable name. All questions about property were settled with the estate and Ab Crichton started free from debt. The share capital consisted of 2 000 shares, each of them having 1 000 marks value.

== Initial production ==
Ab Crichton hired Sten Harald Stenovich Lundsten, the former financial manager of the Okhta shipyard, to represent the company in Saint Petersburg. Later he got a broad mandate to sign sales contracts. Lundsten chased for orders to Ab Crichton in an environment of corruption and machination.

The economic situation was favourable for Ab Crichton. The Russian economy was in upswing and the newly founded shipbuilder received orders for 12 tugboats with 140-hp engine power for 1913–1914. Eleven orders came from Russia, one from nearby Korpo lime company. In addition, the company produced ten steam engines for Saint Petersburg customers. During the first year, the company employed already 400 people.

The most important customer of the preceding company, the Imperial Russian Navy, did not place any orders in 1914, although Europe was under threat of war. However, Ab Crichton got an order through detour for eight motor cutters for Nikolayev shipyard at Black Sea. The yard had outsourced the project to Turku Andrée & Rosenqvist company, which further outsourced it to Ab Crichton. The terms of the deal were strict regarding maximum weight and minimum speed, but Ab Crichton fulfilled the requirements of the 156 900 rubles deal. Probably the reason for the outsourcing was that Andrée & Rosenqvist did not have experience about steel hull vessels powered by a compound steam engine.

== First World War ==
The outburst of the First World War in August 1914 made all companies cautious and subsequently they reduced headcount drastically. Ab Crichton fired the whole personnel, but after the situation had stabilised within a few weeks, the company started hiring the workers back, albeit for a 20% lower salary. Also the weekly working hours were reduced from 56 to 40. The reduced salaries caused anger amongst the workers – they believed the previous dismissals being just an excuse for cutting down the wages.

In February 1915 Ab Crichton got an order for five 56-feet motor cutters. It is not known whether the order came directly from the Admiralty or again through one or more middlemen. Each vessel featured a 240-hp steam engine. The company did not get more orders for newbuildings later in the same year, but it got a significant project for reconditioning of four torpedo boats.

Ab Crichton got an order for four 162-feet steamers in February 1916. The customer is not known, but most likely it was the Admiralty, that used the boats later for patrolling in the Finnish archipelago. The order led to shortage of workforce, and in May Ab Crichton published an announcement on newspapers, that the company sought for numerous sheet metal workers. The total headcount reached 500 at the end of the year. During the same year the company delivered 14 steam engines, some boilers and pumps to Saint Petersburg. In October the company got two orders for vessels: the first one included two 40-feet motor cutters and the second one four 185-feet steamers. The future looked bright.

In August 1916 the Dahlström brothers sold the company to Helsinki-based Emissions Aktiebolaget. One third of the shares were transferred shortly after to a consortium formed by Freiherr Carolus Wrede and Ernst, Edgar and Berndt Grönblom. The rest of the shares were offered to public market. The new shareholders had a meeting in September 1916. Freiherr Carolus Wrede became the chairman, Ernst Grönblom was selected deputy chairman and the director of the board became Erik von Frenckell. The company manager became Freiherr Rabbe Wrede. the share capital was increased to six million marks, comprising 6,000 shares, each of 1,000 marks' value.

In order to answer the increased demand, the number of personnel was raised. At the end of 1916, the headcount reached its peak being 1,059 people. the following turbulent times reduced order intake and in 1917 the company employed only 705 people any more.

In January 1917 Ab Crichton got an order for two 162-feet steamers. They were similar to the four patrolling ships ordered in the previous year. But these six ships were cancelled, probably due to the February Revolution. After this, the yard had no orders in the same year, and the only note on the order book logged in November included a work order of four compound engines, which were produced to storage, most likely just for employment reasons. Finland became independent in the same December.

While many of the Finnish company managers ideologically supported the Finnish independence, the subsequent loss of the Russian market was disastrous to a number of Finnish engineering companies. Moreover, many companies lost their receivables during the Russian revolution and the nationalising of banks. Losses of Ab Crichton were altogether 1,283,018 marks.

In 1918 the company got just one order for a new ship which was a tugboat. Another one came for a steam engine. The most significant order was a repair project of SS Bore I, which employed 100 men until 1921. The previously started two 40-feet motor cutters were sold to the Imperial German Navy in 1918. The four patrol steamers were transferred to the state of Finland; two of them became gunboats Turunmaa and Karjala, and two others were sold to the Polish Navy in 1920. This helped the company to gain back a part of the receivables lost during the Russian revolution.

== Post-war recession ==
The early 1920s were difficult years for Ab Crichton. The company managed to sell some steam engines in Finland, but for a long time there were no orders for new ships. The very last ship order for Ab Crichton came on 29 February 1924 from city of Turku; the vessel was an icebreaker-tugboat with a 380-hp engine output.

== Merger ==
Discussions about merger between Ab Crichton and the neighbouring Ab Vulcan started already in the early 1920s. The initiative came most likely from Ab Vulcan, which was managed by Allan Staffans. The aim was creating a larger and financially stable company that could compete for the expected orders of the new Finnish Navy, which was at the beginning of creating itse own fleet. Ab Crichton appointed Carolus Wrede to manager position in 1922 to lead the negotiations. Articles for association for the new company were presented to the board of Ab Vulcan in December 1923. The merger was put into practice in winter 1924, and on 14 May 1924 the local newspaper Åbo Underrättelser reported, that the companies are merged and the new company Ab Crichton-Vulcan Oy is established. The merger too officially place in the constituent meeting on 18 August.

== Sources ==
- Grönros, Jarmo; Kujanen, Hannu; Priamursky, G.; Rinta-Tassi, Osmo; Saarinen, Jarmo; Teräs, Kari; Trofimov, S. (1996). Aurajoen rautakourat — Järnnävarna vid Aura Å (in Finnish and Swedish). Turku, Finland: Turun maakuntamuseo — Åbo landskapsmuseum. ISBN 951-595-020-1.
- von Knorring, Nils (1995). Aurajoen veistämöt ja telakat [Boat- and Shipyards along River Aura] (in Finnish). Espoo, Finland: Schildts Förlags Ab. ISBN 951-50-0735-6.
- Energiaa — kaksi vuosisataa voimakonevalmistusta Aurajoen rannoilla [Energy — two centuries of power unit production on the banks of Aura river] (in Finnish). Raisio. 2017. ISBN 978-952-93-9293-3.
