= Dahlström =

Dahlström, Dahlstrom or Dahlstrøm may refer to:

- Dahlström (surname), Swedish and Norwegian (Dahlstrøm) surname
- 13269 Dahlstrom, a minor planet
