= Föri =

Cable ferry in Turku, Finland

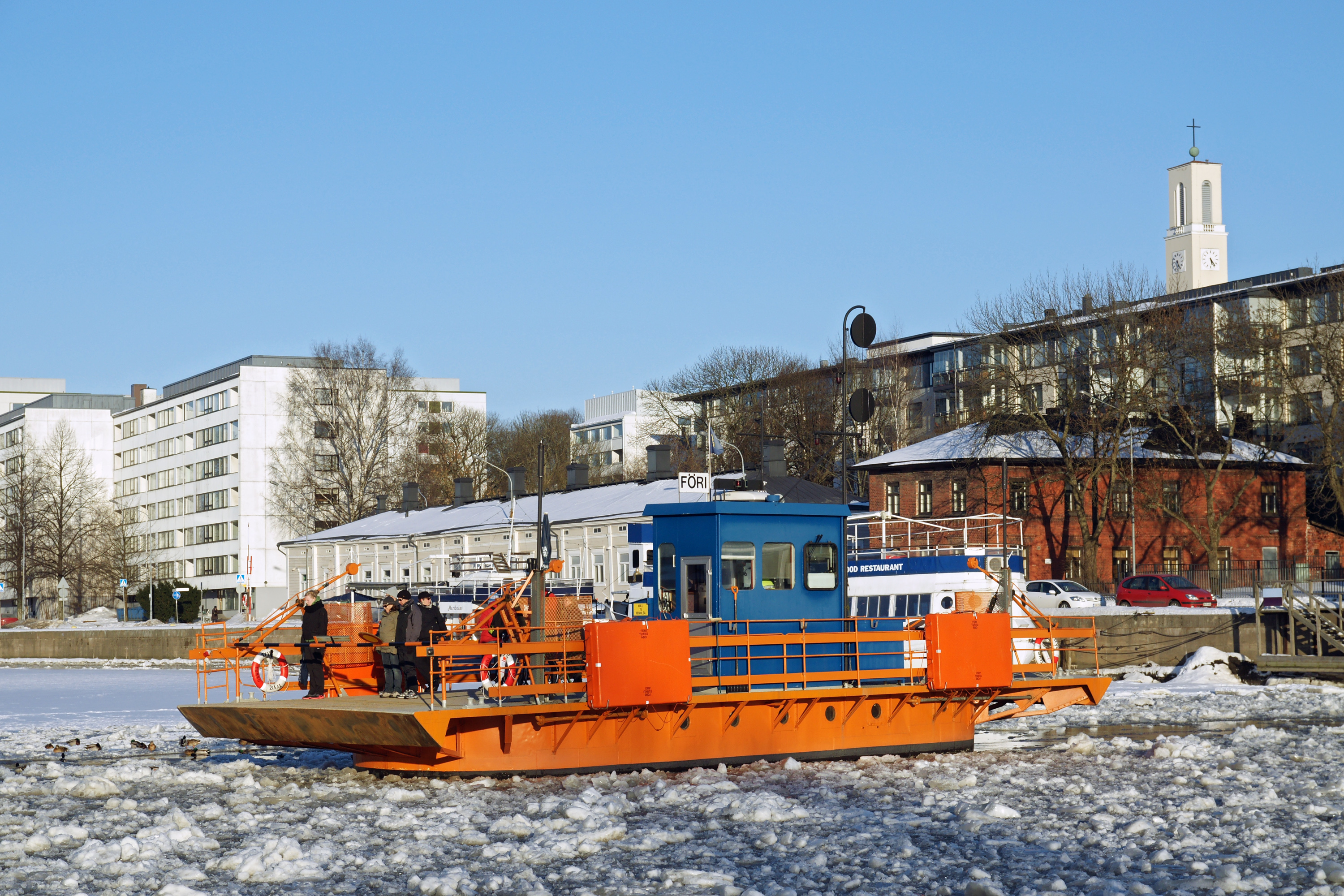
- Föri in Turku, Finland

History
- Name: Föri
- Owner: City of Turku
- Operator: Mobimar Oy
- Route: Tervahovinkatu–Wechterinkuja, 78 meters, 2 minutes.
- Builder: Ab Vulcan, Grand Duchy of Finland
- Completed: 1903
- Maiden voyage: 1904
- In service: 1904–Present
- Status: In service
- Notes: Oldest vehicle in daily operation in Finland.

General characteristics
- Type: Chain ferry
- Ramps: 2
- Installed power: 2 × Visedo Oy electric motor, ran on alternating days.
- Propulsion: Chain
- Capacity: 75 passengers
- Crew: 1

Föri is a cable ferry running across the River Aura in Turku, Finland. The ferry was completed in 1903, and it is the oldest vehicle still in daily operation in Finland. Föri is also the only municipally owned ferry in Finland. The name "Föri" is derived either from the Swedish word "färja", or from the English word "ferry".

If the river freezes over and the ice is thicker than 30 cm, the ferry is replaced by an ice bridge.

== History ==
Föri was built at the Ab Vulcan in 1903 to suit the needs of the employees at the Barker factory in Turku on the shore of the River Aura. The ferry was originally driven by steam engines fed from a woodfired boiler. In 1955 the steam engines were replaced by diesel engines, the crossing time was 1.5 minutes. The ferry was operated by the City of Turku till 2008, when the operation was outsourced to West Coast Seaservices.

In 2015 city authorities announced that the two diesel engines powering the Föri would be replaced by electric motors. The old engines consumed 7500–8000 litres of fuel each year, with the average speed of ~2 km/h. According to the manufacturer Visedo Oy, the new electric engines should consume around "three kilowatts of electricity per hour [sic] in summer and four in winter". The average speed will remain unchanged and the ferry will still have dual motors for redundancy. Each of the two engines consists of a DC/DC converter to increase the voltage from the batteries, and a permanent magnet motor drive to transform the electrical signal into mechanical energy. Both of the two motors can also be used simultaneously if more power is needed due to e.g. ice conditions. The new system is also eight tonnes lighter than the diesel engines and hydraulic motor it has replaced. This retrofit was done by Mobimar Oy, and it took place in the spring of 2017.
