= Dalström =

Dalström or Dalstrom is a surname. Notable people with the name include:

- Axel Hampus Dalström (1829–1882), Finnish architect
- Gustaf Dalstrom (1893–1971), American artist
- Kata Dalström (1858–1923), Swedish writer and political activist

== See also ==
- Dahlström (surname)
