= Lisa Eriksdotter =

Finnish preacher (b. 1733)

Elisabeth "Lisa" Eriksdotter (15 October 1733 in Kalanti - year of death unknown), was a Finnish preacher of the Rukoilevaisuus. Her religious visions and ecstasy contributed to the religious awakening movement in Finland, which became very active during the 18th century. This movement often centered on female visionaries, and Eriksdotter played a prominent role in it.

== Life ==
Lisa Eriksdotter was the daughter of farmer Erik Andersson and Liisa Jakobsdotter who lived in Kytämäki. In the fall of 1756, while tending her family's cattle, she was overcome by a vision of her sins and the impending judgement she would undergo. While her fear of not being redeemed from hell intensified, she experienced severe cramps. As word of her experience spread, a wave of fear circulated through the village and the surrounding parishes. This event contributed to the Great Awakening.

A number of legends feature Eriksdotter, but no accounts of her visions were recorded. Her life after she left her home parish of Kytämäki in 1759 is unknown.

A memorial to Eriksdotter was erected near her birthplace, and the site remains a place where religious followers gather.

== See also ==
- Evangelical Lutheran Church of Finland
