= Pyhämaa =

- Former municipality
- Pyhämaan kunta Pyhämaa kommun
- Coat of arms

- Location of Pyhämaa in Finland
- Coordinates: 60.9517319°N 21.3661943°E
- Country: Finland
- Province: Turku and Pori Province
- Region: Finland Proper
- Established: 1906
- Merged into Uusikaupunki: 1974

Area
  - Land: 73.6 km^{2} (28.4 sq mi)

Population (1973-12-31)
  - Total: 848

Pyhämaa is a village and a former municipality of Finland in the former Turku and Pori Province, now in the Finland Proper region. It was consolidated with the town of Uusikaupunki in 1974.

== Geography ==
The territory of Pyhämaa mainly consists of islands as well as former islands that have fused with the mainland due to post-glacial rebound. It is located in the Bothnian Sea.

The municipality bordered Uusikaupunki, Kalanti and Pyhäranta, before 1969 also Uudenkaupungin maalaiskunta.

=== Villages ===
- Edväinen (locally Erväne, Ärväine)
- Heinänen
- Kammela
- Ketteli
- Kuivarauma (Kuiviraumo)
- Kukainen
- Kursila
- Pitkäluoto
- Pyhämaa

== Name ==
Pyhämaa literally means "holy land". According to folk stories, the island was known as Pahamaa (evil land) as it was said to be inhabited by evil spirits, pirates and criminals until Isaacus Rothovius, bishop of Turku, ordered the establishment of a church in the 17th century.

According to Veikko Paasio, this story is a later invention and the island has never been called Pahamaa. He notes that many toponyms with the word pyhä have referred to remote locations, with the island of Pyhämaa being far away from the early population centers of Untamala (Laitila) and Kalanti. The word pyhämaa has also referred to a sacrificial grove. Still, the use of the word paha in Finnish toponyms is not unheard of, as Pyhäjärvi Ul has also been known as Pahajärvi.

=== Declension ===
In standard Finnish, only the word maa in the name is subject to declension (e.g. the genitive is Pyhämaan), but locally the word pyhä is also affected (e.g. the inessive is Pyhäsmaas, standard Pyhässämaassa).

== History ==
Municipal mergers of Uusikaupunki.

The first permanent settlers came to Pyhämaa in the 11th century.

Pyhämaa was initially a part of the Laitila parish. It was first mentioned in 1540 as Pyhema. Pyhämaa became a separate parish in 1639. The chapel community of Rohdainen was established in 1688, becoming the center of the parish in 1782. Pyhämaa was also called Pyhämaan Luoto at that time, while the main parish was called Pyhämaan Rohdainen. The areas of Kammela, Edväinen and Kukainen were transferred from Kalanti to Pyhämaan Luoto in 1863. Pyhämaa became separate again in 1908, while Rohdainen was renamed Pyhäranta, a name that was likely invented by the skipper Kustaa Aaltonen from the village of Hirslahti. Rohdainen is still the name of Pyhäranta's main village. Another part of Kalanti was transferred to Pyhämaa in 1942, including Raulio and Torlahti on the mainland.

The main island of Pyhämaa was connected to the mainland in 1891 after a bridge was built over the Katarauma strait.

In 1974, Pyhämaa was consolidated with Uusikaupunki as Neste Oy was planning to establish a refinery there. However, the refinery was never established.

== Churches ==
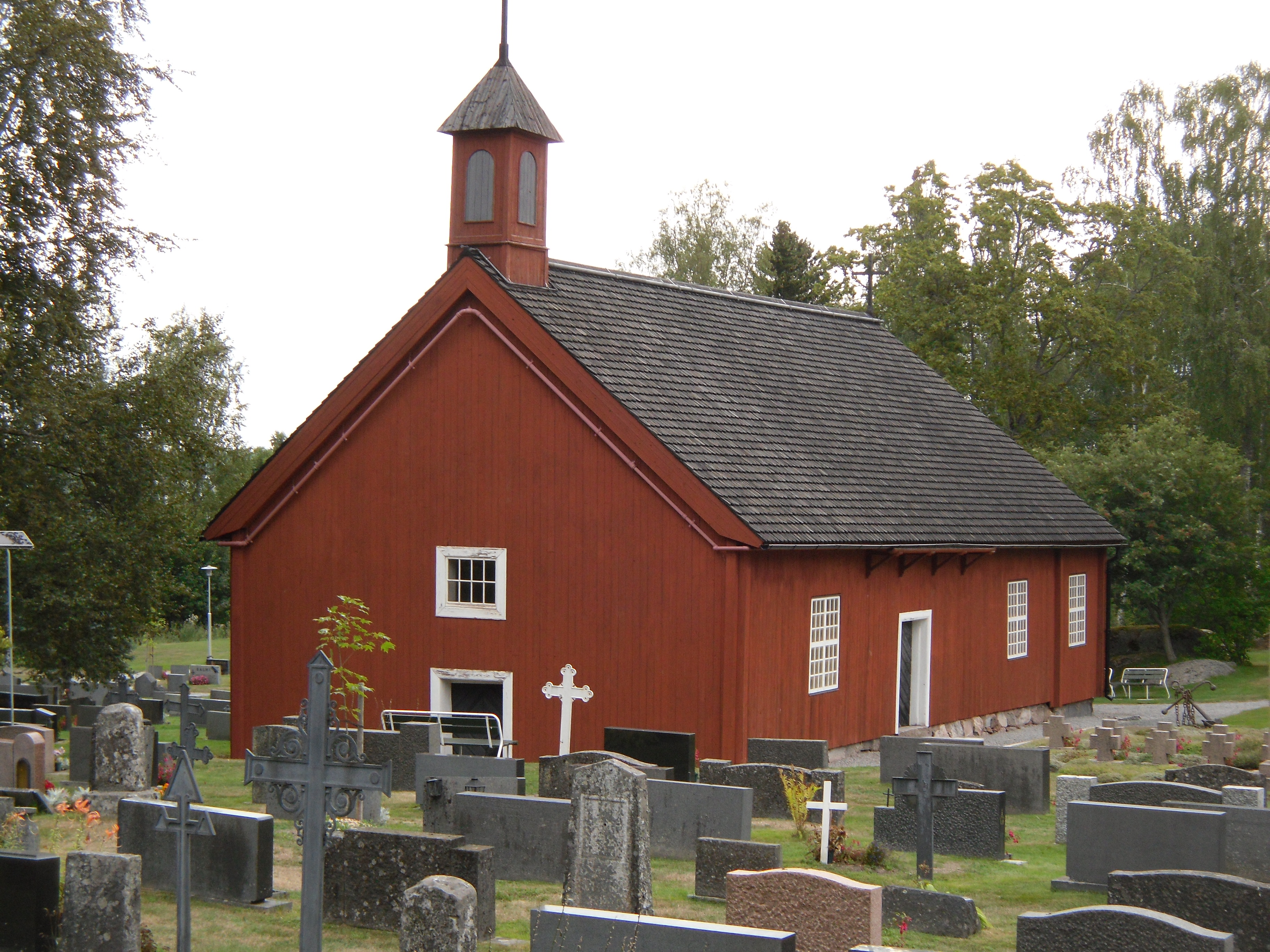

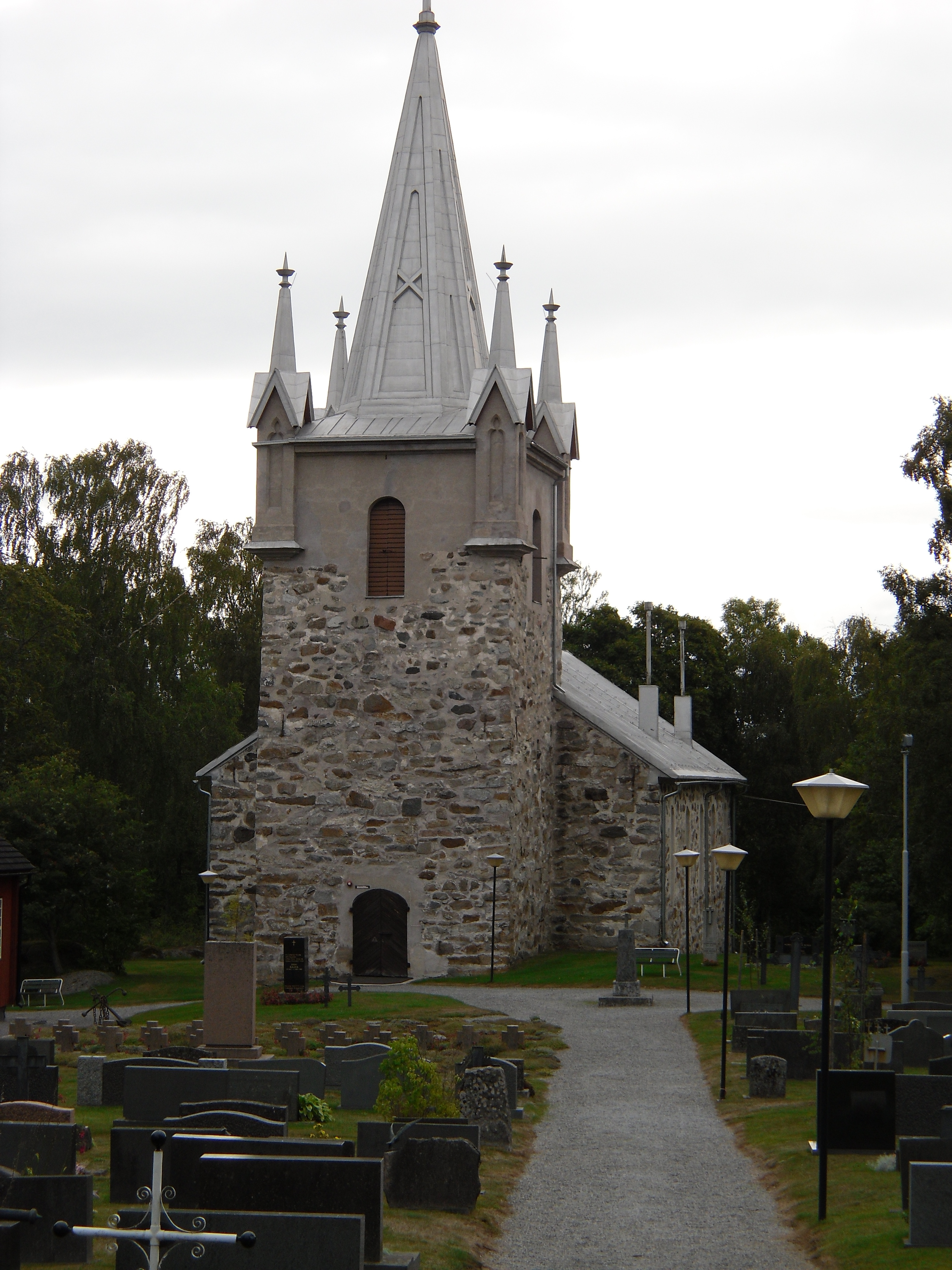

=== Early churches ===
The oldest confirmed church was likely built by Franciscan monks from Rauma fleeing the Reformation.

=== Old church ===
The old church, called uhrikirkko, was built in the 17th century. The inner walls have wall paintings, made by Christian Wilbrandt in 1667. After the new church was finished in 1804, the old church was used as a storage. The church was renovated in 1935 and has been in use again.

=== New church ===
The new church was built next to the old one in 1804 as the old church had fallen into disrepair. The modern shape of the church is the result of a renovation done in 1908, in which the top of the bell tower was changed.

== Services ==
=== School ===
Pyhämaa has a school for grades 1–6 (ala-aste), also including a preschool (esikoulu). In the school year 2022-2023, the school had 27 students.

=== Activities ===
Pamprinniemi in the northwestern part of Pyhämaa is maintained as a protected nature area by the parish of Pyhämaa. It contains a 4,5 km long nature path.
