= Allan Staffans =

vuorineuvos Allan Walfrid Staffans
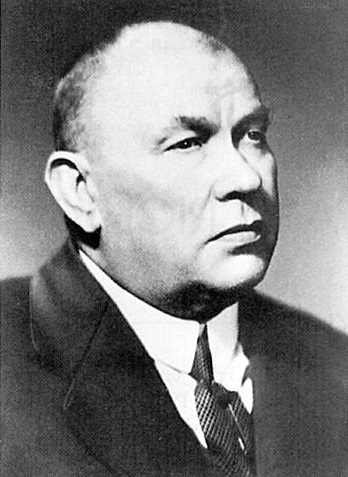
- Born: 13 February 1880; Nikolaistad (Vaasa), Grand Duchy of Finland
- Died: 19 October 1946 (aged 66); Turku, Finland
- Citizenship: Finland
- Education: technician
- Alma mater: Nikolaistad Industry College
- Occupation: General Manager
- Employer(s): Maskin o. Bro (1898–1918); Finnish Defence Forces (1918–1920); Ab Vulcan (1921–1924); Crichton-Vulcan (1924–1946) (1938 → Wärtsilä)
- Spouse: Selma Elisabeth née Kjellin
- Children: Margit, married Rusko (1904–1943); Gunvor, married Rosas (1910–1989)
- Parent(s): Matts Staffans and Amanda Maria Sofia née Törner
- Awards: vuorineuvos 1938; Cross of Liberty, 3rd Class

Manager of Vulcan
- In office 1921–1924

Company manager of Crichton-Vulcan
- In office 1924–1930
- Succeeded by: Robert Lavonius

Shipyard manager of Crichton-Vulcan
- In office 1930–1946

Allan Walfrid Staffans (13 February 1880 – 19 October 1946) was a Finnish technician, vuorineuvos and shipbuilder.

Staffans began his career at Maskin- och Brobyggnad (Maskin o. Bro) shipyard in Helsinki in 1898. Later he worked in shipbuilding industry in Siberia until World War I, when he returned to Finland. In 1918 he led an operation for eliminating of cannons in Sveaborg Fortress in Helsinki; the significance of the event has been later disputed by historians.

In 1920 Staffans was selected the manager of Vulcan shipyard in Turku. He organised a merger with its competitor Crichton creating Crichton-Vulcan shipyard, which grew under his leadership the most significant shipbuilding company of Finland. The yard built the most important vessels of the Finnish Navy, including submarines and two large coastal defence ships.

After World War II Staffans participated in negotiations of war reparations to Soviet Union.

Staffans had two daughters with his wife Selma Elisabeth née Kjellin.

== Studies and early career ==
Staffans was born in Nikolaistad, Grand Duchy of Finland, for sailor Matts Staffans and Amanda Maria Sofia née Törner. He first learned at folkschool and then graduated technician in mechanical engineering in Nikolaistad Industry School in 1898. By end of the 19th century the Nikolaistad shipbuilding industry, which once was a flourishing branch in the area, was almost disappeared. Staffans moved to Helsinki where he got a position at Maskin o. Bro shipyard. Staffans soon reached master's level in shipbuilding.

== Siberia years ==
In 1902 he was sent to work in Siberia to lead steam ship and dredging vessel building from materials transported from Finland. The parts were taken by rail to river Amur delta and then built in place. The primary customer was the Imperial Russian Navy, which joined the vessels to its Pacific fleet to mainly protect the traffic of the large rivers. Staffans travelled to far east total six times, some of the journeys he did with his family. The last journey Staffans did through Suez Canal and Indian Ocean, and he also stopped by in India, China and Japan. Staffans planned to leave for few years to study in Germany and UK in 1914 but outbreak of World War I changed his plans.

== Sveaborg sabotage ==
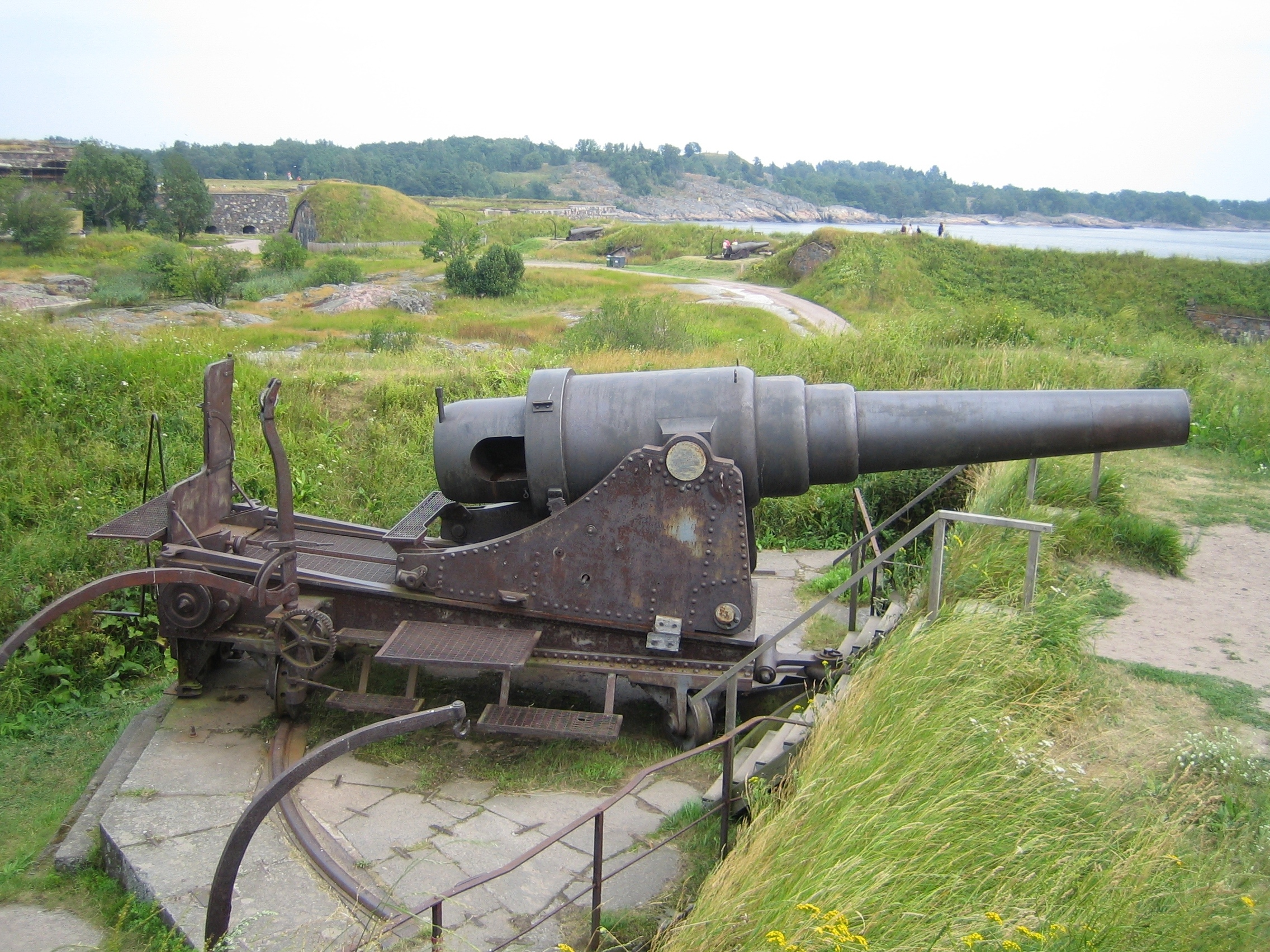
One of the Sveaborg cannons: 11 inch Pattern 1867 coastal gun.

After Finland declared independence the Finnish Civil War broke out in January 1918 and Helsinki was soon taken over by the Finnish Red Guards. The Sveaborg Fortress in front of Helsinki was still housed by the Russian soldiers and its cannons were seen as a threat against the Finnish White Guards.

Allan Staffans went to the fortress with some twenty men to dismount the locks of the cannons. The work started from the outer bastions and the main fortress followed after. The locks weighed hundreds of kilos were dismounted by use of winch hoists, packed into wooden caskets and stored in the warehouses of the batteries. The men moved on ice by feet and pulling the equipment on a sledge. The work was dangerous due to patrolling red guards, who reached over the cannons for their own use. The Russian soldiers were not always willing to accept the disarmament, but the good relationship Staffans had built with the Russian military during his work in Maskin o. Bro helped, although time to time the discussions were heated. The work was done by 15 March.

The White Guards got help from the German army which invaded in southern Finland in beginning of April. The Russian military handed Sveaborg over to the Finns on 14 April.

After the war the newspaper Hufvudstadsbladet published an article, according which Staffans had duped the Russian military personnel by typing himself an attorney letter fooling the fortress organisation up to the highest command. The operation was described as a "historic deed". As a memory of the event, there is a bust of Staffans in the fortress.

However, the Russian commander of artillery in Sveaborg colonel Balzam wrote a reply to a Russian speaking newspaper in Helsinki, that the operation was done under order of the commandant of the fortress and the directive of the Russian navy headquarters to ensure that none of the fighting parties would use the artillery against the city, and Staffans and his men were paid for their work by the Russian military.

Russia and Germany had agreed in the Brest-Litovsk peace treaty that the Russian Baltic fleet and coast fortresses would not get involved in military operations in Finland. It also came out afterwards that the Russian soldiers were not very interested in the mutual skirmishes of Finns. More information about the disputed event has been recently found from a 26 March 1918 dated report written by Oskar Gros who was a member in Staffans's team. The report tells that the work was done under supervision of Staffans and also consent with the Russian officers, who wanted to avoid that operative cannons had ended up to the hands of the Red Guards or German troops.

It is speculated, that a possible motive for exaggeration of the action was the Finnish White Guards' crave to get a part of the glory Helsinki conquest, which was mainly done by Germans.

After the war ended Staffans stayed serving the Finnish army in the fortress during years 1918–1920 under commandant office as the technical manager of the dry dock.

== Vulcan ==
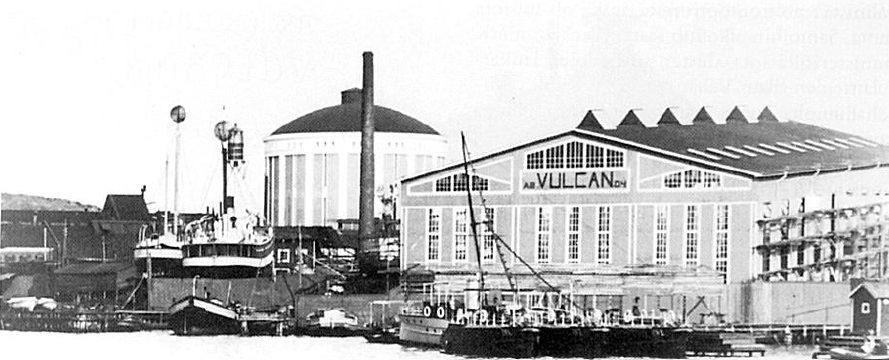
Vulcan shipyard and engineering works in Turku in the early 1920s.

Staffans was appointed general manager of Vulcan shipyard in Turku at the beginning of 1921. The company had got into financial trouble as the orders from the Russian navy had ceased, some of the deliveries had not been paid and the company had lost its property in Saint Petersburg. The company made heavy losses. Staffans was selected manager because of his experience, high expertise and leadership skills.

In 1922 Staffans negotiated with the state about repairing of an old Russian submarine. As the company had no experience about submarines, Staffans searched for contacts which had the technology. Although the project turned out to be hopeless, Staffans managed to get to know the Dutch company IvS, which was eager to start a submarine project with Vulcan. IvS was a German dummy company set up to maintain and develop the German submarine engineering expertise, when it was not allowed for Germany to build its own submarines. During 1922–1923 Staffans attended in committees which were planning an updated naval defence strategy for Finland. Vulcan and IvS signed a secret contract about co-operation for submarine engineering in November 1923. According to the contract, IvS promised to give all the needed engineering support in case Vulcan wants to build submarines. In the following month Staffans negotiated about a merger with a competitor, Crichton yard, which was located next to Vulcan, at the other side of the river Aura.

== Crichton-Vulcan ==
The merger of Crichton and Vulcan took place on 18 August 1924 and Staffans was chosen unanimously to lead the new, united Crichton-Vulcan yard. The yard got only few orders and Staffans put his hope on getting orders from the Finnish Navy. The naval defence strategy was ready in 1925 and included four submarines, two coastal defence ships and four torpedo boats. The ministry of defence sent inquiries for 22 companies for 400-ton and 100-ton submarines. Finally, Staffans's efforts were rewarded, when the state ordered first in 1926 one and then in 1927 two more 400-ton submarines from Crichton-Vulcan. Another order for a 100-ton submarine went to Hietalahti shipyard in Helsinki. The project schedules were delayed by months due to strikes in 1927. The submarines Vetehinen, Vesihiisi and Iku-Turso were launched between June 1930 and May 1931. IvS and Crichton-Vulcan made a secret agreement about one more submarine, CV-707, which Germans used for testing. The vessel stayed finally in the Finnish navy and was named Vesikko.

Simultaneously with the submarine projects, the yard worked already on two 3 800 ton coastal defence ship projects. Crichton-Vulcan signed contracts for the ships in November 1928. Building of such large and demanding ships required investments in facilities and cranes; also the number of employees was increased. The first one of the ships, Väinämöinen, was launched in December 1930 and Ilmarinen followed in July 1931.

The investments required capital and finally Crichton-Vulcan was sold to Maskin o. Bro, which had taken over previously the Hietalahti yard in Helsinki. The acquisition improved the company's financial basis and during the 1930s Crichton-Vulcan had grown the strongest and most modern shipyard of Finland under Staffans's leadership. The most important investments were a crane with a capacity of 100 tonnes and a dry dock.

During the 1930s Crichton-Vulcan managed to sell ships to Soviet Union. Staffans's excellent Russian language skills proved helpful in the negotiations. Contracts for total 29 ships to Soviet Union were signed; the orders were vital in the middle of the depression.

== Wärtsilä ==
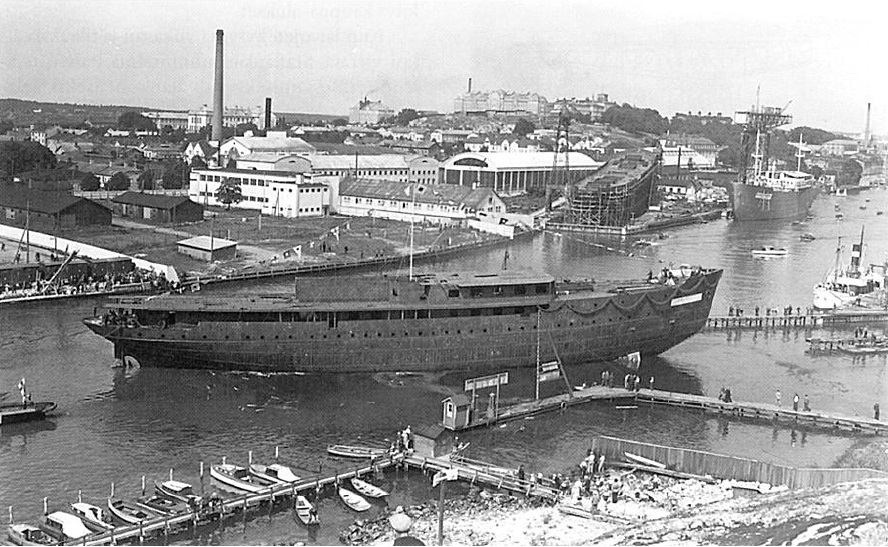
Launch of SS Bore II at Crichton-Vulcan in 1938.

The company got again a new owner when Wärtsilä took over Maskin o. Bro, including Crichton-Vulcan. The General Manager Wilhelm Wahlforss trusted and respected Staffans; in fact, Staffans was one of those few people who could disagree and argue openly with Wahlforss without being afraid of consequences. Wahlforss did not question his authority in Crichton-Vulcan and Staffans could continue his investment program.

Crichton-Vulcan got more demanding orders at the end of the 1930s; a big step was 2 000-dwt steam ship Rigel made for FÅA. This was followed by more modern and challenging projects; total 17 ships were ordered between January 1936 and September 1939. Staffans's right hand was the company's chief engineer Gösta Rusko, who was also his son-in-law.

The biggest investments of the late 1930s were the new office building "White House", foundry and large machine workshops. The latter ones were built especially for diesel engine production. By using his old contacts from ivS, Staffans made a licence production agreement with Krupp Germaniawerft AG in summer 1938. The engine production could be started only in summer 1941, when all the needed machines were in place, and finally just two Krupp engines were built. These were the first diesel engines of Wärtsilä.

== Second World War ==
When Winter War broke out in 1939, Turku was heavily bombed by the Soviet air forces, but Crichton-Vulcan avoided of large damages. When the peace came in 1940, Finland signed a new trading agreement with Soviet Union and soon Staffans and the Soviet Machinoimport signed a contract of four tug boats; this was followed by another order of 12 more slightly larger vessels of the same kind. No single vessel could be delivered before Finland was again in war with Soviet Union in summer 1941. However, Staffans found a new customer: he agreed delivering of the ships to German Kriegsmarine instead, and the yard got even few more orders for similar ships from Germany. In addition, Staffans signed contracts for cargo ships for Germany. Total 38 vessels were handed over to Germany before Finland got at war with Germany in September 1944. The yard suffered some damages in the Continual War.

== War reparations ==
After the war ended, Finland had to pay heavy war reparations to Soviet Union, which wanted the payment mainly in machinery. The largest and most demanding ships were assigned to Wärtsilä yards. Staffans was called together with Wahlforss and the Hietalahti yard manager August Jansson to negotiate about the ship types. Once again, Staffans's excellent knowledge about Russian language and Russian mentality proved helpful. The agreement about material list was signed in December 1944 by Andrei Zhdanov from the Allied Commission and the prime minister of Finland, J.K. Paasikivi.

Staffans was not involved into the war reparation industry as he fell ill and died in 1946. During his period the number of personnel at Crichton-Vulcan yard had grown from 300 up to 3 000.

== Personal life ==
In 1904 Staffans married Selma Elisabeth née Kjellin, who was from Helsinki. They got two daughters: Margit and Gunvor. Margit married later Gösta Rusko, the main engineer of Crichton-Vulcan. The younger daughter Gunvor was married to professor John Rosas.

Staffans was a vice consul for Netherlands in the 1930s.

In 1942 Staffans wrote a book called Skeppsbyggare och resenär i Östasien about his experiences in Siberia in the early 20th century.

Staffans faced two major personal losses in 1943 when first his closest colleague and son-in-law Gösta Rusko became seriously ill and perished in April. The widow and Staffans's daughter Margit Rusko died only two months later. Staffans and his wife took care of their two children after.

The family moved permanently to Turku in the early 1920s, but they also had a summer villa in Kirkkonummi. The villa had to be given to Soviet Union after the Continual War as a part of Porkkala lease area. When Soviet Union returned the area back to Finland in 1956, the widow Selma Staffans moved in, and despite her age, she participated eagerly in rebuilding the area.

== Bibliography ==
- Skeppsbyggare och resenär i Östasien, Förlaget Bro, 1942.

== Sources ==
- von Knorring, Nils (1995). Aurajoen veistämöt ja telakat (in Finnish). Espoo, Finland: Schildts Förlags Ab. ISBN 951-50-0735-6.
