= Ernst Dahlström =

Commercial Counsellor Ernst Abraham Dahlström
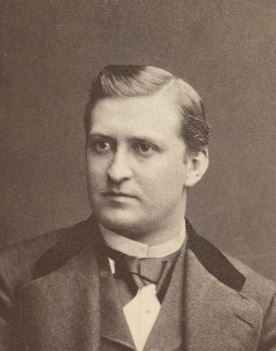
- Born: 26 March 1846; Turku, Grand Duchy of Finland
- Died: 16 January 1924 (aged 77); Turku, Finland
- Board member of: Akkas ångsågs Ab (1875–); Littois Ab (1875–); Åbo Sparbank (1881–); Aura Sockerbruks Bolag (1889–1900); Kymi Papermill (1889–1904); Kymin Oy (1904–); Finnish Marine Insurance Association (1890–1894); Åbo Aktiebank (1896–1920); Isbrytare Ab Avance (1901–1903); life insurance company Fennia (1905–); reinsurance company Verdandi (1905–); mutual insurance company Sampo (1907–1909); Ab Crichton (1914–); Wartsala ångsågs Ab; Ab Vulcan
- Spouse: Rosina Sofia née Julin
- Children: Carl-Johan (1876–1935); Greta (1877–1902); Erik Abraham (1879–1943)
- Parent(s): Carl Magnus Dahlström and Sofia Karolina née Kingelin
- Relatives: Magnus Dahlström (brother)
- Awards: Commercial Counsellor (1894); Commander of the White Rose of Finland, 2nd class

Manager of Kymi Papermill
- In office 1873–1904

Ernst Abraham Dahlström (26 March 1846 – 16 January 1924) was a Finnish businessman and philanthropist.

Dahlström inherited his father's position as manager of trading house C.M. Dahlström. His younger brother Magnus Dahlström joined in soon after. The brothers made significant donations to their home town Turku.

Dahlström worked as manager of Kymi Papermill in 1873–1904 and board member of the subsequent Kymin Oy. He developed the Finnish insurance sector and shipbuilding. Dahlström also had a significant role in development of Turku shipbuilding industry.

== Career ==
Dahlström studied in Behm German school in Viipuri and did his internship in Hackman & Co. in the same city. He returned in Turku in 1869 to work as bookkeeper in his father's company, trading house C.M. Dahlström. He got bourgeois rights in the following year.

In 1872 Dahlström took leadership of the trading house, after his father fell ill. The trading house had investments in industry and shipping, and under young Dahlström's leadership the trading house invested increasingly on industrial companies. His younger brother Magnus became a co-manager in 1881, after finishing his studies in Stuttgart. The brothers worked closely to each other and it is difficult to distinguish the originator of each project. Also their spouses were siblings: Ernst was married to 1853-born Rosina Sofia Julin in 1875; Magnus Dahlström married her younger sister Ellen Maria Julin. The father of the Julin sisters was consul John Julin.

In 1873 just 27-year-old Ernst Dahlström became the first manager of Kymi Papermill. Kymi papermill was the most important investment of the trading house. After the company merged with Voikkaa and Kuusankoski papermills in 1904, creating Kymin Oy, the trading house remained a major owner in the company and Dahlström continued as board member. The head office remained in Turku and a part of the time Dahlström worked at factory located in Kuusankoski.

Dahlström held management positions also in number of other companies, such as Akaa and Vartsala steam sawmills, Aura sugar factory, and Turku engineering and shipbuilding companies Åbo Mekaniska Verkstads, the subsequent Ab Vulcan and also W:m Crichton & C:o. He was a founding member of Åbo Aktiebank in 1896 and member of Bank of Finland discount committee. In 1905 the brothers founded steam shipping company Transito Ab which focused on timber and coal transportation. It was the first major cargo steam shipping company in Turku.

The Dahlström brothers participated in founding insurance companies Fennia and Verdandi in 1905 and two years later in Sampo. They worked in those for a short time in management positions.

== Political career ==
Dahlström was member of the diet in 1885, 1888, 1891, 1897, 1899 and 1904–1905. He was city councillor in Turku in 1875–1894.

== Philanthropy ==
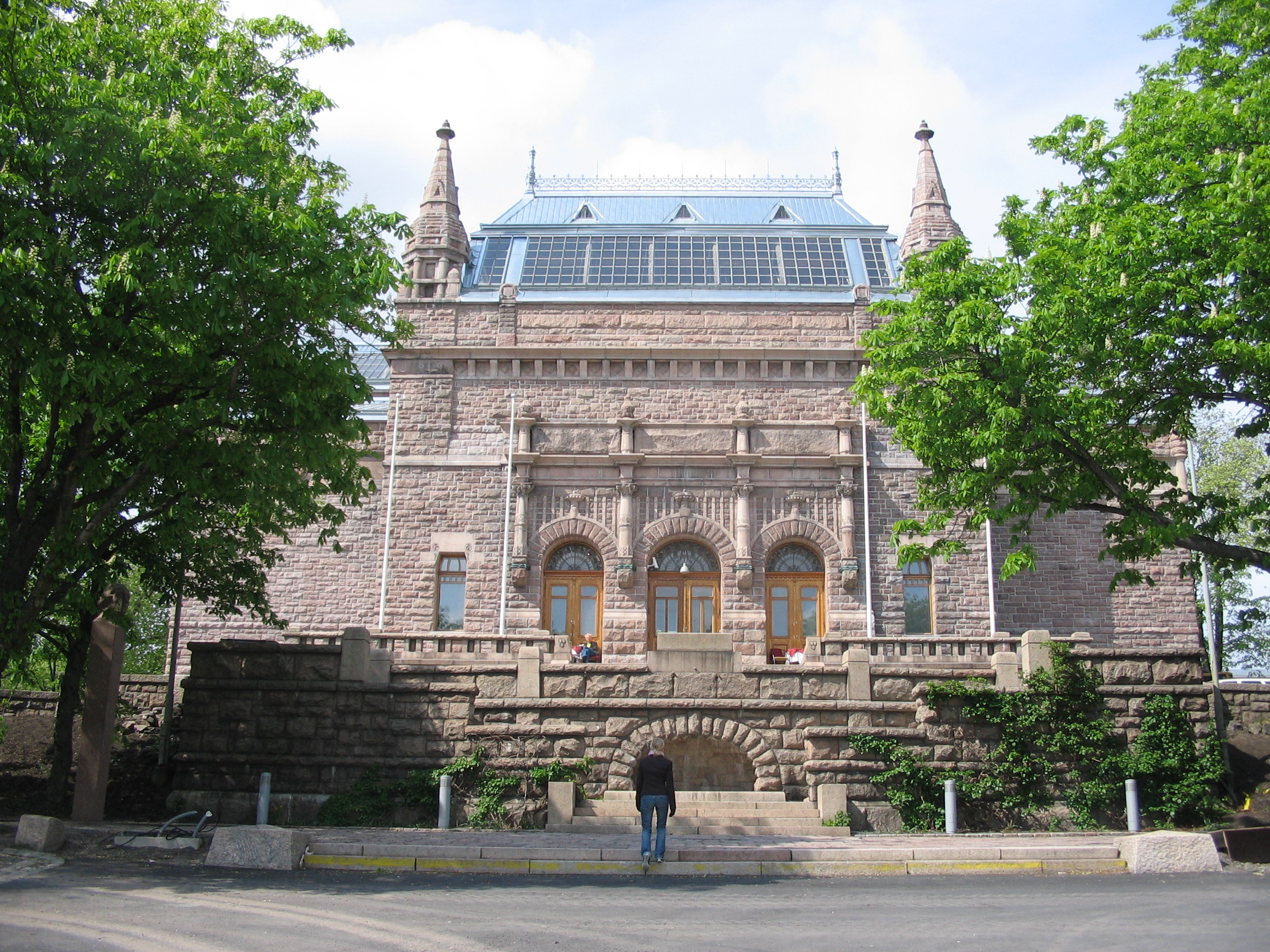
Turku Art Museum.

The brothers were theatre and art patrons and in the 1890s they started donating significant sums to their home city, Turku. In 1895 the brothers donated 150 000 marks for art museum building. The granite-made Turku Art Museum planned by Gustaf Nyström was built on Puolalanmäki and inaugurated in April 1904. In 1912 the brothers saved the Swedish-speaking theatre from financial trouble; the theatre was renamed Åbo Svenska Teater in 1919. Donations by Dahlström brothers had an important role in 1919 at founding Åbo Akademi, the Swedish speaking university of Turku.

While the art museum and university were the most significant donations, the brothers also supported individual students and public health work. Their actions also inspired other donors.

== Family ==
Ernst and Rosina Dahlström had two sons and daughter: Carl-Johan Dahlström (1876–1935), Greta Dahlström (1877–1902) and Erik Abraham Dahlström (1879–1943).
