= Gyula Dahlström =

Slovak entomologist (1834–1907)

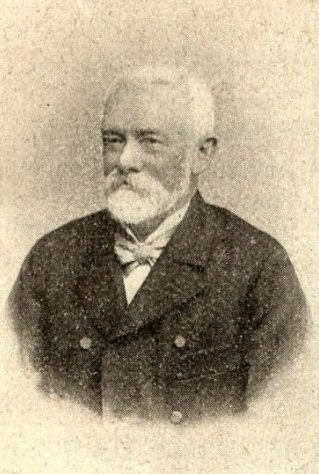

Gyula Eduard Dahlström baptized as Julius Edvardus Dahlström (23 January 1834 – 13 August 1907) was a Hungarian-Slovak entomologist who specialized in the study of the lepidoptera of the eastern Slovak region.

== Life and work ==
Dahlström was born Vranov nad Topľou, son of pharmacist Eduard Dahlström and his wife Juliana née Krajčinová. His father's family had origins in Sweden and an ancestor was an engineer who had built the Sóvár salt factory. He completed his 6th grade in 1849 when the family escaped a Russian invasion and moved to Miskolc where he trained as a merchant. He served in the Imperial German army and was discharged as a sergeant after seven years. He then moved to Prešov where he worked at an orphanage until 1867. He then worked as a cashier in the Prešov Savings Bank, a job he held for forty years until his retirement in April 1907. Alongside his career, he became interested in the lepidoptera of the region and collected extensively in his spare time, publishing notes in the Hungarian journal Rovartani lapok and the Leipzig collectors journal Insektenbörse. He pioneered the use of baits at night for moth collections and also reared caterpillars. He also trained other people to collect specimens for him and some of these have led to records that are now considered to have errors in their collection location information, having been collected from the Tatra Mountains.

He died suddenly while on an excursion in the area of Solivar near Prešov in 1907. His collections are now held in the Hungarian National Museum in Budapest and some parts in the Rákoczi Museum in Košice.
