= Carl Korsman =

Finnish shipowner and military officer (1829–1907)

Carl Johan Korsman
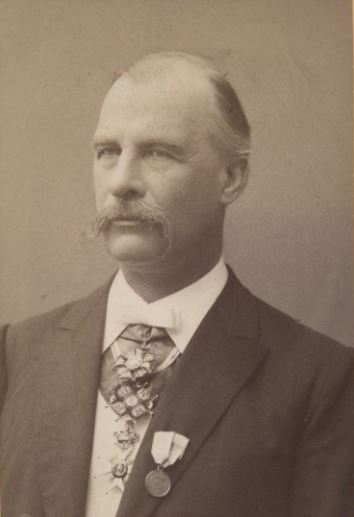
- Carl Korsman in the late 1880s.
- Born: 14 June 1829; Pyhämaa, Grand Duchy of Finland
- Died: 24 May 1907 (aged 77); Helsinki, Grand Duchy of Finland
- Occupations: shipowner, military officer
- Spouse: 1854→: Isabella Charlotta née Ramsell (1832–1907)
- Children: Karl Vilhelm (1855–1906); Artur (b. 1857); Aina Maria (b. 1858); Hedvig Charlotta (b. 1860); Jakob Waldemar (b. 1862); Ilma Augusta (b. 1864); Sigrid Elisabet (b. 1865); Werner Johan (1867–1868); Elin, married Krogius (b. 1869); Anna (b. 1869); Werner Johan (1871–1872); Edith (b. 1875)
- Parent(s): Johan Jacob Korsman and Amalia Carolina née Achander
- Military career
- Allegiance: Russian Empire
- Branch: infantry
- Service years: 1846–1868
- Rank: captain
- Units: Finnish Rifle Battalion (1846–1851); 1st Rifle Battalion (1851–1852); Finnish Grenadier Rifle Battalion (1852–1855); Turku Rifle Battalion (1856–1868)

Carl Johan Korsman (14 June 1829 – 24 May 1907) was a Finnish shipowner and military officer.

Korsman joined in the military in 1846; he served in infantry and resigned in 1868 as captain.

In 1869 Korsman started shipping business first in coastal shipping, later in liner shipping operating from Turku to Stockholm and Saint Petersburg. He became a significant operator in 1878 when he started winter season shipping between Hanko and Stockholm. Korsman laid the basis to the Finnish winter season shipping together with captain August Alexander Granroth.

Korsman founded also Vätti techno-chemical factory and engineering company Åbo Mekaniska Verkstads Ab. He developed the Hanko spa the most prominent in Finland.

Korsman retired in 1895 and moved to Helsinki, where he died in 1907.

== Early years ==
Korsman was born in Pyhämaa, Finland Proper. His parents were vicar of Merikarvia Johan Jacob Korsman and Amalia Carolina née Achander. Korsman studied six years in Pori trivial school, after which he went to military.

== Military career ==
Korsman started his military career in Finnish Rifle Battalion in which he served as junior non-commissioned officer in 1846–1849, Fähnrich with Portepee in 1849–1851 and ensign in 1851–1852. After this he was relocated to Finnish Grenadier Rifle battalion; he became sub-lieutenant in 1853 and in 1855 he was promoted lieutenant. In 1856 Korsman became company commander in Turku Rifle Battalion. He became first staff captain and in 1868 he became captain. Korsman left the military in the same year.

== Shipping ==
In 1868 Korsman started trading firewood in Turku, but already in the following year he moved to a new line of business: Korsman bought a screw-propeller steamer named Ahkera and started liner shipping between Turku and Salo. In the 1870s he expanded from coastal shipping to liner shipping between Turku and Stockholm, and cargo shipping in the Baltic Sea. Korsman aimed to use the latest technology and to increase the capacity. In 1874 Korsman founded shipping company Ångfartygsaktiebolaget Åbo to operate between Stockholm and Saint Petersburg by steamship Åbo, which was the largest steamship built in Finland until then.

A company called Finska Transito-ångbåtsaktiebolaget had started winter season operation between Hanko and Stockholm in 1876 by 298-tonne S/S Express. Due to unprofitable summer season operation the company bankrupted in 1878. The state regarded a year-round operation to Sweden highly important, and sought for successor for the operation. Korsman saw the potential of steam shipping for wintertime operation, and rented the ship from the state which had confiscated it due to outstanding payments. He moved to Hanko and recruited captain August Alexander Granroth to master the ship. Express sailed weekly between Stockholm and Hanko between 15 November and 15 May. Out of total 303 journeys planned during 1878–1889, 242 were successful despite difficult ice conditions at times. Korsman played with a high risk, because no a marine insurance company agreed giving an insurance to a such operation; on the other hand, the Grand Duchy and city of Stockholm supported him financially.

During the 1880s the number of passengers grew and in addition to mail delivery, Korsman exported Finnish butter and paper to the Swedish and British market. Korsman and captain Granroth created the basis for the Finnish winter shipping, and Hanko became the centre of it. In 1889 the state organised a Danish icebreaker to ease manoeuvring in ice and in the following year the first state-owned icebreaker started in service. Korsman planned to grow his business and buy another ship alongside the Express which he had earlier purchased from the state, but gave up with the plan for health reasons. He built a four-floor house in Helsinki, close to South Harbour in 1895.

== Other businesses ==
Korsman was founder and manager of Vätti techno-chemical factory started in 1872. In 1874 he took part at founding engineering company Åbo Mekaniska Verkstads Ab and became its manager.

During 1880–1890 Korsman was the manager of Hanko spa, which developed the most significant spa of Finland during his leadership.

== Positions of trust ==
Korsman took part in many municipal positions of trust both in Turku and Hanko. He was chairman of Hanko town council in 1890–1891. During 1885–1889 Korsman participated in three committees which aimed developing the Finnish seafaring.

== Personal life ==
In 1854 Korsman married Isabella Charlotta née Ramsell (1832–1907). The couple got 12 children in 1855–1875; ten of them lived until adulthood.
