= Magnus Dahlström =

Finnish businessman (1859–1924)

Robert Magnus Dahlström
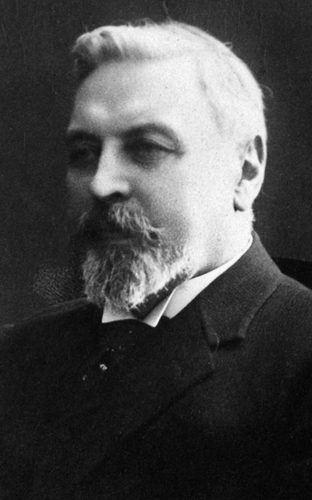
- Born: 11 April 1859; Turku, Grand Duchy of Finland
- Died: 5 March 1924 (aged 64); Turku, Finland
- Employers: Trading house C.M. Dahlström (1881 →); Aura Sockerbruks Ab (1900–1918)
- Board member of: Aura Sockerbruks Ab (1900–1918); Isbrytare Ab Avance (1904–1909); Ångfartygs Ab Transito (1905–1909); Kymin Oy; Ångfartygs Ab Bore; life insurance company Fennia (1905–); reinsurance company Verdandi (1905–); Turku art foundation (1906–); mutual insurance company Sampo (1907–); Ab Crichton (1914–)
- Spouse: Ellen Maria née Julin
- Parent(s): Carl Magnus Dahlström and Sofia Karolina née Kingelin
- Relatives: Ernst Dahlström (brother)
- Awards: Commercial Counsellor (1909); Commander of the White Rose of Finland

Manager of Aura Sockerbruks Ab
- In office 1900–1918

Robert Magnus Dahlström (11 April 1859 – 5 March 1924) was a Finnish businessman and philanthropist.

Dahlström led trading house C.M. Dahlström together with his brother Ernst Dahlström. The trading house had ownership in number of companies, including Aura Sugar Refinery, in which Dahlström worked as manager.

The Dahlström brothers donated large sums to develop cultural activities in city of Turku. They also funded foundation of the Swedish-speaking university Åbo Akademi.

== Career ==
Dahlström studied first six grades in Åbo svenska klassiska lyceum until 1877, after which he studied business in Stuttgart, Germany. He did also studies in Turku art school. He returned in Turku in 1881 to work for trading house C. M. Dahlström founded by his father. He led it together with his older brother Ernst Dahlström. Magnus Dahlström led Aura Sockerbruks Ab during years 1900–1918; at the same time he was also chairman of the board. He worked also as board member of many other companies.

The brothers worked close to each other and it is difficult to distinguish the initiator of each project they were involved to. Also their spouses were siblings: Ernst had married Rosina Sofia Julin in 1875 and Magnus Dahlström married her younger sister, 1860-born Ellen Maria Julin in 1885. The father of the Julin sisters was consul John Julin.

Dahlström founded energy company Oy Electron Ab in 1898 together with another local businessman Henning von Rettig. The city granted the company permission to build electrical grid. The company was not able to answer the increasing need of electricity, and after losing tendering for building tram network the company ceased to exist in 1908.

In 1905, the brothers founded steam shipping company Transito Ab which focused on timber and coal transportation. At the same time they participated in founding insurance companies Fennia, Verdandi and Sampo, in which they also worked in management positions.

Magnus Dahlström was founding member of Ab Crichton and board member from 1914.

== Political career ==
Dahlström was Turku city councillor in 1896–1904.

== Philanthropy ==
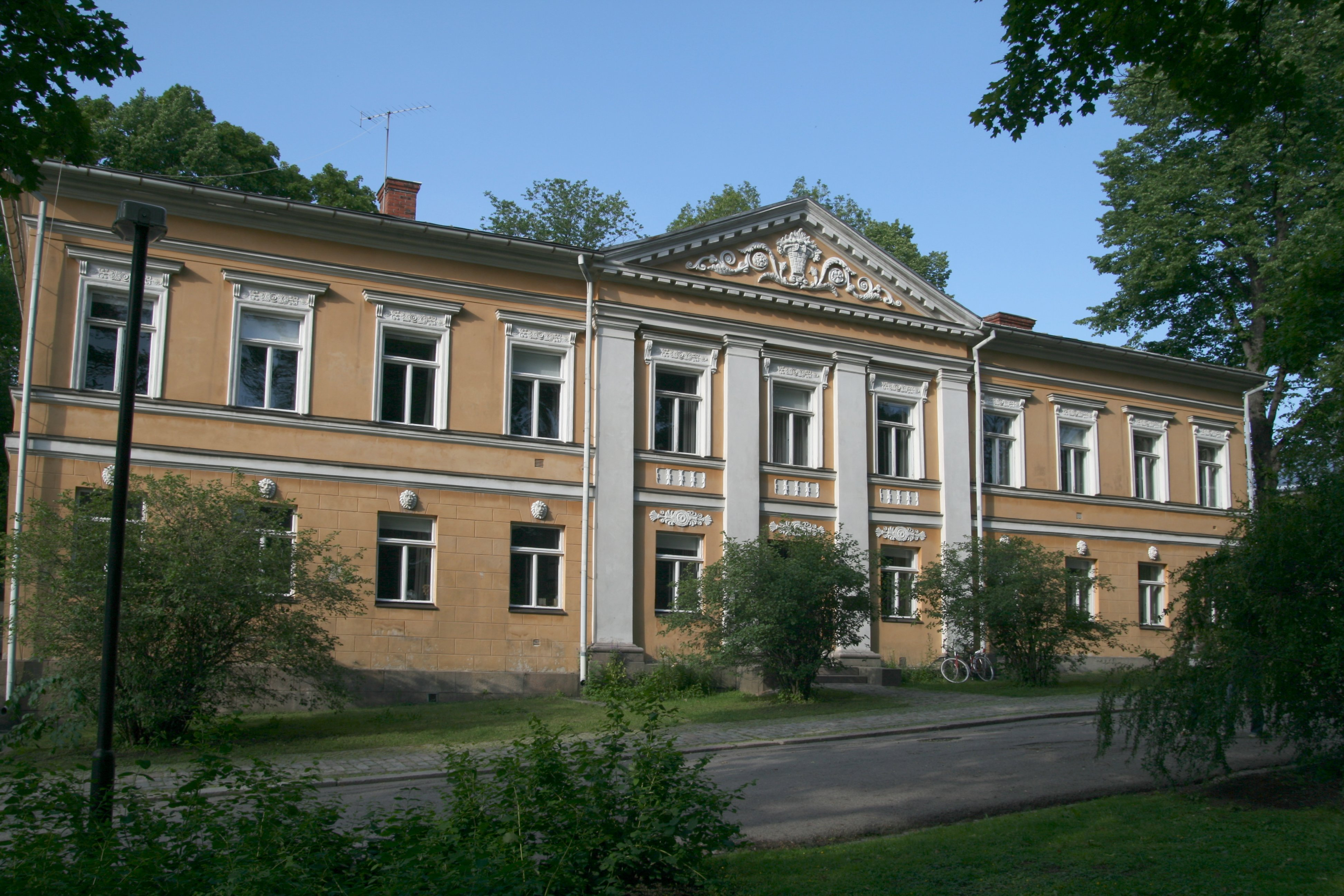
Domvillan, former residence of Magnus and Ellen Dahlström.

The brothers were theatre and art patrons and in the 1890s they started donating significant sums to their home city, Turku. In 1895, the brothers donated 150 000 marks for art museum building. The granite-made Turku Art Museum planned by Gustaf Nyström was built on Puolalanmäki and inaugurated in April 1904. In 1912, the brothers saved the Swedish-speaking theatre from financial trouble; the theatre was renamed Åbo Svenska Teater in 1919. Donations by Dahlström brothers had an important role in 1919 at founding Åbo Akademi, the Swedish speaking university of Turku.

While the art museum and university were the most significant donations, the brothers also supported individual students and public health work. Their actions also inspired other donors.

Magnus and Ellen Dahlström remained childless and bequeathed their property to Åbo Akademi, Turku Art Association and Åbo Svenska Teater. Their former residence close to Turku Cathedral is nowadays in use by Åbo Akademi.
