= Kalanti =

Former municipality in Finland

Coordinates: 60.8186°N 21.5563°E

Coat of arms of Kalanti

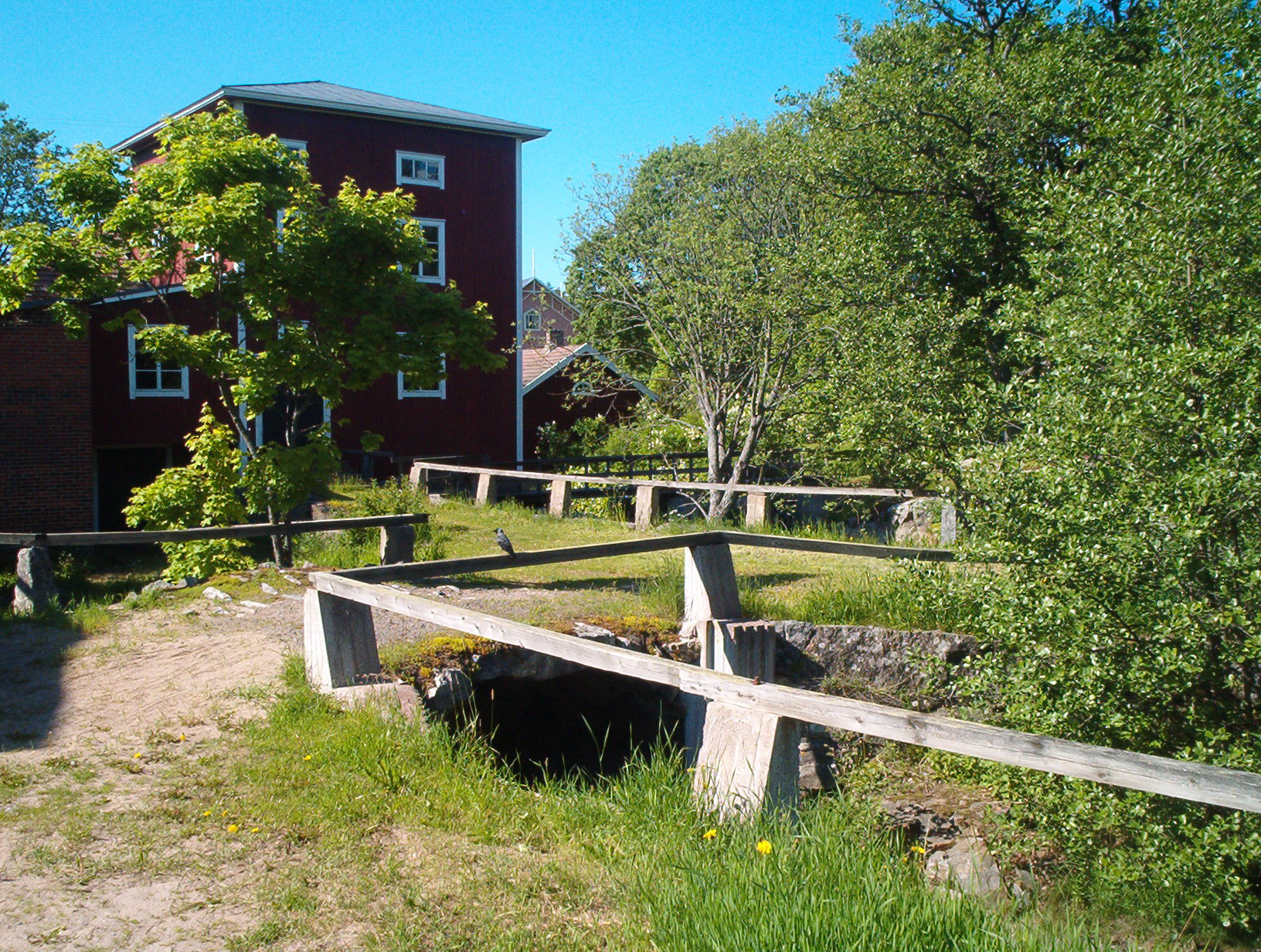
Kalanti

Kalanti (Swedish: Kaland, officially Uusikirkko Tl during 1915–1936) is a former municipality in Southwest Finland region, Finland. Kalanti is first mentioned in historical sources 1316. It was merged with Uusikaupunki in 1993.

In 1756, a religious revival that had a strong impact on the Southwest Finland began in Kalanti, when Lisa Eriksdotter experienced a religious epiphany.
