= Donald A. Dahlstrom =

American chemical engineer

Donald Albert Dahlstrom (January 16, 1920 – June 16, 2004) was recognized by the American Institute of Chemical Engineers (AIChE) as one 100 prominent chemical engineers of the modern era, for his work on liquid-solids separation, particularly with respect to the hydrocyclone. He was a professor in the Chemical Engineering Department of the University of Utah, and served as President of the AIChE in 1964.

Dahlstrom was born in Minneapolis, Minnesota. He attended Macalester College, and later graduated from the University of Minnesota in 1942. He worked for the International Petroleum Company in Peru from 1942 to 1945. He served in the United States Navy from October 1945 to May 1946, and became a seaman second class stationed in San Diego, California. He gained his PhD (in metallurgy and chemical engineering) from the Robert R. McCormick School of Engineering and Applied Science in 1949. After serving in the Navy, he worked for as the "point man" for Eimco and also worked for Envirotech before taking up an academic post at the University of Utah.
