= Carl Magnus Dahlström =

Commercial Counsellor Carl Magnus Dahlström
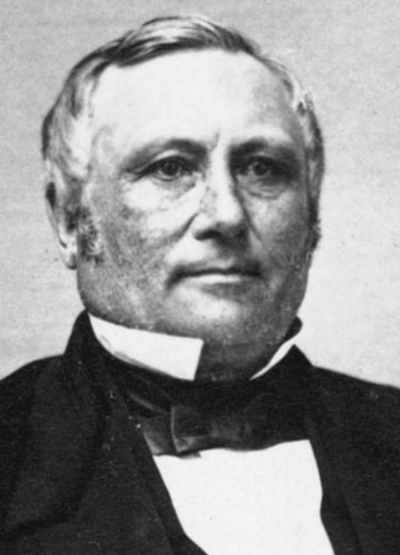
- Born: 25 November 1805; Loviisa, Sweden
- Died: 23 February 1875 (aged 69); Turku, Grand Duchy of Finland
- Occupation: merchant
- Spouse: 1844→: Sofia Karolina née Kingelin (1823–1892)
- Children: Carl August (1844–1869); Ernst Abraham (1846–1924); Sofia Charlotta (1847–1858); Berndt Magnus (1850–1853); Edvard Ludvig (1851–1886); Anna Sofia (1853–1863); Robert Magnus (1859–1924)
- Parent(s): Abraham Dahlström and Anna Sofia née Tollet
- Awards: Commercial Counsellor (1859)

Carl Magnus Dahlström (25 November 1805 – 23 February 1875) was a Finnish merchant, businessman and Commercial Counsellor.

After gaining trading experience in Loviisa, Dahlström moved to Turku to work for Abraham Kingelin's trading house. He started his own trading house two years later and focused on retail in the Baltic Sea area. Dahlström's trading house grew substantially after taking over Kingelin's businesses.

Dahlström invested in steam shipping and became one of the most significant shipowners of the city.

Since the 1850s, Dahlström invested increasingly on domestic industry. He was founding owner of Aura Sugar Mill, Turku Engineering Works, Kymi Paper Mill and Akaa Steam Sawmill.

Dahlström took part in the local politics and represented Turku bourgeoisie in Diet of Finland 1863–1864.

Dahlström's sone Ernst and Magnus continued their father's businesses and became notable philanthropists in Turku.

== Early years ==
Dahlström was born in Loviisa, Uusimaa Province. His parents were Swedish-born gardener Abraham Dahlström and Anna Sofia née Tollet. Father died when Carl Magnus was just 12 years old.

== Career ==
=== Merchant career ===
Dahlström's first workplace was at local merchant Nordman, and in 1832, he moved to Turku to work as bookkeeper for Abraham Kingelin's trading house. In 1836, he received bourgeoisie rights and founded a retail company together with Carl Gustaf Eschner, who also was originally from Loviisa. In 1842, Dahlström became sole owner. He developed business with help of his former employer, Abraham Kingelin, and created a wide network of business partners in Saint Petersburg, Stockholm, Hamburg and Lübeck. He travelled almost yearly in Germany, Sweden and France. In 1844, Dahlström married Kingelin's daughter Sofia Karolina. When Kingelin's trading house later fell into trouble, Dahlström took it over in 1859. The main export articles were timber, butter, iron and pine tar; in the way back Dahlström imported coffee, grain, sugar and alcoholic beverages.

=== Shipping ===
As Dahlström's businesses relied on sea transport, he invested on shipping. The local pioneer in steam shipping, Åbo ångfartygsbolag ("Turku Steam Shipping Company"), bankrupted in 1849, after which the company was re-established under name Åbo nya ångfartygsbolag ("Turku New Steam Shipping Company"), in which Dahlström was a shareholder. In 1856, he founded Aura Ångfartygsbolag, which operated new steamship Aura; the ship travelled from Turku to Stockholm in 14 hours. The company was merged to the New Steamship Company in 1861. By the 1860s, Dahlström was one of the most significant shipowners of Turku.

=== Aura Sugar Refinery ===
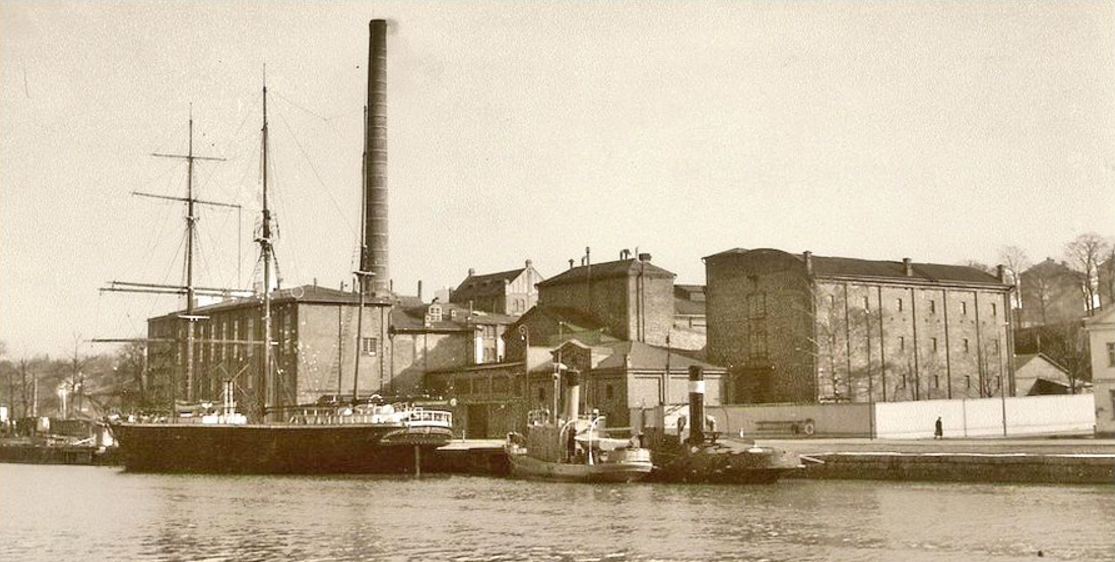
Aura Sugar Refinery at river Aura in Turku.

The new economic policy following to the Crimean War and economic upswing advanced the development of Finland. Therefore, Dahlström decided to invest on domestic production. He saw potential in sugar production, as the oldest sugar refinery of Finland, located in Turku, had been closed down already in 1824 and more than 90% of sugar in the Finnish market was imported. A new technology developed abroad made it possible to produce sugar competitively in Finland. A consortium of Turku merchants, including Dahlström, Fr. Spoof, Gustaf Adolf Lindblom, E. P. Thomé and Abraham Kingelin Jr. founded Aura Sockerbruk, ("Aura Sugar Refinery"). A modern factory building was built in 1856–1859. Dahlström was the first manager of the company, and under his leadership, the operations were profitable since the beginning, and the company became a strong competitor against the other domestic producer, Töölö Sugar Refinery.

=== Engineering ===
Dahlström could see the potential of steam-engine powered seafaring and invested on engineering operations. He was a shareholder in the 1874-started Åbo mekaniska verkstads ("Turku Engineering Works"), founded by Carl Korsman. At the beginning the main focus was on shipbuilding, but later the company specialised on machinery.

=== Forest industry ===
Dahlström saw potential in the Finnish sawmilling and paper industry. He was founding owner of 1872 started Kymi Paper Mill located in Kuusankoski; he owned six of total 20 shares of the company, being the largest shareholder. Dahlström's son Ernst Dahlström was the first manager of the company. Dahlström was the main shareholder also in Viiala-located 1873 founded Akkas Ångsåg Ab ("Akaa Steam Sawmill Ltd"), which was a joint project between Turku and Tampere businessmen.

=== Other businesses ===
Dahlström was co-founder of Turku Gasworks in 1861; the company built street lighting to the city. Large part of Dahlström's industrial property had come through his marriage. He owned shares from Littoinen Baize Factory and Kingelin & Co. brewery. Managing of industrial operations took eventually so much of Dahlström's time that he gave up retail business in 1870.

=== Political career ===
Since the 1840s, Dahlström took part in positions of trust. He was selected to follow his father-in-law in the board of city elders. Dahlström took part in boards of schools and other institutions. He represented the bourgeoisie of Turku in Diet of Finland in 1863–1864; as a member of treasury committee, he promoted renewal of economic legislation and building a railway connection between Turku and Helsinki.

== Private life ==
Dahlström married Sofia Karolina née Kingelin in 1844. The couple got two daughters and five sons in 1844–1859; three sons survived until adult age. 1846 born Ernst and 1859-born Magnus continued their father's businesses and became notable philanthropists in Turku.
