= Bibb =

Bibb may refer to:

== Places in the United States ==
- Bibb County, Alabama
- Fort Bibb, Alabama, constructed in 1818
- Bibb City, Georgia, in Muscogee County
- Bibb County, Georgia

== People ==
- Bibb (surname)
- Bibb (given name)

== Ships ==
- USRC Bibb (1845), a Revenue Marine cutter transferred to the United States Coast Survey in 1847
- USS Bibb (1853), a Coast Survey vessel, sometimes considered to be the same vessel as the first Bibb
- USCGC Bibb (WPG-31), a Coast Guard cutter commissioned 10 March 1937

== Other uses ==
- bibb, bibcock, hose bib
- Bibb, a variety of butterhead lettuce
- Bibb Correctional Facility, a state men's prison in Brent, Alabama
- Bibb County High School, Centreville, Alabama
- Bibb Manufacturing Company, a defunct American textile company

== See also ==
- Bibbs
