= Waterwitch =

Waterwitch, water-witch, Water Witch, or variant, may refer to:

== Ships ==
- CSS Water Witch, a Confederate States Navy gunboat
- HMS Waterwitch, several Royal Navy vessels
- USS Water Witch, several United States Navy ships
- Water Witch (schooner), an 1832 ship that sank in Lake Champlain in 1866
- Water Witch (1835 cutter), a cutter owned by the Government of South Australia
- Water Witch (1835 steamer), a British Cross-Channel steam packet

== Other uses ==
- Waterwitch, New Jersey, an unincorporated community in Highlands, Monmouth County
- The Water-Witch, an 1830 novel by James Fenimore Cooper
- Water Witch (novel) a novel by Connie Willis and Cynthia Felice
- Water Witch Club Casino, listed on the NRHP in Monmouth County, New Jersey
- Water Witch Club Historic District, listed on the NRHP in Monmouth County, New Jersey
- Dowsing, divination to find ground water or other minerals
- Pied-billed grebe, a species of waterfowl sometimes referred to as Water Witch
