= Steam frigate =

Type of steam-powered warship

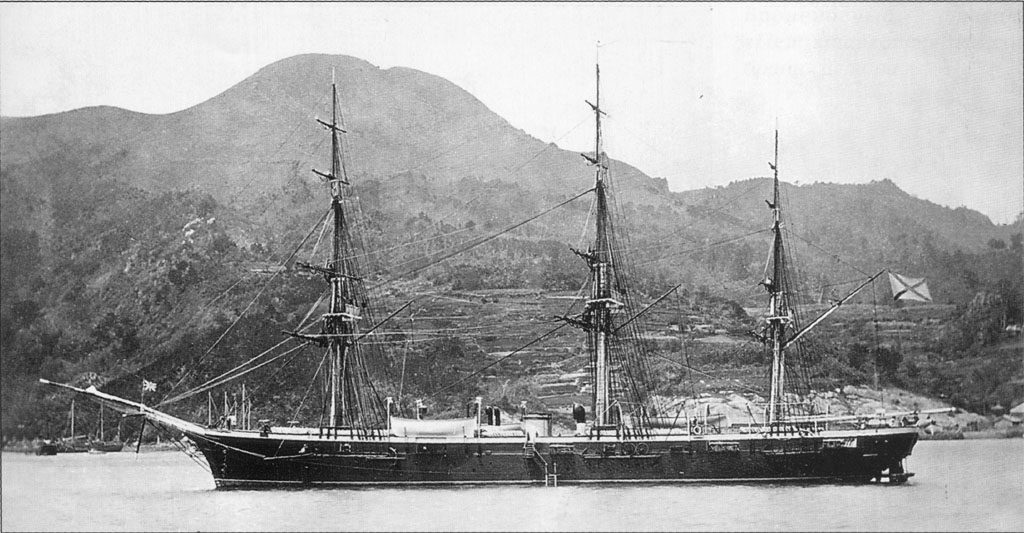
Russian steam corvette Vityaz

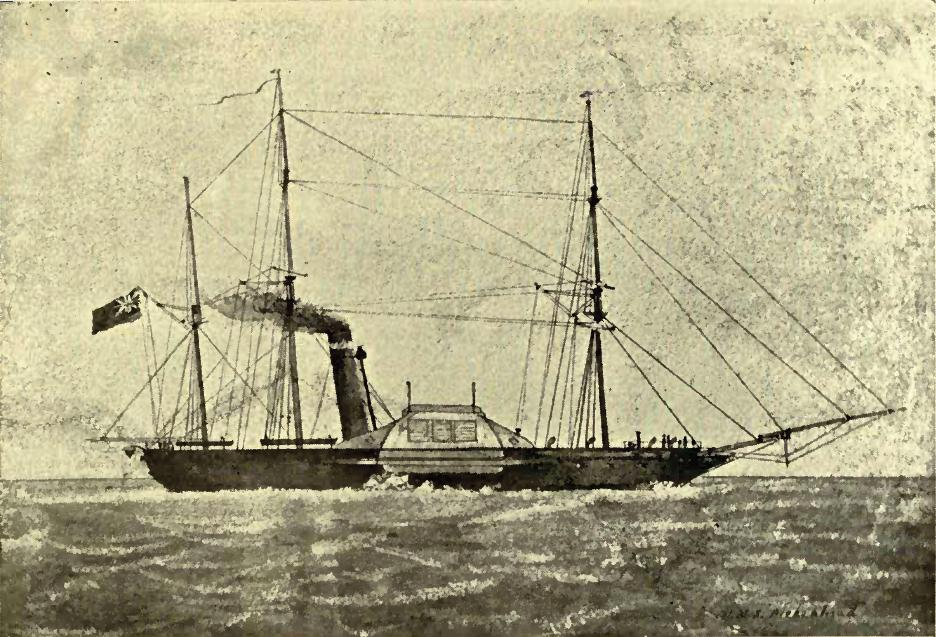
HMS Birkenhead was laid down as a steam frigate, but made redundant by screw-driven propulsion before her completion in 1845.

Steam frigates (including screw frigates) and the smaller steam corvettes, steam sloops, steam gunboats and steam schooners were steam-powered warships that were not meant to stand in the line of battle. The first such ships were paddle steamers. Later on the invention of screw propulsion enabled construction of screw-powered versions of the traditional frigates, corvettes, sloops and gunboats.

== Evolution ==
=== First steam warships ===
The first small vessel that can be considered a steam warship was the Demologos, which was launched in 1815 for the United States Navy. From the early 1820s, the British Royal Navy began building a number of small steam warships including the armed tugs HMS Comet and HMS Monkey, and by the 1830s the navies of the United States, Russia and France were experimenting with steam-powered warships. Hellenic sloop-of-war Kartería (Καρτερία; Greek for "Perseverance") was the first steam-powered warship to be used in combat operations in history. It was built in 1825 in an English shipyard for the revolutionary Hellenic Navy during the Greek War of Independence, on the order of Capt Frank Abney Hastings, a former Royal Navy officer who had volunteered his services to the Hellenic Navy.

=== Frigate classification ===
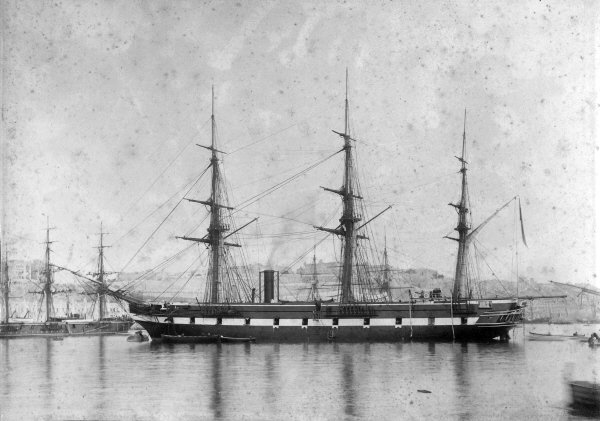
Swedish steam frigate HSwMS Vanadis (1868).

The frigate and corvette were 'ships'. For a vessel to be called a 'ship' it had to have full rigging, square rigs on three masts. If it had only fore-and-aft rig on the mizzen mast, it was not a ship. Ships were classified as: ships of the line, frigates and corvettes.

The upper limit for a ship to be still considered a frigate was that it had only one covered gun deck. If a ship had two covered gun decks, it was no longer a frigate, but a ship of the line. A confusing circumstance arose when in the early nineteenth century the forecastle and quarterdecks of most big ships were joined to become a complete flush deck above. These ships continued to be frigates such as HMS Constance (1846).

The lower limit for a ship to still be considered a frigate was that its gun deck was covered. If a ship had only a single open gun deck, it was considered to be 'corvette build'. If a ship had a single covered gun deck, it was at least a frigate.

In general, a frigate was commanded by a captain and a corvette by a lieutenant.

== Paddle frigates ==
This first generation of steam warships were "paddle warships" (in the categories of frigate, sloop, gunvessel or other). They used paddlewheels mounted on either side or in the center. Paddle steamers were severely limited in the armaments they could mount. Paddle wheel propulsion also had very serious effects on sailing quality. The placement of the machinery and wheels in the middle of the ship conflicted with having the main mast there and so the sail plan of paddle frigates was less than ideal. Another characteristic that slowed down these vessels was that the paddle wheels would rotate in the water freely when the ship was sailing.

The armament of paddle frigates compared badly with their sail-only counterparts. Paddle frigates could not have a traditional full broadside because of the space taken by the machinery and the paddle wheels. The weight of the machinery and coal these ships carried was a perhaps even more serious problem. It meant that the designers had to limit the weight of all other 'cargo', including artillery. Therefore the armament of steam vessels had to follow a different concept: Because of their ability to move against the wind, they could be assumed to be able to choose their distance to sail-only ships. Under those circumstances, the very heavy guns that were deemed to fire too slowly for close-quarters combat did become useful because they had a high effective range. Meanwhile, the development of heavy shell guns like the ML 8-inch shell gun provided a long range weapon that could sink a ship with a single hit. The only means to counter it was to develop heavier solid shot cannon that had an even higher effective range. All this generally led to equipping early steamers with only a few very heavy guns, both shell guns and solid shot guns. These were often mounted on pivots and slides.

Paddle frigates were used extensively during the Opium Wars, the Mexican–American War, the Crimean War and the American Civil War. An unintended quality was that the lack of broadside batteries gave them very spacious decks. Combined with being immune to contrary winds, this made them ideal for large scale troop transport. By 1870 most had been scrapped or sold into civilian service.

=== Royal Navy ===
By 1840, the Royal Navy had commissioned two ships that had been designed as steam paddle frigates. HMS Gorgon and the slightly larger HMS Cyclops had both been constructed to have a full battery on their gun deck, next to carrying guns on their upper decks. However, Gorgon was so deep in the water that her gun ports had to be shut permanently. Cyclops had been designed to carry 16 32-pounders on the main deck, but these could not be fitted. Both ships therefore failed to become true frigates, but were nevertheless very successful. The Cyclops would be taken as a model to build six more of these steam frigates (Vulture, Firebrand, Gladiator, Sampson, Dragon and Centaur). On 31 May 1844 the Admiralty then officially adopted the term 'Steam frigate'. All these ships became steam (paddle) frigates of the second class, except for Gorgon, which became a sloop.

The rating of Cyclops as a 'steam frigate' was surprising: she was rigged as a brig (with only two masts), and carried all her guns on the upper deck Other aspects did explain this classification. The Cyclops was commanded by a captain and had at least been planned to have a 'complete' covered gun deck. The crew of 175 men was a reduced crew. By counting 13 men for every two 32-pounders, the designed complement would be 175 + (8*13) = 284 men, almost matching that of a fifth rate frigate. Another reason to rate the Cyclops as a frigate was that with her size of 1,190 bm tons, she was of the same size as the fifth rate frigates like those of the Seringapatam-class frigate of 1,150 bm tons. As the RN lacked a corvette category, the alternative would have been to rate her as a sloop, but even ship-rigged sloops did not get near her size. When the RN started to use the designation corvette, the Cyclops and her six near sisters were re-classified as corvettes in the 1850s.

In 1844 the Admiralty also discerned steam frigates of the first class, these steam frigates had guns on two decks. The steam frigates of the 'first class' were comparable to regular fourth rate sailing frigates in terms of size, and got near them in armament. The first of these was the paddle steamer HMS Penelope commissioned in 1843. She had been the sailing fifth rate frigate Penelope of 1829. In 1842 she was lengthened by 63 feet, and was fitted with the largest naval steam engines yet seen, generating nearly 700 horsepower. She had a 330 men crew, and was armed with 10 68-pounders on the main deck, and on the forecastle and quarterdeck: two 85 cwt pivot guns, 10 42-pounders carronades and 4 howitzers.

Penelope was followed by even bigger ships like HMS Retribution and HMS Terrible. Other steam frigates first class, like HMS Avenger were a bit smaller. Only five first class steam paddle frigates would be built by the Royal Navy. The RN also built some more steam frigates of the second class, surprisingly with guns on two decks.

=== United States Navy ===
The United States Navy likewise started with a general 'steamer' class. In 1842 it consisted of USS Fulton (1837) of 4 guns, commissioned in 1837, and USS Union (1842) (with a horizontal submerged paddle). Union was not yet armed but would later also have 4 guns. USS Poinsett (1840) was a smaller craft, which would later be armed with 2 guns. By then the U.S. Navy already had the screw corvette USS Princeton (1843) under construction.

The first steam frigates of the United States were USS Mississippi (1841) and USS Missouri (1841). They were two very big steam paddle frigates commissioned in 1841 and 1842. They each displaced 3,220t and had 10 big Paixhans guns. By 1850 the U.S. paddle steamers were divided into classes. Mississippi was designated a steam frigate, and so were USS Susquehanna (1850) and USS Powhatan (1850), each with 9 heavy guns, and USS San Jacinto (1850) and USS Saranac (1848), each with 6 heavy guns. The next class were the 'steamers first class', containing Fulton, USS Michigan (1843) and USS Allegheny (1847). Seven other steamers were 'less than first class.'

=== Imperial Russian Navy ===
The Imperial Russian Navy also had a sizable fleet of paddle steam frigates. The first of these were imported from America, but by the time of the Crimean War, the Russians were producing steamships. The 1841 steam frigate Kamchatka had 16 guns on two decks, and was therefore comparable to the big frigates of the English and American navies. See also List of Russian steam frigates.

=== French Navy ===
The first useful steam vessel of the French Navy was Sphinx of 160 hp and 913t displacement. She was used in the invasion of Algiers in 1830. She was not very useful as a warship, but she was very useful for maintaining communications with Algeria. The subsequent campaign caused a huge demand for frequent and reliable communication with Algeria, and so about two dozen ships were built to the model of Sphinx. The side effect was a stagnation in French steam vessel engineering. Continuing the Sphinx type meant that France was not developing something that resembled a steam frigate.

Later on, the French state wanted to establish packet boat lines to New York, the West Indies and Brazil. The French navy wanted to have big steam frigates with heavy artillery. In 1840 these ideas were combined in a law that granted a credit of 28,400,000 francs for the construction of 14 ships of 450 hp, and 4 of 220 hp. The frigates built for this service soon proved to be no match for the ships of the Cunard Line. A project that lent four of them to a commercial company soon failed. Gomer was the first of these large frigates, and created quite a sensation. She was 70.5 m long between perpendiculars, had a beam of 12.7 m and displaced about 2,800 t. On the trial run she was armed with 20 30-pounders on the main deck, and on the upper deck 2 22 cm and 2 16 cm, and had a complement of 300 men. However, in actual use, the artillery proved to be way more than what Gomer could handle and so it had to be reduced to 2 80s and 6 30s. It meant that Gomer had failed as a steam frigate. The same could be said of her (near) sisters of 450 hp, Asmodéee and l'Infernal.

== Screw frigates ==
Screw warships were built with steam engines and screw propellers for propulsion. The first functional propeller, a shortened version of the Archimedes' screw, was invented independently by Francis Pettit Smith and John Ericsson in 1835. The technology of propeller or 'screw' propulsion was proven by 1845 after the Royal Navy evaluated the performance of Smith's seagoing steamship SS Archimedes in comparison with their own fleet of paddle steamers. The basic fighting capabilities of the screw warship were almost as good as those of the traditional sailing ship. Apart from spending weight on machinery and coal, the screw ship retained the full broadside battery lay-out. It therefore had a nearly as powerful armament as a sail-only ship. Unlike the paddle ship it had no vulnerable paddle-boxes. The ability to pick a fight or to evade a fight was what made the screw frigate superior to any sail-only ship.

The screw frigate retained a full sail-plan, and this was not only due to conservatism. The primary reason was a lack of coal supplies around the globe. That was an especially important consideration for frigates, which often operated independently on the far side of the world. The insufficient reliability of early steam engines was also a reason to maintain at least some sails. An often overlooked reason to have sails was the cost of coal. In 1848 the sail frigate HMS Thetis was estimated to cost 64 GBP daily to operate. HMS Terrible, of the same weight of armament, was estimated to cost 88 GBP daily. But, the latter was without the cost of coal, estimated at 4 pounds 5 shillings per hour of steaming.

The 'screw frigates', built first of wood and later of wrought iron, continued to perform the traditional role of the frigate until late in the 19th century.

By the late 1840s many navies were building screw-driven warships or converting sailing ships to include screw propulsion. In 1852 the French navy commissioned the Napoleon, the first screw driven battleship. With that all sailing warships had gotten a screw driven equivalent.

=== Royal Navy ===
When the Royal Navy launched its first screw frigate, HMS Amphion, it already had two screw sloops in commission. The 9 gun sloop HMS Rattler, launched in 1843, was designed by Isambard Kingdom Brunel and featured an advanced two-bladed propeller that influenced the design of his later passenger steamer SS Great Britain. Amphion had 28 32-pounders and 8 heavier guns. The size and armament of British wooden screw frigates then rapidly increased. HMS Euryalus of 1853 was 65 m long, displaced 3,125 t, had twenty-eight 8 inch 65 cwt shell guns and twenty-two 32-pounders. The RN's first battleship designed for steam propulsion was HMS Agamemnon. She was 70 m long, displaced 4,614 t, and had thirty-four 8-inch 65 cwt and fifty-six 32-pounders. In 1852–1853, the distinction between battleship and frigate was still a matter of size and number of gun decks.

The improved screw propeller invented by Brunel also enabled the Victorian Royal Navy to extend the service life of obsolete sail-powered ships of the line. HMS Erebus and HMS Terror, first commissioned during the War of 1812, were fitted with steam locomotive boilers in 1845 for the Franklin expedition. The paddle sloop HMS Phoenix was later rebuilt with a propeller for service in the Crimean War.

In the late 1850s, the screw frigate began to take a different form than traditional ships of the line. The RN's last battleship, the 91 gun HMS Defiance laid down in 1858, was 75 m long and displaced 5,700 t. The screw frigate HMS Shannon was much smaller at 3,915 t, but nevertheless much longer at 87 m. This development of much longer frigates culminated in HMS Mersey of 1858. Mersey had 40 heavy shell guns, reached an overall length of over 100 m and displaced 5,463 t. A wooden construction proved to be too weak for a ship of this length. The next steps were frigates with an iron or composite hull: the armored frigate and the unarmored frigate.

=== French Navy ===
The Pomone of 1842 was the first French screw frigate. She was 52 m long, 13.5 m wide, and had a slightly changed sail plan of a 46 gun frigate. She had 18 30-pounders on the gun deck, and 8 80-pounders and 8 other guns on the upper decks. The engine of the Pomone was 220 hp, giving her a speed of 7.5 knots. Using both sail and engine she could make 10.5 kn. Sailing before the wind, however she reached 12 kn without engines.

The French navy next built the L'Isly, converted a number of sailing frigates, and built a range of successful corvettes. In 1852 a program for a number of first rate frigates was started. The Impératrice Eugénie class of 5 ships was built according to a design by Henri Dupuy de Lôme. Georges Baptiste François Allix designed the Souveraine. On average these ships displaced 3,800 t and reached 12 kn on trials. In 1857 the French government decided to have 6 big and 14 smaller frigates.

== Armored frigates ==
From 1859, armor was added to ships based on existing frigate and ship of the line designs. The additional weight of the armour on these first ironclad warships meant that they could have only one gun deck, and they were technically frigates, even though they were more powerful than existing ships-of-the-line and occupied the same strategic role. The phrase 'armoured frigate' remained in use for some time to denote a sail-equipped, broadside-firing type of ironclad. For a time, they were the most powerful type of vessel afloat.

Towards the end of the 19th century, the term 'frigate' fell out of use. Armoured vessels were designated as either 'battleships' or 'armoured cruisers', while unarmoured vessels including frigates and sloops were classified as 'unprotected cruisers'.

== Survivors ==
The only surviving screw frigate is the Danish Jylland.

The steam sloop HMS Gannet spent many years as a training ship and is now preserved at Chatham.

The Dutch gunvessel HNLMS Bonaire is currently undergoing restoration as a museum ship.

ARA Uruguay of the Argentinian Navy is the only surviving steam and sail corvette.

A replica of the Japanese frigate Kaiyō Maru was built as a museum ship in 1990 after the original wreck was salvaged for preservation.

== See also ==
- List of frigate classes of the Royal Navy
- Screw sloop
