= USS Bibb =

One ship of the United States Navy, two ships of the United States. Revenue-Marine and its successor the United States Coast Guard have been named Bibb, in honor of George M. Bibb, senator from Kentucky and briefly Secretary of the Treasury in the Tyler administration. Two of the ships also served in the United States Coast Survey.

- USRC Bibb (1843), a Revenue-Marine cutter launched in Pittsburgh on 10 April 1845 and transferred to the Coast Survey in 1847; her engines were salvaged for use in the next Bibb.
- USS Bibb (1853), a Coast Survey vessel, occasionally attached to the Union Navy during the American Civil War, and for six months in 1861, transferred to the Revenue-Marine. Retired in 1879; sometimes considered to be the same vessel as the first Bibb.
- USCGC Bibb (WPG-31), a Coast Guard cutter commissioned 10 March 1937.
