= Bibb (surname) =

Bibb is a surname of English origin. At the time of the British Census of 1881, its relative frequency was highest in Warwickshire (12.2 times the British average), followed by Worcestershire, Staffordshire, Dunbartonshire, London and Northamptonshire. In all other British counties, its relative frequency was below national average. The name Bibb may refer to:

- Chris Bibb, British rugby league footballer
- David Bibb, American civil servant
- Eric Bibb (born 1951), American blues musician
- Emmanuel Bibb, American streetball player
- George M. Bibb (1776–1859), American politician
- Grace C. Bibb (1842–1912), American feminist and educator
- Henry Bibb (1815–1854), American abolitionist
- John Bibb, developer of Bibb lettuce
- Kyle Bibb (born 1988), English rugby league player
- Leon Bibb (newscaster) (born 1944), American broadcaster
- Leon Bibb (musician) (1922–2015), American folk singer and actor
- Leslie Bibb (born 1974), American actress
- Margaret Morton Bibb (c. 1832-1900/1910), African-American quilt maker
- Thomas Bibb (1783–1839), American politician
- William W. Bibb (1781–1820), American politician

== See also ==
- Bibb (disambiguation)
- Bibbs, a variant
