= USS Water Witch =

Three ships in the United States Navy have been named USS Water Witch.

- USS Water Witch (1845) was a steamer built in 1844 and 1845
- USS Water Witch (1847) was a modification of the hull of the first, launched in 1847. Her machinery went to the third ship.
- USS Water Witch (1851) was a wooden-hulled, sidewheel gunboat, launched in 1851. She was shot at on an expedition to Paraguay.
