= Russian frigate Kamchatka (1841) =

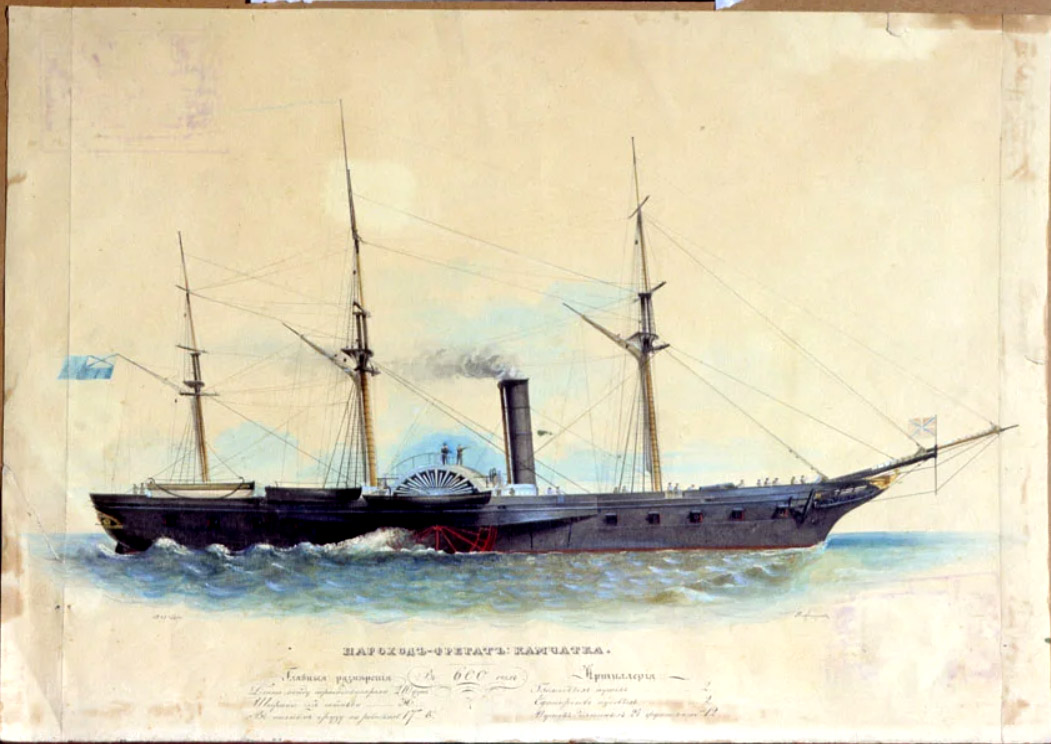

History

Russian Empire
- Name: Kamchatka
- Builder: William Brown shipyard, New York City
- Cost: $418,919
- Laid down: 24 April 1840
- Launched: 4 November 1840
- Completed: September 1841
- Decommissioned: 28 May 1866
- In service: 20 September 1841
- Out of service: 1867
- Fate: Dismantled for timber

General characteristics
- Class & type: Steam frigate
- Tons burthen: 2124 t
- Length: 60 meters
- Beam: 11 meters
- Propulsion: Sail, plus two 540 hp (400 kW) steam engines
- Speed: 10 knots (19 km/h)
- Armament: 14/16 guns

Kamchatka was a three-masted steam frigate of the Imperial Russian Navy. She was built in New York City in 1841 for the Baltic Fleet.

== Description ==
The mechanical installation of the ship consisted of two steam engines with cylinders with a diameter of 1,574.8 millimetres (5.167 ft). The largest diameter of the paddle wheels was 9.14 metres (30.0 ft), the length of the blades - 3.2 metres (10 ft), width - 0.61 metres (2.0 ft). The engines, boilers, and machinery was made by H.R. Durham and Co.

Kamchatka had 12 thirty-six pounders on the gun-deck. On the upper deck she had 2 ninety-six pounders on pivot at the bow and stern, and 2 sixty-four pounders on pivot fore.

Her bow was adorned with a golden eagle.

One English account reported that she was designed rather poorly with heavy engines and boilers of 450 tons able to produce only 260 horse-power, only about a half of what English steamers would have at that time for the similar engines and boilers. She also used almost as twice fuel as the similar steamers of her time.

== Service ==
On her maiden voyage she traveled from New York City to Southampton in 22 days, consuming 590 tons of coal. Taking in account that she sailed on that passage for about three days the daily consumption of coal was about 31 tons. Just the cost of the burned coal in 2019 dollars would be around $138,000. (Coal prices in 1840-1850 in the US were somewhere around $8 per ton.)

She made several long voyages under Captain (later Admiral) Johan Eberhard von Schantz. In 1845 she voyaged to the Mediterranean Sea in support of the Russian Royal family.

She was decommissioned 1866 and broken down for wood in 1867.

== See also ==
- List of Russian steam frigates
