= Water Witch Club Casino =

- U.S. National Register of Historic Places
- U.S. Historic district – Contributing property
- New Jersey Register of Historic Places
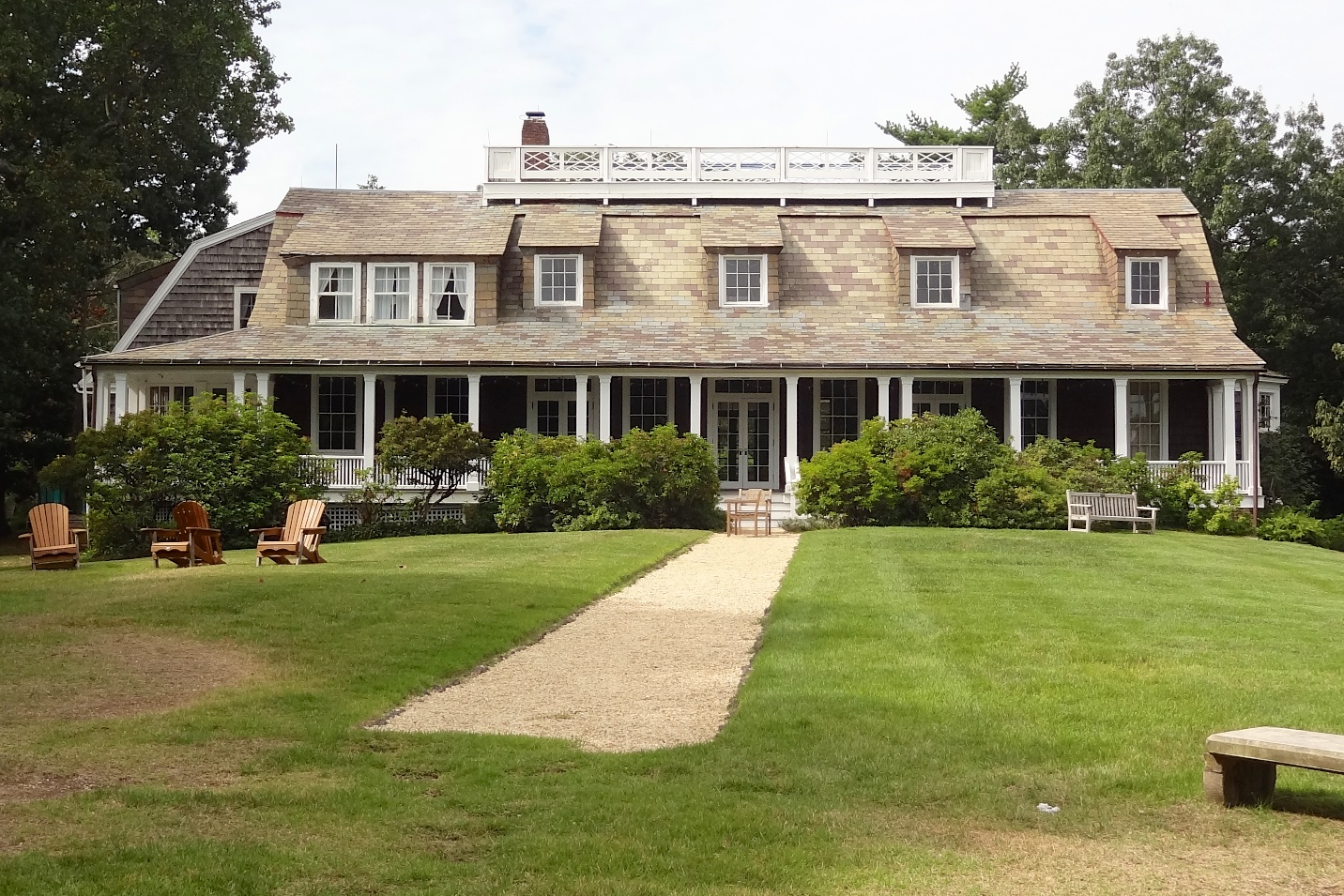

- Location within Monmouth County, New Jersey Location within New Jersey Location within the United States
- Location: East Twin Road and West Twin Road, Middletown Township, New Jersey
- Coordinates: 40°24′01″N 73°59′36″W
- Built: 1905
- Architect: Lyman T. Ford
- Architectural style: Colonial Revival, American Craftsman, Shingle Style
- Part of: Water Witch Club Historic District (ID04000147)
- NRHP reference No.: 90001219
- NJRHP No.: 2035

Significant dates
- Added to NRHP: August 13, 1990
- Designated CP: March 12, 2004
- Designated NJRHP: January 12, 1990

The Water Witch Club Casino is located at the corner of East Twin Road and West Twin Road in the Monmouth Hills section of Middletown Township in Monmouth County, New Jersey, United States. It is near the Waterwitch section of the borough of Highlands. The building was added to the National Register of Historic Places on August 13, 1990, for its significance in architecture and entertainment. It was listed as a contributing property of the Water Witch Club Historic District in 2004.

== History and description ==
The Water Witch Club was founded in 1895 by Ferdinand Fish, a New York City developer. The name comes from The Water-Witch, an 1830 novel by James Fenimore Cooper. The original casino, built in 1905, consisted of a billiards room and an assembly room. In 1911, it was expanded by adding a clubhouse, designed by architect Lyman T. Ford. The exterior of the building features Colonial Revival/Shingle Style architecture, while the interior features American Craftsman.

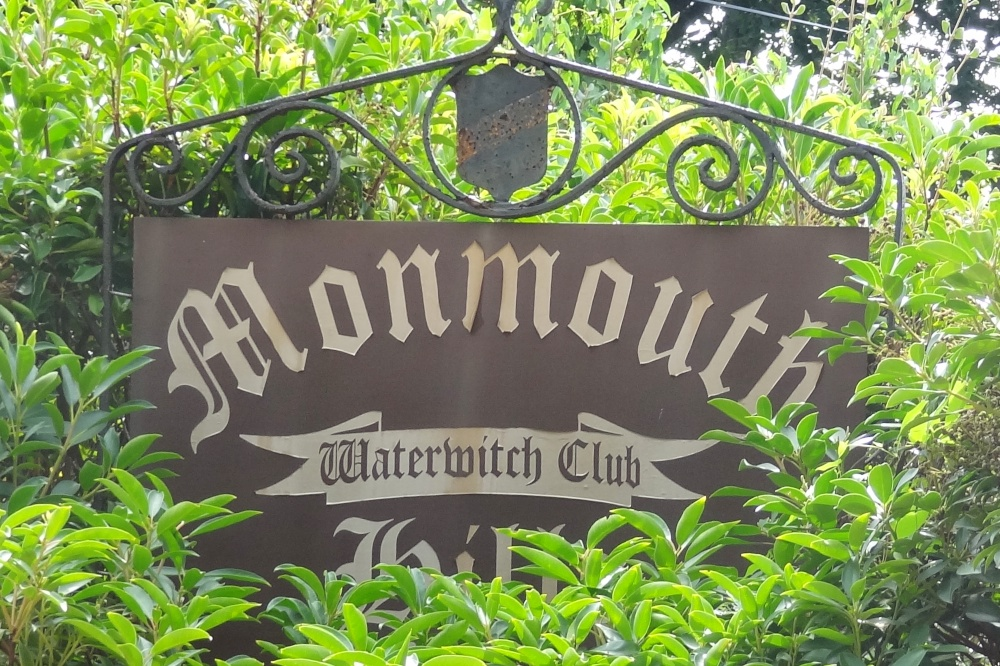
Club sign

== See also ==
- National Register of Historic Places listings in Monmouth County, New Jersey
