= Hunter Wheel =

The Hunter Wheel was a device intended to improve the propulsion of steam-powered ships and evaluated in the middle 1840s. At the time, as ships were transitioning from sail to steam engine power, the understanding of the principles of hydrodynamics and efficient use of steam was in its infancy.

== Concept ==
The vertically mounted paddle wheel, at side or at the stern, was the first propulsion scheme used with steam power, but naval authorities were concerned about the vulnerability of the wheels to damage, whether in combat or peacetime use, and sought to increase the efficiency of ship designs, as the navies of the world began to switch from wooden hulls to iron ones. The only competition to wheel designs was John Ericsson's patent screw, which was just then entering its first trials on USS Princeton (1843)

Lt. William W. Hunter and Benjamin Harris proposed a new wheel design, which consisted of a conventional paddle wheel drum placed horizontally within the vessel, below the water-line. The paddles were so arranged as to project from a suitable opening in the side of the ship, at right angles to the keel. Water was kept from entering by a cofferdam placed around the paddle wheel drum and against the side of the ship.

== USS Union evaluation, 1843 ==
The Hunter wheel was tested in 1843 on the USS Union (1841) which had been modified to accept the device. It was discovered that Union’s engines wasted too much energy uselessly driving the paddle wheels through the water-filled cofferdam inside the ship.

== In USS Water Witch, 1845 ==
Hunter's wheel was also tested in USS Water Witch (1845); again, the wheels lost much of their power pushing water through the encased area inside the hull, forfeiting between 50 and 70 percent of their potential power.

== Revenue cutter George M. Bibb, 1845 ==
Also in 1845, the Revenue Marine ordered a cutter from Knapp's Fort Pitt Foundry with Hunter's wheel, the USRC Bibb (1843), which sank at her moorings in Cincinnati on her trials and was converted to side wheels before entering service.

== Final evaluation on USS Allegheny, 1847 ==
The Hunter design was also used in the construction of USS Allegheny (1847) but it was confirmed as being unreliable and inefficient, and Allegheny was later converted to screw propulsion. This appears to have been the last test of Hunter's wheel.

== See also ==
- Paddle steamer
