= Water Witch Club Historic District =

Historic district in New Jersey, United States

- U.S. National Register of Historic Places
- U.S. Historic district
- New Jersey Register of Historic Places
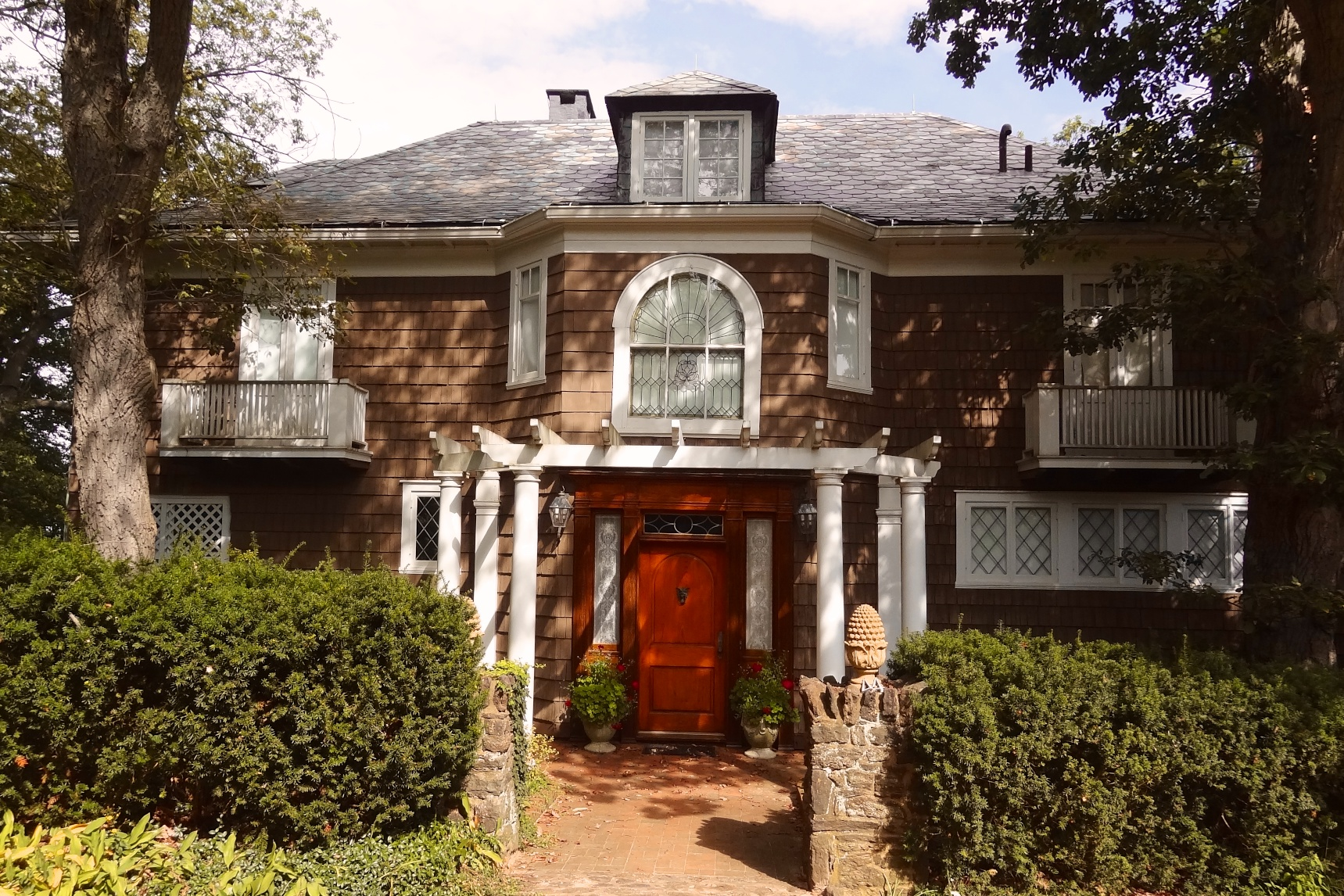
- Lavinia Anna Erbacher House

- Location within Monmouth County, New Jersey Location within New Jersey Location within the United States
- Location: Roughly bounded by NJ 36, Waterwitch Drive, Sea View Terrace, Park Way, Windlass Path and Serpentine Drive, Middletown Township, New Jersey
- Coordinates: 40°24′2″N 73°59′49″W
- Area: 50 acres (20 ha)
- Built: 1895
- Architectural style: Shingle Style, Tudor Revival
- NRHP reference No.: 04000147
- NJRHP No.: 4111

Significant dates
- Added to NRHP: March 12, 2004
- Designated NJRHP: December 24, 2003

The Water Witch Club Historic District is a 50-acre (20 ha) historic district located in the Monmouth Hills section of Middletown Township in Monmouth County, New Jersey, United States. It is near the Waterwitch section of the borough of Highlands. The district was added to the National Register of Historic Places on March 12, 2004, for its significance in architecture, entertainment, landscape architecture, and community planning and development. It has 23 contributing buildings, including the individually listed Water Witch Club Casino.

== History and description ==
The Water Witch Club was founded in 1895 by Ferdinand Fish, a New York City developer. The name comes from The Water-Witch, an 1830 novel by James Fenimore Cooper. The Water Witch Club Casino was built in 1905 and expanded in 1911. The two-story Lavinia Anna Erbacher House, built around 1905, was designed by architect Frederick P. Hill and features Shingle Style and Colonial Revival architecture.

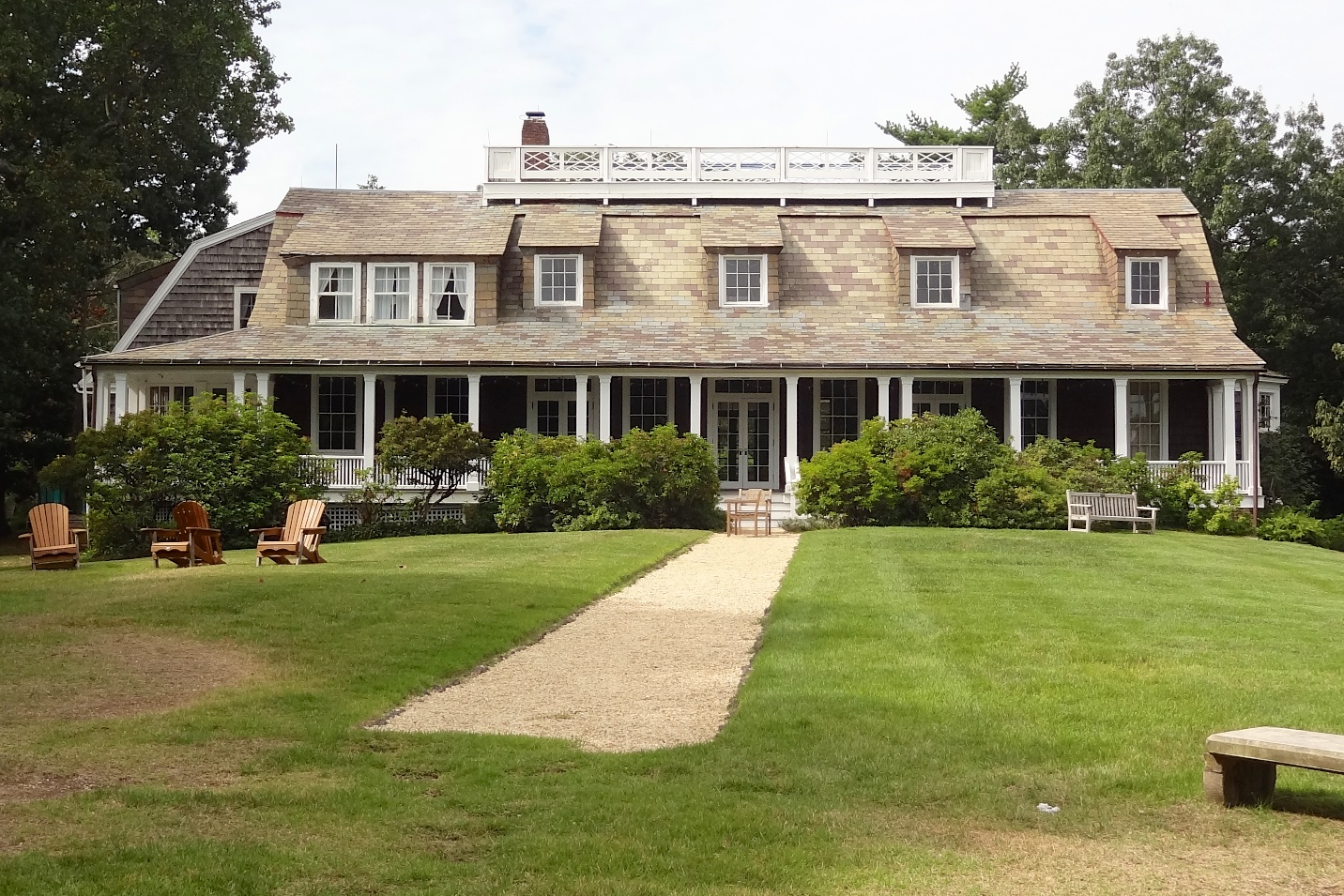
Water Witch Club Casino

== See also ==
- National Register of Historic Places listings in Monmouth County, New Jersey
