= USS Union (1842) =

History

United States
- Laid down: 1841
- Launched: 1842
- Commissioned: early 1843
- Out of service: 1847
- Stricken: 1858 (est.)
- Fate: Sold, 1858

General characteristics
- Displacement: 956 tons
- Length: 184 ft 6 in (56.24 m)
- Beam: 33 ft 6 in (10.21 m)
- Draught: 11 ft 3 in (3.43 m)
- Propulsion: steam engine; side wheel-propelled
- Speed: 7 knots
- Complement: not known
- Armament: four 68-pounder guns

The first USS Union was a steamer designed and constructed by the U.S. Navy as an experimental improved version of its current steam-powered ships which were not considered as efficient as they should be.

Union was laid down at the Norfolk Navy Yard, Portsmouth, Virginia, in 1841; launched in late 1842; and commissioned at Norfolk, Virginia, in early 1843, Lt. W. W. Hunter in command.

== Testing of a new design for propulsion of wheel-powered ships ==
The Navy tested various designs of propulsion machinery during the transition to steam power in the early 19th century. Among these first experiments were Union and Water Witch—each fitted with an innovation named the Hunter Wheel.

The Hunter Wheel was named after Lt. W. W. Hunter and consisted of a conventional paddle wheel drum placed horizontally within the vessel below the water-line. The paddles were so arranged as to project from a suitable opening in the side of the ship when at right angles to the keel. Water was kept from entering by a cofferdam placed around the paddle wheel drum and against the side of the ship.

== Field testing of the Hunter Wheel ==
Union left Norfolk, Virginia, on a trial cruise in February 1843. She stopped at Washington, D.C., Boston, Massachusetts, New York City, and Philadelphia, Pennsylvania, before returning to Norfolk in June. Although both Lt. Hunter and Secretary of the Navy Abel P. Upshur highly praised the vessel, it was later discovered that her engines wasted too much energy uselessly driving the paddle wheels through the water-filled cofferdam inside the ship. Later that year, Union put into the Washington Navy Yard for repairs.

== Continued testing of the device ==
Union joined the Home Squadron in 1844 and conducted a second series of test runs ending in early 1845. She was placed in ordinary at the Washington Navy Yard on 30 February. While she was laid up, it was decided to replace her original engines with ones of greater power. The alterations were completed at Washington in 1846 but failed to increase the efficiency of the paddle wheels. The ship was placed in ordinary at Norfolk as of November 1847.

== Post-testing career of the Union ==
In 1848, Union was sent to the Philadelphia Navy Yard and converted into a receiving ship. Her machinery and paddle wheels were removed at this time and sold. Union remained at Philadelphia as a receiving ship until sold there in 1858.

== See also ==
- United States Navy
- American Civil War
