= List of Russian steam frigates =

List of Russian paddle and screw frigates, corvettes and clippers from 1836–1892.

The format is: Name, number of guns (rank/real amount), launch year, fate (BU = broken up). This list includes only non-armoured vessels.

== Paddle frigates ==
This section contains paddle ships with one opened battery (except Bogatyr) and three or (rarely) two masts. Therefore, they ought to be classified as paddle corvettes or paddle brigs, but all of them (except Amerika) were officially classified as пароходофрегат (parokhodofregat), which means "steamer-frigate."

=== Paddle frigates of the Baltic Fleet (1836–1870) ===
- Bogatyr‘ 28 \ «Богатырь» (1836) - BU 1857
- Kamchatka 18 \ «Камчатка» (1840, New York) - Decommissioned 1866
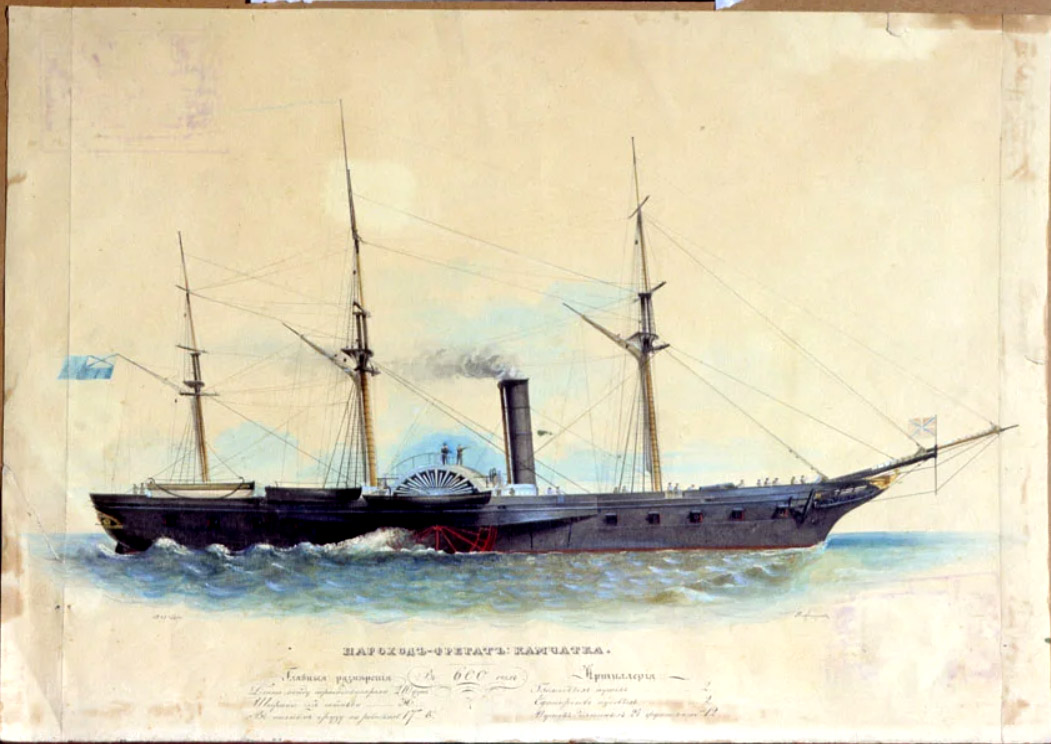
  Russian paddle frigate Kamchatka (1841).
- Hercules 22 \ «Геркулес» (1831) - Until 1843 classified as steamboat, reconstruct and reclassified as paddle frigate in 1843, BU 1854
- Otvazhny 4 \ «Отважный» (1843) - Decommissioned 1861
- Smely 14 \ «Смелый» (1844) - BU 1860
- Khrabry 4 \ «Храбрый» (1844) - BU 1856
- Grozyaschy 4 \ «Грозящий» (1844) - Hulked 1863, decommissioned 1866
- Ryurik 4 \ «Рюрик» (1851, Turku) - 1. Finnish naval equipage, voyaged to the Mediterranean Sea 1858–1859, decommissioned 1870
- Gremyaschii 4 \ «Гремящий» (1851) - Wrecked 1862
- Olaf 18 \ «Олаф» (1852), Helsinki - 2. Finnish naval equipage, voyaged to the Mediterranean Sea 1856–1859, decommissioned 1892
- Khrabry 8 \ «Храбрый» (1858) - Decommissioned 1881
- Smely 8 \ «Смелый» (1858) - Decommissioned 1880
- Solombala 8 \ «Соломбала» (1859) - Until 1862 belonged to White Sea Flotilla, decommissioned 1875
- Ryurik 3 \ «Рюрик» (1870) - Decommissioned 1890

=== Paddle frigates of the Black Sea Fleet (1843–1848) ===
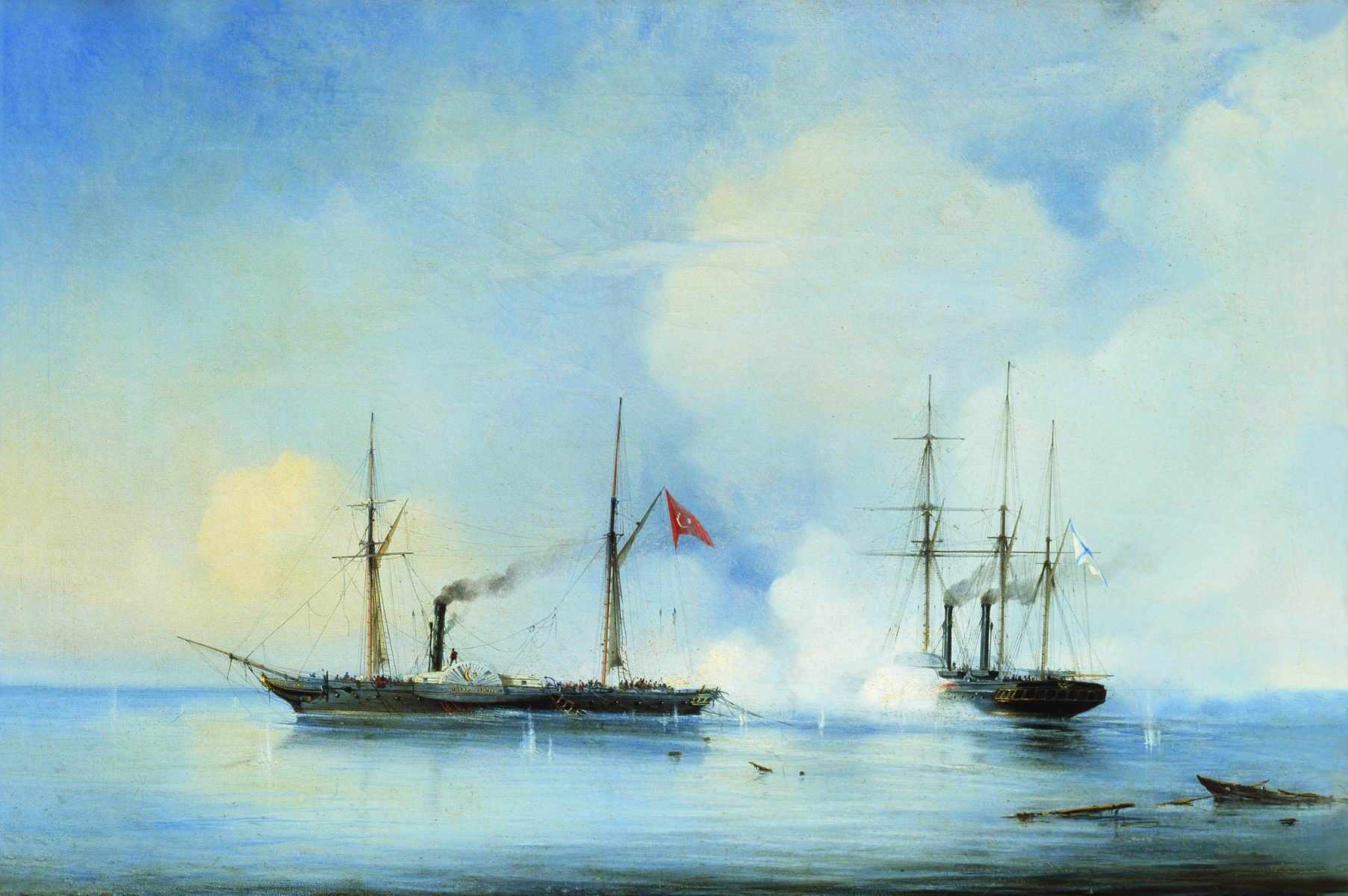
Action between Russian steam frigate Vladimir (right) and Turkish steam frigate Pervaz-i Bahri of 5 November 1853

- Khersones 4 \ «Херсонес» (1843, British-built for Russia) - Scuttled in Sevastopol in 1855, when Russian troops abandoned the city
- Bessarabia 6 \ «Бессарабия» (1843, British-built for Russia) - Scuttled in Sevastopol in 1855, when Russian troops abandoned the city
- Krym 4 \ «Крым» (1843, British-built for Russia) - Scuttled in Sevastopol in 1855, when Russian troops abandoned the city
- Odessa 4 \ «Одесса» (1843, British-built for Russia) - Scuttled in Sevastopol in 1855, when Russian troops abandoned the city
- Gromonosets 6 \ «Громоносец» (1843, British-built for Russia) - Flagship of Vice-Admiral Vladimir Kornilov during the Crimean War. Scuttled in Sevastopol in 1855, when Russian troops abandoned the city
- Vladimir 14 \ «Владимир» (1848, London) - Won the first action between steamships in the world when it captured the Turkish steam frigate Pervaz-i Bahri (1853). Scuttled in Sevastopol in 1855, when Russian troops abandoned the city

=== Paddle corvette of the Siberian Flotilla ===
The only one ship of this type served here.

- Amerika 8 \ «Америка» (1857, New York) (classified as steam corvette\пароходокорвет) - Consisted of Japanese diplomatic mission of Vice-Admiral Count Yevfimy Putyatin, flagship of Count Nikolay Muravyov-Amursky in 1859, took part of Vladivostok's foundation (1859), decommissioned 1883

== Screw frigates ==
All of them belonged to the Baltic Fleet in 1848–1892.

- Arkhimed 48/13 \ «Архимед» (1848) - First Russian screw ship, wrecked 1850
- Polkan 44 \ «Полкан» (1853) - The only Russian screw warship at the beginning of the Crimean War, served at the Mediterranean Sea 1856–1859, scuttled to protect Kronstadt harbour 1863, steam engine reused in Variag (1862).
- Askold \ «Аскольд» (ex-Maria \ «Мария» - renamed on slip) 46 (1854) - Served at the Northern Pacific 1857–1860 consisting of Japanese diplomatic mission of Vice-Admiral Count Yevfimy Putyatin, BU 1861

=== Ilya Muromets-class (2 units) ===
- Ilya Muromets 53 \ «Илья Муромец» (1856) - Voyaged to the Mediterranean Sea 1859–1860, scuttled to protect Kronstadt harbour 1863
- Gromoboi 53 \ «Громобой» (1857, Helsinki) - Voyaged to the Mediterranean Sea 1858–1859 & 1860–1861, training ship 1864, decommissioned 1872
- General Admiral 70/64 \ «Генерал-адмирал» (1858, New York) - Strongest Russian open-sea warship in 1858–1869, served at the Mediterranean Sea in 1860–1861 and 1863–1867, BU 1870
- Svetlana \ «Светлана» (1858, Bordeaux) - Served at the Mediterranean Sea in 1859–1860 and at the Northern Pacific 1860–1862, visited Brazil 1867–1868, voyaged to USA and Japan 1871–1873, voyaged Mediterranean Sea 1875–1877, training ship 1878, decommissioned 1892

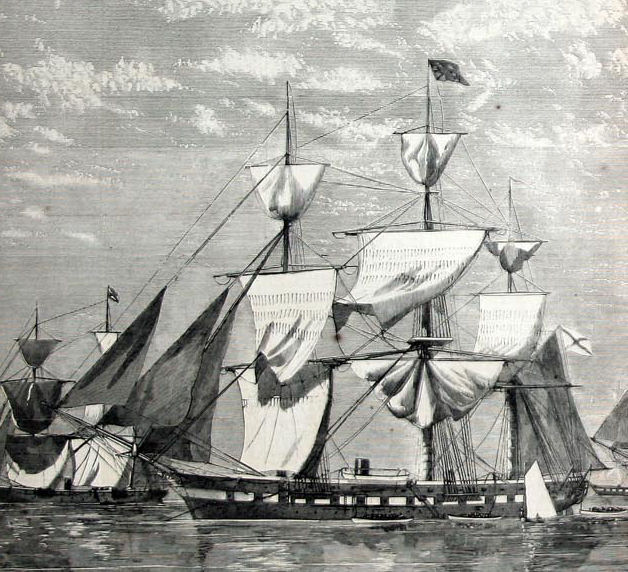
The Alexander Nevsky in New York Harbor, 1863. Detail from an illustration in Harper's Weekly.

- Oslyabya 45/35 \ «Ослябя» (1860) - Served at the Mediterranean Sea in 1861–1863 and in 1864, visited U.S.A. with Vice-Admiral Stepan Lesovsky's diplomatic mission 1863–1864, armed with 8-inch rifled guns 1866, decommissioned 1874
- Oleg 57 \ «Олег» (1860) - Served at the Mediterranean Sea in 1860–1861 and in 1863–1865, sank over collision 1869
- Peresvet 51 \ «Пересвет» (1860) - Visited U.S.A. with Vice-Admiral Stepan Lesovsky's diplomatic mission 1863–1864, served at the Mediterranean Sea 1865–1866, decommissioned 1874

=== Dmitry Donskoy-class (2 units) ===
- Dmitry Donskoy 50 \ «Дмитрий Донской» (1861) - Visited Brazil 1867–1868, decommissioned 1872
- Alexander Nevsky 50 \ «Александр Невский» (1861) - Flagship of Vice-Admiral Stepan Lesovsky during the diplomatic mission at U.S.A. 1863–1864, served at the Mediterranean Sea 1867–1868, wrecked at Skagerrak 1868

== Screw corvettes ==
=== Screw corvettes of the Baltic Fleet (1856–1892) ===
==== Boyarin-class (14 units in all, 8 at the Baltic Sea) ====
Displacement 885 tons.

- Boyarin 11 \ «Боярин» (1856) - First steamship, that circumnavigated the world 1857–1860 (consisting of squadron), rearmed by rifled guns 1871, converted to sail training ship 1870-th, decommissionrd 1893
- Novik 11 \ «Новик» (1856) - Served at Northern Pacific 1857–1860 & 1861–1863, visited San Francisco (U.S.A.) consisting of Rear Admiral Andrey Popov's diplomatic mission 1863, wrecked near San Francisco 1863
- Medved‘ 11 \ «Медведь» (1856) - Served at Mediterranean Sea 1858–1860, laid up 1862, decommissioned 1863
- Posadnik 11 \ «Посадник» (1856) - Served at Northern Pacific 1859–1862, decommissioned 1871
- Griden‘ 11 \ «Гридень» (1856) - Served at Northern Pacific 1858–1862, decommissioned 1883
- Voyevoda 11 \ «Воевода» (1856) - Served at Northern Pacific 1857–1860, rearmed by rifled guns 1876, decommissioned 1887
- Vol 11 \ «Вол» (1856) - Laid up 1866, decommissioned and hulked as floating barracks 1867
- Rynda 11 \ «Рында» (1856) - Served at Northern Pacific 1858–1860 & 1861–1864, visited San Francisco (U.S.A.) consisting of Rear Admiral Andrey Popov's diplomatic mission 1863–1864, decommissioned 1871

==== Bayan and Kalevala ====
- Bayan 18 \ «Баян» (1857, Bordeaux) - Served at Mediterranean Sea 1858–1860 and Northern Pacific 1874–1878, rearmed by rifled guns 1873, decommissioned 1889
- Kalevala 19 \ «Калевала» (1858, Turku) - Served at Northern Pacific 1860–1864, flagship of Rear Admiral Andrey Popov's diplomatic mission at San Francisco (U.S.A.) 1863–1864, decommissioned 1872

==== Bogatyr-class (4 units) ====
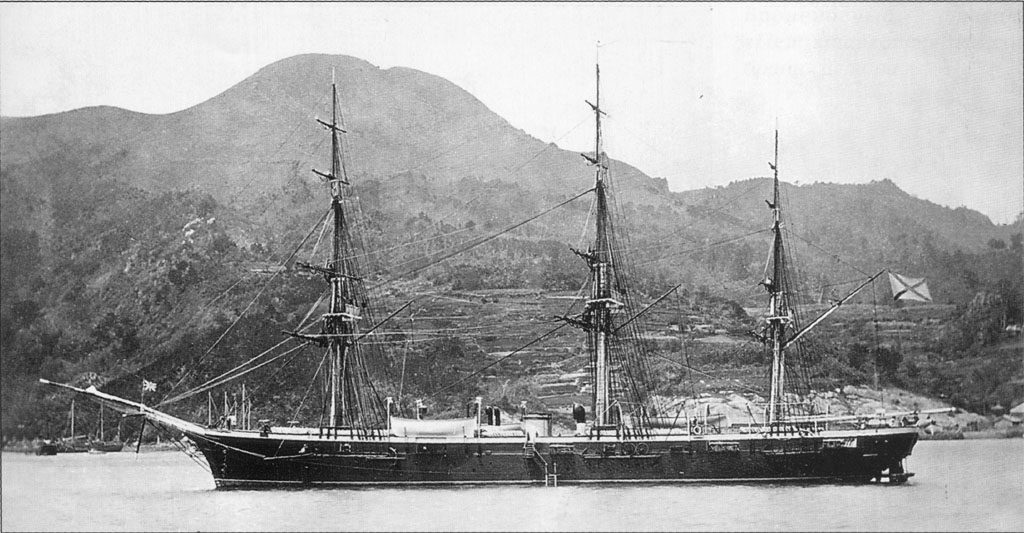
The Vityaz‘ somewhere in the Far East

- Bogatyr 18 \ «Богатырь» (1860) - Served at Northern Pacific and visited San Francisco (U.S.A.) consisting of Rear Admiral Andrey Popov's diplomatic mission 1863–1864, rearmed by rifled guns 1870, served at Mediterranean Sea 1876–1877, hulked 1888, BU 1900
- Varyag 18/17 \ «Варяг» (1862, Oulu) - Visited U.S.A. with Vice-Admiral Stepan Lesovsky's diplomatic mission 1863–1864, served at Mediterranean Sea until 1867, rearmed by rifled guns 1870, training ship late 1870s, decommissioned 1886
- Vityaz 18/17 \ «Витязь» (1862, Pori) - Visited U.S.A. with Vice-Admiral Stepan Lesovsky's diplomatic mission 1863–1864, served at Mediterranean Sea 1864 and Pacific Ocean 1870–1874, rearmed by rifled guns 1871, renamed Skobelev \ «Скобелев» 1882, training ship 1892, hulked 1895
- Askold 18/17 \ «Аскольд» (1863) - Served at Northern Pacific 1864–1867 & 1872–1876, at Mediterranean Sea 1868–1869 and Atlantic Ocean 1876–1878, rearmed by rifled guns 1872, training ships early 1880s, decommissioned 1883

==== Late training ships for naval cadets ====
- Moryak 10 \ «Моряк» (1892) - Decommissioned 1907
- Voin 9 \ «Воин» (1893) - Renamed Trefolev \ «Трефолев» 1923, converted to mother-ship 1929, BU after 1945
- Verny 11 \ «Верный» (1895) - Renamed Petrosovet \ «Петросовет 1922, Leningradsovet \ «Ленинградсовет» 1924, converted to mother-ship 1941, returned to training ships in 1944, to mother-ships in 1948, BU in 1950th

=== Screw corvettes of the Black Sea Flotilla (1856–1865) ===
==== Boyarin-class (last 6 units) ====
- Udav 9/11 \ «Удав» (1856) - Transferred from Baltic Sea, decommissioned 1869
- Rys‘ 9/11 \ «Рысь» (1856) - Transferred from Baltic Sea, decommissioned 1866
- Zubr 9/11 \ «Зубр» (1856) - Transferred from Baltic Sea, decommissioned 1869
- Volk 9/11 \ «Волк» (1856) - Transferred from Baltic Sea, decommissioned 1866
- Vepr‘ 9/11 \ «Вепрь» (1856) - Transferred from Baltic Sea, decommissioned 1866
- Buivol 9/11 \ «Буйвол» (1856) - Transferred from Baltic Sea, decommissioned 1866

==== Voin ====
- Voin 20/4 \ «Воин» (1859) - Classified as steam transport 1859–1871, rearmed by rifled guns by 1877, decommissioned 1891

==== Sokol-class (3 units) ====
- Sokol 9/11 \ «Сокол» (1859) - Belonged to the Baltic Fleet 1861–1863, served at Mediterranean Sea 1863–1864, rearmed by rifled guns 1877, decommissioned 1893
- Yastreb 9 \ «Ястреб» (1860) - Rearmed by rifled guns in late 1860s, decommissioned 1871
- Krechet 9 \ «Кречет» (1860) - Rearmed by rifled guns in late 1860s, decommissioned 1871

==== Pamyat Merkuriya-class (2 units) ====
- Pamyat Merkuriya 11 \ «Память Меркурия» (1865) - Rearmed by rifled guns by 1875, decommissioned 1893
- Lvitsa 11 \ «Львица» (1865) - Rearmed by rifled guns by 1875, decommissioned 1893

== Screw clippers ==
This type of light seagoing cruisers was invented by Russians. All of them first belonged to the Baltic Fleet and served in 1856–1900s (decade), some were later transferred to the Siberian Flotilla (based on Nikolayevsk, since 1872 — on Vladivostok, since 1898 — on Port Arthur).

=== Razboinik-class (6 units) ===
Displacement 615 tons.

- Razboinik 6/3 \ «Разбойник» (1856) - First of the world clipper-of-war, served at Northern Pacific 1857–c.1861, decommissioned 1867
- Strelok 6/3 \ «Стрелок» (1856) - Served at Northern Pacific 1858–1862, decommissioned 1878
- Dzhigit 6/3 \ «Джигит» (1856) - Served at Northern Pacific 1857–1861, decommissioned 1867, sunk as target 1869, found by divers 2002
- Oprichnik 6/3 \ «Опричник» (1856) - Served at Northern Pacific 1858–1861, lost in Indian Ocean 1861
- Nayezdnik 6/3 \ «Наездник» (1856) - Served at Northern Pacific 1859–c.1861, decommissioned 1867, sunk as target 1869
- Plastun 6/3 \ «Пластун» (1856) - Served at Northern Pacific 1857–1860, sunk by ammunition explosion 1860 (73 men lost)

=== Gaidamak ===
- Gaidamak 7 \ «Гайдамак» (1860, British-built for Russia) - Served at Northern Pacific 1860–1864 and 1875–1877, visited San Francisco (U.S.A.) consisting of Rear Admiral Andrey Popov's diplomatic mission 1863–1864, rearmed by rifled guns 1871, decommissioned 1886

=== Abrek-class (2 units) ===
- Abrek 5 \ «Абрек» (1860, Pori) - Served at Northern Pacific 1860–1864 & 1871–1877 and 1880s, visited San Francisco (U.S.A.) consisting of Rear Admiral Andrey Popov's diplomatic mission 1863–1864, decommissioned and hulked 1892
- Vsadnik 5 \ «Всадник» (1860, Pori) - Transferred to Siberian Flotilla 1862, served at Northern Pacific 1868–1871 &1873–1877, rearmed by rifled guns 1868, decommissioned 1881

=== Almaz-class (4 units) ===
- Almaz 7 \ «Алмаз» (1861) - Visited U.S.A. with Vice-Admiral Stepan Lesovsky's diplomatic mission 1863–1864, rearmed by rifled guns 1871, decommissioned 1881
- Zhemchug 7 \ «Жемчуг» (1861) - Rearmed rifled guns 1871, rearmed torpedo tubes and converted to training ship, decommissioned 1892
- Izumrud 7 \ «Изумруд» (1862) - Circumnavigated in 1865–1867 & 1870–1873, rearmed by rifled guns 1871, decommissioned 1886
- Yakhont 7 \ «Яхонт» (1862) - Served at Mediterranean Sea late 1860s, rearmed by rifled guns 1871, decommissioned 1881

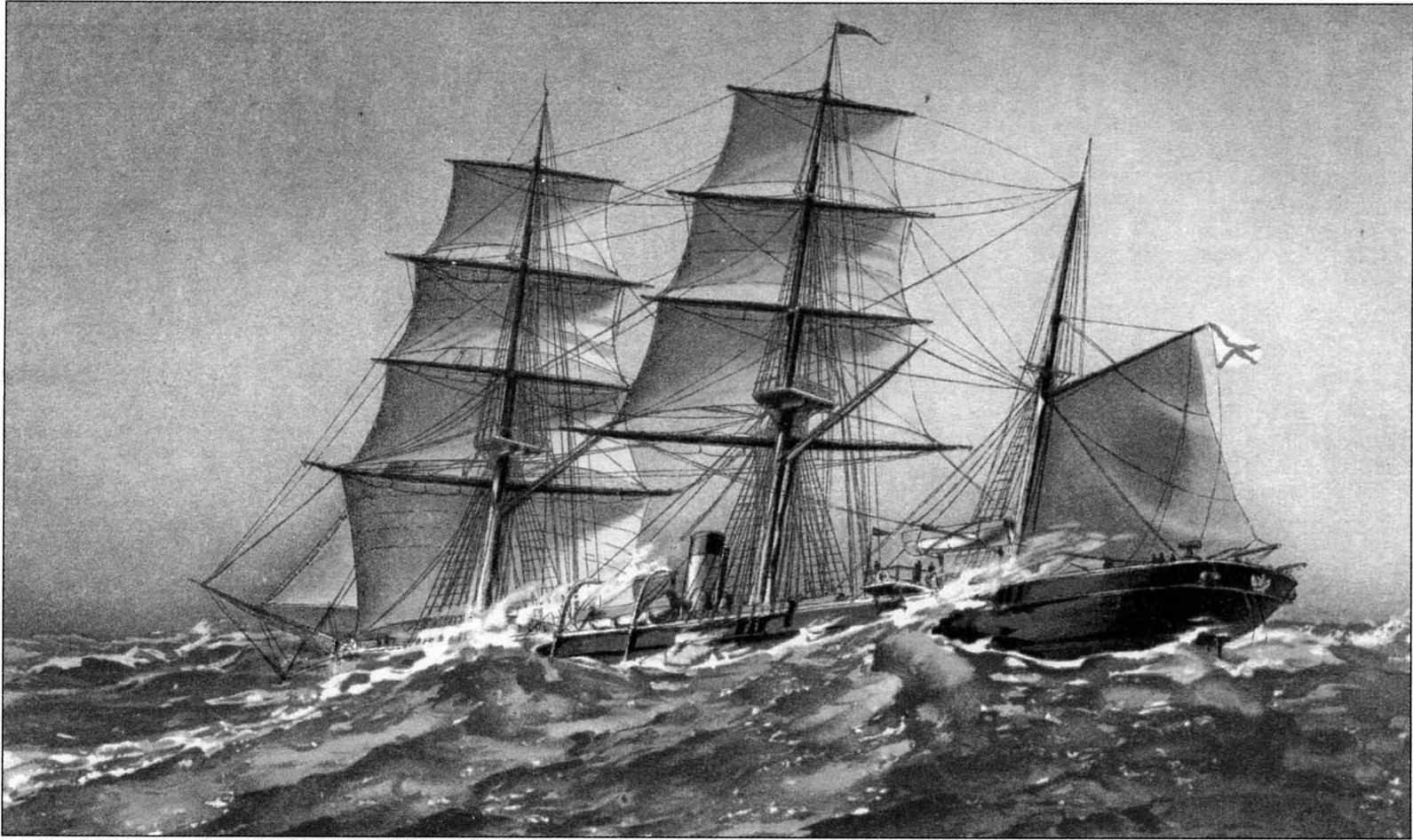
Screw clipper Razboinik (1878) under sail. Drawing by Lieutenant Vasily V. Ignatsius

=== Kreiser-class (8 units) ===
The "swan song" of outgoing-era sailing fleet:

- Kreiser 7 \ «Крейсер» (1875) - 2nd naval equipage. Served at Mediterranean Sea 1876–1877 & 1891 and Northern Pacific 1879–1880, 1885–1886, 1889-1891 & 1894–1899, reclassified to Cruiser of 2nd rank 1892, training ship 1906, hulked 1911, BU 1924
- Dzhigit 7 \ «Джигит» (1876) - 5th naval equipage. Served at Atlantic Ocean 1878, Mediterranean Sea 188 & 1884 and Northern Pacific 1879–1881, 1885–1886, 1890–1891 and since 1903, reclassified to Cruiser of 2nd rank 1892, and Barents Sea 1895, transferred to Siberian Flotilla 1903, scuttled at Port Arthur 1904
- Razboinik 7 \ «Разбойник» (1878) - 2nd (late 18th) naval equipage. Served at Northern Pacific 1880-1881, 1884–1889, 1893–95 & since 1899, Cruiser of 2nd rank 1892, transferred to Siberian Flotilla 1902, scuttled at Port Arthur 1904
- Nayezdnik 7 \ «Наездник» (1878) - 3rd naval equipage. Served at Northern Pacific in 1880-1881, 1883-1884 & 1887-1888, at Mediterranean Sea 1882, and at Barents Sea 1893, Cruiser of 2nd Rank 1892, decommissioned 1902
- Strelok 7 \ «Стрелок» (1879) - 2nd naval equipage (since 1883 Guards naval equipage). Served at Northern Pacific 1880–1882 and Mediterranean Sea 1884–1888, Cruiser of 2nd Rank 1892, training ship 1899, decommissioned 1907, BU after 1916
- Plastun 7 \ «Пластун» (1879) - 5th naval equipage. Served at Northern Pacific 1880–1882, and Mediterranean Sea 1884–1885, Cruiser of 2nd Rank 1892, decommissioned 1907
- Vestnik 7 \ «Вестник» (1880) - 5th (late 9th) naval equipage. Served at Northern Pacific 1881–1882, at Mediterranean Sea 1896-1898, and Barents Sea 1894-1895, Cruiser of 2nd Rank 1892, decommissioned 1906
- Oprichnik 6 \ «Опричник» (1880) - 4th naval equipage. Served at Northern Pacific 1884-1886, and Mediterranean Sea 1881, Cruiser of 2nd Rank 1892, training ship 1897, decommissioned 1907
