= USS Water Witch (1847) =

History

United States
- Commissioned: 21 August 1847
- Decommissioned: 25 April 1851
- Fate: Expended as a target ship

General characteristics
- Displacement: 255 tons
- Length: 131 ft (40 m)
- Beam: 21 ft 10 in (6.65 m)
- Draft: 7 ft 3 in (2.21 m)
- Propulsion: steam engine; side wheel-propelled
- Speed: 9 knots (17 km/h; 10 mph)
- Complement: 54
- Armament: 1 × 8 in (203 mm) shell gun; 2 × 32-pounder guns

USS Water Witch was a steamer in the service of the United States Navy. She participated in the Mexican–American War which lasted from 1846 to 1848.

== Service history ==
The second Water Witch was a modification of the hull of the first USS Water Witch (1845). She entered the Philadelphia Navy Yard late in 1845; had her hull lengthened by some 30 feet; and had all her machinery removed and replaced with a new power plant to drive a Loper propeller. However, that configuration, after some months of experimentation, also proved unsatisfactory and; in 1847, she again traded her propulsion plant for an inclined condensing engine driving conventional side-wheels. She probably was not finally commissioned until 21 August 1847, Lt. George M. Totten in command.

The war with Mexico took her to blockade duty in the Gulf of Mexico where she arrived late in October 1847. At Anton Lizardo, Veracruz, she joined the squadron under Commodore Matthew C. Perry. Late in November and early in December, she cruised to reconnoiter the Veracruz ports of Alvarado and Coatzacoalcos, along the coast of Tabasco, and north to the ports of Ciudad del Carmen, Campeche, and Cd. Campeche in company with Mississippi and Scorpion. She served with the blockading forces in the Gulf of Mexico through the end of the U.S.–Mexican War in February 1848.

Thereafter, Water Witch served in American waters with the Home Squadron. Her much repaired hull prevented her from seeing overseas service, but her career continued until 1851. During the spring of that year, she sailed from Norfolk, Virginia, on a coastal voyage but broke down on her first day out and was towed back to port. She was placed out of commission on 25 April 1851. Her machinery was removed at Washington for use in the third Water Witch, and her hull became a target for gunnery practice
