= Bibbs =

Bibbs is a surname of English origin, a variant of Bibb, which is derived from a pet form of the given name Isabel. Notable people with the surname include:

- E. J. Bibbs (born 1991), American football player
- Junius Bibbs (1910–1980), American baseball player
- Justin Bibbs (born 1996), American basketball player
- Kapri Bibbs (born 1993), American football player
