= USS Allegheny (1847) =

Gunboat of the United States Navy

History

United States
- Name: USS Allegheny
- Ordered: October 1843
- Builder: Stackhouse and Tomlinson
- Laid down: 1844 at Pittsburgh, Pennsylvania
- Launched: 22 February 1847
- Commissioned: 22 February 1847
- Decommissioned: 1868 (est.)
- Refit: 1851-1852 at Gosport Navy Yard
- Stricken: 1868 (est.)
- Homeport: Baltimore, Maryland
- Fate: Sold, 15 May 1869

General characteristics
- Type: Steamer
- Displacement: 989 long tons (1,005 t)
- Length: 185 ft (56 m)
- Beam: 33 ft 4 in (10.16 m)
- Draft: 13 ft 6 in (4.11 m)
- Depth of hold: 19 ft (5.8 m)
- Propulsion: Steam engine; dual horizontal wheel-propelled (converted to single screw ca. 1852)
- Speed: 4.9 kn (5.6 mph; 9.1 km/h)
- Complement: 190 officers and enlisted
- Armament: 4 × 68-pounder guns; 6 × 32-pounder guns
- Armor: Iron-hulled

USS Allegheny – the first United States Navy ship to be so named – was a large (989 long tons (1,005 t)) iron-hulled steamer that served as an American gunboat in the South Atlantic Ocean as well as in the European area. When the American Civil War occurred, Allegheny served the Union cause honorably, doing her part by supporting the Union Navy – because of her large size and operational condition – as a receiving ship.

Allegheny was somewhat different from other gunboats of the time as she was propelled by two eight-bladed horizontal wheels invented by Lieutenant William W. Hunter. Eventually this design proved impractical, and Allegheny was rebuilt as a conventional screw steamer.

== Launched in Pennsylvania in 1847 ==
Allegheny was laid down at Pittsburgh, Pennsylvania sometime in 1844 prior to 11 November by Joseph Tomlinson and Company; built under the supervision of Lt. Hunter, launched on 22 February 1847; and commissioned the same day, Lt. Hunter in command.

The naval steamer soon departed Pittsburgh and arrived at Memphis, Tennessee on 1 March. She remained there until her 3 June fitting out, and reached New Orleans, Louisiana on the 12th for more work before sailing for the east coast on 26 August. After her arrival at Norfolk, Virginia on 16 October, her wheels were modified by the removal of every other paddle, leaving each with four.

== South Atlantic operations ==
On 26 February 1848, Allegheny departed Hampton Roads and headed south for service on the Brazil station. She served along the Atlantic Coast of South America until early autumn when the sloop of war St. Louis arrived with orders sending the steamer to the Mediterranean Sea.

== European operations ==
Earlier that year, the fall of Louis Philippe from the throne of France had triggered a series of revolutions which shook Europe for the remainder of the decade, and Allegheny was charged with showing the American flag and affording protection to American citizens during this time of unrest. However, repeated problems with her engines caused her to head home in June 1849; and she reached the Washington Navy Yard on 1 August.

== Design problems delay operations ==
Following a fortnight's repairs, the ship sailed for the Mississippi passes to join the Home Squadron. However, continued failures with her propulsion system cut short her duty in the Gulf of Mexico; and she returned to Washington where she was placed in ordinary.

In 1851, Allegheny was towed to Portsmouth, Virginia, where the firm of Mehaffy and Company removed her Hunter Wheels and rebuilt her as a screw steamer. She was slated to join Commodore Matthew C. Perry's expedition which sailed for the Far East in November 1852, but failed to pass sea trials and – instead of helping to open Japan to the outside world – was placed back in ordinary at Washington, D.C.

Four years later, the ship was fitted out for service as a receiving ship; and she was taken to Baltimore, Maryland where she took up this new role. She was still there and, surprisingly, again under the command of her designer, William W. Hunter – now a commander – when the Civil War broke out in mid-April 1861.

== Civil War service ==
President Abraham Lincoln answered the Southern attack on Fort Sumter, South Carolina, by calling out ". . . the militia of the several states ... to suppress ..." the rebellion.

This move alienated many undecided citizens of the border states, prompting Virginia to secede from the Union and pushing Maryland dangerously close to withdrawing. These developments left both Washington, D.C., the Federal capital, and Norfolk, Virginia, the home of the Nation's most important naval base, isolated and all but defenseless.

=== Union ships trapped at Norfolk ===
Moreover, several important American warships were then in the Norfolk Navy Yard in varying stages of disrepair. Wishing to withdraw these men-of-war to safer waters, the Navy Department scoured Northern coastal cities for seamen to reactivate and to man them so that they might be moved out of immediate danger of falling into Confederate hands.

Thus, on 18 April, Secretary of the Navy Gideon Welles wired Hunter to

. . . draft fifty recruits, in charge of two officers for the receiving ship Pennsylvania, at Norfolk, to be sent by this evening's boat.

Hunter obtained the men; but, when he attempted to send them to Norfolk the following day, the Baltimore Steam Packet Company refused to embark them. This same day, 19 April, a violently pro-Southern mob in Baltimore, Maryland, attacked the 6th Massachusetts Regiment as it was moving between railroad stations on its journey to Washington to defend the Federal capital, thereafter known as the Baltimore riot of 1861.

=== Scuttling Union ships at Norfolk ===
On the next day, 20 April, since they were unable to man and move most of the Federal warships in the Norfolk Navy Yard, Federal naval authorities there abandoned, scuttled, or burned all but three of these desperately needed vessels as they put the torch to the yard and fled. The former ship of the line Pennsylvania – with no crew to get her underway – was among the vessels which went up in flames and was burned to her waterline.

=== Saving Allegheny from destruction ===
The situation in Baltimore was so unstable that, on the 22nd, Welles ordered Hunter to hire a tugboat to assist Allegheny across the harbor to Fort McHenry where she would be moored under the protection of Federal guns. Once this had been accomplished, Hunter was to send the tug to Annapolis, Maryland under "... a trusty officer ..." to carry the men originally recruited for Pennsylvania and deliver them to the commanding officer of Constitution.

That venerable and revered former frigate was then serving on the Severn River as a midshipmen schoolship. According to the Naval Academy historian, "Old Ironsides", as the veteran man-of-war was affectionately called,

... was fast aground at high water, the only channel through which she could be taken was narrow and difficult, and she was in easy range of any battery which might be installed on the neighboring height.

To make matters worse, almost no seamen were on board to man and refloat the frigate or to defend the ship from pro-Southern attackers, if it proved impossible to work her free. However, on the following day, when Hunter attempted to hire a tug to carry out this order, he learned that the city's mayor and board of police had issued an order forbidding the use of any steamers in Baltimore harbor "... without the permit of the board of police." Hunter then immediately applied for such a permit, but his request was denied on the grounds that

. . . nothing would more certainly increase that excitement to an uncontrollable pitch than any movement about the harbor and in the adjacent waters at this moment of a steamboat in the service of the United States.

Sometime between 23 and 26 April, Hunter – who had been born in Louisiana – resigned his commission as a commander in the United States Navy and joined the Confederacy. On the latter day, Welles ordered Cdr. Daniel B. Ridgely – who had recently succeeded Hunter in command of Allegheny

. . . to get the steamer Allegheny out of the harbor of Baltimore . . . [and] if it can be done, [to] employ a tug to tow her to Annapolis. If you cannot procure a tug for this purpose, you will transfer the recruits by any practical means to Annapolis, with orders to report to Capt. George S. Blake.

=== Allegheny escapes, reaches Annapolis ===
On 1 May, Ridgely attempted to have Allegheny towed to Annapolis in compliance with his orders, but rough water and a useless rudder frustrated his plans. Instead, Allegheny moored at Fort McHenry. Ridgely transferred his recruits – by then 70 in number – to the lighthouse schooner Delaware for passage to Annapolis. Allegheny herself finally reached Annapolis on 3 May to be in position to help to protect that city which had become the principal port of debarkation for troops sent from the North to defend Washington. There she took over the defensive role formerly assigned Constitution which had recently sailed for Newport, Rhode Island, with the Naval Academy midshipmen.

=== Service as a receiving ship ===
During the ensuing month, she remained at Annapolis protecting the port and acting as the receiving ship at that port. Late in the year, after conditions in Maryland had stabilized, Allegheny returned to Baltimore where she resumed her duty as receiving ship. After continuing this service through the end of the Civil War, she was moved to Norfolk, Virginia in 1868.

== Post-war deactivation and sale ==
She was sold at auction there on 15 May 1869 to a Sam Ward. No record of her subsequent career has been found.

== See also ==
- Hunter wheel
- Union Navy
- Confederate States Navy
