= Grace C. Bibb =

- Born: 1842
- Died: 1912 (aged 69–70)
- Occupation: Dean of College of Normal Instruction; University of Missouri
- Subject: education, philosophy, feminism
- Spouse: Thomas Sudborough

Grace C. Bibb (1842–1912) was a teacher, writer, feminist and philosopher. She pushed for equality between the sexes. She was an active member of the St. Louis Hegelian Circle and the St. Louis Philosophical Society. She often corresponded with William Torrey Harris, who is generally considered the leader of the St. Louis philosophy circle. She was appointed as the first female Dean at the Normal school of the University of Missouri from 1878 until 1883. She published many articles on the subjects of education and philosophy.

== Career ==
Bibb was a member of the Pedagogical Society and the State Teachers' and National Education associations. She was also a member of the Kant Club and attended the Concord School of Philosophy. She wrote feminist articles for the Journal of Education, JSP, and The Western Review. Her article "Women as Teachers" expressed some of her early feminist ideas as well as the impact women have on education.

Women were not officially recognized as members of the St. Louis Philosophical Society, although they frequently attended its meetings and contributed both original articles and translations. While Bibb could not officially join, she was often recorded as being in attendance at meetings.

Between 1879 and 1888 Bibb made the pilgrimage to Massachusetts each year to attend lectures at the Concord Summer School of Philosophy and Literature. She helped communicate philosophical ideas to a broad audience — primarily in education and other professional circles

As a member of the Normal School Association, she often presented papers at association meetings, allowing her to reach a broader audience than many of her female colleagues. This professional exposure led her to the position of dean of the College of Normal Instruction at the University of Missouri at Columbia

Bibb was appointed as the first female dean of the College of Normal Instruction at the University of Missouri in September 1878 for an annual salary of $2,000. She served as head of the College of Normal Instruction until 1883.

In 1879 she gave a public lecture titled "Arnold of Rugby" on Thomas Arnold.

Bibb married Thomas Sudborough in 1884 and moved to Nebraska.

After her marriage she turned to reading and writing about Jean-Jacques Rousseau, whose work she had taught while at the University of Missouri. Harris suggested that Bibb might publish her work in JSP or contribute to his International Education Series. However, Harris later abandoned the idea without explanation.

== Work experience ==
- Illinois High School* location unknown, high school teacher
- Illinois Normal School, (1870–71), assistant principal
- St. Louis City Schools, (1872), high school teacher
- St. Louis Normal School, (1873–77), assistant principal
- Dean, University Of Missouri Normal College, 1878–1883
- Omaha Normal School (1890), principal
- Omaha High School, high school teacher, 1898–1911 (history, mathematics, physiology, physical geography-geology)

== Leadership roles ==
- Member, Illinois State Teachers Association, 1866
- NEA Missouri vice-president, 1879–80
- NEA officer, 1881–1882
- NEA Missouri State Manager, 1876–77, 1882–83
- NEA secretary for Louisville, 1877
- NEA secretary for Philadelphia Department of Normal Schools, 1879
- NEA Missouri state director, 1881–82
- President of The Society of Child Study, Library Association of Nebraska, 1896
- Officer of library committee of the Omaha Women’s Club, 1897
- Omaha Women’s Club leader, 1900
- Omaha Women’s Club leader, Department of History, 1901

== Publications and achievements ==
=== Published articles ===
- "The Training to Citizenship," Illinois Teacher, November 1869
- "In the Vineyard," Illinois Teacher, December 1870
- "Course of Study of High Schools," Illinois Teacher, 1871
- "Women as Teachers," Journal of Education (St. Louis), 1873
- "The Theatre in Blackfriars," The Western Review, February 1875
- "Lady Macbeth," The Western Review, May 1875
- "Avenues into which Our Work Leads Us," The Western Review, December 1875
- "Art as a Medium of Civilization," American Journal of Education, 1876
- "The English Novel—Its Art Value," The Western Review, May 1876
- "Women as Teachers," American Journal of Education, November 1877
- "Arnold of Rugby," UM Public Lectures, 1878–79
- "Normal Departments in State Universities," Journal and Proceedings of NEA, 1880
- "The Education of the Public with Reference to Normal Schools and Their Work," Education, July 1881
- "Educational Intelligence," Journal of Education, 1894
- "Rousseau," 1895
- "Children’s Interests," The Northwestern Journal of Education, July 1896
- "What Children Imitate," The Northwestern Journal of Education, July 1896
- "What They Say," Journal of Education, 1898

=== Conference presentations ===
- "Monthly Examinations—Do They Have Their Perfect Work?," Illinois State Teachers Association, Decatur, August 1871
- "Relation of Art to Education," National Education Association Convention, Minneapolis, August 4, 1875
- "Women as Teachers," Minneapolis, August 1875
- "Attacks on Normal Schools," Louisville, Teachers’ National Association, August 1877
- "Evening Session: What Shall We Read?," Missouri Valley State Teachers Association, 1878
- "The Best Way of Arousing an Interest in Normal Work," 19th Annual Teachers’ Association Session, Columbia, Missouri, July 1880
- "Child Study and the Professional Training of Teachers," Nebraska Teachers’ Association 29th Meeting, December 27, 1894
- "Child Study Session," Educational Convention’s Program, Omaha, NE, June 28–30, 1898

=== Clubs ===
- St. Louis Hegelian Circle- translated the work of Rosenkranz and appeared in Journal of Speculative Philosophy. Bibb and her female Colleagues could not join the Society but could attend meetings and contribute articles and translations to the Journal of Speculative Philosophy. Other well known female philosophers attending meetings included Susan Blow, Anna Brackett and Maretta Kies.

== Places of residence ==
- Olive sw. cor. 12th, St. Louis, Missouri, 1871
- Park Hotel, St. Louis, Missouri, 1872
- 1313 Chestnut, St. Louis, Missouri, 1874–75
- 2839 Olive, St. Louis, Missouri, 1887–78
