= Bibb (given name) =

Bibb is a masculine given name. Notable people with the name include:

- Bibb Falk (1899–1989), American Major League Baseball player
- Bibb Graves (1873–1942), American politician
- Bibb Latané (born 1937), American social psychologist
