= USS Bibb (1853) =

Tugboat of the United States Navy

History

United States
- Name: USS Bibb
- Namesake: George M. Bibb
- Operator: Union Navy
- Laid down: February 24, 1853
- Launched: May 12, 1853
- Maiden voyage: 1853
- In service: 1864
- Out of service: 1864
- Fate: Returned to Coast Survey, retired and decommissioned 1879

General characteristics
- Type: revenue cutter
- Displacement: 409 long tons (416 t)
- Propulsion: Steam engine
- Complement: 35

USS Bibb was a United States Coast and Geodetic Survey vessel that performed survey work during the American Civil War. In 1864, when Washington, D.C. appeared under threat after Lt Gen. Jubal Early’s Confederate army crossed the Potomac River, Bibb was commandeered and armed by the Union Navy.

== Service history ==
Bibb was laid down for the Unnired States Coast Survey at the Charlestown Navy Yard on February 24, 1853, by a private contractor; launched on May 12, 1853; and got underway on August 11 for her first cruise. The engines for this vessel came from the USRC Bibb (1843), built for the Revenue Cutter Service at Pittsburgh in 1845, and transferred to the Coast Survey in 1847, following blockade duty during the war with Mexico. (Many sources, including the Coast Guard Historian's office, consider these the same vessel.) Bibb spent her career before the Southern rebellion in the Atlantic, on apparently unremarkable duty. On 28 June 1860, Bibb, under the command of Lt. Commander Alexander Murray, departed from New York City to Eclipse Harbour in northern Labrador to observe the total solar eclipse of 18 July 1860.

At the outbreak of the Civil War in April 1861, Bibb was transferred to the U.S. Revenue Cutter Service, but returned to the Coast Survey in November. Assigned to the Coast Survey contingent attached to the South Atlantic Blockading Squadron, Bibb steamed to Port Royal, South Carolina, and reported to the head of the former organization, Assistant Charles O. Boutelle, USCS, in January 1862, relieving Vixen and freeing that vessel to proceed north for repairs. Bibb served the Union cause in many ways: surveying and buoying harbors and channels along the Atlantic coast of the Confederacy between South Carolina and Florida; escorting transports; towing and piloting gunboats; carrying dispatches; and performing any other duties that were of assistance to the Union Army and Navy. Her labors won her the most generous praise of the leaders of both services.

Bibb spent the first half of 1864 in the Washington Navy Yard undergoing repairs. As this work was being completed, Confederate Lieutenant General Jubal A. Early crossed the Potomac River on a raid with a sizable force that endangered Washington, D.C. Seeking to help parry this threat to the Union capital, Commander Foxhall A. Parker took command of Bibb from the Coast Survey, armed her and ordered her to the Gunpowder River, where Southern troops had been seen. Commanded by Acting Ensign George E. McConnell, Bibb then ascended the Gunpowder but could not move closer than a point some five miles below Gunpowder Bridge; Bibb never exchanged fire with Confederate troops. After the crisis had passed, Parker returned Bibb to the Coast Survey, and she operated out of the Washington Navy Yard through the end of 1864.

Early in 1865, Bibb rejoined the South Atlantic Blockading Squadron, and worked along the Southern coast through the end of the war. A copy of a post-civil war Charleston Harbor chart (NOAA Archives) notes that on 16 March 1865, the Bibb struck a mine off of Fort Moultrie (Charleston), SC, which caused minor damage. Following the collapse of the Confederacy, Bibb resumed peacetime service with the Coast Survey and was retired and decommissioned in 1879.
