= USRC Bibb =

Ship of the U.S. Revenue Cutter Service

History

United States
- Name: USRC George M. Bibb, USS Bibb
- Namesake: George M. Bibb
- Owner: U.S. Revenue-Marine, 1845–47; U.S. Coast Survey, 1847–1852
- Laid down: 1843
- Launched: 1845
- Commissioned: 1845
- Decommissioned: 1852
- Maiden voyage: 1845
- In service: 1845–1852
- Out of service: 1852
- Refit: 1846
- Stricken: 1852 (est.)
- Homeport: New Orleans, Boston
- Fate: Engines salvaged for use in USS Bibb (1853)

General characteristics
- Type: Three-masted barquentine
- Displacement: 409 tons
- Length: 160 ft (49 m)
- Beam: 24 ft (7.3 m)
- Draft: 9.5 ft (2.9 m)
- Propulsion: (as built) Hunter's wheel; (in service) side wheel
- Complement: 58
- Armament: 1× long 18-pounder, 4× 32-pounders

The revenue cutter USRC George M. Bibb was an iron-hulled steamboat built at Pittsburgh in 1845, named after the then-Secretary of the Treasury George M. Bibb, which served on blockade duty during the Mexican–American War in 1846, and was transferred to the United States Coast Survey in 1847. Its engines were salvaged for a second Bibb that is sometimes considered to be a rebuild of the George M. Bibb.

== Design and construction ==
The shipbuilding industry in Pittsburgh and the rest of the United States had declined after the War of 1812. The advent of steam propulsion and iron hulls put Pittsburgh back in the business, however, and the federal government took a leading role in reviving Pittsburgh's role as a builder of ships for both fresh- and salt-water service.

On 9 September 1841, Congress authorized the construction of an iron-hulled steamboat for Great Lakes service. This led to the construction of USS Michigan (1843) by the firm of Stackhouse and Tomlinson, ordered May 19. 1842. It would be completely assembled, then broken down and hauled in sections to Erie along the Beaver Division of the Pennsylvania Canal. Michigan would be the first iron warship in the United States Navy.

Soon after construction on Michigan began, the United States Revenue-Marine ordered three iron steamers from the firm of Freeman, Knapp and Totten; these would be built at the Fort Pitt Foundry, across the Allegheny from Pittsburgh. The first of these, the screw-driven USRC Jefferson (1845) was constructed in a fashion similar to that used for Michigan; plates and frames were assembled at the Fort Pitt works, then transported by canal boat to Oswego on Lake Ontario. A second, USRC John Tyler (1843) was completed at Pittsburgh, then towed to New Orleans to be fitted out for service in the Gulf of Mexico.

The third of the Freeman, Knapp and Totten cutters was the George M. Bibb (briefly named Tyler), which was designed around the "Hunter wheel" (also, "Hunter's wheel") an experiment that featured paddle wheels mounted horizontally in the hull, rather than vertically on each side. This scheme was the brainchild of Lieutenant William W. Hunter, and it enjoyed a brief vogue in the mid-1840s before the superiority of Ericsson's screw was demonstrated. The paddle wheels were enclosed in chests, or cases, below the ship's waterline; only the paddles themselves extended from the vessel's sides. "Hunter's wheels" promised a great deal, including added protection from enemy shellfire, a lower center of gravity, and (it was hoped) increased efficiency and speed; the design was conceived at a time when hydrodynamics were little understood, and proved a complete failure.

Bibb was launched on March 8, 1845 without warning, and as spectators scrambled out of the way, two workmen were injured, one fatally. She took on her armament of eight guns at the docks in Pittsburgh and set off down the Ohio River for New Orleans. She made it to Cincinnati, but at that place sprang a leak that left her on the river bottom in a matter of hours.

The inquiry into Bibb's condition found that a packing around the shaft of one of the paddle wheels was to blame, rather than any fault of design. Nevertheless, the Treasury Department ordered that the cutter be rebuilt at Cincinnati with stronger frames, a more powerful engine and conventional side-mounted paddle wheels.

== Service with the Revenue Marine ==
By 1846, reconstruction was complete, and Bibb was on station at New Orleans under the command of Capt. Winslow Foster; she operated out of there until 18 May 1846, when she was ordered to blockade duty off the coast of Mexico, with 10 other cutters. With her sisters, Bibb spent her wartime service in support of the larger vessels in the American blockade, scouting coastal waters, carrying mail and supplies, and convoying or towing ships. After returning to New Orleans, she departed for Boston on 31 May 1847, arriving on 11 July.

== Coast Survey and the second Bibb ==
Upon arrival in Boston, Bibb was transferred to the United States Coast Survey. Although sources diverge on her future history, Bibb's engines were salvaged for a new revenue cutter, USS Bibb (1853), which was built at the Boston Navy Yard in 1853. Many authorities, including the Coast Guard Historian's office, consider this second Bibb to simply be a rebuild of the first.
