= USS Water Witch (1845) =

Tugboat of the United States Navy

History

United States
- Laid down: 1844
- Launched: 1845
- In service: 1845
- Out of service: 1845
- Fate: rebuilt as USS Water Witch (1847)

General characteristics
- Length: 100 ft (30 m)
- Beam: 21 ft (6.4 m)
- Propulsion: steam engine; side wheel-propelled
- Speed: 6.5 knots (12.0 km/h; 7.5 mph)

USS Water Witch was a steamer designed and constructed by the U.S. Navy with an experimental propulsion system that never quite worked, the Hunter wheel.

== Service history ==
The first Water Witch, a steamer built in 1844 and 1845 at the Washington Navy Yard, saw little active service. It was originally constructed to serve as a water supply vessel for the Norfolk, Virginia, station, but it was not used for that purpose because its draft was too deep for it to pass through the locks of the Dismal Swamp Canal to obtain fresh water. Consequently, it was fitted as a harbor vessel and tug.

However, its unique, but poorly conceived, Hunter Wheel propulsion system caused it to fail in that mission as well. In order to rid steamers of their vulnerable above-water paddle wheel housings and to increase their broadside weight, Lt. W. W. Hunter had devised and patented a system of placing the wheels inside the hull of the ship at a right angle to the keel making their rotations horizontal rather than vertical. The paddles extended their full length outside the hull for maximum contact with the water for propulsive purposes; and, inside the hull, they were encased by a cofferdam which kept the water from entering the ship proper. Unfortunately for Lt. Hunter, the wheels lost much of their power pushing water through the encased area inside the hull, forfeiting between 50 and 70 percent of their potential power.

That fact was recognized before the ship had served a year, so it was condemned and sent to Philadelphia, Pennsylvania, where it had arrived sometime before 21 November 1845. Its modifications there were so extensive that, in spite of the fact that it retained its name, the new creation is regarded as a second, distinct ship—USS Water Witch (1847).
