= The Water-Witch =

1830 novel by James Fenimore Cooper

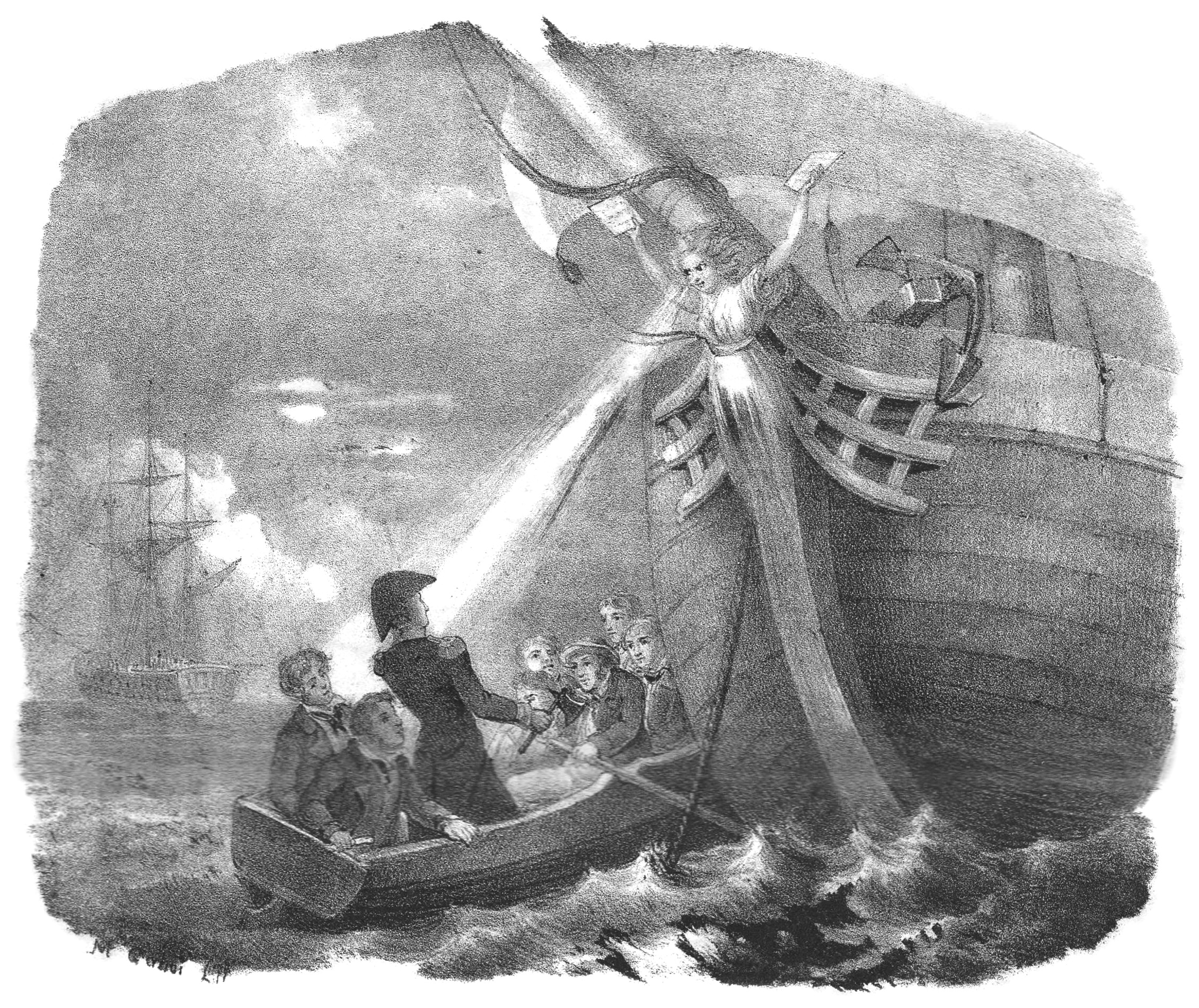
Illustration of an episode from The Water Witch, from a musical composition inspired by the story

The Water-Witch is an 1830 novel by James Fenimore Cooper. Set in 17th-century New York and the surrounding sea, the novel depicts the abduction of a woman, Alida de Barbérie, by the pirate captain of the brigantine Water-Witch, and the subsequent pursuit of that elusive ship by her suitor, Captain Ludlow.

Cooper wrote the novel while on an extended tour of Europe, during his stay in the villa Palazzu detta del Tasso near Naples. Cooper tried to print the novel while he was in Italy in 1829 but Papal censors forbade its publication there. He was eventually able to print the novel in Dresden before also sending copies to his publishers in the US and England. Critic Allan Axelrad describes the novel as heavily influenced by the Italian context of its writing, noting that it even compares the landscapes of New York with that of Italy.

The unincorporated community of Waterwitch, New Jersey is named after the novel.
