= Pernov-class torpedo boat =

Class of Imperial Russian and Soviet torpedo boats

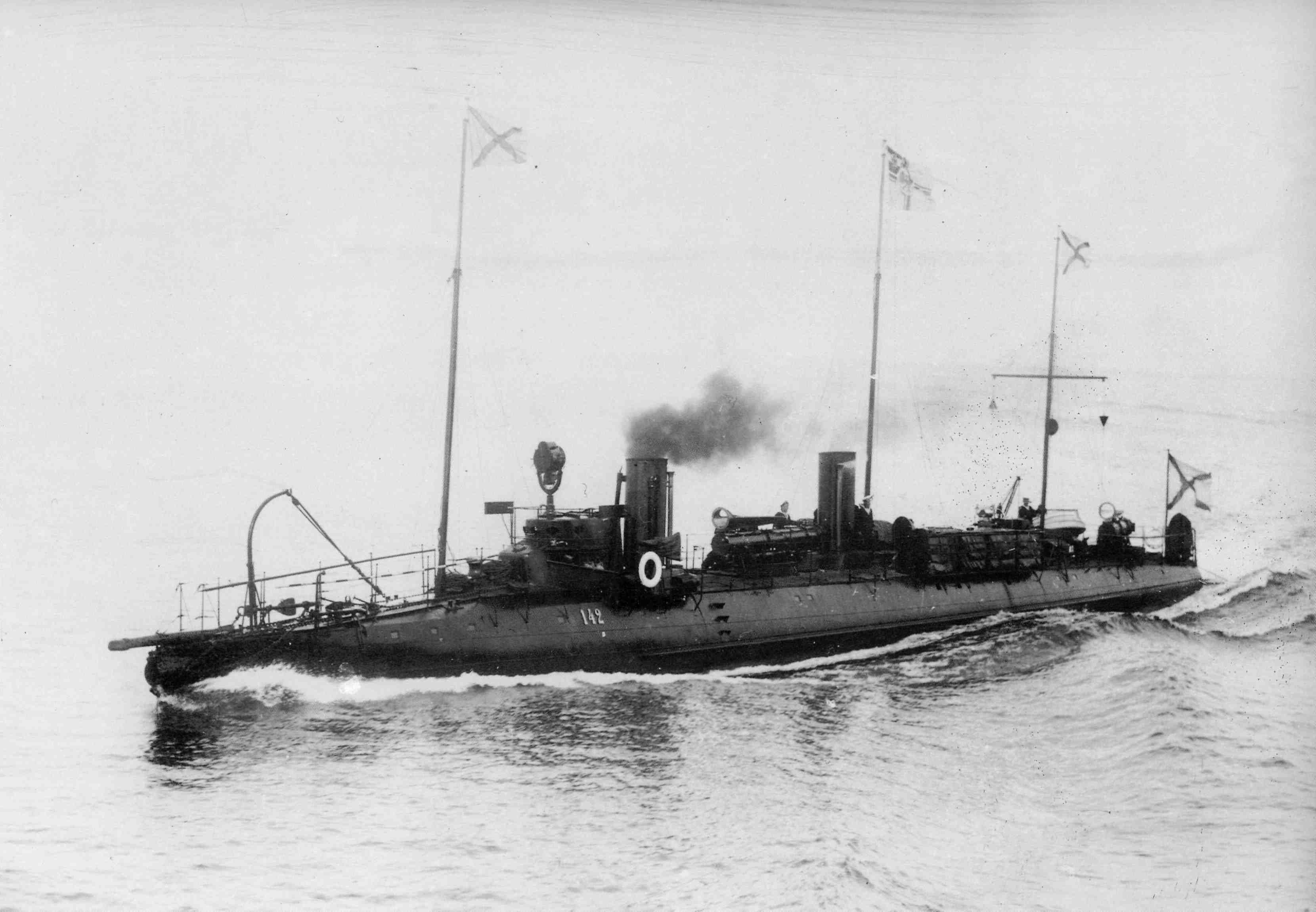
- No. 142 with the Russian and German naval ensigns on the occasion of Kaiser Wilhelm II visiting Tsar Nicholas II in Reval, 1902.

Class overview
- Operators: Imperial Russian Navy; Armed Forces of South Russia; Soviet Navy
- Built: 1891–1900
- In commission: 1892–1925
- Completed: 25
- Lost: 4
- Retired: 21

General characteristics
- Type: Torpedo boat
- Displacement: 120 tonnes (120 long tons)
- Length: 42 m (137 ft 10 in)
- Beam: 4.5 m (14 ft 9 in)
- Draught: 2.06 m (6 ft 9 in)
- Propulsion: 2 × three-drum boilers; 2 × compound steam engines; 2 × shafts
- Speed: 26 kn (48 km/h)
- Range: 550 nmi (1,020 km) at 10 kn (19 km/h)
- Complement: 24
- Armament: 3 × 381 mm (15.0 in) torpedo tubes; 2 × 37 mm (1.5 in) guns

The Pernov-class torpedo boat (Russian: Миноносец типа «Пернов») was a class of torpedo boats built for the Imperial Russian Navy between 1891 and 1900. A total of 25 boats were constructed, with four of them serving in the Siberian Flotilla, four in the Black Sea Fleet, and 17 in the Baltic Fleet. The majority of them were retired before the start of World War I. The ones that remained were used during that conflict and in the Russian Civil War. After the Bolshevik victory several of them were commissioned in the Soviet Navy for a few years, and the last ones that remained in service were struck from the navy list in 1925.

Overall, out of the 25 Pernov-class torpedo boats, four were sunk in combat or in accidents while the remainder were retired and scrapped. More boats of this class were built than of any other large torpedo boat class in the Imperial Russian Navy.

== Design and construction ==
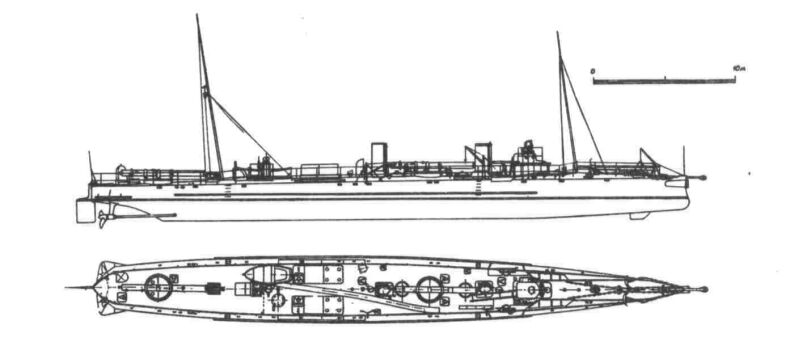
Schematic of the Pernov class

After the successful use of a torpedo during the Russo-Turkish War of 1877-78, the Imperial Russian Navy built over one hundred small torpedo boats with displacement of about 25 tons before 1880. Starting from that year they were succeeded by larger torpedo boat classes. The Pernov class was ordered by the Ministry of the Navy after a five-year naval armament program passed in 1890 authorized the construction of 50 torpedo boats with a displacement of 120 tons. At that time, Russia did not have any domestically built torpedo boats that the Ministry of the Navy considered promising, and the Anakria-class torpedo boat that was recently acquired from the German firm Schichau-Werke was seen as a disappointment, so on this occasion the Ministry examined designs from French and British companies. A contract was awarded to the French company Normand on 11 January 1891 to build one boat for testing purposes.

The resulting Pernov-class torpedo boat had a displacement of 120 tonnes (120 long tons), a length of 42 m (137 ft 10 in), beam of 4.5 m (14 ft 9 in), and draught of 2.06 m (6 ft 9 in). The boat received its power from two du Temple boilers, which were more reliable than the locomotive boilers used on earlier designs, and two vertical triple expansion steam engines, which provided 2,000 horsepower (1,500 kW) to the two propeller shafts. The torpedo boat carried 16 tons of coal. This gave it a top speed of 26 knots (48 km/h), and a range of 550 nautical miles (1,020 km) at a speed of 10 knots (19 km/h). As armament, the boat had three 381 mm (15.0 in) deck torpedo tubes and two 37 mm (1.46 in) guns. The total crew was 24, consisting of two officers and 22 sailors.

The first boat, Pernov, was built in France and arrived in Russia in November 1892. The Navy Ministry sent it to several different shipyards so that it could be examined and used as the basis to build more boats of the class domestically. After 1895 the lead ship was used as a training vessel. In 1893 the Crichton Yard in Turku started working on two more boats (Polangen and Pakerort). Starting from 1894 the Izhora Factory built boats 127 through 130 and the Nevsky Factory built 133 through 142. All of these went to the Baltic Fleet. The Nikolayev Admiralty Yard built 270 through 273 for the Black Sea Fleet, and the New Admiralty Shipyard built 208 through 211 for the Siberian Flotilla. The latter group were sent to Vladivostok to be assembled. With 25 total ships completed, the Pernov-class became the most numerous large torpedo boat class in the Russian Navy.

== Ships ==
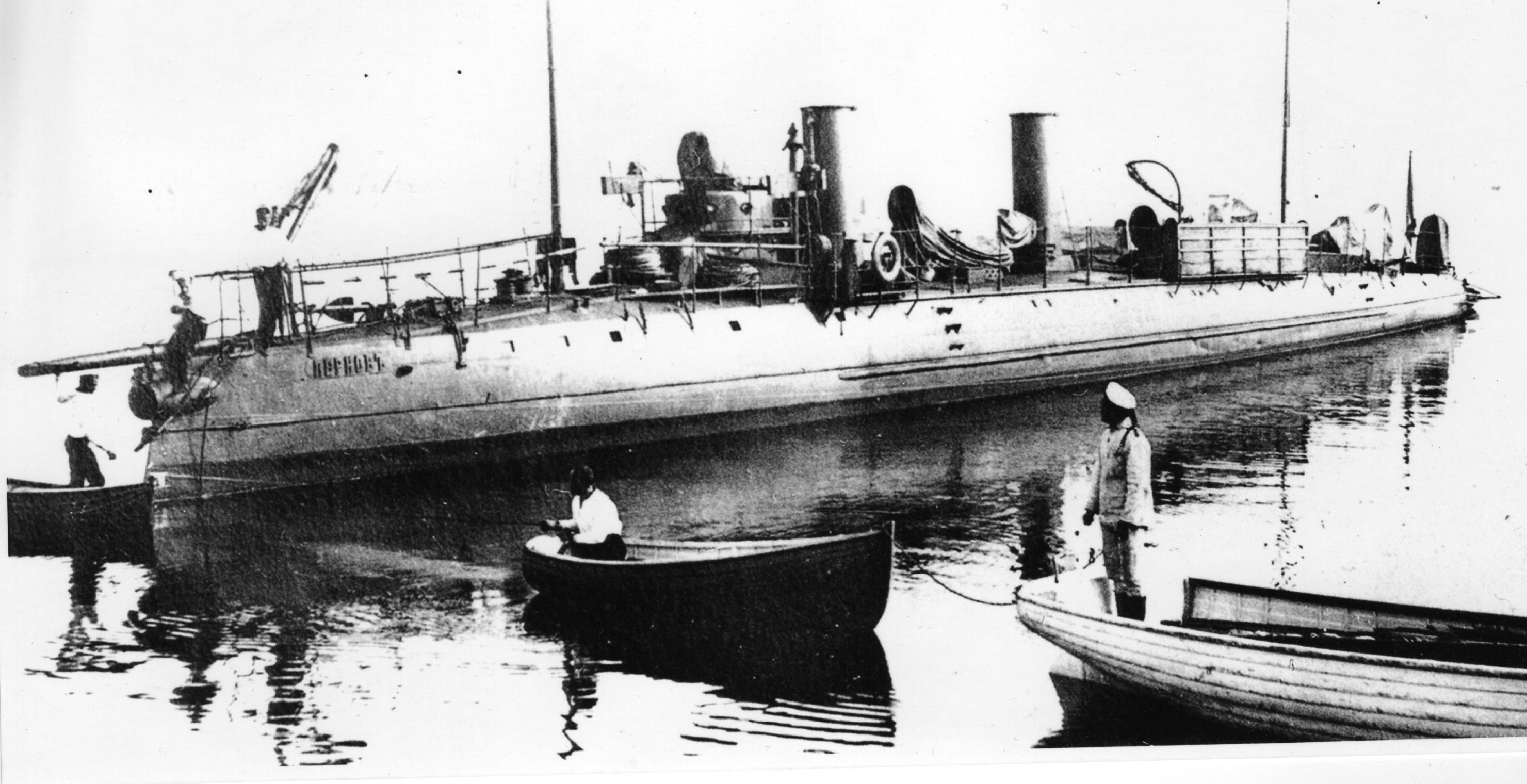
Pernov

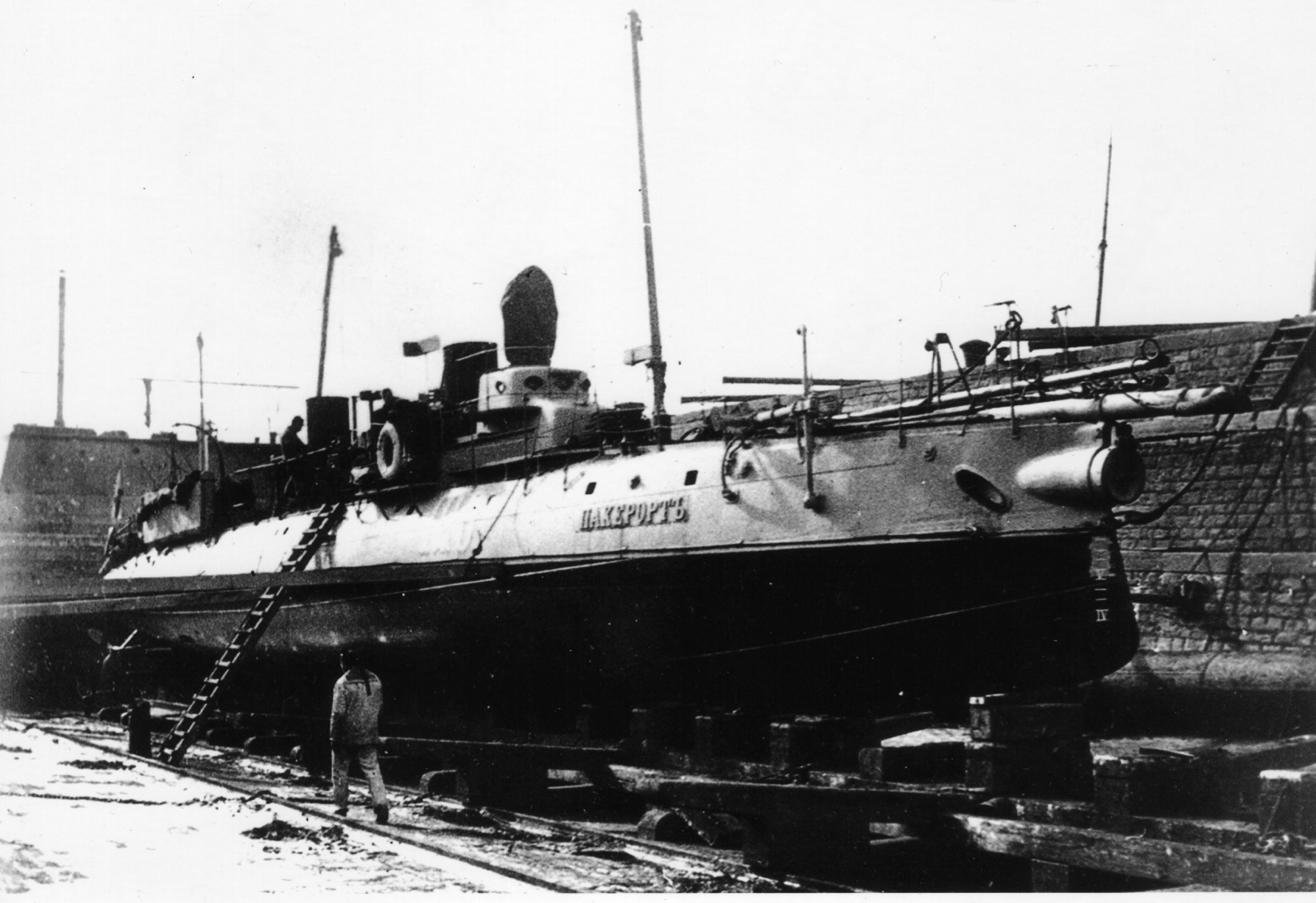
Pakerort in a dry dock

A total of 25 boats were built, all of which served in the Baltic Fleet except for four in the Siberian Flotilla (No. 208 – 211) and four in the Black Sea Fleet (No. 270 – 273). In 1895 most torpedo boats were given numbers, starting from 101 for the Baltic Fleet, from 251 in the Black Sea Fleet, and between 201 and 211 in the Siberian Flotilla.

Construction of Pernov-class torpedo boats
Initial name	Laid down	Launched	Completed	Redesignated	Fate
Pernov	January 1891	August 1892	November 1892	No. 103 (1895)	Sold for scrap in 1922
Polangen	July 1893	June 1895	November 1895	No. 119 (1895)	Sold for scrap in 1922
Pakerort	July 1893	July 1894	September 1895	No. 120 (1895)	Sold for scrap in 1922
No. 127	1894	May 1895	1898	–	Stricken on 8 February 1911
No. 128	January 1895	June 1896	1898	–	Sold for scrap in 1922
No. 129	June 1896	June 1897	October 1899	–	Sold for scrap in 1922
No. 130	June 1896	August 1897	1900	–	Stricken on 8 February 1911
No. 133	1894	October 1895	September 1897	–	Stricken on 8 February 1911
No. 134	1894	October 1895	September 1897	–	Stricken on 6 April 1914
No. 135	1895	June 1896	September 1897	–	Stricken on 8 February 1911
No. 136	1895	June 1896	October 1897	–	Sunk in the Gulf of Finland on 17 December 1912
No. 137	1896	May 1897	October 1897	–	Stricken on 8 February 1911
No. 138	1896	July 1897	October 1897	–	Stricken on 8 February 1911
No. 139	1896	July 1897	October 1897	–	Stricken on 8 February 1911
No. 140	1896	July 1897	November 1897	–	Stricken on 6 April 1914
No. 141	1896	August 1897	November 1897	–	Stricken on 8 February 1911
No. 142	1896	September 1897	November 1897	Zashchitnik (1921)	Sunk in Kronstadt in May 1923 before being raised and scrapped
No. 208	December 1896	October 1897	1899	–	Sunk by a mine during the Russo-Japanese War on 4 September 1904
No. 209	1896	1897	1899	–	Stricken on 8 February 1911
No. 210	1897	August 1898	1899	–	Stricken on 8 February 1911
No. 211	1897	1898	1900	–	Stricken on 13 January 1915
No. 270	March 1894	May 1895	1897	No. 6, No. 26, No. 276 (1915); No. 5 (1916)	Scrapped in 1924
No. 271	March 1894	July 1895	1897	No. 7, No. 77, No. 277 (1915); No. 6 (1916)	Scrapped in 1924
No. 272	August 1895	July 1896	1899	–	Sunk by collision with minesweeper Uspekh on 28 August 1914
No. 273	March 1894	September 1896	1899	–	Sold for scrap in December 1923

== Service history ==
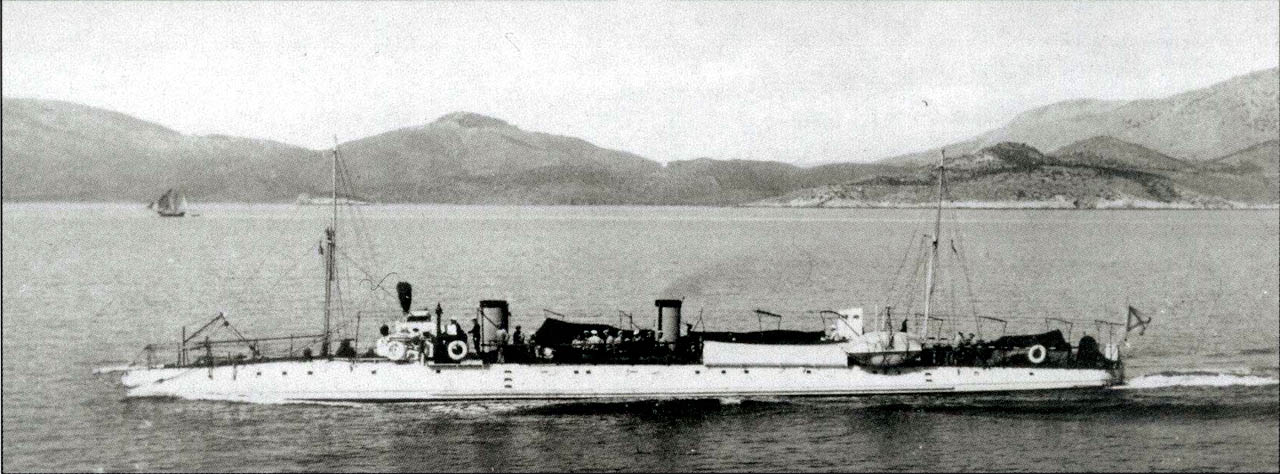
No. 208 in the Russian Far East. It was lost during the Russo-Japanese War.

The majority of the Baltic Fleet boats were removed from service before World War I broke out. One was also lost in an accident. On 17 December 1912, No. 136 hit a skerry and sank in the Gulf of Finland.

Among the ships that saw service in the war, the lead ship of the class, Pernov was used for crew training before becoming a dispatch vessel in October 1909. It received major repairs in 1910 and became part of the 4th Minesweeper Squadron in the Baltic Fleet. During the war Pernov was used for convoy protection, minesweeper work, and as a dispatch vessel. Its crew supported the February and October Revolutions, becoming part of the Bolshevik Red Fleet, and were sent to Finland to the assist the Finnish communists. The boat was captured by the White forces in Helsingfors, Finland, and was sent to the Soviet Union in 1922, which sold it for scrap. Pakerort, Polangen, and the other surviving Baltic Fleet boats had a similar history. No. 142 entered Soviet service and was renamed Zashchitnik on 12 June 1921, though it sank in Kronstadt on 1 May 1923 because of a leak. The boat was raised and scrapped later that month.

Two of the four Pacific Fleet boats were retired before World War I and one was retired during the war in January 1915. No. 208 was lost during the Russo-Japanese War on 4 September 1904 when it hit a mine near Skryplyov Island, causing the death of one crewmen and five injured.

During the war the Pernov-class torpedo boats in the Black Sea Fleet were use as dispatch ships and minesweepers. On 28 August 1914, No. 272 sank after colliding with the minesweeper Uspekh. During the Russian Civil War, the surviving boats were captured by Germans in May 1918, by Anglo-French troops in November 1918, and by the White Guards in June 1919. They were later captured by the Red Army and scrapped in 1923 or 1924, but they were not struck from the Soviet navy list until 21 November 1925.
