= Dago-class torpedo boat =

Class of Imperial Russian and Soviet torpedo boats

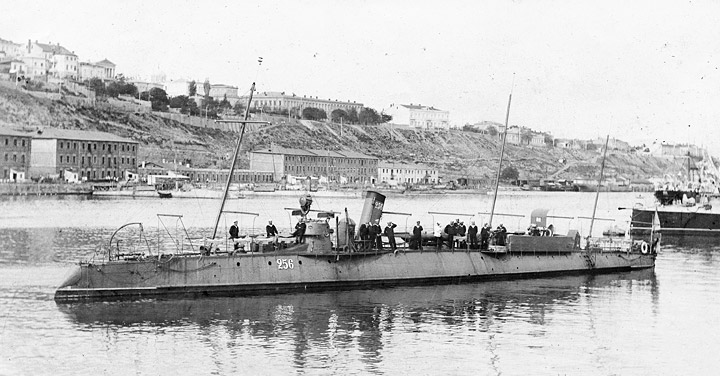
- Torpedo boat Kotka (No. 256) in 1909

Class overview
- Operators: Imperial Russian Navy; Armed Forces of South Russia; Soviet Navy; Soviet Border Troops
- Built: 1890–1892
- In commission: 1892–1925
- Completed: 4
- Retired: 4
- Scrapped: 4

General characteristics
- Type: Torpedo boat
- Displacement: 104 tonnes (102 long tons)
- Length: 46.8 m (153 ft 7 in)
- Beam: 3.94 m (12 ft 11 in)
- Draught: 2.34 m (7 ft 8 in)
- Propulsion: 1 × fire-tube boiler; 1 × compound steam engine; 1 × shaft
- Speed: 19 kn (35 km/h)
- Range: 450 nmi (830 km) at 12 kn (22 km/h)
- Complement: 20
- Armament: 2 × 380 mm (15 in) torpedo tubes; 2 × 37 mm (1.46 in) guns; 1 × 7.62 mm machine gun

The Dago-class torpedo boat (Russian: Миноносец типа «Даго») was a class of torpedo boats built for the Imperial Russian Navy in the early 1890s. A total of four ships were built, with three of them becoming part of the Baltic Fleet and one joining the Black Sea Fleet. At least two boats continued to serve through World War I, which included Dago in the Baltic Sea and Kotka in the Black Sea. During that conflict they were used for scouting, assisting seaplanes and submarines, and providing security at naval bases.

The two Dago-class torpedo boats survived World War I and the Russian Civil War before being captured by the Red Army. Dago joined the Bolshevik Red Fleet in 1918 and was used during the Russian Civil War, while Kotka changed sides at different times. They were both in the Red Fleet by the end of 1920. Kotka was decommissioned in 1922 and Dago was in 1925, and they were both given away to be scrapped.

== Design and construction ==
After the successful use of a torpedo during the Russo-Turkish War of 1877-78, the Imperial Russian Navy built over one hundred small torpedo boats with displacement of about 25 tons before 1880. Starting from that year they were succeeded by larger torpedo boat classes. In the late 1880s a new class of such boats was designed on the basis of the successful Revel class, which consisted of two boats that were launched in 1886. The beam and the draught of the new ship design was increased from the previous class to provide more stability, a larger conning tower was added, and one of the two aft torpedo tubes was removed. The resulting class, known as the Dago-class, was first designed in September 1889 by the Crichton Yard. Four boats of the class were planned, with two built at the Crichton Yard in Turku (Dago and Kotka) and two at the Izhora Factory in Saint Petersburg (Kronshlot and Seskar).

The Dago-class torpedo boat had a displacement of 104 tonnes (102 long tons), a length of 46.8 m (153 ft 7 in), beam of 3.94 m (12 ft 11 in), and draught of 2.34 m (7 ft 8 in). Its source of power was one locomotive boiler and a vertical triple expansion steam engine, which were designed to provide 1,000 horsepower (750 kW) to the propeller shaft. The torpedo boat carried 15 tons of coal. This gave it a top speed of 19 knots (35 km/h), and a range of 450 nautical miles (830 km) at a speed of 12 knots (22 km/h). As armament, the boat had two 380 mm (15 in) deck torpedo tubes (one bow and one aft), two 37 mm (1.46 in) guns, and one 7.62 mm machine gun. It had a total crew of 20, consisting of three officers and seventeen sailors.

All of the Dago-class boats were laid down in 1890 and launched by the summer of 1891. The completion of Kronshlot and Seskar at the Izhora Factory was delayed because of shortages of parts and the fact that they had a more complicated design of their boilers and engines. Despite the delays, the new torpedo boats were considered a success. Dago and Kotka were able to achieve a speed of 18 and 19 knots, respectively, while Seskar was used to test a new underwater torpedo tube. The boats were commissioned in 1892.

== Ships ==
The ships were first given names on 18 May 1891, but in April 1895 the large torpedo boats of the Baltic Fleet received numbers starting from 101 and those in the Black Sea Fleet received numbers from 251. Dago and Kotka had their designation changed several more times.

Construction of Dago-class torpedo boats
| Initial name | Laid down | Launched | Completed | Redesignated | Decommissioned |
|---|---|---|---|---|---|
| Dago | 1890 | 1891 | 1892 | No. 118 (1895), Periskop (1909), No. 15 (1921) | 1925 |
| Kotka | 1890 | 1891 | 1892 | No. 256 (1895), Letchik (1915), No. 4 (1916) | 1922 |
| Kronshlot | 1890 | 1891 | 1892 | No. 123 (1895) | 1909 |
| Seskar | 1890 | 1891 | 1892 | No. 124 (1895) | 1909 |

== Service history ==
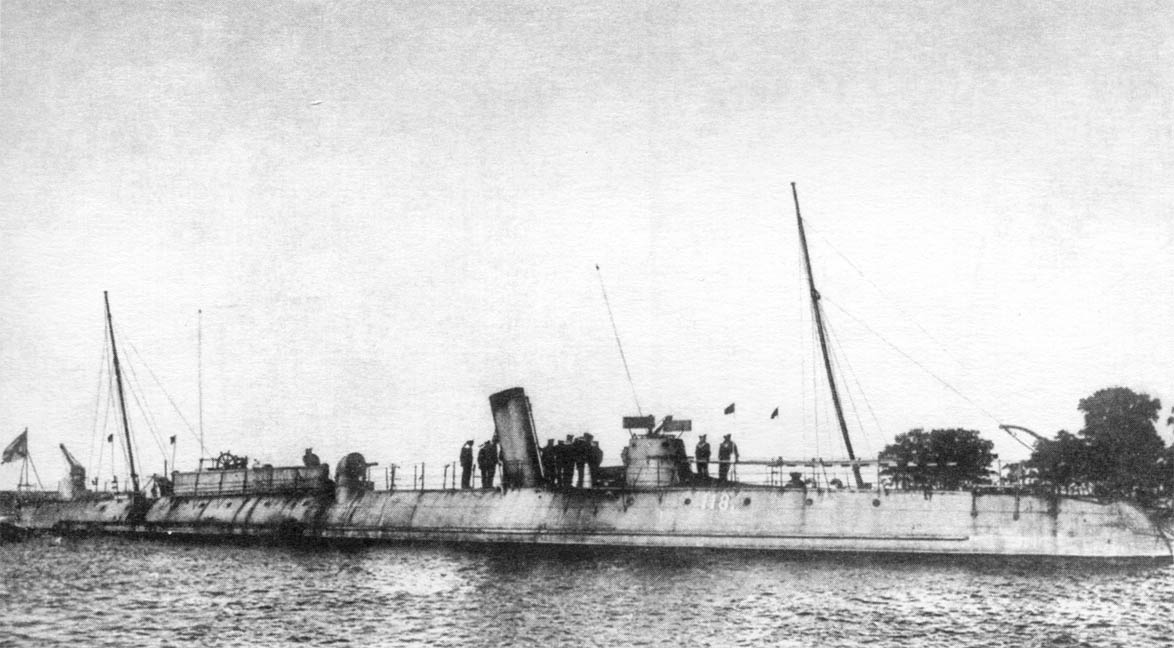
Dago in the 1890s

In August 1894 Kotka was assigned to the Pacific fleet, but it suffered from mechanical problems along the way to the Suez Canal and was left with the Mediterranean squadron in Greece. It was later sent to join the Black Sea Fleet in Crimea, arriving there in either March or April 1895. In 1908 the ship received extensive repairs, which included receiving a new boiler.

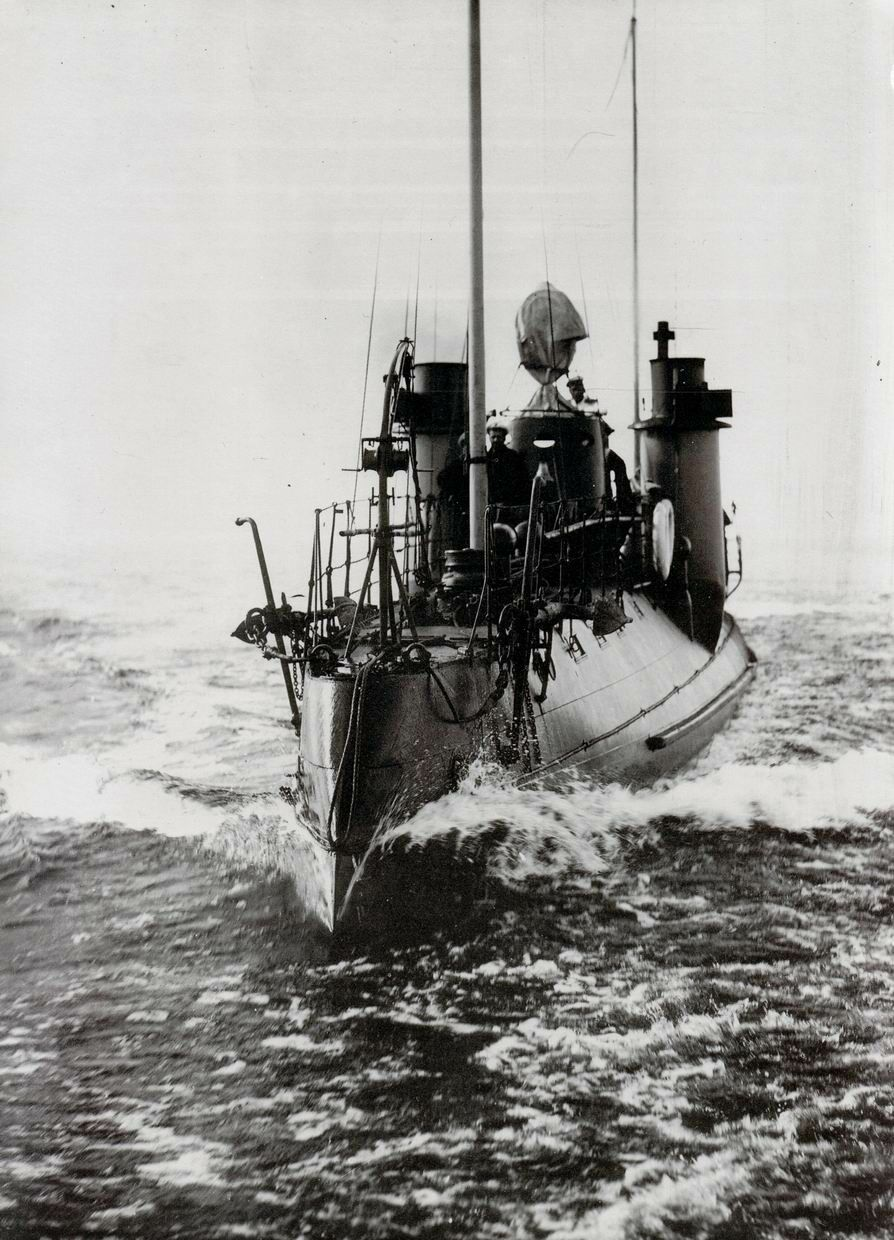
Seskar in the 1890s or 1900s

As of September 1914, Kotka was in the reserve torpedo boat squadron and it returned to active service as a dispatch ship for the naval aviation of the Black Sea Fleet. It had one torpedo tube, four guns, and one machine gun, and was part of the 1st dispatch ship squadron. During World War I the boat assisted seaplanes, and on 25 October 1914 it recovered a downed aircraft that had been fired at by the cruiser Breslau. For the rest of World War I Kotka took part in convoy escort duty, anti-submarine warfare, and protecting minesweepers, and operated at various times from the ports of Feodosia, Novorossiysk, Batumi, and Poti. After the Russian Revolution, Kotka was in Sevastopol and became part of the Bolshevik Red Black Sea Fleet in December 1917. During the Russian Civil War its ownership changed several times: in May 1918 it was captured by Germany, in November 1918 by the Anglo-French forces, and by the Armed Forces of South Russia in May 1919. It was left behind when Wrangel's fleet left Crimea in November 1920 and was acquired by the Red Army. After entering the Soviet Navy the torpedo boat was repaired in 1921 and was struck from the navy list on 1 March 1922, before being scrapped in 1924.

Several sources say that all three boats in the Baltic Fleet were removed from service around 1909–10. Another source says that Dago remained in service. In October 1909 it was put into storage, and in December of the same year it was reassigned to the Baltic Fleet submarine squadron as a dispatch ship. Dago underwent extensive repairs in 1910 and spent World War I providing assistance to submarines. By the end of 1918, the boat was transferred from Kronstadt to Nizhny Novgorod by river and became part of the Bolshevik Red Fleet. It became part of the Volga flotilla in December 1918, and then the Volga-Caspian Sea flotilla in February 1919, before being returned to the Baltic Fleet in 1920. From March to April 1922 Dago was part of the Finno-Ladoga flotilla of the OGPU coast guard. In July 1922 the boat was put into storage before being sent to be scrapped in August 1923, though it was not struck from the navy list until 21 November 1925.
