= Russian submarine Kaiman =

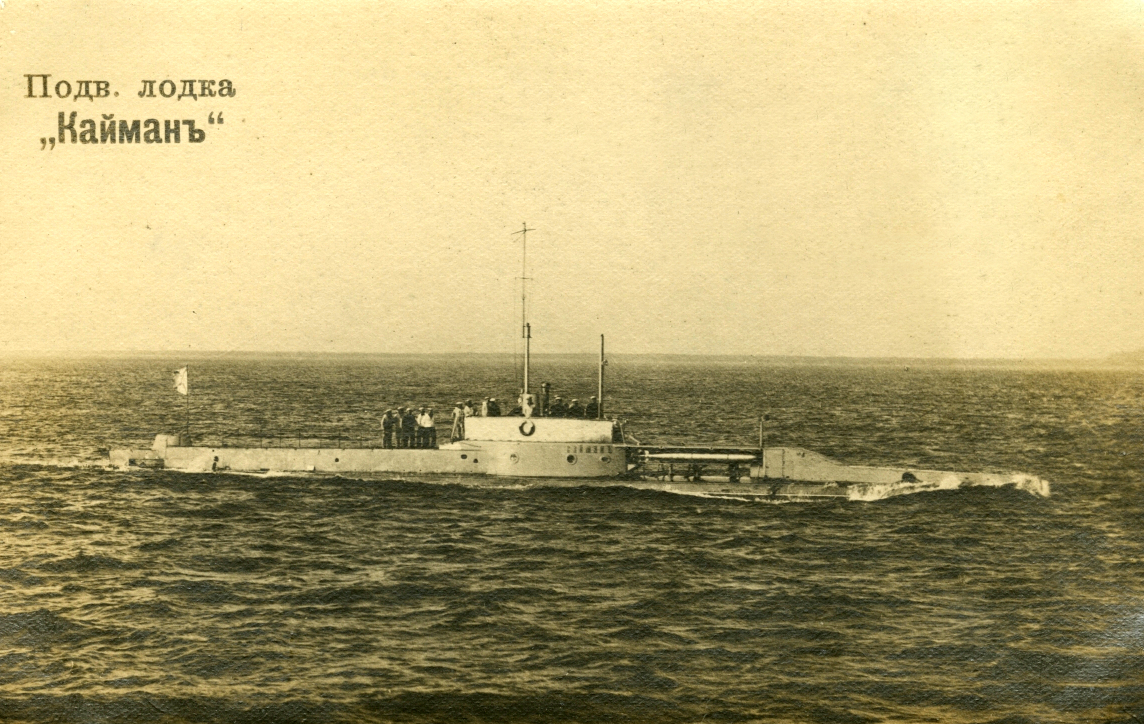

History

Russian Empire
- Name: Kaiman
- Builder: Crichton Yard, Saint Petersburg
- Laid down: 29 September (Note: O.S. 16 September) 1905
- Launched: 11 December (Note: O.S. 28 November) 1907
- Completed: 24 July (Note: O.S. 11 July) 1911
- Fate: Stricken on 15 November 1916. Captured by Germany in February 1918 and scrapped.

General characteristics
- Displacement: 409 long tons (416 t) (surfaced); 482 long tons (490 t) (submerged)
- Length: 132 ft 6 in (40.4 m)
- Beam: 14 ft 2 in (4.3 m)
- Draft: 16 ft 1 in (4.9 m)
- Installed power: 2 × gasoline engines (400 bhp (300 kW)); 2 × electric motors (200 bhp (150 kW))
- Propulsion: 2 × propeller shafts
- Speed: 8.4 knots (15.6 km/h; 9.7 mph) (surfaced); 7.5 knots (13.9 km/h; 8.6 mph) (submerged)
- Range: 1,050 nmi (1,940 km; 1,210 mi) at 8 knots (15 km/h; 9.2 mph) (surfaced); 40 nmi (74 km; 46 mi) at 5 knots (9.3 km/h; 5.8 mph) (submerged)
- Test depth: 90 feet (27 m)
- Complement: 34
- Armament: 4 × 18 in (457 mm) torpedo tubes (2 bow and 2 stern); 2 × external Drzewiecki drop collars; 1 × 47 mm (1.9 in) deck gun

The Russian submarine Kaiman (Russian: Кайман, lit. 'caiman') was the lead ship of the Kaiman class of submarines of the Imperial Russian Navy. It was designed by the American engineer Simon Lake and his Lake Torpedo Boat Company before being sold to Russia and built in Saint Petersburg at the Crichton Yard.

Kaiman was laid down in September 1905 and launched in December [O.S. November] 1907, though during its sea trials it was found to have many design problems. The boat had to undergo modifications and was finally completed in July 1911 before entering service with the Baltic Fleet. The submarine was considered obsolete when World War I broke out. It saw action in the first two years of the war, during which Kaiman completed 18 patrols. The submarine did not sink any ships, but it did capture and bring back one German freighter of 1,127 gross register tons (GRT) in October 1915. All of the Kaiman class submarines were struck from the navy list in November 1916 and were left docked at the port of Reval.

The crew of Kaiman and the other boats of its class were reassigned to the newer and more advanced Bars and AG class submarines that were entering service. Kaiman and the other three boats of its class spent the rest of the war docked at Reval, in the Estonian Governorate, until the city was captured by the Germans in February 1918, at which point all four were taken to Germany for scrapping.

== Design and construction ==
The Kaiman class was designed by Simon Lake, the head of the Lake Torpedo Boat Company, who previously sold the submarine Protector to the Imperial Russian Navy, which became the Osetr class. After receiving the first submarine, Russia ordered another five boats of the Osetr class on 10 May 1904, which were completed and launched in the following year. On 1 April 1905 Lake was given a contract by the Russian Navy to develop a new class based on the Osetr design but with more powerful weaponry and a longer range. At first the Russian naval command intended for this new class to become part of its Pacific Fleet in case of another war with Japan, expecting them to be capable of reaching the Japanese coast. But by the time they were completed and entered service in 1911, Russian foreign policy had shifted from focusing on Japan back to Europe, where the Bosnian crisis in 1908 set Russia against Germany and Austria-Hungary. Therefore, the Kaiman class boats became part of the Baltic Fleet as the 2nd Squadron of the Submarine Brigade. Emperor Nicholas II wanted to have submarines in the Baltic Sea that could help protect the Gulf of Finland and the maritime entrance to Saint Petersburg.

Kaiman was laid down in September 1905 and became the first boat in its class to be launched in December [O.S. November] 1907. But completing it and the other three Kaiman class submarines took longer than expected because they were found to have numerous problems. These included not being able to fully submerge, taking 10 minutes to dive, and having a slower maximum speed than what was promised, 10.5 knots (19.4 km/h; 12.1 mph) instead of 15 knots (28 km/h; 17 mph). The Lake Torpedo Boat Company could not fix these issues but wanted the Russian Navy to accept them anyway, which it did, but without paying the final portion of the submarines' total cost of three million rubles. Instead of paying the one million rubles that were still owed, the Ministry of the Navy used those funds to work on the design problems, and they authorized the submarine captains to make any changes to their boats that they deemed necessary. In 1910 all four Kaiman class submarines traveled from the Kronstadt naval base for testing in Finland.

Tests that were done by Russian engineers in Finland discovered that the boats were unstable because they were about 12 tons heavier than intended. The submarines were then sent to the shipyards in Reval to undergo changes, where a four-cylinder section from each of their two gasoline engines and the 47 mm (1.9 in) deck gun on the conning tower were removed, while new ballast pumps and two external Drzewiecki torpedo-launching collars were added. This increased the underwater speed to 7.5 knots (13.9 km/h; 8.6 mph) and reduced the diving time to three minutes. They still continued to have problems even after the improvements and were never seen as very seaworthy. The submarines also had a weak hull that included wood and caused leaks, and the removal of a section from each engine reduced their power from 600 bhp (450 kW) to 400 bhp (300 kW), which also reduced the top surface speed from 10.5 to 8.5 knots (15.7 km/h; 9.8 mph).

== Service history ==
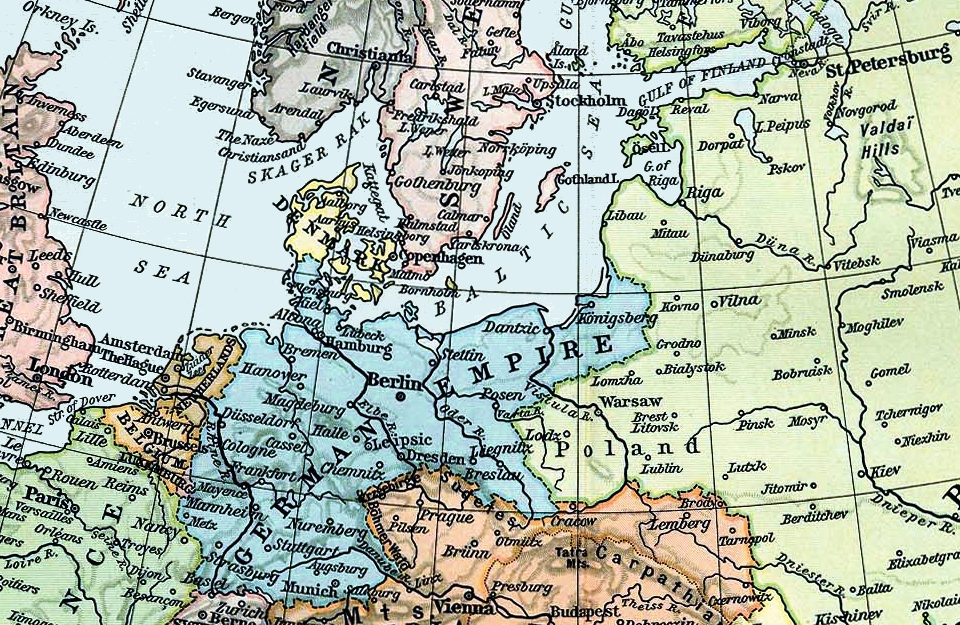
Map of the North and Baltic Seas in 1911

Kaiman was completed and entered service with the Imperial Baltic Fleet on 24 July [O.S. 11 July] 1911. Between then and the outbreak of World War I, the submarine carried out training dives and exercises. When the war started Kaiman went on its first patrol in July 1914 from Reval, and Lieutenant Ivan Messer was its commanding officer. In the fall of 1914, Kaiman and the rest of the 2nd Squadron of the Baltic Fleet Submarine Brigade were transferred from Reval in Estonia to the Finnish island of Utö. The island was part of the Turku archipelago in southwest Finland. During the first year of the war, the main role of submarines in the Baltic Sea was to defend the entrance to the Gulf of Finland (between Hanko and Dagö) by patrolling for German ships in predetermined positions and protecting Russian vessels laying minefields. Their operations were made more difficult by the cold climate causing much of the northern Baltic to freeze in the winter months, leading to a pause from about January to April.

The first time Kaiman encountered German warships was in the middle of December 1914, when a German squadron led by the cruiser Lübeck was sent to see if a Russian submarine base had been established in the Turku archipelago. Kaiman and two other boats, Alligator and Drakon, were sent out against them when the squadron was spotted, though the Germans left right away after confirming the presence of submarines. Although they were considered obsolete by then, Kaiman and the others were still able to fire four torpedoes. During the winter of 1914–15, its deck gun was also reinstalled.

=== 1915 ===
The next campaign season for submarines began in April 1915, and the unit Kaiman was part of was re-designated as the 3rd Squadron of the Baltic Fleet Submarine Division.

The most significant action involving Kaiman occurred when the submarines were used to stop German ships from entering the Gulf of Riga as the German Army advanced into Latvia in the summer of 1915. On 10 August, a German force of three cruisers (Seydlitz, Von der Tann, and Moltke) along with some destroyers arrived off Utö and started firing their guns at the island. Kaiman and Krokodil were sent to attack the German vessels, and their commander, Vice Admiral Franz von Hipper, chose to withdraw the cruisers after spotting the submarines, and sent German destroyers to attack them. Several days later on 25 August, the German submarine U-9 tried to enter the Utö base to destroy the Russian submarines there. But the Russians had advance warning of the U-boat's mission, and the only submarine left at the base, Kaiman, was leaving the docks to go on patrol when U-9 was approaching the channel that led to the base. The Russian captain, Ivan Messer, spotted the periscope of the U-boat near the channel entrance and prepared to attack, firing two torpedoes at it. U-9's captain also noticed the Russian submarine and began turning to go back out to the sea. The U-boat hit some rocks while in the channel but did not take any significant damage. Both torpedoes from Kaiman narrowly missed and U-9 was able to escape.

In the fall of 1915, Kaiman and the other submarines were sent to Mariehamn in the Aland Islands to undergo repairs. Around this time the Russian Naval General Staff decided to change their strategy and ordered their submarines to target the shipping of iron ore from Sweden to Germany. Kaiman and Drakon left the port of Mariehamn on 20 October 1915 to begin the new mission. While on patrol in the Sea of Åland, during which it also entered Sweden's territorial waters, Kaiman captured the 1,127-ton merchant ship Stahleck on 29 October. Submarine operations ended for the year not long after that as the winter months began. During that time, Lieutenant Messer was reassigned from Kaiman to the newer Bars-class submarine Volk. Despite having gone on several patrols during the 1915 sailing season, by the end of it Kaiman had not sunk any ships and neither did any other Russian submarine in the Baltic Sea.

=== 1916–18 ===
When the 1916 sailing season started the Russian Navy was in the process of replacing the Kaiman class with the newer Bars class submarines. In March 1916 Kaiman was reassigned to the 5th Squadron of the Baltic Sea Submarine Division. That year's naval campaign was uneventful for Kaiman, which did not sink any ships at this time either, but it did carry out the last known attack by any submarine of its class on 24 August 1916, when one of its torpedoes narrowly missed a German merchant ship. The government of Sweden protested this because the attack took place in Swedish waters. In total since 1914, Kaiman completed 18 war patrols up to this point.

When the 1916 campaign ended in November, the Kaiman class boats were all struck from the navy list on the 15th of that month. That was because several new Bars and AG class submarines had entered service with the Baltic Fleet Submarine Division. Kaiman and its sister ships remained docked at the port of Reval for over a year, where they were also partially dismantled, while their crews were sent to serve on the new submarines. Kaiman was still in Reval when the German Army took control of the city in February 1918, and all four boats were taken to Germany to be turned into scrap metal.

=== Summary ===
Ships taken by Kaiman
Date	Ship	Flag	Tonnage	Notes
29 October 1915	Stahleck	Germany	1,127 GRT	Captured
Total:			1,127 GRT	
