= Silatch =

Imperial Russian and Soviet icebreaker

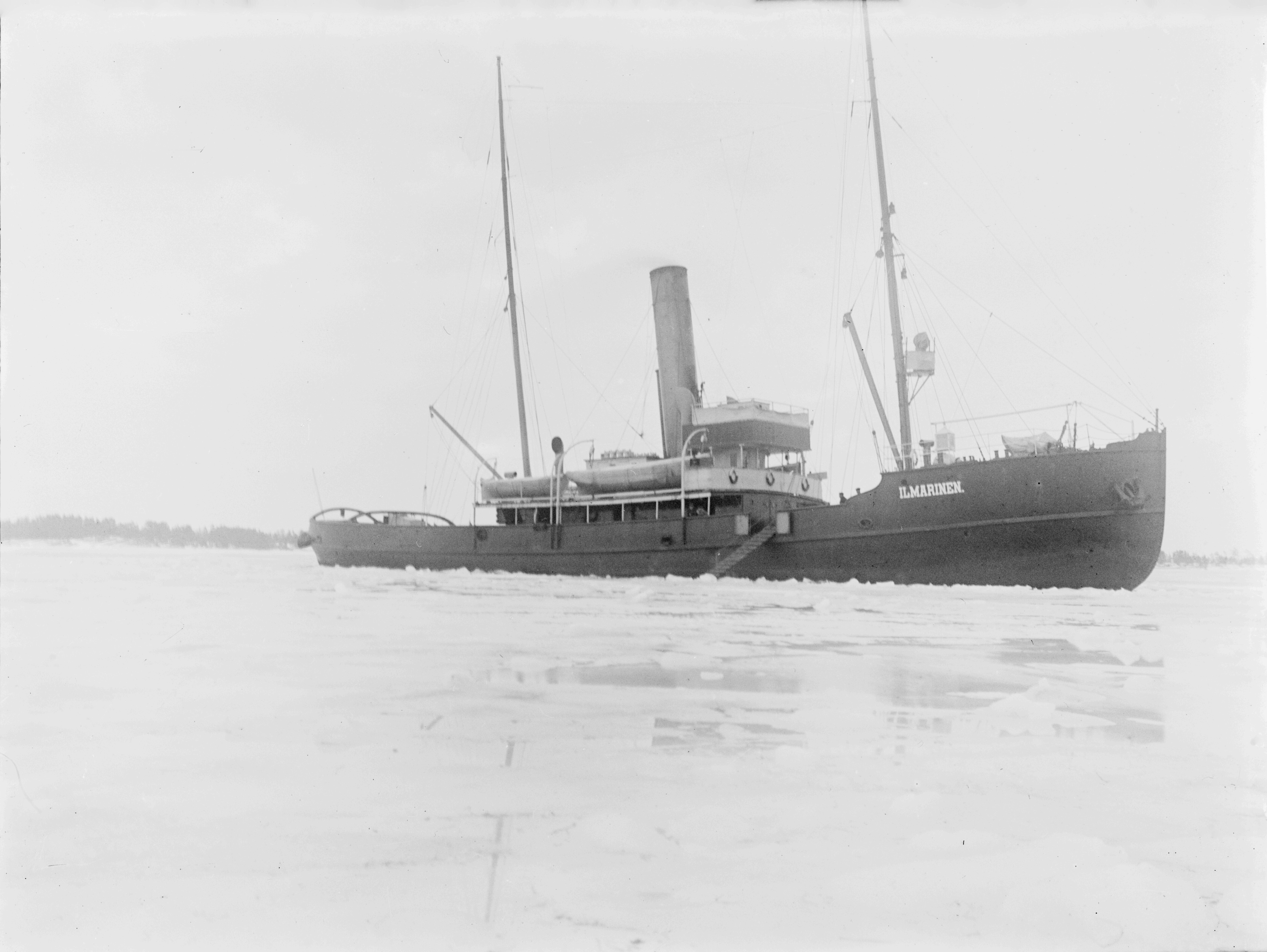
- Silatch briefly as Finnish Ilmarinen

History

Russia
- Name: Silatch
- Namesake: Russian for "strong man"
- Builder: W. Crichton, Saint Petersburg, Russia
- Completed: 1910
- In service: 1910–1917
- Fate: Captured by the Bolsheviks in 1917

Soviet Russia
- Name: Silatch
- In service: 1917–1918
- Fate: Captured by Finland in 1918

Finland
- Name: Ilmarinen
- Namesake: Ilmarinen
- Owner: Finnish Board of Navigation
- Port of registry: Helsinki, Finland
- In service: 1918–1922
- Fate: Handed over to the Soviet Union in 1922

Soviet Union
- Name: Silatch
- Owner: Sovtorgflot
- Port of registry: Leningrad, Soviet Union
- In service: 1922–late 1950s

General characteristics
- Type: Icebreaker
- Tonnage: 541 GRT
- Displacement: 910 tons
- Length: 47.0 m (154.2 ft)
- Beam: 10.1 m (33 ft)
- Draft: 5.3 m (17 ft)
- Engine: Triple-expansion steam engine, 1,000 ihp (750 kW)
- Propulsion: Four-bladed propeller
- Crew: 32–33

Silatch was a small Imperial Russian and later Soviet steam-powered icebreaker. She was captured by Finland in the aftermath of the Finnish Civil War in 1918 and renamed Ilmarinen until returned to the Soviet Union in 1922. She was decommissioned in the 1950s.

== History ==
Silatch (Russian for "strong man") was built in 1910 by W. Crichton shipyard in Saint Petersburg, Russia. She was taken over by Bolsheviks in 1917 during the October Revolution, but retained her original name.

On 4 May 1918, in the aftermath of the Finnish Civil War, Silatch arrived secretly in Kotka, Finland, to evacuate remaining members of the Finnish Red Guard. However, she was confiscated by the Finns and joined the Finnish icebreaker fleet as Ilmarinen, after the legendary hero from Kalevala. In December 1919 she was sent to Koivisto to assist three Finnish torpedo boats, C1, C2 and C3 that had been surrounded by ice some 15 centimetres (5.9 in) thick. The 150-ton torpedo boats had participated in the British campaign in the Baltic, and Admiral Walter Cowan had demanded that the Finnish squadron patrolling the area had to stay until the British forces had withdrawn. Despite the efforts of Ilmarinen, the weak-hulled torpedo boats were crushed by the ice, and the newly founded Finnish Navy lost one fifth of its ships. After the winter of 1919 Ilmarinen was laid up until she was returned to the Soviet Union according to the Treaty of Tartu. In turn the Soviets gave back the Finnish icebreaker Avance. The name Ilmarinen was later given to a Finnish coastal defence ship launched in 1931.

After rejoining the Soviet Union, the ship was given back her original name, Silatch, and was again stationed in her former home port, Petrograd, which was renamed Leningrad in 1924. She worked in the Kronstadt port until 1941. At the beginning of the Soviet-German war, the ship was docked in Liepāja port under maintenance. She was exploded by her crew on 27 June 1941. The Germans had repaired and commissioned her as Nordlicht ("northern lights"), but the ship was sunken by a Soviet air strike. After the war, she was salvaged by the Soviets and repaired. The icebreaker Silatch worked for the Baltic Sea Shipping Company and was decommissioned in the end of 1950s.

== Technical details ==
The 910-ton Silatch was 47.0 metres (154.2 ft) long, 10.1 metres (33 ft) wide and had a draft of 5.3 metres (17 ft). She was powered by a single triple-expansion steam engine producing 1,000 indicated horsepower (750 kW) and propelled by a four-bladed propeller in the stern.

In Finnish service she had a crew of 32–33, of which 8 or 9 were officers. In terms of size and design she was comparable to the Finnish icebreakers Murtaja and Apu.
