= Kaiman-class submarine =

Imperial Russian Navy submarines, 1911–1918

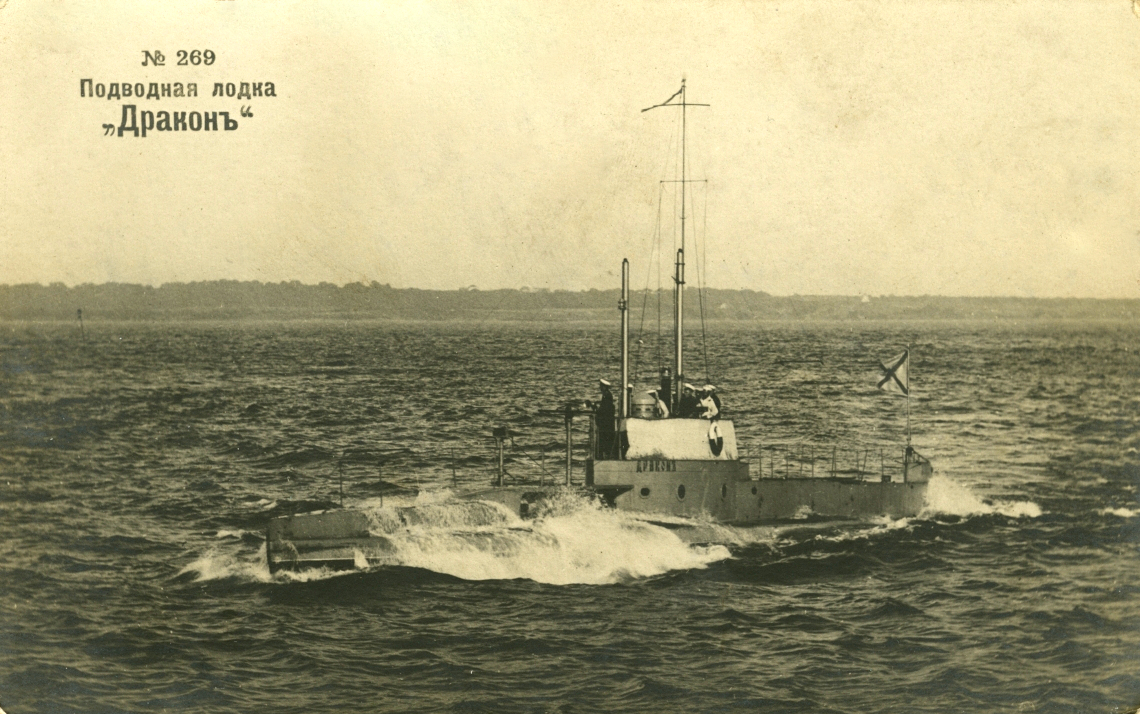
- Drakon

Class overview
- Name: Kaiman class
- Builders: W:m Crichton & C:o Okhta, Saint Petersburg
- Operators: Imperial Russian Navy
- Built: 1906–1911
- In commission: 1911–1918
- Planned: 4
- Completed: 4
- Lost: 4

General characteristics (after the rebuild)
- Displacement: 409 long tons (416 t) (surfaced); 482 long tons (490 t) (submerged)
- Length: 134 ft 6 in (41.0 m)
- Beam: 12 ft 2 in (3.7 m)
- Draft: 16 ft 1 in (4.9 m)
- Installed power: 2 × gasoline engines (400 bhp (300 kW)); 2 × electric motors (200 bhp (150 kW))
- Propulsion: 2 × propeller shafts
- Speed: 8.4 knots (15.6 km/h; 9.7 mph) (surfaced); 7.5 knots (13.9 km/h; 8.6 mph) (submerged)
- Range: 1,050 nmi (1,940 km; 1,210 mi) at 8 knots (15 km/h; 9.2 mph) (surfaced); 40 nmi (74 km; 46 mi) at 5 knots (9.3 km/h; 5.8 mph) (submerged)
- Test depth: 90 feet (27 m)
- Complement: 34
- Armament: 2 × bow and stern 17.7 in (450 mm) torpedo tubes; 2 × external Drzewiecki drop collars

The Kaiman class (Note: It was also sometimes called the Alligator class or the Lake type.) consisted of four submarines begun for the Imperial Russian Navy during the Russo-Japanese War of 1904–1905. Construction did not commence until after the war was ended and was very protracted with the boats not being completed until 1911 due to numerous defects that resulted in a legal battle between Lake and the Russian Government. The Russians impounded them in 1910 and they had to be rebuilt to remedy some of the defects. Assigned to the Baltic Fleet, they were very active during the early part of the First World War, albeit with little success. They were decommissioned in late 1916 to release their crews for newly constructed submarines.

== Design and description ==
The Kaiman class was designed by the American submarine pioneer Simon Lake as enlarged versions of his Osetr class with more torpedo tubes and a longer range that would enable to cruise of the Japanese coast. The boats displaced 409 long tons (416 t) surfaced and 482 long tons (490 t) submerged. They had an overall length of 134 ft 6 in (41.0 m), a beam of 12 ft 2 in (3.7 m), and a draft of 16 ft 1 in (4.9 m). The Kaiman's had a diving depth of 90 ft (27 m). Their crew numbered 34 officers and crewmen.

For surface running, the Kaimans were powered by a pair of gasoline engines, each driving one propeller shaft. When they were rebuilt in 1910–1911, each engine had a four-cylinder section of removed which reduced their power from the1,200 brake horsepower (1,217 PS; 895 kW) demonstrated during their sea trials to 800 bhp (810 PS; 600 kW). This consequently reduced their speed from the intended 10.5 knots (19.4 km/h; 12.1 mph) to 8.5 knots (15.7 km/h; 9.8 mph). When submerged each shaft was driven by a 200-brake-horsepower (203 PS; 149 kW) electric motor for 7.5 knots (13.9 km/h; 8.6 mph). The boats had a surface endurance of 1,050 nautical miles (1,940 km; 1,210 mi) at 8 knots (15 km/h; 9.2 mph) and 40 nmi (74 km; 46 mi) at 5 knots (9.3 km/h; 5.8 mph) submerged.

The main armament of the Kaiman-class boats was designed to consist of four 17.7-inch (450 mm) torpedo tubes; one pair each in the bow and stern. During the rebuild two external rotating Drzewiecki drop collars were added, one on each broadside. The boats were initially designed to accommodate a 47 mm (2 in) deck gun, but this was removed during the rebuild.

== Ships ==
Ship	Laid Down	Launched	Completed	Fate
Kaiman	1905	November 1907	1911	Scuttled, 25 February 1918 at Reval, Estonia
Alligator	1905	1908	1911	Scuttled, 25 February 1918 at Reval, Estonia
Krokodil	1905	1908	1911	Scuttled, 25 February 1918 at Reval, Estonia
Drakon	1905	27 June 1908	1911	Scuttled, 25 February 1918 at Reval, Estonia

== Careers ==
A contract for the four submarines was placed on 1 April 1905 and they were built by the Crichton Yard in Saint Petersburg under Lake's supervision. Sea trials revealed that they had difficulties submerging on an even keel, took at least 10 minutes to submerge and could only reach a speed of 10.5 knots rather than the contractual 15 knots (28 km/h; 17 mph). Lake could not correct these problems and insisted that the Russians accept the boats as they were. The Russians had already paid three-quarters of the price and refused to accept them and pay the final quarter. Lake then threatened to sell them to the Royal Swedish Navy, but the Russians decided to impound the submarines and use the unpaid monies to rebuild the Kaimans. Russian engineers had determined that many of the instability problems arose because the boats were 12 long tons (12 t) overweight.

They were assigned to the Baltic Fleet upon commissioning and formed the Second Division of the fleet's Submarine Brigade. During 1914–1915, the boats made numerous attacks on German warships, but bad tactics and torpedo malfunctions prevented them from scoring any hits. In late 1915, the Naval Staff decided to include German merchant shipping as targets instead of just naval ships. This allowed the Kaimans to capture two small German cargo ships in October and another in August 1916. Shortly afterward, all four boats were decommissioned at Reval (now Tallinn), Estonia, on 15 November so their crews could man the newly commissioned submarines joining the fleet. They were scuttled in Reval on 25 February 1918 to prevent their capture by the advancing German forces.

== Bibliography ==
- Apalkov, Yu. V. (1996). Боевые корабли русского флота: 8.1914-10.1917г [Combat Ships of the Russian Fleet: 8.1914-10.1917] (in Russian). ИНТЕК. ISBN 5-7559-0018-3.
- Budzbon, Przemysław (1985). "Russia". In Gray, Randal (ed.). Conway's All the World's Fighting Ships 1906–1921. Naval Institute Press. ISBN 0-85177-245-5.
- Harris, Mark (2025). The First World War in the Baltic Sea. Vol. 1: Essen's Triumph, 1914 to February 1915. Helion. ISBN 978-1-804519-10-3.
- Polmar, Norman & Noot, Jurrien (1991). Submarines of the Russian and Soviet Navies, 1718–1990. Naval Institute Press. ISBN 0-87021-570-1.
- Stevenson, Gene C. (1990). "Russian 'Lake' Type Submarines and the Baltic War 1914–1916". In Gardiner, Robert (ed.). Warship 1990. Naval Institute Press. ISBN 1-55750-903-4.
- Watts, Anthony J. (1990). The Imperial Russian Navy. Arms and Armour. ISBN 0-85368-912-1.
