= Ivan Messer =

Officer of the Imperial Russian Navy (1884–1952)

- Born: 7 September 1884; Saint Petersburg, Russian Empire
- Died: 16 December 1952 (aged 68); Cleveland, Ohio, US
- Military career
- Allegiance: Russian Empire
- Branch: Imperial Russian Navy
- Rank: Captain 1st rank
- Unit: Baltic Fleet Submarine Brigade
- Commands: Beluga; Kaiman; Volk
- Conflicts: World War I; Baltic Sea campaign

Ivan Vladimirovich Messer (Russian: Иван Владимирович Мессер; 7 September 1884 – 16 December 1952) was an officer of the Imperial Russian Navy.

Messer was the most successful Russian submarine commander of World War I, capturing one German merchant ship while commanding the submarine Kaiman and sinking four others while commanding the Volk, for a total of 10,756 gross register tons (GRT). He was the highest achieving commander in tonnage, though Mikhail Kititsyn sank a larger number of ships.

Ivan Messer was born in Saint Petersburg on 7 September 1884. He graduated from the Naval Cadet Corps in 1903, and from the submarine training unit in 1910, before commanding the submarine Beluga. When World War I broke out, Messer was the commanding officer of the submarine Kaiman. In late 1915 he was reassigned to be the captain of the submarine Volk, with which he carried out nine war patrols and sank four merchant ships.

After the Russian Revolution, Messer supported the White movement and went to Arkhangelsk, where he was in charge of lighthouses on the White Sea coast. Following the Russian Civil War he emigrated to Finland, Serbia, and finally to the United States, where he died on 16 December 1952 in Cleveland, Ohio.

== Summary of career ==
Messer was credited with sinking or capturing five merchant ships for a total of 10,756 gross register tons (GRT).

Date	Submarine	Name of Ship	Nationality	Tonnage	Fate
29 October 1915	Kaiman	Stahleck	Germany	1,127 GRT	Captured in the Sea of Åland
17 May 1916	Volk	Hera	Germany	2,800 GRT	Sunk in the Bay of Norrköping
17 May 1916	Volk	Kolga	Germany	2,086 GRT	Sunk in the Bay of Norrköping
17 May 1916	Volk	Bianca	Germany	1,054 GRT	Sunk in the Bay of Norrköping
8 July 1916	Volk	Dorita	Germany	3,689 GRT	Sunk off Örnsköldsvik
