= Petrozavod =

Petrozavod (Russian: Петрозавод) was a company based in Saint Petersburg, Russia. One of the oldest shipbuilding establishments in Russia, it was converted to manufacture machine tools and components for use in other shipyards in the 1970s. The company was declared bankrupt in 2000; the cancelled Okhta Center project was to be built on its former site.

== History ==
It was founded at the junction of the Okhta and Neva rivers in 1721 as a roofing shingle works, a settlement for serfs working at the Main Admiralty Yard, and a small shipyard. It was enlarged in 1806 and, as the Okhta Admiralty, built sailing frigates and ships of the line. It was leased to private shipbuilders between 1872 and 1913 for the construction of smaller ships. From 1897 until 1913 the yard was operated by Finnish shipbuilder W:m Crichton & C:o as W:m Crichton & C:o Okhta shipyard. In 1931 the yard became a specialist in the construction of tugs.

During the 1950s and 1960s, it built 63 oceangoing tugs of the "Goliat" class (known in the West as the Okhtenskiy class) and many harbor tugs of the "Peredovik" (Sidehole) and "Prometey" (Saka) classes. After the yard was rebuilt in the late 1970s it has manufactured sophisticated shipbuilding production line equipment.

Early projects included mechanization of the assembly and welding production lines at the Vyborg Shipbuilding Plant and construction of a unit for assembly and welding of large hull sections at the Zhdanov Shipbuilding Plant in Leningrad.
