= Okhta shipyard =

The Okhta shipyard was a Russian shipyard based in Saint Petersburg. It was located in the Malaya Okhta district Russian Empire. at the confluence of the Okhta and Neva rivers.

Shipbuilding history in the area goes back to 1721, when Okhta was settled and the residents processed wood for shipbuilding. In 1807 the land was purchased by the Russian navy and became the site of the Okhta Admiralty yard. The first vessel was built in 1811, under supervision of a nearby institute. Since the beginning the main customer was the Russian Admiralty. During the years 1811–1864 the Okhta yard built more than 160 vessels, including nine ships of the line, and was the most important yard of the Imperial Russian Navy during this period. By the 1860s, when steel hulls replaced wood, the yard became outdated.

The yard was underused for the following 30 years, until it was rented to the Finnish shipbuilder W:m Crichton & C:o in 1896. Crichton built a number of torpedo boats and other vessels predominantly for the Imperial Russian Navy. The work was poorly organised and the company made unprofitable deals. The losses caused by the Okhta shipyard caused W:m Crichton & C:o become bankrupt in 1913.

The area went back to the state and marine industry was continued by Petrozavod company.

== Background ==
The yard was situated in an area where small river Okhta flows into river Neva. During the Swedish era there was a fortress called Nyenskans, "Neva fortlet". Since the establishment of Saint Petersburg, the area was serving shipbuilding; in 1712–1713 it was used for storing and drying of logs. The first large sawmills were built in 1717; they delivered wood also to the Russian Admiralty and Particular Shipyard. In 1721 the area was settled under decree of Peter the Great and carpenters were transferred from other Russian governorates. They worked for Particular Shipyard and other important shipyards and by time they fell into serfdom, until they were set free in 1803.

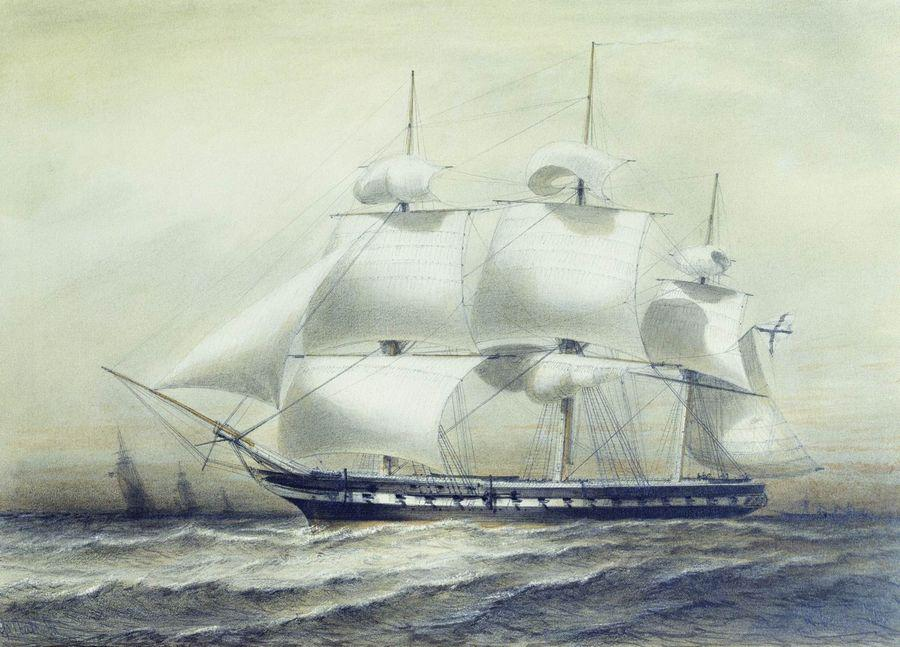
Frigate Pallada constructed at Okhta yard.

In 1806 the Admiralty bought the area opposite the Smolny monastery an area, where the convent had a school for young ladies. The purpose was to build a panoptical institute to educate professionals for shipbuilding, and the main building was finished in October 1807. The Admiralty suggested that the institute would start building small vessels for the Navy in order to teach shipbuilding skills to the students, and shipbuilding began on 12 August 1809.

== Okhta Admiralty shipyard ==
The first ship built by the Okhta yard was the schooner Strela (Arrow) was launched in 13. June 1811. In February 1812 the yard got an order to build 74 gunboats; the serfs, who had been previously released, were now seized again in the yard.

The panoptical institute was destroyed in fire in March 1818, but the shipbuilding premises did not suffer damages. Shipbuilding activity became independent thereafter. In 1822 was started construction of a garrison building for 600 marines on the institute ruins; subsequently, also shops were built, as well as warehouses, sawmill and number of other workshops. The Okhta area was joined to the city of Saint Petersburg in 1829 and in the same year planning of a new shipyard was assigned to V.F. Stoke; the Czar personally ordered, that the yard must have two large cradles for frigates and two smaller ones for brigs and other small vessels. The plans were approved in 1830. The yard operated under the Admiralty and it soon became one of the most important yards for newbuilding and repairing.

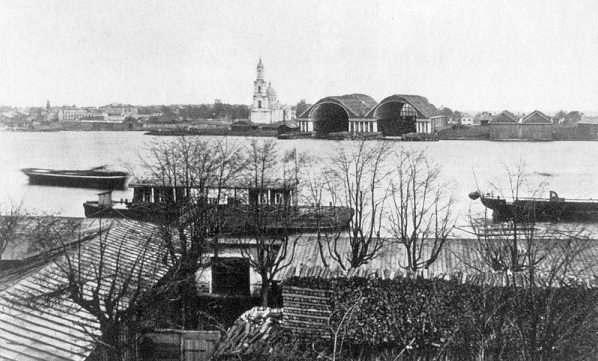
The Okhta shipyard sheds in the 1880s.

By the end of the 1840s the shipbuilding had moved indoors into large sheds designed by architect E.H. Annert supported by naval architect I.A. Amosov, who planned the foundation. The large and showy sheds remained until the early 20th century as a characteristic landmark of the Okhta area.

In 1856 the yard area was enlarged to the lands of previously deceased count E.F. Komarovski. However, soon after this steel started to replace wood as a material and the shipbuilding started to require more complex machinery, and the focus moved to the more modern New Admiralty Yard. Part of the yard area became training field for marines. Two of the cradles became timber stocks in 1861. The last vessels built at the Admiralty Okhta Yard were patrol boat Askold and clipper Jahont. During the following 30 years only the workshops and sawmill were used; they supplied material to the Saint Petersburg harbour workshops. An exception were 20 torpedo boats built in 1878.

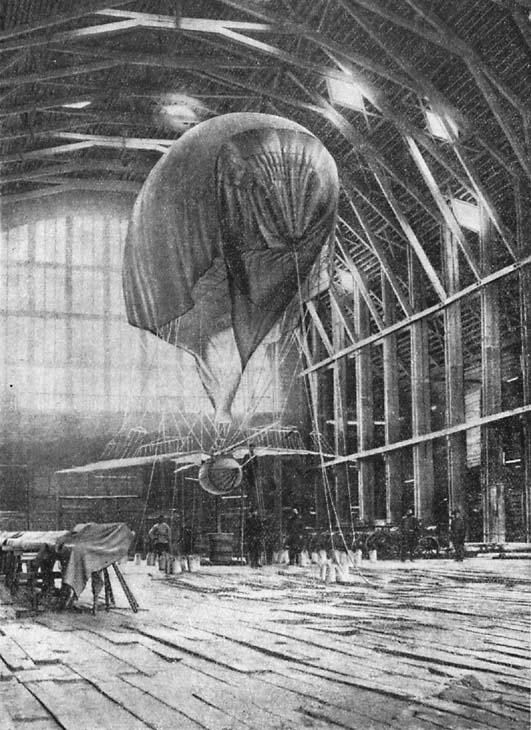
The Okhta shipyard sheds were used for aviation experiments in the 1890s.

During the years 1811–1864 the Okhta yard built 9 ships of the line, 28 frigates, 11 patrol boats, 17 brigs and 104 vessels of other types. The most significant ones were sloops-of-war Kamchatka and Predpriyatiye and frigates Pallada and Avrora. The Okhta yard was the most important yard of the Imperial Russian Navy during the years 1811–1864.

In the early 1890s the Admiralty leased the buildings for early aviation experiment purposes; the premises were used for building of hot air balloons for scientific research and under state assignment.

== Under ownership of W:m Crichton & C:o ==
In 1895 the Finnish shipbuilder and engineering company, Turku located W:m Crichton & C:o started negotiations with Admiralty about torpedo boat building. The initial plan was to build the hulls and other parts in Turku and transfer them to Saint Petersburg for final assembly. The Okhta shipyard was rented to Crichton for this purpose. The contract with validity of 35 years signed on 19 July 1896 included responsibility to invest on the premises and equip them with modern machinery. After expiry of the rental agreement, W:m Crichton & C:o was to give the real property to the state without compensation. The plan was to build ships up to 2 000 tonnes and steam engines with output up to 7 000 horsepower. The annual order intake was expected to be 3–4 million rubles. The shipbuilding was scheduled to start in early spring 1897.

The aviation researchers did not want to leave the premises which they had got to use after another contract signed earlier with the Admiralty. The responsible foreman V.S. Kretovich had support of counts Vladimir Alexandrovich and A.S. Apraksin. Shipbuilding was not started before Krevovich died in April 1897.

The company's motive for starting shipbuilding in Saint Petersburg were getting closer to the key customer and avoiding of tolls the Empire had imposed on the Grand Duchy of Finland. One reason why Crichton selected the Okhta yard was probably low cost; Saint Petersburg was a fast-growing metropolis in which good locations were expensive. By that time the Okhta had turned into shadowy, notorious quarter.

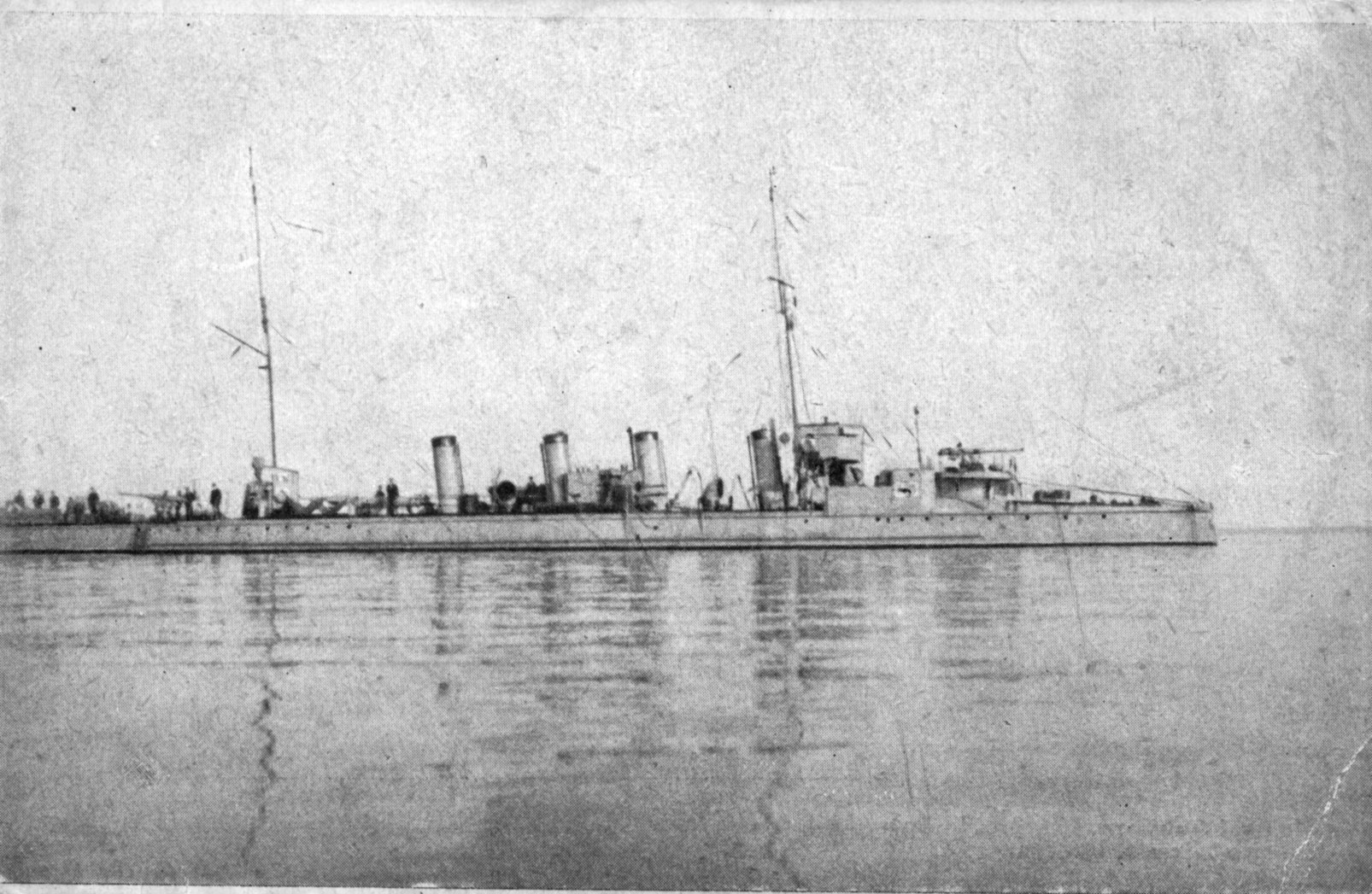
Poslushnyi was Crichton's first torpedo boat built at the Okhta yard.

The yard was in poor condition and the machinery was deficient; there were no premises for advanced production. Crichton was only allowed to use local workforce apart from some ten Finns, who worked as supervisors for the 400–500 yard workers. In 1898 two shipbuilding cradles were renovated and new foundry and power plants, as well as carpenter and model workshops were built. In the same year commercial counsellor Martinsson, the representative of W:m Crichton & C:o, signed a contract with Admiralty for four Sokol-type torpedo boats. This was followed by other orders of similar vessels. The yard produced also number of other vessel types and undertook repair projects. The ship drawings and large part of the machinery were made in Turku.

The shipyard suffered greatly from the indecisive ordering policy of the Admiralty. The yearly order intake fluctuated highly. Despite the large sum Crichton invested on machinery, the yard could not produce a single steam engine or boiler; they were shipped from Turku or sourced locally. In 1907 the yard starting producing Bertheau combustion engines; later Loke engines, but only a few units of each. Also capstans were produced.

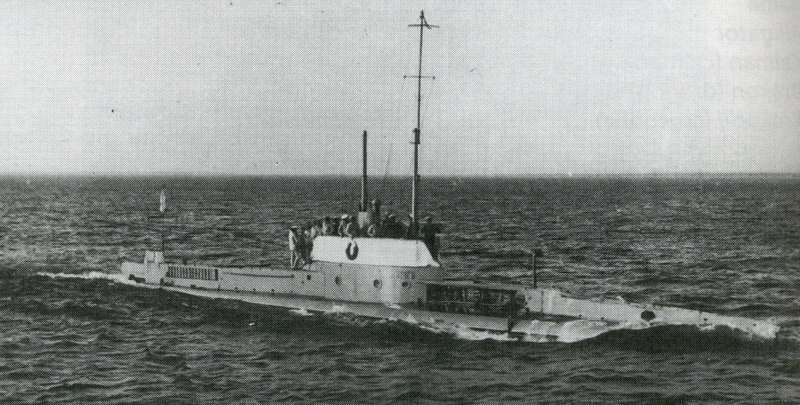
Russian submarine Alligator was one of the four Kaiman-class submarines, which caused to Crichton massive losses.

In 1906 the manager of Crichton John Eager retired and his place was taken by Karl Björksten. He soon realised that the Okhta yard had been unattended; for the past ten years the yard had been operated with poor management and raw materials had been used wastefully. In the following year Björksten demanded that the technical management must be changed; this did not happen before February 1908. Until 1906 the poor profitability was caused mainly by penalties the yard had to pay for delays, but also because of investments. Certain assignments agreed in the previous years started to cause serious problems in 1908: four submarine hulls ordered in 1905 for 1 388 400 marks including narrow profit margin, and had been under construction for over two years, caused now loss of 570 000 marks. Four 55-feet mine cutters ordered in 1905 for 240 300 marks showed loss of 241 971 marks, which was over the sales price. The total loss of Okhta yard in 1908 reached 1 092 595 marks.

At the beginning of 1909 Björksten was still hopeful; the yard had got orders for two large minelayers and two Moguchi type icebreakers. But also these projects turned unprofitable; the minelayers caused loss of 478 813 marks and the icebreakers 624 585 marks; in the meantime the interest payments climbed up to 143 214 ruble (382 380 marks). The 1909 balance sheet of Okhta yard showed loss of 1 025 412 marks. In the following year the loss was reduced to 482 912 marks, because some torpedo boat repair projects had turned profitable. At this stage the headcount was 1 166. It was reduced down to 871 in 1911 and the losses dropped to 290 364 marks.

During years 1906–1912 the Okhta yard had bled the parent Crichton white; the situation was further worsened when the Turku yard started to create loss. As a solution, some Russian owners of W:m Crichton & C:o suggested closing the Turku yard and focusing the production entirely in Okhta but the plan was rejected. The Russian authorities suspected that W:m Crichton & C:o built some of the ordered vessels in Finland and transferring the profit to its Finnish branch. In the subsequent audit it came out that the Okhta yard did not fulfill the terms of the contract; the company had not made the agreed investments on the premises.

The financial statements of the last operating year have not been preserved. In April 1913 W:m Crichton & C:o was filed for bankruptcy and the 400 people then working in Okhta became unemployed. The yard area was taken over by the Treasury.

The surviving documents consist total 94 vessels built at Okhta yard during Crichton's era.

== Later history ==
The yard was named Petrozavod in 1913. Since the beginning of 1915 the Admiralty yard used the premises for artillery ammunition production. The old and decayed cradles and large sheds were torn down in the same August. Following the October Revolution in 1917, the yard built non-self-propelled vessels. Hawser production began in 1931 and later in the same decade the yard started building naval trawlers for the Soviet Navy. During the Great Patriotic War in 1941–1945 the yard produced shells and modified trawlers for military purposes; additionally, 118 cutters and 14 barges were built for the Road of Life. Towing hawser production ended in 1973 and the plant was subsequently renewed; the production focused now on shipbuilding machinery. The factory became a part of RITM Scientific Production Association. In 1994 it was privatised and became an open joint-stock company, which went bankrupt in 2001.

== Known vessels built in 1898–1913 ==
Year of order	Project number	Name	Type	Shipowner
1898	1 444		screw-propelled steamer	(Russian Empire) Russian Customs
1898	1 450	Posylnyi	screw-propelled steamer	(Russian Empire) Russian Customs
1899	1 451	Kur'er	screw-propelled steamer	(Russian Empire) (Russian customer)
1899	1 454		screw-propelled steamer	(Russian Empire) (Russian customer)
1902	1 455	Poslushnyi	torpedo boat, Sokol class	Imperial Russian Navy
1902	1 456	Podvizhnyi	torpedo boat, Sokol class	Imperial Russian Navy
1902	1 469	Smetlivyi	torpedo boat, Sokol class	Imperial Russian Navy
1902	1 470	Strogyi	torpedo boat, Sokol class	Imperial Russian Navy
1902	1 471	Stremitelnyi	torpedo boat, Sokol class	Imperial Russian Navy
1902	1 472	Svirepyi	torpedo boat, Sokol class	Imperial Russian Navy
1903	1 522	№ 221	torpedo boat, Cyklon class	Imperial Russian Navy
1903	1 523	№ 222	torpedo boat, Cyklon class	Imperial Russian Navy
1903	1 524	№ 223	torpedo boat, Cyklon class	Imperial Russian Navy
1901	1 525	Reniy	tugboat	(Russian Empire) (Russian customer)
1902	1 557		barge	(Russian Empire) (Russian customer)
1902	1 596	Kroko Baykal	screw-propelled steamer	(Russian Empire) (Russian customer)
1903	1 644	Solonbala	screw-propelled steamer	(Russian Empire) (Russian customer)
1904	1 657	№ 212	torpedo boat, Cyklon class	Imperial Russian Navy
1904	1 658	№ 213	torpedo boat, Cyklon class	Imperial Russian Navy
1904	1 659	№ 214	torpedo boat, Cyklon class	Imperial Russian Navy
1905	1 660	Porochovoy	steam cutter	(Russian Empire) (Russian customer)
1905	1 715	Inz. M. Anastasov	torpedo destroyer, Sokol class	Imperial Russian Navy
1905	1 716	Leytn. Maleyev	torpedo destroyer, Sokol class	Imperial Russian Navy
1905	1 731	Drakon	submarine hull, Kaiman class	(United States) Lake & Co.
1905	1 732	Kaiman	submarine hull, Kaiman class	(United States) Lake & Co.
1905	1 733	Krokodil	submarine hull, Kaiman class	(United States) Lake & Co.
1905	1 734	Alligator	submarine hull, Kaiman class	(United States) Lake & Co.
1905	1 736		motor cutter	Imperial Russian Navy
1905	1 737		motor cutter	Imperial Russian Navy
1905	1 738		motor cutter	Imperial Russian Navy
1905	1 739		motor cutter	Imperial Russian Navy
1907	1 768	Kusnetchicha	tugboat	(Russian Empire) Port of Arkhangelsk
1907	1 774		mine cutter	Imperial Russian Navy
1907	1 775		mine cutter	Imperial Russian Navy
1907	1 776		mine cutter	Imperial Russian Navy
1907	1 777		mine cutter	Imperial Russian Navy
1908	1 783	Tochnyi	minelayer	(Russian Empire) Russian Electricity Administration
1908	1 784	Trevoznyi	minelayer	(Russian Empire) Russian Electricity Administration
1908	1 785		mine cutter	Imperial Russian Navy
1908	1 786		mine cutter	Imperial Russian Navy
1908	1 787		mine cutter	Imperial Russian Navy
1908	1 788		mine cutter	Imperial Russian Navy
1908	1 789		mine cutter	Imperial Russian Navy
1908	1 790		mine cutter	Imperial Russian Navy
1908	1 791		mine cutter	Imperial Russian Navy
1908	1 792		mine cutter	Imperial Russian Navy
1908	1 793		mine cutter	Imperial Russian Navy
1908	1 794		mine cutter	Imperial Russian Navy
1908	1 795		mine cutter	Imperial Russian Navy
1908	1 796		mine cutter	Imperial Russian Navy
1908	1 801	Herkules	icebreaker	Russian Hydrographic Office
1910	1 802	Silatch	icebreaker	Russian Hydrographic Office
1908	1 806		mine cutter	Imperial Russian Navy
1908	1 807		mine cutter	Baltic Shipyard
1908	1 808		mine cutter	Baltic Shipyard
1909	1 817	Tverdyi	mine transportation vessel	(Russian Empire) Russian Electricity Administration
1909	1 829		lightvessel	(Russian Empire) Russian Hydrographic Office
1909	1 830		lightvessel	(Russian Empire) Russian Hydrographic Office
1909	1 831	Vodolen	water transportation vessel	(Russian Empire) Russian Admiralty
1909	1 832		motorboat hull	(Russian Empire) Okhta Shipyard
1909	1 833	Vyetskaya I	sand dredger	(Russian Empire) Russian Transportation Ministry
1910	1 837		mine motor cutter	(Russian Empire) Russian Electricity Administration
1910	1 838		mine motor cutter	(Russian Empire) Russian Electricity Administration
1910	1 839		mine motor cutter	(Russian Empire) Russian Electricity Administration
1910	1 840		mine motor cutter	(Russian Empire) Russian Electricity Administration
1910	1 841		mine motor cutter	(Russian Empire) Russian Electricity Administration
1910	1 842		mine motor cutter	(Russian Empire) Russian Electricity Administration
1910	1 843		mine motor cutter	(Russian Empire) Russian Electricity Administration
1910	1 844		mine motor cutter	(Russian Empire) Russian Electricity Administration
1910	1 845		mine motor cutter	(Russian Empire) Russian Electricity Administration
1910	1 846		mine motor cutter	(Russian Empire) Russian Electricity Administration
1910	1 847	Admiral Zaviko	patrol boat	(Russian Empire) Olonets Governorate
1910	1 864	Konvoir	convoy ship	(Russian Empire) Russian Admiralty
1910	1 865	Sputnik	convoy ship	(Russian Empire) Russian Admiralty
1911	1 876		mine motor cutter	(Russian Empire) Russian Electricity Administration
1911	1 877		mine motor cutter	(Russian Empire) Russian Electricity Administration
1911	1 878		mine motor cutter	(Russian Empire) Russian Electricity Administration
1911	1 879		mine motor cutter	(Russian Empire) Russian Electricity Administration
1911	1 880		mine motor cutter	(Russian Empire) Russian Electricity Administration
1911	1 883		barge	(Russian Empire) Russian Border Guard
1911	1 907		tugboat	(Russian Empire) P. Byelyayeff, Saint Petersburg
1911	1 908		paddle steamer hull	(Russian Empire) Onega Steam Shipping Company
1911	1 910		mine motor cutter	(Russian Empire) Russian Electricity Administration
1911	1 911		mine motor cutter	(Russian Empire) Russian Electricity Administration
1911	1 912		mine motor cutter	(Russian Empire) Russian Electricity Administration
1911	1 913		mine motor cutter	(Russian Empire) Russian Electricity Administration
1911	1 914		mine motor cutter	(Russian Empire) Russian Electricity Administration
1911	1 926		cruiser	(Russian Empire) Russian Border Administration
1911	1 927		cruiser	(Russian Empire) Russian Border Administration
1911	1 928		cruiser	(Russian Empire) Russian Border Administration
1911	1 940		mine motor cutter	(Russian Empire) Russian Electricity Administration
1911	1 941		mine motor cutter	(Russian Empire) Russian Electricity Administration
1911	1 942		mine motor cutter	(Russian Empire) Russian Electricity Administration
1911	1 943		mine motor cutter	(Russian Empire) Russian Electricity Administration

== See also ==
- Crichton-Vulcan

== Bibliography ==
- Breyer, Siegfried (1992). Soviet Warship Development: Volume 1: 1917–1937. London: Conway Maritime Press. ISBN 0-85177-604-3.
- Grönros, Jarmo; Kujanen, Hannu; Priamursky, G.; Rinta-Tassi, Osmo; Saarinen, Jarmo; Teräs, Kari; Trofimov, S. (1996). Aurajoen rautakourat — Järnnävarna vid Aura Å (in Finnish and Swedish). Turku, Finland: Turun maakuntamuseo — Åbo landskapsmuseum. ISBN 951-595-020-1.
- von Knorring, Nils (1995). Aurajoen veistämöt ja telakat [Boat- and Shipyards along River Aura] (in Finnish). Espoo, Finland: Schildts Förlags Ab. ISBN 951-50-0735-6.
